= List of Digitaria species =

The following species in the grass genus Digitaria, the finger-grasses, are accepted by Plants of the World Online. The genus contains the weedy crabgrasses and the orphan crops white fonio and black fonio.

== List ==
- Digitaria abludens (Roem. & Schult.) Veldkamp
- Digitaria abyssinica (Hochst. ex A.Rich.) Stapf
- Digitaria acuminatissima Stapf
- Digitaria adamaouensis Zon
- Digitaria aequiglumis (Hack. & Arechav.) Parodi
- Digitaria albescens (C.E.Hubb.) Lo Medico & A.S.Vega
- Digitaria alleizettei A.Camus
- Digitaria ammophila (Benth.) Hughes
- Digitaria andicola Gir.-Cañas
- Digitaria andringitrensis A.Camus
- Digitaria angolensis Rendle
- Digitaria ankaratrensis A.Camus
- Digitaria appropinquata Goetgh.
- Digitaria arenicola (Swallen) Beetle
- Digitaria argillacea (Hitchc. & Chase) Fernald
- Digitaria argyrograpta (Nees) Stapf
- Digitaria argyrotricha (Andersson) Chiov.
- Digitaria aridicola Napper
- Digitaria aristulata (Steud.) Stapf
- Digitaria arushae Clayton
- Digitaria asthenes Clayton
- Digitaria atra Luces
- Digitaria atrofusca (Hack.) A.Camus
- Digitaria badia (Scribn. & Merr.) Fernald
- Digitaria baileyi (Benth.) Hughes
- Digitaria bakeri (Nash) Fernald
- Digitaria balansae Henrard
- Digitaria barbinodis Henrard
- Digitaria basaltica B.K.Simon
- Digitaria bicornis (Lam.) Roem. & Schult.
- Digitaria bidactyla Van der Veken
- Digitaria bonplandii Henrard
- Digitaria bosseri Voronts.
- Digitaria brazzae (Franch.) Stapf
- Digitaria breedlovei R.W.Pohl & Davidse
- Digitaria breviglumis (Domin) Henrard
- Digitaria brownii (Roem. & Schult.) Hughes
- Digitaria brunoana Raimondo
- Digitaria calcarata Clayton
- Digitaria caledonica Henrard
- Digitaria californica (Benth.) Henrard
- Digitaria cardenasiana Gir.-Cañas
- Digitaria catamarcensis Rúgolo
- Digitaria cayoensis Swallen
- Digitaria chacoensis (Parodi) Henrard
- Digitaria chaseae Henrard
- Digitaria ciliaris (Retz.) Koeler
- Digitaria clarkiae Sánchez-Ken
- Digitaria clavitricha R.W.Pohl
- Digitaria coenicola (F.Muell.) Hughes
- Digitaria cognata (Schult.) Pilg.
- Digitaria comifera Pilg.
- Digitaria compacta (Roth) Veldkamp
- Digitaria complanata Goetgh.
- Digitaria compressa Stapf
- Digitaria connivens (Trin.) Henrard
- Digitaria corynotricha (Hack.) Henrard
- Digitaria costaricensis R.W.Pohl
- Digitaria cowiei B.K.Simon
- Digitaria cruciata (Nees ex Steud.) E.G.Camus & A.Camus
- Digitaria ctenantha (F.Muell.) Hughes
- Digitaria curtigluma Hitchc.
- Digitaria curvinervis (Hack.) Fernald
- Digitaria cuyabensis (Trin.) Parodi
- Digitaria debilis (Desf.) Willd.
- Digitaria delicata Goetgh.
- Digitaria delicatula Stapf
- Digitaria diagonalis (Nees) Stapf
- Digitaria didactyla Willd.
- Digitaria diffusa Vickery
- Digitaria dioica Killeen & Rúgolo
- Digitaria distans (Chase ex Hitchc.) Fernald
- Digitaria divaricatissima (R.Br.) Hughes
- Digitaria diversinervis (Nees) Stapf
- Digitaria doellii Mez
- Digitaria dolleryi B.K.Simon
- Digitaria dunensis Goetgh.
- Digitaria duthieana Henrard ex Bor
- Digitaria eggersii (Hack.) Henrard
- Digitaria ekmanii Hitchc.
- Digitaria eminens (Steud.) Backer
- Digitaria enodis (Hack. ex Arechav.) Parodi
- Digitaria eriantha Steud.
- Digitaria eriostachya Mez
- Digitaria evrardii Van der Veken
- Digitaria exilis (Kippist) Stapf
- Digitaria eylesii C.E.Hubb.
- Digitaria fauriei Ohwi
- Digitaria fiebrigii (Hack.) A.Camus
- Digitaria filiformis (L.) Koeler
- Digitaria flaccida Stapf
- Digitaria floridana Hitchc.
- Digitaria fragilis (Steud.) Luces
- Digitaria fujianensis (L.Liu) S.M.Phillips & S.L.Chen
- Digitaria fulva Bosser
- Digitaria fuscescens (J.Presl) Henrard
- Digitaria fuscopilosa Goetgh.
- Digitaria gardneri Henrard
- Digitaria gaudichaudii (Kunth) Henrard
- Digitaria gayana (Kunth) A.Chev.
- Digitaria gazensis Rendle
- Digitaria gentilis Henrard
- Digitaria gerdesii (Hack.) Parodi
- Digitaria gibbosa (R.Br.) P.Beauv.
- Digitaria glauca A.Camus
- Digitaria gracillima (Scribn.) Fernald
- Digitaria griffithii (Hook.f.) Henrard
- Digitaria gymnostachys Pilg.
- Digitaria gymnotheca Clayton
- Digitaria hengduanensis L.Liu
- Digitaria henrardii Veldkamp
- Digitaria heterantha (Hook.f.) Merr.
- Digitaria hitchcockii (Chase) Hauman & Van der Veken
- Digitaria hololeuca Henrard
- Digitaria horizontalis Willd.
- Digitaria hubbardii Henrard
- Digitaria humbertii A.Camus
- Digitaria hyalina Robyns & Van der Veken
- Digitaria hydrophila Van der Veken
- Digitaria hystrichoides Vickery
- Digitaria iburua Stapf
- Digitaria imbricata R.D.Webster
- Digitaria incisa Van der Veken
- Digitaria induta Swallen
- Digitaria insularis (L.) Mez ex Ekman
- Digitaria intecta Stapf
- Digitaria isanensis Boonsuk, Chantar. & Hodk.
- Digitaria ischaemum (Schreb.) Muhl.
- Digitaria jansenii Veldkamp
- Digitaria jubata (Griseb.) Henrard
- Digitaria junghuhniana (Nees ex Steud.) Henrard
- Digitaria killeenii Vega & Rúgolo
- Digitaria lanceolata R.D.Webster
- Digitaria lanuginosa (Nees) Henrard
- Digitaria larsenii Bor
- Digitaria laxa (Rchb.) Parodi
- Digitaria lehmanniana Henrard
- Digitaria leiantha (Hack.) Parodi
- Digitaria leptalea Ohwi
- Digitaria leptorhachis (Pilg.) Stapf
- Digitaria leucites (Trin.) Henrard
- Digitaria leucostachya (Domin) Henrard
- Digitaria longiflora (Retz.) Pers.
- Digitaria macroblephara (Hack. ex Schinz) Paoli
- Digitaria madagascariensis Bosser
- Digitaria maitlandii Stapf & C.E.Hubb.
- Digitaria maniculata Stapf
- Digitaria manongarivensis A.Camus
- Digitaria mariannensis Merr.
- Digitaria mauritiana Henrard
- Digitaria megasthenes Goetgh.
- Digitaria melanotricha Clayton
- Digitaria mezii Kaneh.
- Digitaria michoacanensis Sánchez-Ken
- Digitaria milanjiana (Rendle) Stapf
- Digitaria minima R.D.Webster
- Digitaria minoriflora Goetgh.
- Digitaria mollicoma (Kunth) Henrard
- Digitaria monobotrys (Van der Veken) Clayton
- Digitaria monodactyla (Nees) Stapf
- Digitaria monodii Veldkamp
- Digitaria monopholis Clayton
- Digitaria montana Henrard
- Digitaria multiflora Swallen
- Digitaria myriostachya (Hack.) Henrard
- Digitaria myurus Stapf
- Digitaria natalensis Stent
- Digitaria neesiana Henrard
- Digitaria neghellensis J.-P.Lebrun
- Digitaria nematostachya (F.M.Bailey) Henrard
- Digitaria nodosa Parl.
- Digitaria nuda Schumach.
- Digitaria oraria R.D.Webster
- Digitaria orbata Hughes
- Digitaria pampinosa Henrard
- Digitaria panicea (Sw.) Urb.
- Digitaria paniculata Soderstr. ex McVaugh
- Digitaria papposa (R.Br.) P.Beauv.
- Digitaria paraguayensis Henrard
- Digitaria parodii Jacq.-Fél.
- Digitaria parva Swallen
- Digitaria parviflora (R.Br.) Hughes
- Digitaria patagiata Henrard
- Digitaria patens (Swallen) Henrard
- Digitaria pauciflora Hitchc.
- Digitaria pearsonii Stapf
- Digitaria pellita Stapf
- Digitaria pennata (Hochst.) T.Cooke
- Digitaria perpusilla Pilg.
- Digitaria perrieri A.Camus
- Digitaria perrottetii (Kunth) Stapf
- Digitaria petelotii Henrard
- Digitaria phaeothrix (Trin.) Parodi
- Digitaria phaeotricha (Chiov.) Robyns
- Digitaria philippinensis Henrard
- Digitaria pinetorum Hitchc.
- Digitaria pittieri (Hack.) Henrard
- Digitaria planiculmis Henrard
- Digitaria platycarpha (Trin.) Stapf
- Digitaria poggeana Mez
- Digitaria polybotryoides Robyns & Van der Veken
- Digitaria polyphylla Henrard
- Digitaria porrecta S.T.Blake
- Digitaria procurrens Goetgh.
- Digitaria psammophila Henrard
- Digitaria pseudodiagonalis Chiov.
- Digitaria pubiflora (Vasey) Wipff
- Digitaria pulchra Van der Veken
- Digitaria purpurea Swallen
- Digitaria pusilla Ridl.
- Digitaria radicosa (J.Presl) Miq.
- Digitaria ramularis (Trin.) Henrard
- Digitaria rangelii Gir.-Cañas
- Digitaria redheadii (C.E.Hubb.) Clayton
- Digitaria remotigluma (De Winter) Clayton
- Digitaria rivae (Chiov.) Stapf
- Digitaria rukwae Clayton
- Digitaria sabulicola Henrard
- Digitaria sacchariflora (Raddi) Henrard
- Digitaria sacculata Clayton
- Digitaria sanguinalis (L.) Scop.
- Digitaria schmitzii Van der Veken
- Digitaria sejuncta (Hack. ex Pilg.) Henrard
- Digitaria sellowii (C.Muell.) Henrard
- Digitaria seriata Stapf
- Digitaria serotina (Walter) Michx.
- Digitaria setifolia Stapf
- Digitaria setigera Roth
- Digitaria sharpeana B.K.Simon
- Digitaria siderograpta Chiov.
- Digitaria simpsonii (Vasey) Fernald
- Digitaria singularis Mez
- Digitaria sparsifructus Ohwi
- Digitaria stenostachya Hughes
- Digitaria stenotaphrodes (Nees ex Steud.) Stapf
- Digitaria stewartiana Bor
- Digitaria stricta Roth
- Digitaria subcalva Hitchc.
- Digitaria subsulcata Robyns & Van der Veken
- Digitaria swalleniana Henrard
- Digitaria tararensis Henrard
- Digitaria tenuifolia Goetgh.
- Digitaria tenuis (Nees) Henrard
- Digitaria ternata (A.Rich.) Stapf
- Digitaria texana Hitchc.
- Digitaria thailandica Boonsuk, Chantar. & Hodk.
- Digitaria thouarsiana (Flüggé) A.Camus
- Digitaria thwaitesii (Hack.) Henrard
- Digitaria thyrsoidea Balansa
- Digitaria tisserantii Jacq.-Fél.
- Digitaria tomentosa (J.Koenig ex Rottler) Henrard
- Digitaria tricholaenoides Stapf
- Digitaria trinervis Van der Veken
- Digitaria ursulae H.Scholz
- Digitaria veldkampiana B.K.Simon
- Digitaria velutina (Forssk.) P.Beauv.
- Digitaria venezuelae Henrard
- Digitaria ventriosa Van der Veken
- Digitaria villiculmis Henrard
- Digitaria villosa (Walter) Pers.
- Digitaria violascens Link
- Digitaria wallichiana (Wight & Arn. ex Steud.) Stapf
- Digitaria xanthotricha (Hack.) Stapf
