= Tropical crabgrass =

Tropical crabgrass crab. Digitaria and may refer to:

- Digitaria argillacea
- Digitaria bicornis
- Digitaria ciliaris
