= Fonio =

Species of cultivated grass

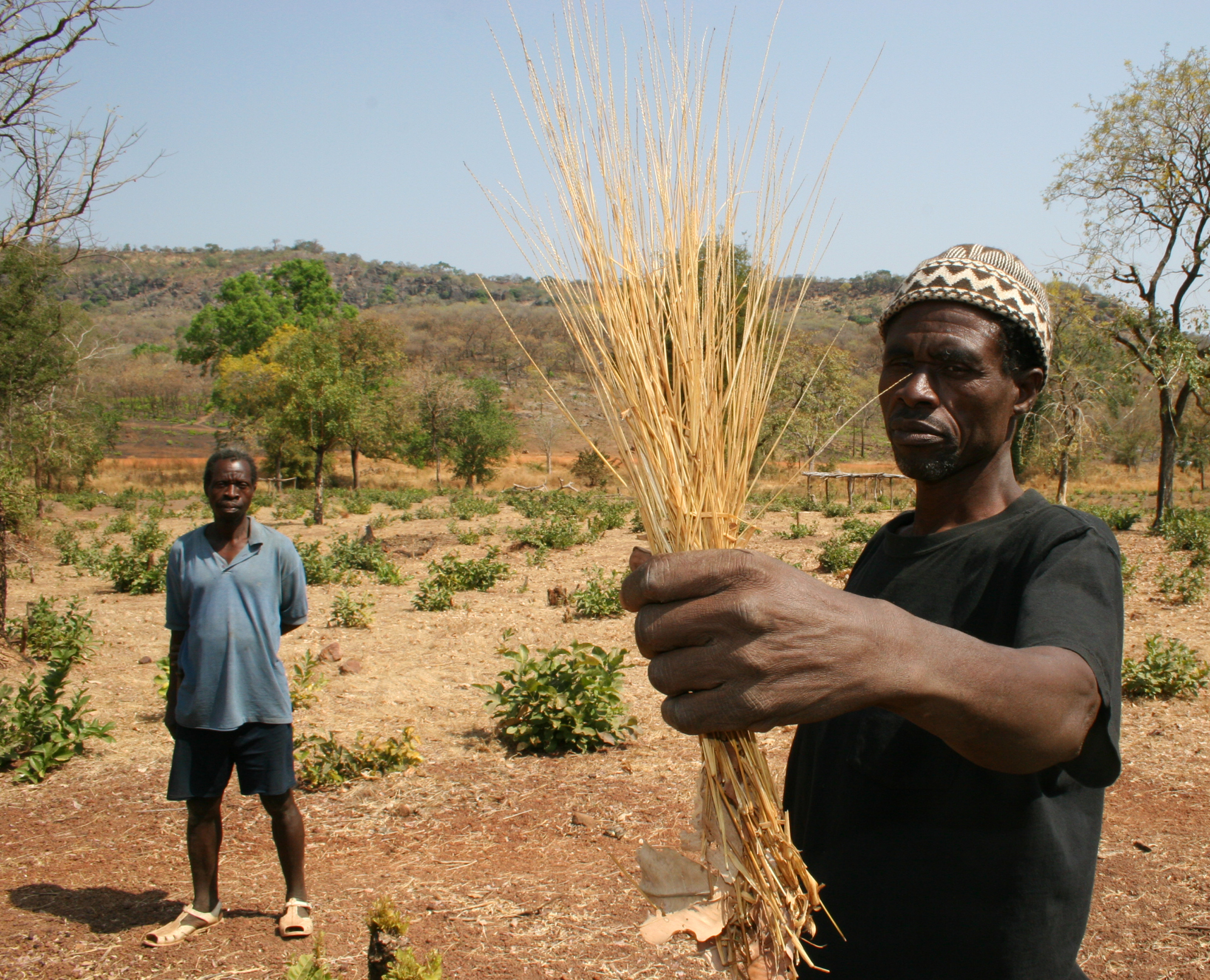
White fonio in Tambacounda Region of southern Senegal

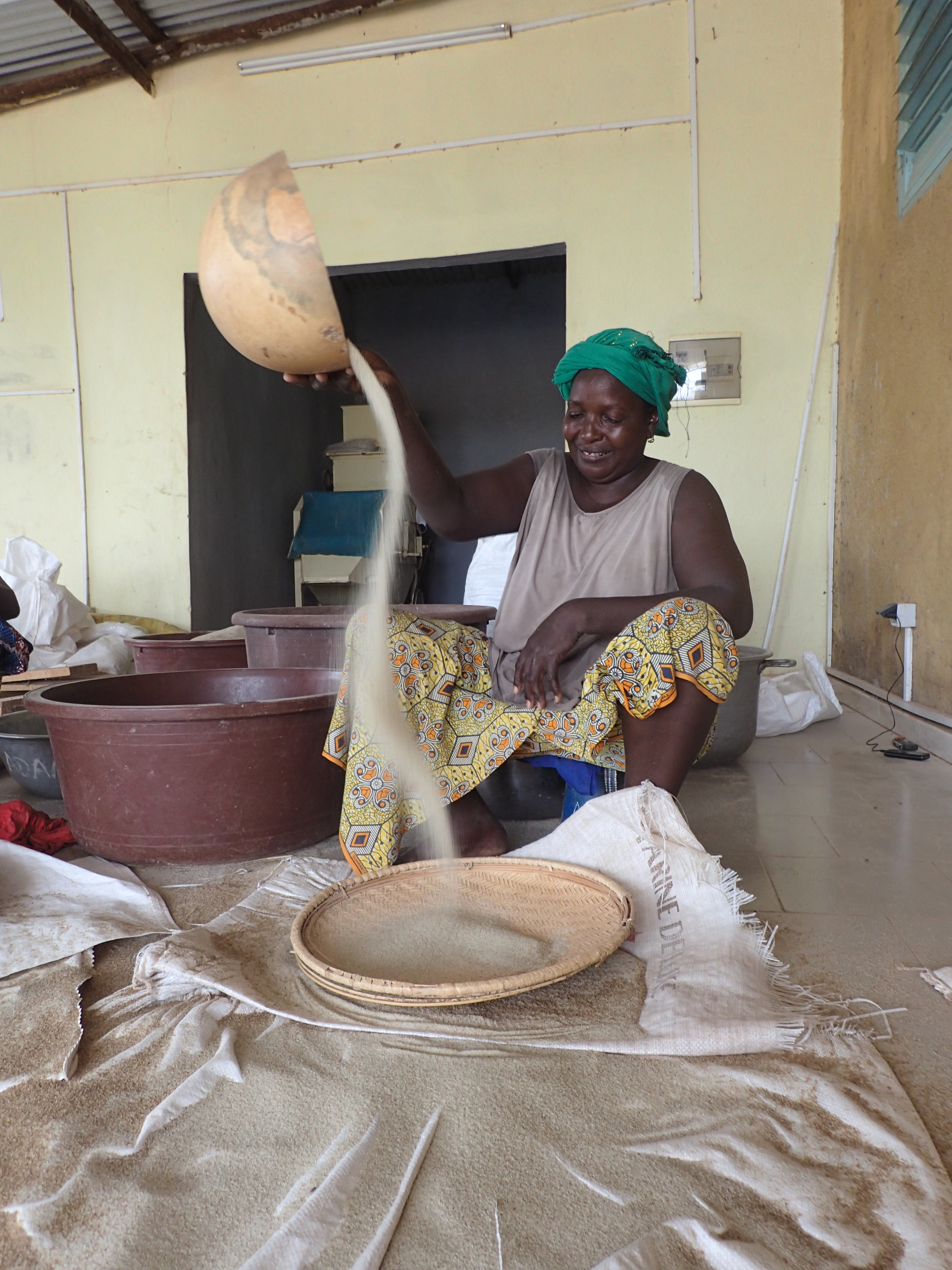
Winnowing fonio in Kédougou, Senegal

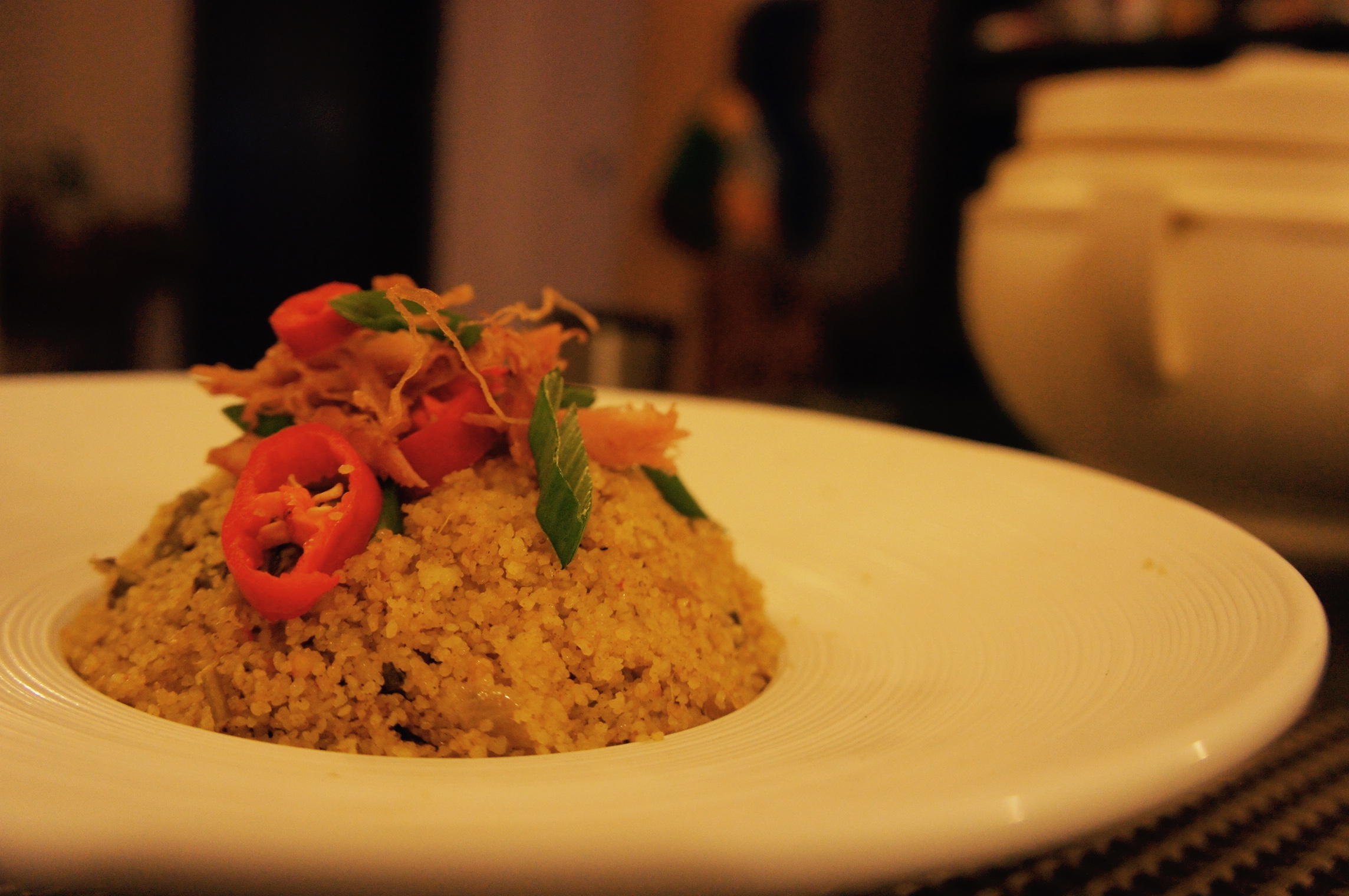
Acha (fonio)

Fonio, also sometimes called findi or acha, is the term for two cultivated grasses in the genus Digitaria that are important crops in parts of West Africa. It is a vital food source in many rural areas, especially in the mountains of Fouta Djalon, Guinea, but it is also cultivated in Mali, Burkina Faso, Ivory Coast, Nigeria, and Senegal. The global fonio market was estimated at 721,400 tonnes in 2020. Guinea annually produces the most fonio in the world, accounting for over 75% of the world's production in 2019. The name fonio (borrowed into English from French) is from Wolof foño. In West Africa, the species black fonio (Digitaria iburua) and white fonio (Digitaria exilis) are cultivated; the latter is the economically more important crop.

Fonio is a glumaceous monocot belonging to the grass family Poaceae and the genus Digitaria. While hundreds of these crabgrass species exist, only a few of them are produced for their grains. It is a small annual herbaceous plant with an inflorescence containing two or three racemes. The racemes have spikelets grouped in twos, threes, or fours, with a sterile and a fertile flower producing the fonio grain. Fonio has a short growing season and is well adjusted to harsh environments. The size of its root system, which can extend down to more than one meter in depth, is advantageous in periods of drought and helps with its adaptation to poor soils. Once considered a humble and often overlooked grain commonly known as the "cereal of the poor," fonio is now gaining attention in urban West Africa. Its unique cooking properties and nutritional benefits are sparking renewed interest in this once underrated staple.

== Types ==
=== White fonio ===
White fonio, Digitaria exilis, also called "hungry rice" by Europeans, is the most common of a diverse group of wild and domesticated Digitaria species that are harvested in the savannas of West Africa. Fonio has the smallest seeds of all species of millet. It has potential to improve nutrition, boost food security, foster rural development, and support sustainable use of the land.

Nutritious, gluten-free, and high in dietary fiber, fonio is one of the world's fastest-growing cereals, reaching maturity in as little as six to eight weeks. The grains are used to make porridge, couscous, bread, and beer.

=== Black fonio ===
Black fonio, D. iburua, also known as iburu, is a similar crop grown in several countries of West Africa, particularly Nigeria, Togo, and Benin. Like white fonio, it is nutritious, fast-growing, and has the benefit of maturing before other grains, allowing for harvest during the "hungry season." However, it contains considerably more protein compared to D. exilis.

Black fonio is mostly cultivated in rural communities and is rarely sold commercially, even in West African cities.

== Cultivation and processing ==
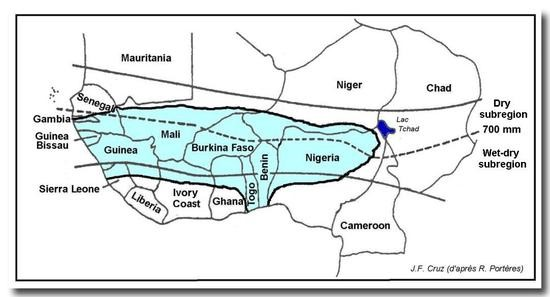
Climate zone Fonio cultivation area

=== Climate and attributes ===
Fonio is cultivated in all West Africa as a staple crop. Guinea is the biggest producer of fonio with a production of 483,906 tonnes (533,415 short tons) and a cultivated surface area of 590,129 hectares (1,458,240 acres) in 2021, followed by Nigeria (86,609 tonnes (95,470 short tons)) and Mali (47,664 tonnes (52,541 short tons)).

Fonio grows in dry climates without irrigation, and is unlikely to be a successful crop in humid regions. It is planted in light (sandy to stony) soils, and will grow in poor soil. Fonio is cultivated at sea level in Gambia, Sierra Leone and Guinea-Bissau, but it is otherwise mostly cultivated in altitudes ranging between 400 and 1,500 metres (1,300 and 4,900 ft). The growth cycle ranges from 70–130 days, depending on variety. It is mostly grown in areas with an average annual rainfall of 900–1,000 millimetres (35–39 in).

Fonio plants are medium in height. Indeed, D. exilis can reach a height of 80 centimetres (31 in), and D. iburua a height of 150 centimetres (59 in). The ploidy level for the species ranges from diploid (2n), tetraploid (4n), to hexaploid (6n). Like many other grasses, fonio has a C_{4} carbon fixation, which makes it drought tolerant.

=== Ploughing and sowing ===
The ploughing is done by the men by hand, animal traction or with tractors. The sowing is generally done by hand by the women, depending on the onset of the rainy season. The fonio plant grows quickly; some landraces reach maturity in 8 weeks. It is, however, a weak weed competitor at the beginning of its growth, so weeding is important in the first development stages.

=== Harvest ===
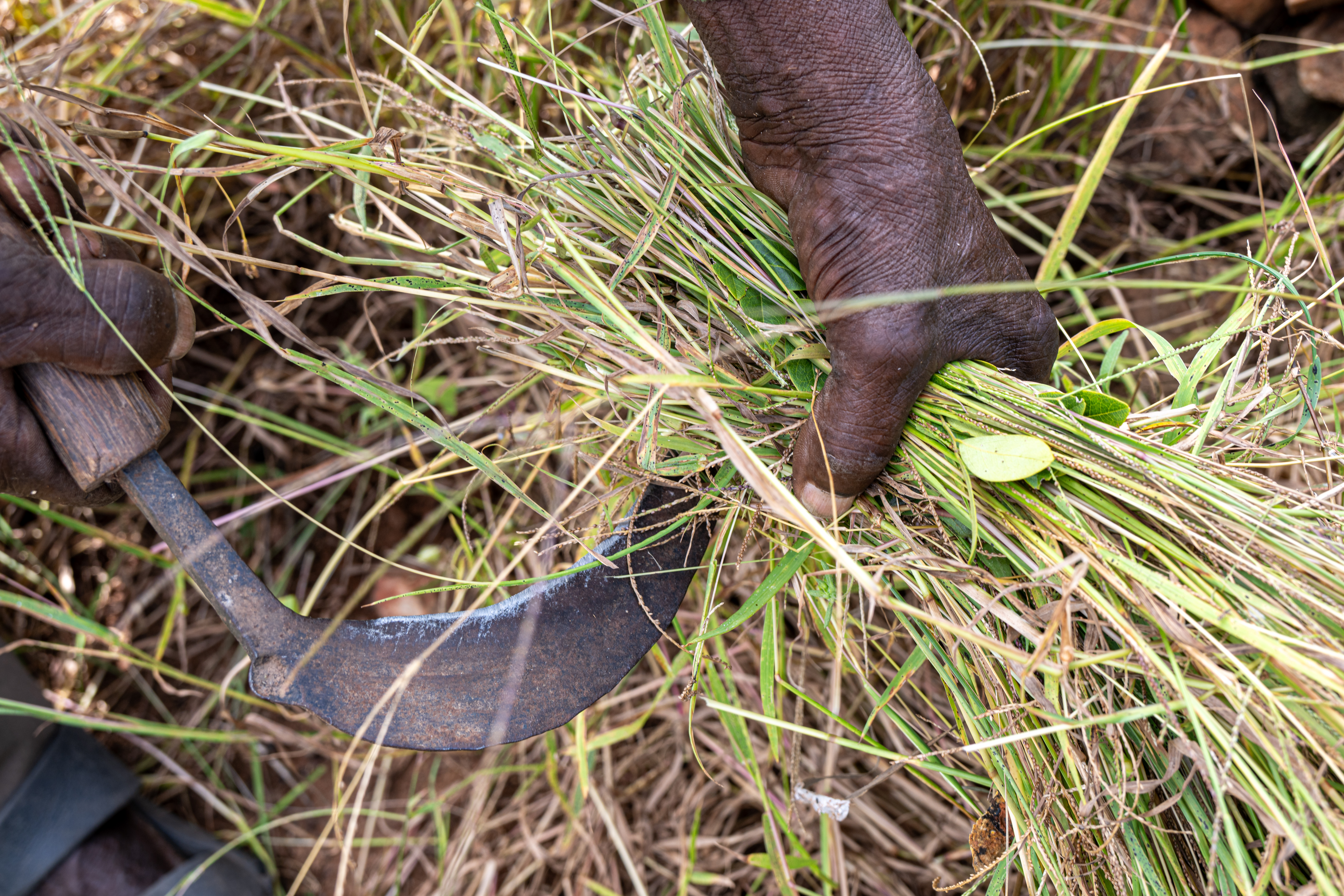
Traditional fonio harvest with a sickle, Natitingou, northern Benin

Fonio is labor-intensive to harvest and process. In some regions, the mature fonio plants are uprooted, but the most common method is to cut the straws with knives and sickles which often leads to wounds on the hands. Women then gather the sheaves into cylindrical stacks or horizontal beams to store the sheaves and allow them to dry before the threshing without overheating. The threshing is then done by trampling on the plants or by beating the plants with rigid rods or more flexible sticks

The fonio plants are prone to lodging in the soil, which makes potential mechanization of the harvest processes difficult.

=== Dehusking ===
After the threshing, the fonio grains are still in their husk and the small grains make husk removal difficult and time-consuming. Traditional methods include pounding it in a mortar with sand, and then separating the grains and sand, or "popping" it over a flame and then pounding it, which yields a toasted-color grain (a technique used among the Akposso). The invention of a simple fonio husking machine offers an easier mechanical way to dehusk.

=== Gender roles ===
Gender roles play a big part in the cultivation of fonio; tasks are distributed differently between men and women. Women do the weeding, the threshing by trampling, the cleaning as well as the drying and processing, while men do the harvest and the threshing by beating. Women's role is predominant in fonio's production. Half of the cultivation's tasks are exclusively done by women, against 14% for men. The tasks assigned to women require patience and meticulousness, while those assigned to men call for strength.

=== Effect of processing methods on nutrient value ===
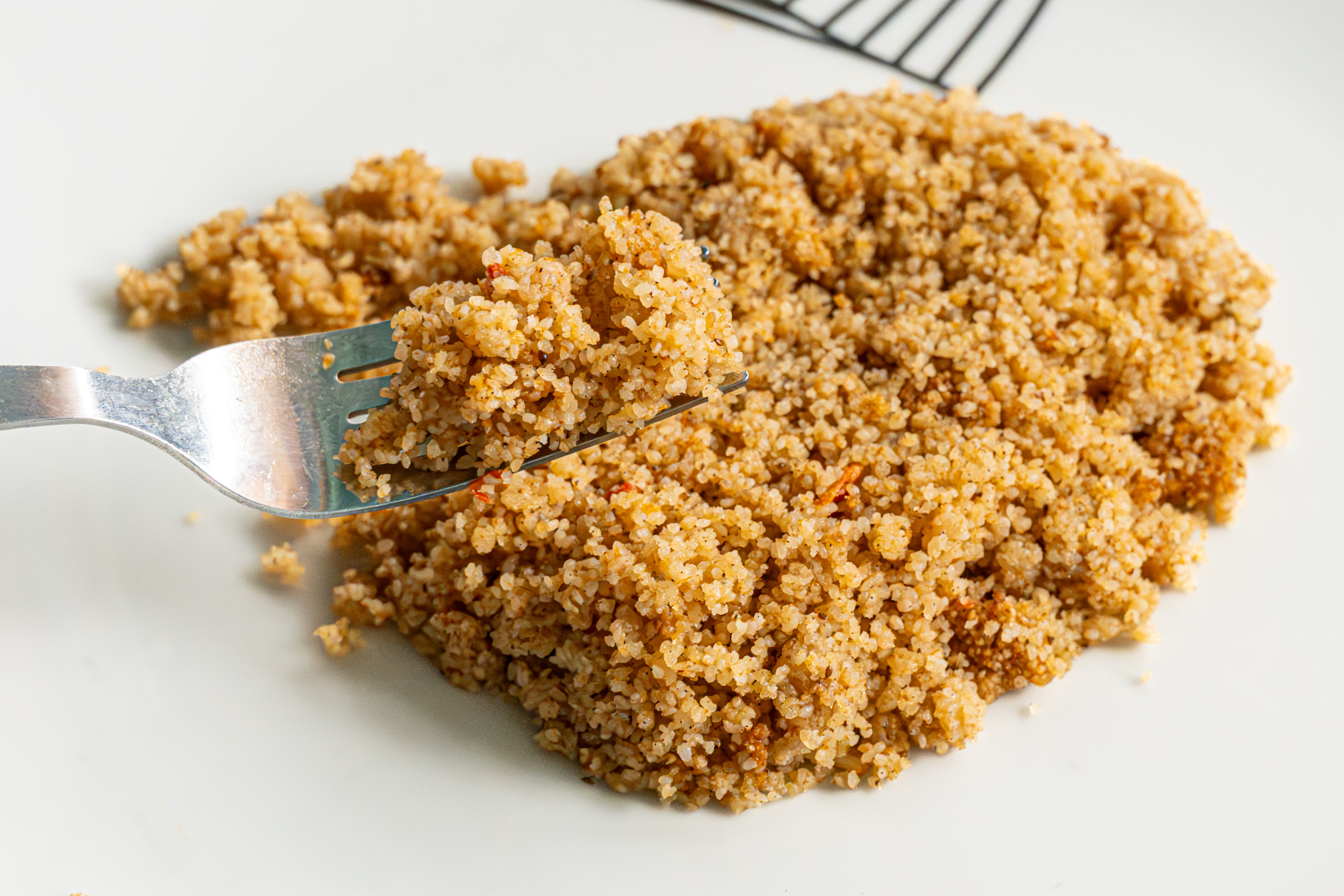
Fonio couscous served at the Restaurant du Fonio in Natitingou, Benin

Before consumption, fonio grains must be processed using mechanical (dehusking, milling) or thermal (precooking, parboiling, roasting) methods. Depending on the processing method, the nutrient value may be affected.

Regarding the macronutrients, the carbohydrate content remains higher when the grains are precooked rather than roasted. The protein content is much lower after milling because the bran that gets removed contains a lot of protein. The highest protein content is achieved when parboiling. The lipid content is increased when roasted and decreased when milled or precooked.

Regarding micronutrients, the iron and zinc content remains the highest when parboiled while milling leads to a loss due to the removal of the bran. Phytate, an anti-nutritional factor that inhibits the absorption of minerals like iron and zinc, is reduced by washing and cooking but is still high enough to inhibit adequate mineral absorption.

Generally, parboiled fonio shows the best nutritional composition when compared to the other processing methods. However, parboiling fonio does not lead to as efficient redistribution of nutrients as is the case with parboiled rice. Additionally, the process of parboiling changes the color of the fonio grains which is disliked by some consumers.

== Commercialization outside Africa ==
A bag of Yolélé Foods' fonio, which was purchased from a luxury American supermarket

Fonio has been relatively unknown outside the African continent until recently, when companies in Europe and the United States began to import the grain from West Africa, often citing its ecological and nutritional benefits in their marketing.

=== European Union ===
In December 2018, the European Commission approved commercialization of fonio as a novel food in the European Union, after submission by the Italian company Obà Food to manufacture and market new food products. These products include fonio pasta, revealing a desire to change fonio to be more recognizable to the European palate.

Since this initial approval, fonio has gradually become more popular and more accessible in Europe. By 2021, the EU was importing 422 metric tonnes (465.2 tons) of fonio, a significant increase from the 172 metric tonnes (189.6 tons) imported in 2016.

=== United States ===
In the United States, Yolélé Foods, led by Senegalese-American chef Pierre Thiam, started importing and selling fonio in 2017. Thiam has stated that he hopes to introduce Americans to the grain while supporting sustainable and traditional agriculture in Burkina Faso, Ghana, Mali and Senegal.

== See also ==
- Digitaria compacta – Species of grass also known as raishan
- Digitaria sanguinalis – Species of grass sometimes used as a crop
- Teff – Edible annual grass native to Ethiopia and Eritrea
