= Digitaria jubata =

Scientific classification
- Kingdom: Plantae
- Clade: Embryophytes
- Clade: Tracheophytes
- Clade: Spermatophytes
- Clade: Angiosperms
- Clade: Monocots
- Clade: Commelinids
- Order: Poales
- Family: Poaceae
- Subfamily: Panicoideae
- Genus: Digitaria
- Species: D. jubata

Binomial name
- Digitaria jubata (Griseb.) Henrard

Synonyms
- Paspalum jubatum Griseb.; Digitaria jubata var. brevigluma H.Peng ex Li S.Wang

Species of grass

Digitaria jubata is a species of annual grass in the genus of Digitaria, native to Myanmar, south-central China, and Assam, India.

== Description ==
Digitaria jubata grows from 80 to 110 cm (31 to 43 in) tall, with prop roots.
