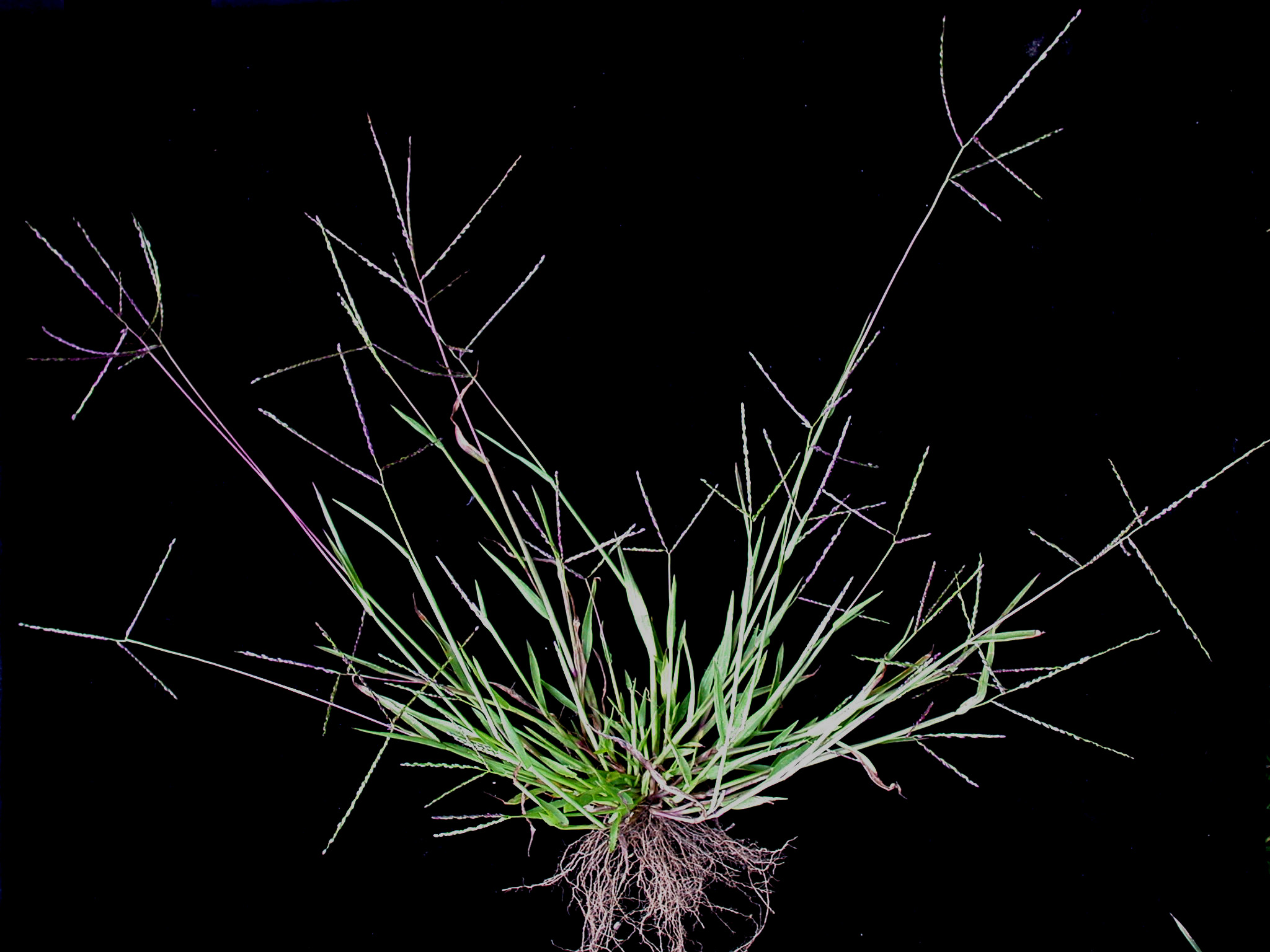

Scientific classification
- Kingdom: Plantae
- Clade: Tracheophytes
- Clade: Angiosperms
- Clade: Monocots
- Clade: Commelinids
- Order: Poales
- Family: Poaceae
- Subfamily: Panicoideae
- Genus: Digitaria
- Species: D. ischaemum

Binomial name
- Digitaria ischaemum (Schreb.) Schreb. ex Muhl.

Synonyms
- Panicum ischaemum Syntherisma ischaemum

= Digitaria ischaemum =

Species of plant

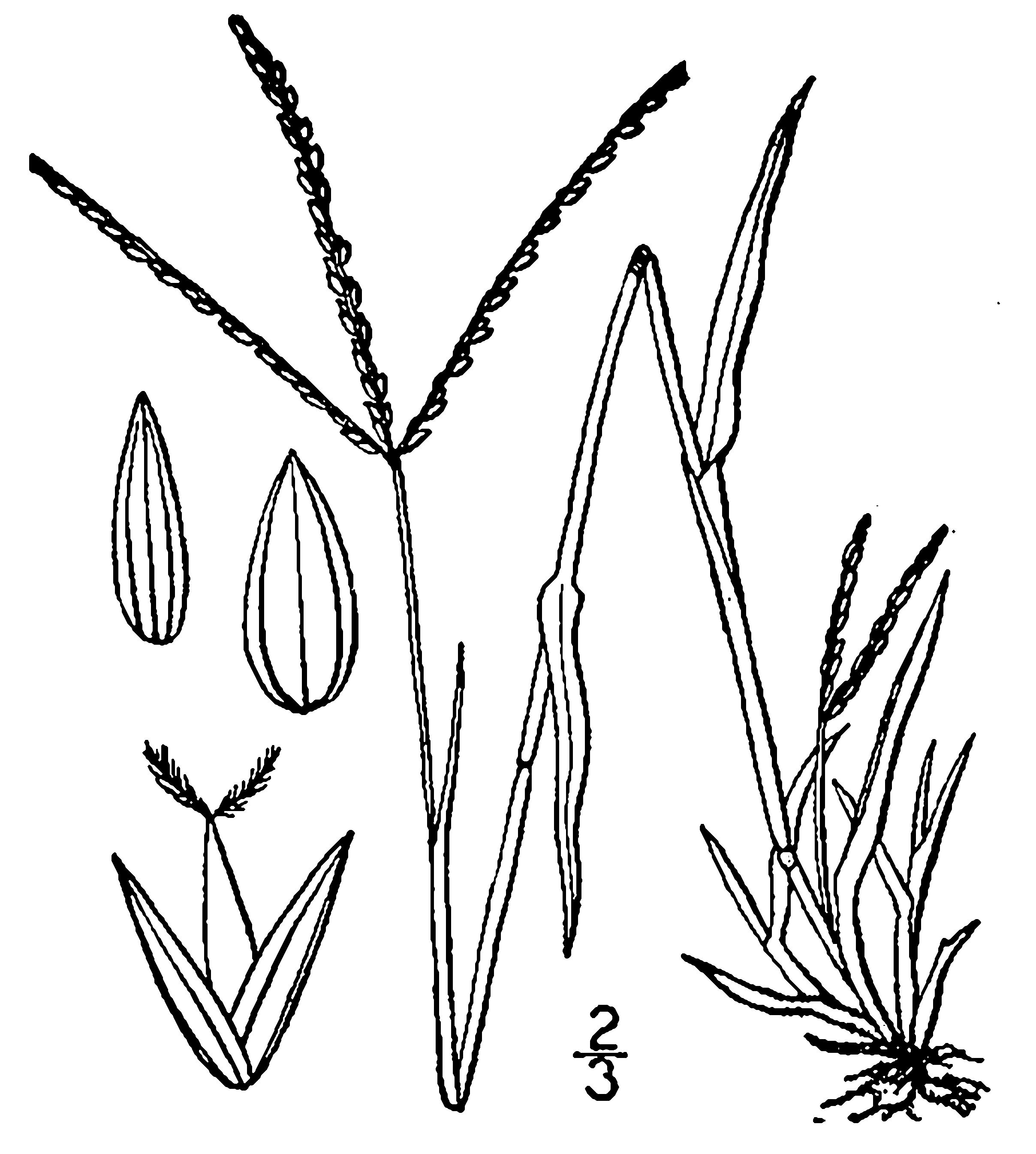
Illustration

Digitaria ischaemum is a species of crabgrass known by the common names smooth crabgrass and small crabgrass. It is native to Europe and Asia, but it is known throughout much of the warm temperate world as an introduced species and often a common roadside and garden weed. It is an annual grass producing an inflorescence with two or more narrow branches lined with tiny spikelets.

It is easily confused with other members in the genus, particularly southern crabgrass in California which differs by having spikelets of nearly twice the length. It may also be confused with Bermuda Grass, but differs in being a much taller plant with a much longer inflorescence. It reproduces by seed. The leaves on this grass often form above the base of the plant, and it is usually singular, rarely forming large clumps.

== Description ==
The flowers of smooth crabgrass grow in clusters of 2 to 6, forming spike-like shapes about 1½ to 4 inches long, arranged like fingers at the tips of branching stems. The flower spikelets are small, egg-shaped, and come in pairs along the stem, with one on a short stalk and the other on a longer one. Each spikelet has one fertile flower. The small bracts at the base of each spikelet are uneven in size, with one being almost invisible or absent and the other covered in short hairs. The bracts around the flowers are similarly sized, with one being hairy and the other having tiny pits. The flower styles and stamens extend from the tip of the spikelet. The stem holding the spikes is green or purple, winged, and about 1 mm wide, with all the spikelets arranged on one side of the stem.

The leaves of smooth crabgrass are arranged alternately, up to 4 inches long and ¼ inch wide, mostly flat and hairless except at the base. The leaf sheaths are open in the front, sometimes with a few long hairs near the top but mostly hairless, and they loosely wrap around the stem, often having a ridge along the back. The ligule is white and very short, less than 1 mm. The stems (culms) are hairless, branch out from the base, and are mostly light green but may be purple near the base. The stems often spread outward and may root at the joints (nodes), which are hairless and can be green or purplish.

As smooth crabgrass matures, its spikelets turn dark purple. The missing first glume and the hairs on the second glume and lemma become more noticeable. The seeds are oval-shaped and dark brown to almost black.

== Habitat ==
They grow in terrestrial regions and can be seen in central Europe and Japan, Connecticut, Maine, Massachusetts, New Hampshire, Rhode Island, Vermont.
