= Digitaria stenotaphrodes =

Scientific classification
- Kingdom: Plantae
- Clade: Tracheophytes
- Clade: Angiosperms
- Clade: Monocots
- Clade: Commelinids
- Order: Poales
- Family: Poaceae
- Subfamily: Panicoideae
- Genus: Digitaria
- Species: D. stenotaphrodes

Binomial name
- Digitaria stenotaphrodes (Nees ex Steud.) Stapf

Synonyms
- Digitaria pacifica Stapf; Panicum stenotaphrodes Nees ex Steud.; Syntherisma pelagica F.Br.; Syntherisma stenotaphroides (Nees ex Steud.) Chase

Species of flowering plant

Digitaria stenotaphrodes is a species of perennial flowering plant in the family Poaceae. It is native to the western and south-central Pacific.

== Taxonomy ==
The species was first described in 1853, as Panicum stenotaphrodes, by Christian Nees von Esenbeck. It was transferred to Digitaria in 1906 by Otto Stapf, who used the name Digitaria pacifica for it, and considered the species to be closely related to Digitaria platycarpha.

== Description ==
Digitaria stenotaphrodes is a perennial flowering plant whose culms reach lengths of 30–90 cm (12–35 in). The leaf sheath is covered in soft hair, while the ligule, 2–2.5 mm (0.079–0.098 in) in length, is without hair. The leaf blades are linear, potentially with a pointed tip, and measure 5–20 cm (2.0–7.9 in) in length and 3–6 mm (0.12–0.24 in) in width. The inflorescences are composed of 3–6 racemes that are 4–10 cm (1.6–3.9 in) long and 2–4 mm (0.079–0.157 in) wide, broadly winged rachis that form pockets by folding longitudinally to embrace the spikelets, which are 2.5–3.5 mm (0.098–0.138 in) long and have one basal sterile florets and one fertile florets each.

== Distribution ==
The plant is found in the Gilbert Islands, Phoenix Islands and Line Islands of Kiribati and the United States, in Tokelau, on Manihiki in the Cook Islands, in Tuvalu, in the Society Islands and Tuamotus of French Polynesia, and the Caroline Islands of Micronesia and Palau. The species is classed as not threatened with a high confidence level under the Angiosperm Extinction Risk Predictions model, but has not been formally assessed as of 2026.
