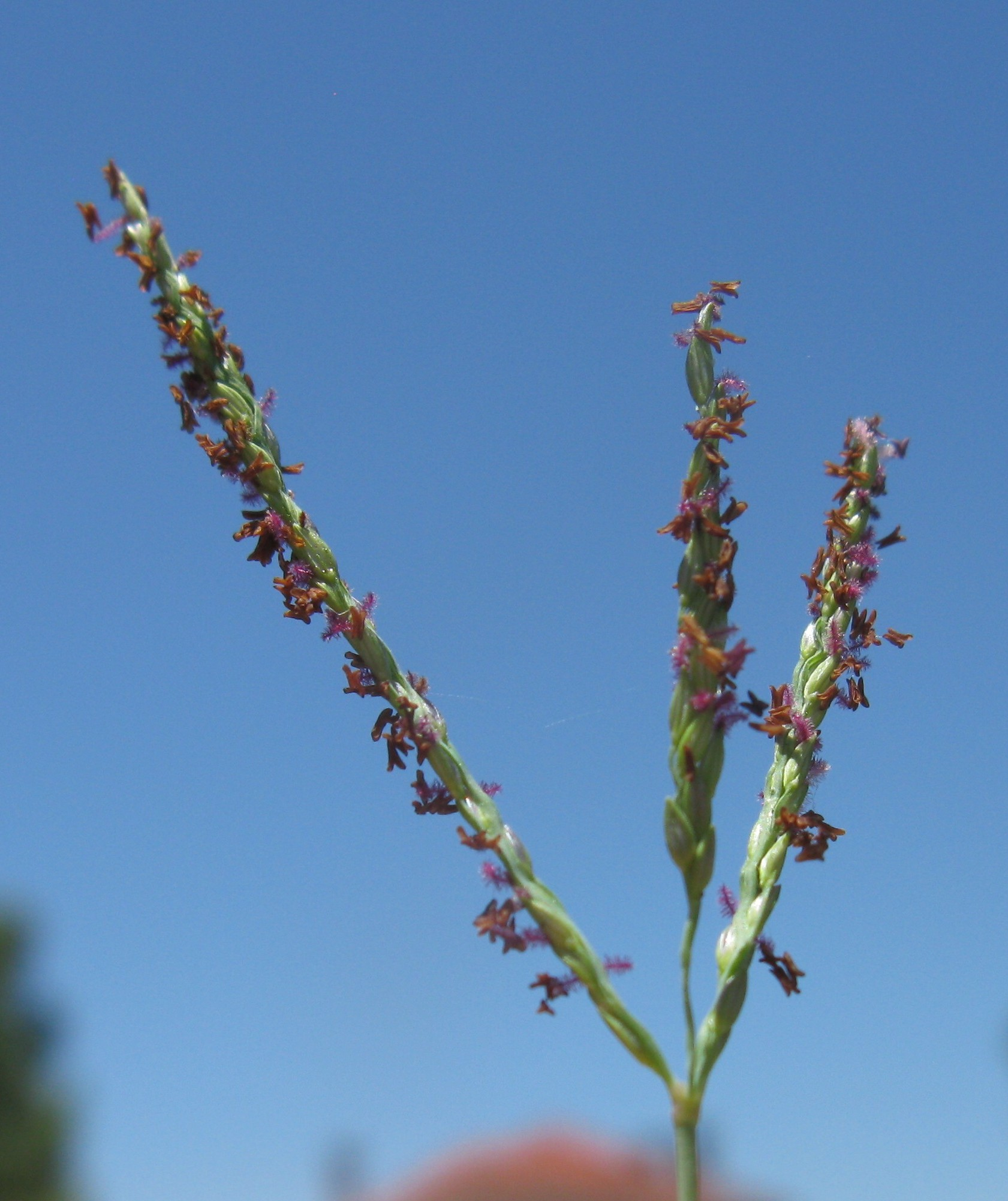

Scientific classification
- Kingdom: Plantae
- Clade: Embryophytes
- Clade: Tracheophytes
- Clade: Angiosperms
- Clade: Monocots
- Clade: Commelinids
- Order: Poales
- Family: Poaceae
- Subfamily: Panicoideae
- Genus: Digitaria
- Species: D. didactyla

Binomial name
- Digitaria didactyla Willd.

Synonyms
- Panicum bicorne Panicum didactylum Panicum tennuissimum

= Digitaria didactyla =

Species of flowering plant

Digitaria didactyla is a species of grass known by the common names blue couch, Queensland blue couch, blue serangoon grass, green serangoon grass, blue stargrass, and petit gazon (in Mauritius). It is native to Mauritius, Réunion, parts of mainland Africa, and Madagascar. It has been introduced widely outside its native range, mainly for use as a pasture and turf grass. It has naturalized in some regions.

== Description ==
This species is a mat-forming perennial grass with rhizomes and stolons. The stems can reach up to 63 centimeters long, but are generally 15 to 30 centimeters, with a creeping form, extending along the ground and rooting at the stem nodes. The narrow leaf blades are up to 7 centimeters long, usually hairless, and green to blue-green in color. The inflorescence has 2 to 4 thin, finger-like branches each up to 7 to 10 centimeters long. They are lined with pairs of small spikelets each under 3 millimeters long. The grass can grow into a dense, leafy stand up to 20 centimeters tall unless it is kept down, for example, with grazing.

This species is similar to southern crabgrass (Digitaria ciliaris), but with fewer, narrower inflorescence branches. It is also similar to bermudagrass (Cynodon dactylon), but with shorter, wider leaves which are more blue in color.

== Biology ==
This grass can tolerate many soil types, including low-nutrient and low-pH substrates, but it does best in lighter soils. It thrives in granitic sands. It is somewhat tolerant of shade and occasional flooding. It usually persists in dry conditions, but it may drop its leaves. Frost shrivels the leaves. The grass is very tolerant of grazing and mowing.

A rhizomatous and stoloniferous species, it spreads easily via vegetative reproduction. It also produces seeds, which can be spread in the dung of grazing cattle and remain viable in the soil.

Though it does not necessarily require fertilizer, the grass responds well to supplemental nitrogen. Good companion plants include legumes such as three-flower beggarweed (Desmodium triflorum), glycines (Glycine spp.), pinto peanut (Arachis pintoi), Australian jointvetch (Aeschynomene falcata), Brazilian stylo (Stylosanthes guianensis), lotononis (Lotononis bainesii), round-leaf cassia (Chamaecrista rotundifolia), and white clover (Trifolium repens).

Pathogens seen in this grass include grey mould and the digitaria striate mosaic virus, a mastrevirus of the family Geminiviridae which is transmitted by the leafhopper Nesoclutha pallida. Pests include spider mites of genus Oligonychus.

== Uses ==
This species has long been used as a pasture grass for grazing livestock. Animals find it palatable. It is also planted as a lawn and used as golf course turf. It is thought to be "one of the most popular lawn grasses in Queensland." It may be used as other forms of groundcover. It is very good for erosion control.

Cultivars include 'Aussiblue' and 'Tropika', grey-green grass breeds recommended for turf use.

== Swazi grass ==
Digitaria swazilandensis (swazi grass, Swaziland fingergrass) is sometimes considered to be a subspecies of D. didactyla. Other authorities treat it as a species in its own right, but it has similar uses to D. didactyla. It is coarser in texture, bulkier, and less blue in color. Its stolons are less robust but it produces less seed and spreads vegetatively more often. It is more tolerant of soil salinity and more resistant to diseases.
