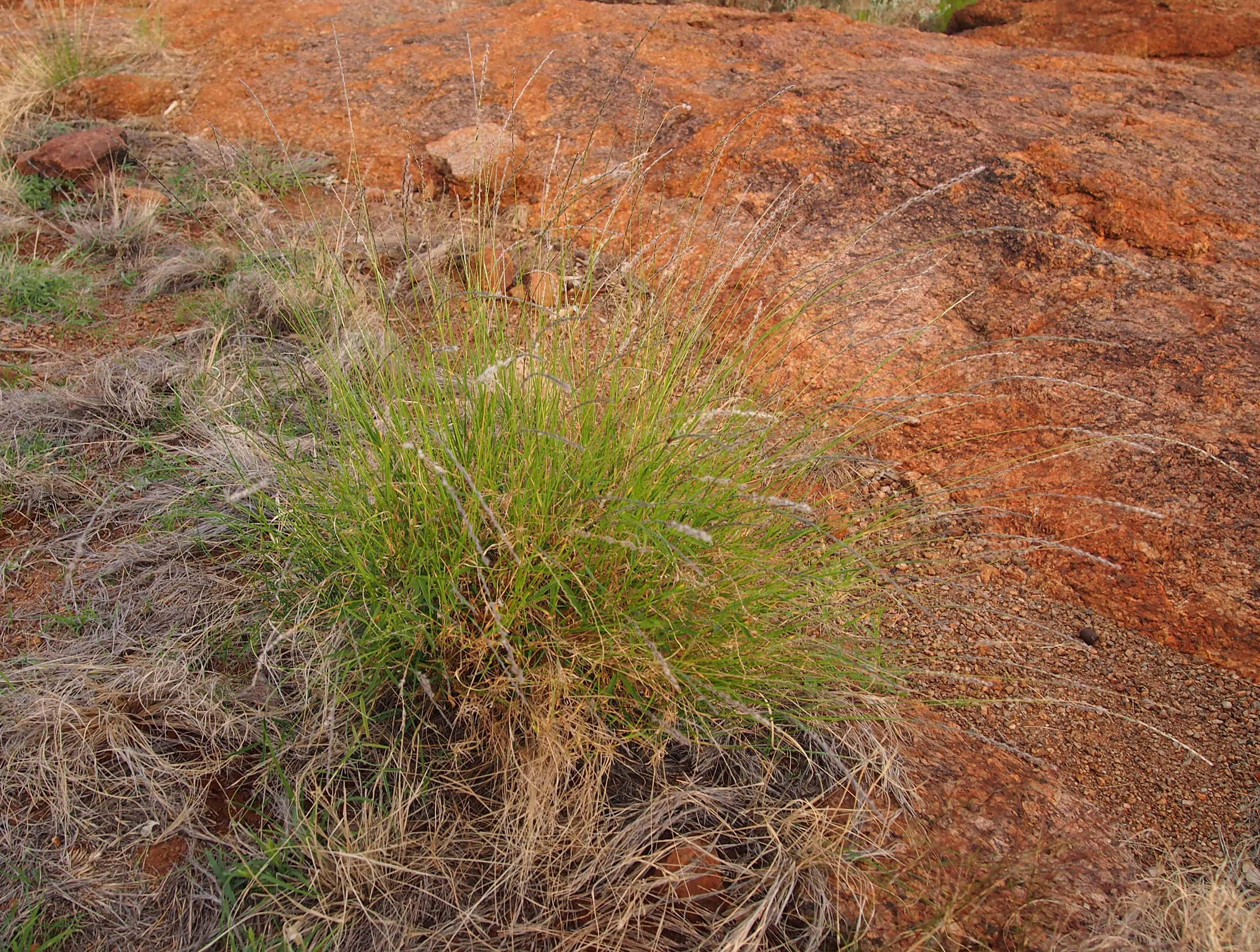

Scientific classification
- Kingdom: Plantae
- Clade: Tracheophytes
- Clade: Angiosperms
- Clade: Monocots
- Clade: Commelinids
- Order: Poales
- Family: Poaceae
- Subfamily: Panicoideae
- Genus: Digitaria
- Species: D. brownii

Binomial name
- Digitaria brownii D.Popenoe (1923)

Synonyms
- Panicum brownii Trichachne brownii Panicum glareae Panicum laniflorum Panicum villosum

= Digitaria brownii =

Species of grass

Digitaria brownii, also known as cotton grass or cotton panic grass, is a species of perennial grass in the genus of Digitaria.

== Description ==
The maximum height for D. brownii is 1.0 m (3 ft 3 in) with the average height being 0.498 m (1 ft 7.6 in). Its flat hairless leaves are 300–160 mm (11.8–6.3 in) in length and 1–7 mm (0.039–0.276 in) wide, with rough and wavy margins, and a drawn-out straight point. It has 2–4 mm (0.079–0.157 in) spikelets, with white, brownish, or purple hairs.

== Distribution and habitat ==
Digitaria brownii is indigenous to all states of Australia except for Tasmania. Additionally, it has been introduced to India. It grows well in sandy and loamy clay soils.
