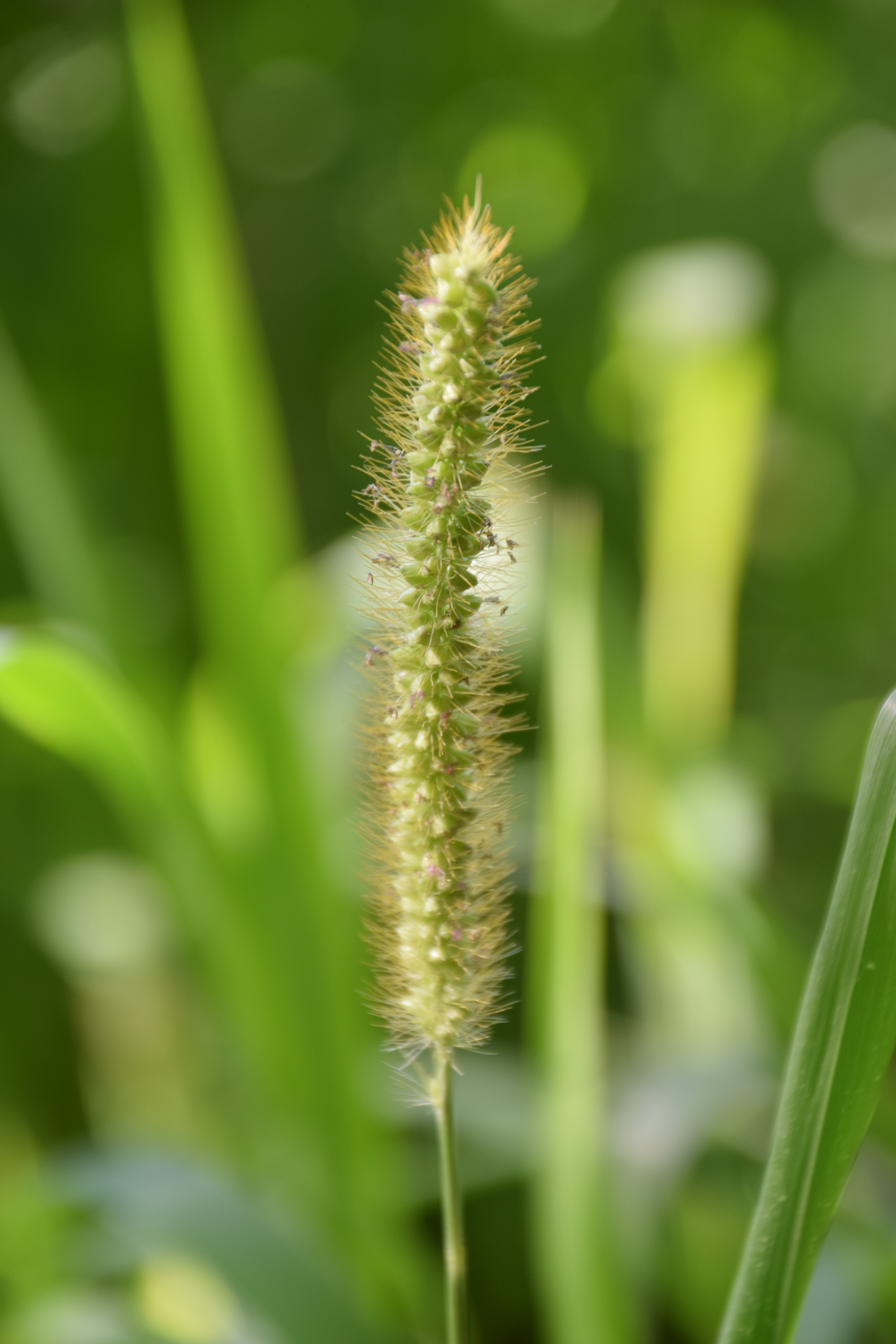

Scientific classification
- Kingdom: Plantae
- Clade: Embryophytes
- Clade: Tracheophytes
- Clade: Spermatophytes
- Clade: Angiosperms
- Clade: Monocots
- Clade: Commelinids
- Order: Poales
- Family: Poaceae
- Subfamily: Panicoideae
- Genus: Digitaria
- Species: D. iburua

Binomial name
- Digitaria iburua Stapf

= Digitaria iburua =

Species of grass

Digitaria iburua, commonly known as iburu, is a grass species native to west and west-central tropical Africa, which is cultivated as a grain crop known as black fonio.

Iburu (D. iburua) is closely related to white fonio (D. exilis), a cereal that is more widely grown across West Africa. However, Iburu is taller than fonio, but has smaller grain than fonio. This makes harvesting the grains very labor-intensive. Iburu is mainly grown in the Middle Belt of central Nigeria, as well as in Zinder, Niger.

== See also ==
- Digitaria compacta, raishan, used as a grain crop in northeast India
- Digitaria exilis, white fonio, also used as a grain crop in West Africa
- Digitaria longiflora, the wild progenitor of Digitaria exilis
- Digitaria sanguinalis, considered a weed around the world, but traditionally used as a grain crop in Europe
