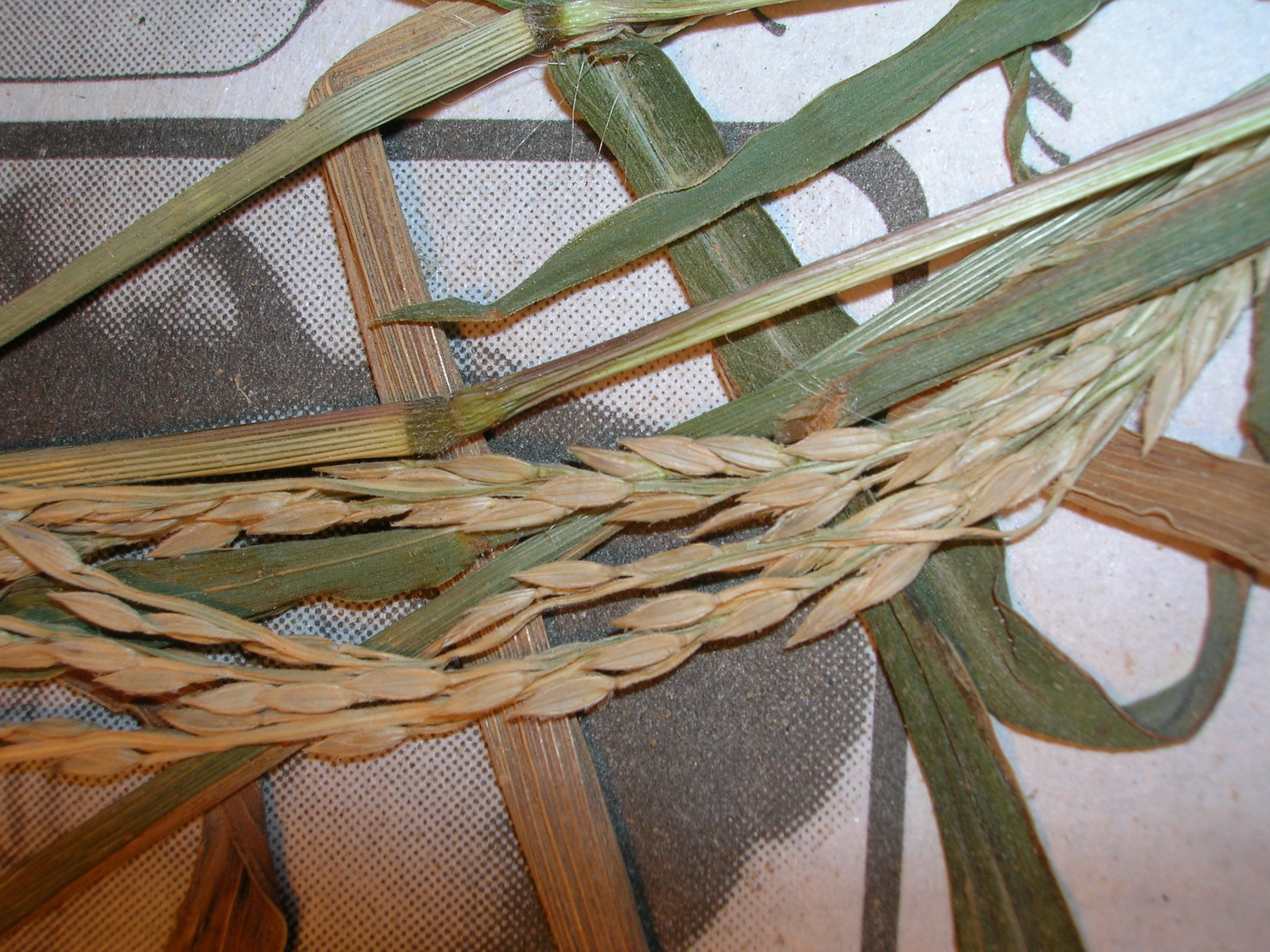

Scientific classification
- Kingdom: Plantae
- Clade: Embryophytes
- Clade: Tracheophytes
- Clade: Angiosperms
- Clade: Monocots
- Clade: Commelinids
- Order: Poales
- Family: Poaceae
- Subfamily: Panicoideae
- Genus: Digitaria
- Species: D. setigera

Binomial name
- Digitaria setigera Roth ex Roem. & Schult.

= Digitaria setigera =

Species of plant

Digitaria setigera, also more commonly called East Indian crabgrass, is a species of perennial grass in the family of Poaceae.

It was an introduced weed spread across Polynesia with native agriculture. In the Hawaiian Islands, the plant known as kūkaepuaʻa ("pig poop") became associated with the fertility deity Kamapuaʻa as its tangible form (kinolau).

== Description ==
Digitaria setigera has cauline leaves that are a little over 30mm (1.1 inches) long and 3mm (0.1 inches) wide. It also has spikelets that consist of 3-16 spike-like branches.

== Distribution ==
This species of grass is native to many subtropical regions such as Africa, Temperate Asia, Tropical Asia, Australasia, India, and Bangladesh. Additionally, it is native to Australia, where it is found in Northern Territory and Queensland.
