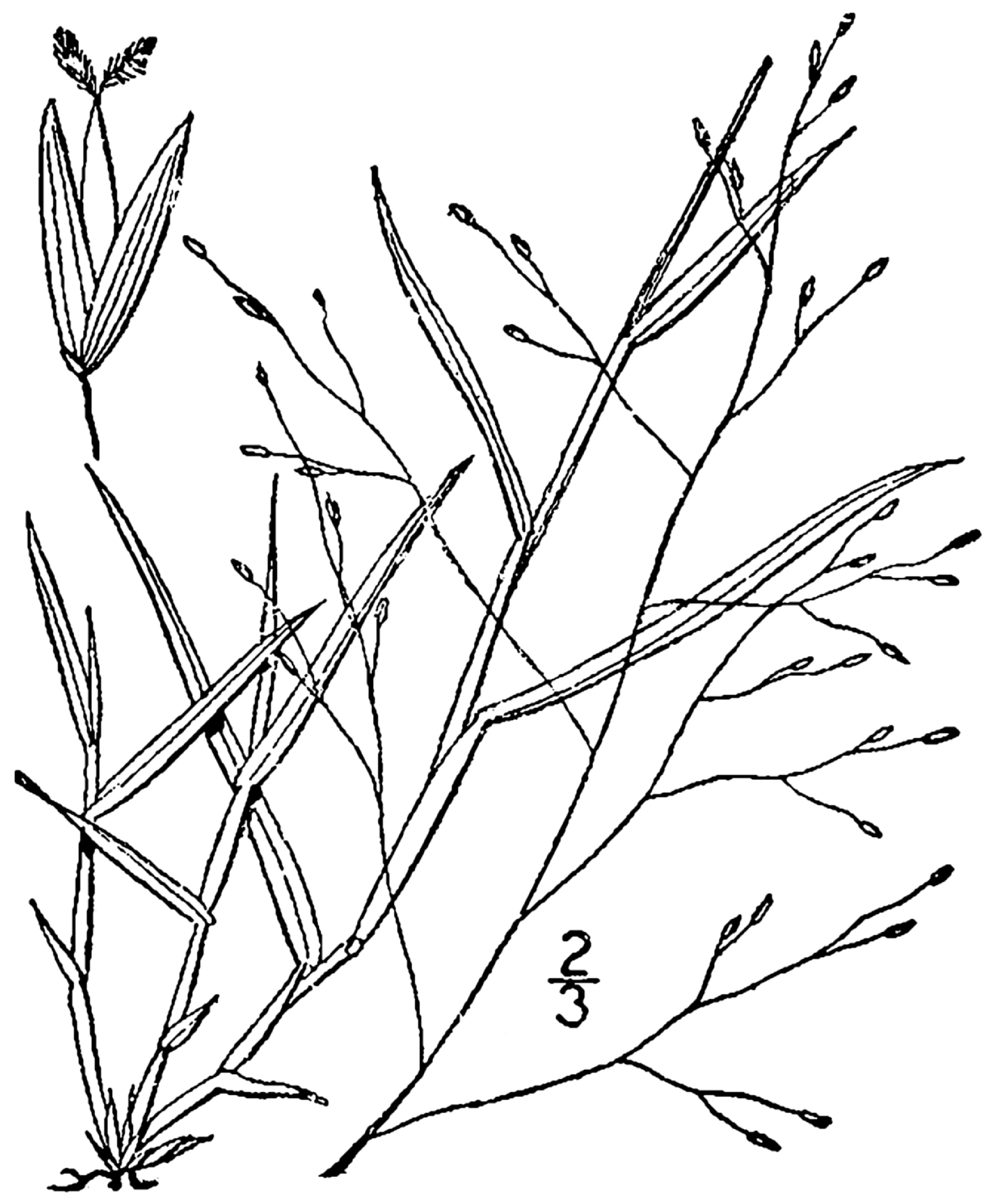
- 1913 illustration

Conservation status
- Secure (NatureServe)

Scientific classification
- Kingdom: Plantae
- Clade: Tracheophytes
- Clade: Angiosperms
- Clade: Monocots
- Clade: Commelinids
- Order: Poales
- Family: Poaceae
- Subfamily: Panicoideae
- Genus: Digitaria
- Species: D. cognata

Binomial name
- Digitaria cognata (Schult.) Pilg.

Synonyms
- Leptoloma cognatum

= Digitaria cognata =

Species of flowering plant

Digitaria cognata is a species of grass known by the common names fall witchgrass, Carolina crabgrass, and mountain hairgrass.

== Description ==
This grass is a perennial without rhizomes. The roots are shallow. The erect stems grow up to 56 centimeters tall. The stem bases are tough and hairy. The leaves are up to 12.6 centimeters long. They are narrow, with "one side wavy, and the other smooth". The inflorescence is a purple-tinged panicle with single-flowered spikelets.

== Uses ==
This grass provides graze for livestock and wild ungulates, and birds eat the seeds.
