= Digitaria gracillima =

Conservation status
- Imperiled (NatureServe)

Scientific classification
- Kingdom: Plantae
- Clade: Tracheophytes
- Clade: Angiosperms
- Clade: Monocots
- Clade: Commelinids
- Order: Poales
- Family: Poaceae
- Subfamily: Panicoideae
- Genus: Digitaria
- Species: D. gracillima

Binomial name
- Digitaria gracillima (Scribn.) Fernald

Species of flowering plant

Digitaria gracillima, commonly referred to as longleaf crabgrass, is a rare species of crabgrass endemic to Florida in the US.

== Habitat ==
It is known to grow in the sandy, xeric fire-dependent habitats of the peninsula, including Florida scrub and longleaf pine sandhill.

== Conservation ==
Vouchered specimens have been collected from Polk, Osceola, Lake, and possibly Sumter and Miami-Dade counties. The type specimen was collected in the vicinity of Lake Eustis, where it is thought to be less likely to persist due to extensive habitat loss to development.

It is currently only known from 4 sites, all of which are on conserved land which is adequately maintained where populations seem relatively safe. However, there is little information regarding population sizes and trends. It's unknown why the species isn't present on other conserved sites with appropriate habitat and management.

The locales with likely the best viability are in Highlands County, particularly Avon Park Air Force Range and Highlands Hammock State Park, where habitat is abundant and well-managed.
