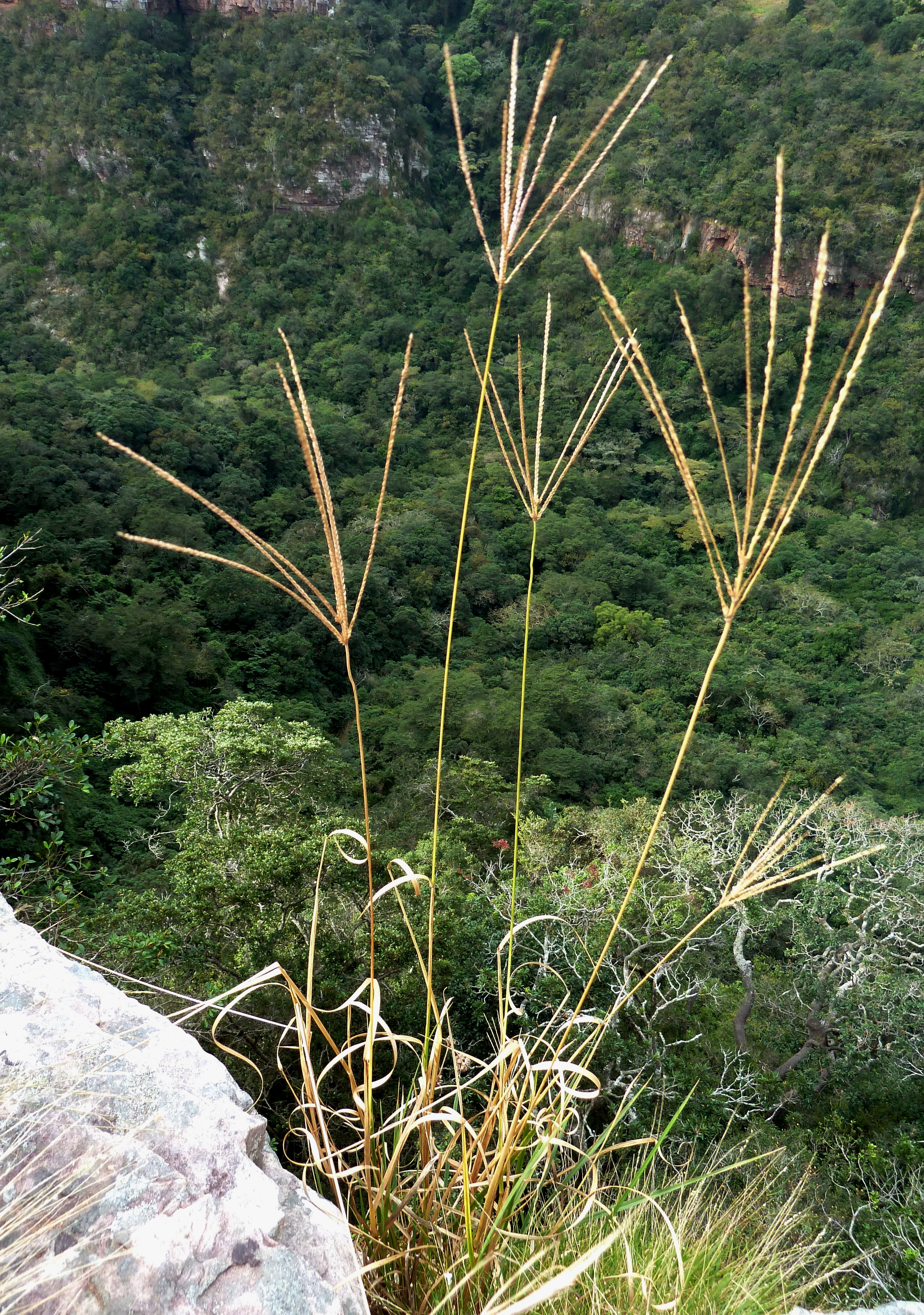

Scientific classification
- Kingdom: Plantae
- Clade: Tracheophytes
- Clade: Angiosperms
- Clade: Monocots
- Clade: Commelinids
- Order: Poales
- Family: Poaceae
- Subfamily: Panicoideae
- Genus: Digitaria
- Species: D. eriantha

Binomial name
- Digitaria eriantha Steud.

Subspecies and varieties
- D. e. subsp. eriantha; D. e. subsp. pentzii (Stent) Kok; D. e. var. stolonifera Stapf

Synonyms
- Digitaria bechuanica (Stent) Henrard; Digitaria decumbens Stent; Digitaria dinteri Henrard; Digitaria geniculata Stent; Digitaria glauca Stent; Digitaria hiascens Mez; Digitaria livida Henrard; Digitaria nemoralis Henrard; Digitaria pentzii Stent; Digitaria smutsii Stent; Digitaria stentiana Henrard; Digitaria umfolozi D.W.Hall; Digitaria valida Stent; Syntherisma erianthum (Steud.) Newbold

= Digitaria eriantha =

Species of grass

Digitaria eriantha, commonly known as digitgrass or Pangola-grass, is a grass grown in tropical and subtropical climates. It grows relatively well in various soils, but grows especially well in moist soils. It is tolerant to droughts, water lodging, suppresses weeds and grows relatively quickly after grazing. This grass demonstrates great potential for farmers in Africa in subtropical and tropical climates, mostly for livestock feed.

== Description ==
Digitaria eriantha is a monocot and in the family of Poaceae. "It is perennial, sometimes stoloniferous or tufted". This grass grows a dense tussock with extended stolons, which are covered with hairs or without hairs. Each grass, erect or ascending, reaches between 35 and 180 cm tall. The lowest basal leaf sheaths are densely hairy, or very rarely smooth. The leaf blades are typically 5–60 cm long, 2–14 mm wide and may be either hairy or smooth. Each inflorescence typically has six or seven spicate branches, each of which carries numerous florets. These spikelets are usually 2–4 mm long, where the lower glume is as long as the spikelet and the upper glumes are where the lemma is situated (covered with 1 mm long hairs).

== History, geography and ethnography ==
Digit grass is native to Africa, in countries such as Angola, Botswana, Mozambique, South Africa, Zimbabwe, Namibia and Eswatini. It is also cultivated in Australia and Argentina. Today, it is distributed in many humid subtropical and tropical areas. There are many others names for D. eriantha, such as common finger grass, digit grass, pangola grass, woolly finger grass (English), digitaria (French), pangolagras (German) and pangola, pasto pangola (Spanish).

== Growing conditions ==
The seeds require a clean seedbed for establishment and all seed needs to be evenly distributed when sowing in order to reduce competition in their early stages. Digit grass can grow in a variety of soils, ranging from sands to heavy clay. However, seeds are better adapted to sandy loam soils compared to heavier soils because seedling establishment is easier. Once established, seedling can grow vigorously on clay soils.

Digit grass has low to moderate salt/alkalinity tolerance and moderate tolerance of aluminum. This grass thrives in warm, moist environments where it will generally grow very quickly. The ideal rainfall requirement is estimated to be 450 mm and for seeds about 750 mm. Weeds are typically suppressed. Digit grass responds well to nitrogen and will persist on infertile soils but yields will be low. The estimated appropriate soil pH is >4.2. The ideal condition for the digit grass is full sun and well-drained moist soils. The sufficient amount of nitrogen fertilizer is estimated at between 100 and 300 kg/ha N. This amount should be applied at different times, rather than a single application at the start of the season. It is also important to monitor levels of phosphorus and other nutrients throughout the entire growing season.

== Farming issues ==
Digitaria eriantha is sensitive to photoperiod and therefore requires ample sunshine for fast growth. Most types have low shade tolerance. The productivity of digit grass is higher in the warmer compared to the cool seasons. In the warm season, digit grass can withstand high trampling, high stocking density and 30 day rotations. In the cool season, a 60-day rotation is recommended for high production. As it grows fairly quickly with sufficient sunshine, it ideally needs to be grazed every 2–3 weeks. The crop offers great potential to poor farmers due to its potential for fairly high yield, and the low labour required to sustain production and pasture health.

== Stress tolerance ==
Digitaria eriantha has moderate to high drought tolerance, which demonstrates great potential for those who live in arid or semi-arid climates, such as Sub-Saharan Africa. Though it is fairly tolerant to low rainfall, it restricts production and yield. Digit grass is also quite tolerant of flooding and waterlogging. Therefore, digit grass also shows great promise in subtropical and tropical areas where rainfall is heavier and in short burst. Furthermore, it is considered to have low shade tolerance. Some genotypes have become more tolerant than others, more specifically D. setivalva in Malaysia is rated medium for shade tolerance. In sunny climates, like Sub-Saharan Africa, D. eriantha would grow well due to heavy sunlight and low shade. Digit grass generally is also frost sensitive, where many genotypes show differences in frost tolerance. Frost affects the grasses ability to regrow after frosting.

== Major weeds, pests and diseases ==
Digitaria eriantha is susceptible to the rust Puccinia oahuensis which is a widespread disease found in the Americas and Australia. This varies among genotypes. Most serious disease affecting Digit grass is pangola stunt virus (PSV), which is a dwarfing disease that has reduced the usefulness of the grass. There have been some genotypes that have demonstrated some resistance to this disease. Digit grass is attacked by white-backed planthopper (Sogatella furcifera) or S. kolophon. Symptoms of an infected grass are: "stunting, yellowing, reddening, twisting of leaves, swelling of small veins, and excessive tillering". Other insects and pests affecting D. eriantha are as follows: spittlebugs (Tomaspis spp.), Rhodes grass mealy bug (Antonina graminis), chinch bug (Blissus leucopterus), sugar-cane aphid (Sipha flava), armyworms, root-knot nematodes and smut fungi. Typically, it is the digit grass seed’s head that will be infected by smut and only under humid conditions.

== Genetic stocks ==
There have been many countries that have developed cultivars of D. eriantha. Australia developed ‘Advance’, a synthetic hybrid with a faster maturation. A cultivar of Milanje finger grass (D. setivalva), formally denoted as 'Mardi' in Malaysia, is used for its high production in wet tropics. Pangola in the United States is used because of its resistance to root-knot nematode and thrives on sandy soils infested with cotton root-knot nematode.

== Uses ==
Usually digit grass is used for hay and pasture. It can withstand very heavy grazing and grows quite quickly.

== Nutritional information ==
Digitaria eriantha is considered to be of very high quality within the class of tropical grasses. After cutting, digit grass has 12.1% crude protein and decreases to 5.0% if used in the water for animal feed. Typically per 100 g, the forage contains 10.8 g of protein, 2.0 g of fat, 74.4 g of carbohydrate, 29.8 g of fiber, 450 mg of calcium and 350 mg of phosphorus.

== Economics ==
Most D. eriantha yields are affected by slopes, where the direction of bulldozing affected the yield size. In Taiwan, the pangola grass is grown on slopes angled at about 10-14 degrees. When bulldozed across the slope, the yield was higher than when it was bulldozed down the field. The first and second cuttings typically produce the highest yields, while the next three averages about the same amount.

== Constraints to wider adoption ==
Most yields harvested in the fall were lower in protein, but application of nitrogen 3 weeks before grazing increased digestible crude protein and consumption rates. Therefore, though D. eriantha can be stored quite easily, it loses crude protein over time. Thus it is essential to use the grazed digit grass sooner rather than later.

== Practical information: tips and solutions ==
Tufted types generally combine well with other crops, more specifically legumes. Stoloniferous types of D. eriantha typically can be very competitive and suppress companion crops. D. eriantha can also be used to suppress weeds. This is a great advantage for poor farmers with soils that are prone to many weeds that can be difficult to control. All genotypes are very tolerant of heavy grazing, where regular grazing is required to maintain quality and minimize diseases/pests. The best height to keep the grass at is between 10–15 cm and 30–40 cm. Thus, if this grass is grazed on time, this crop has great potential for poor farmers who require large yields for their livestock or pasture.
