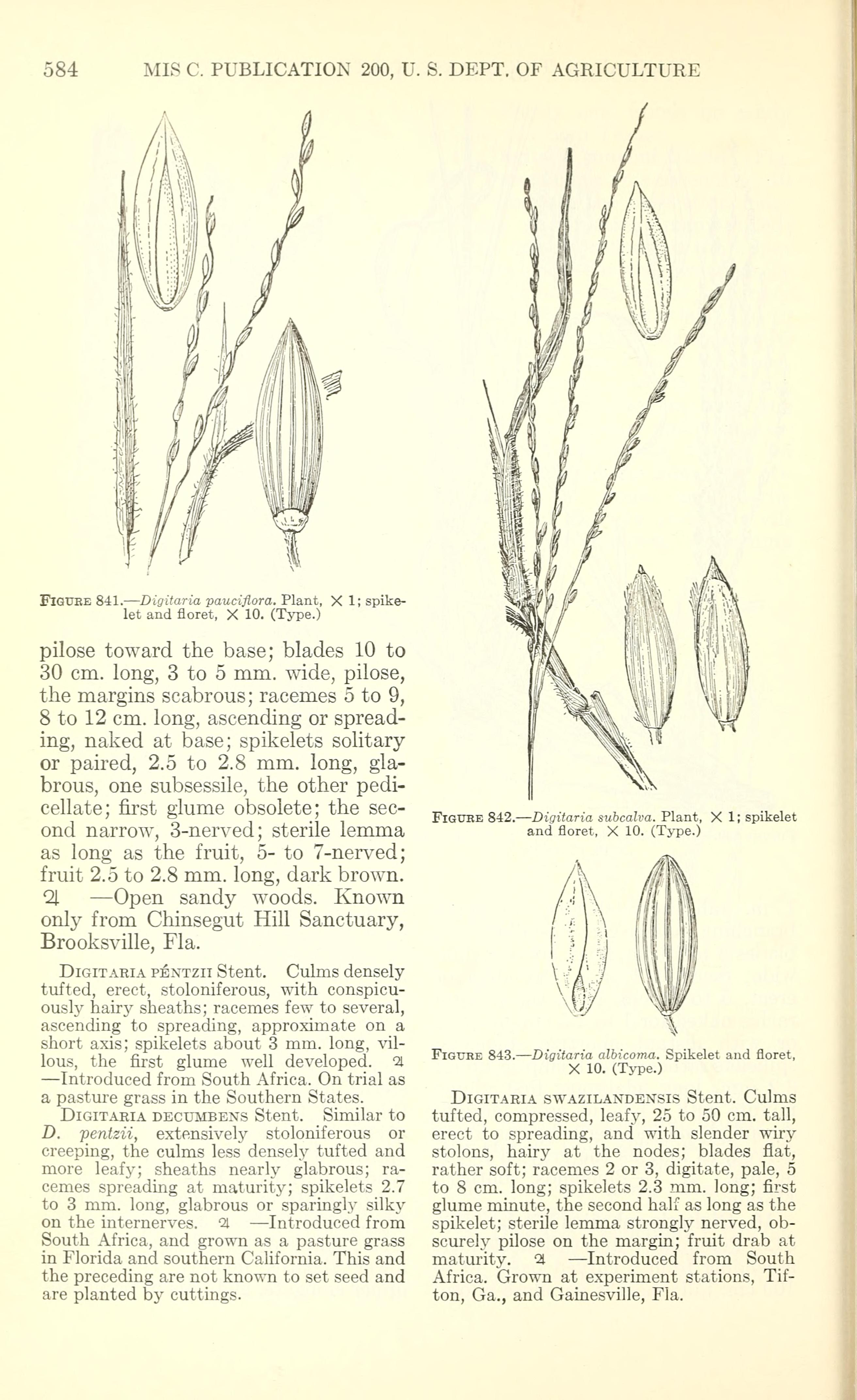
- Digitaria pauciflora

Conservation status
- Critically Imperiled (NatureServe)

Scientific classification
- Kingdom: Plantae
- Clade: Tracheophytes
- Clade: Angiosperms
- Clade: Monocots
- Clade: Commelinids
- Order: Poales
- Family: Poaceae
- Subfamily: Panicoideae
- Genus: Digitaria
- Species: D. pauciflora

Binomial name
- Digitaria pauciflora Hitchc.

= Digitaria pauciflora =

Species of flowering plant

Digitaria pauciflora is a species of grass known by the common names twospike crabgrass, Florida pineland crabgrass, Everglades grass, few-flowered fingergrass, and particular grass. It is endemic to Florida in the United States, where it is found only in the Everglades.

This perennial grass grows up to a meter tall, growing in clumps up to a meter wide. The densely hairy leaves are up to 12 centimeters long. The inflorescence is a panicle with 2 or 3 branches up to 11 centimeters long.

The specific epithet pauciflora, referring the Latin term for 'few flowered'.

Today this plant only occurs in Everglades National Park in rocky pinelands habitat and prairie. This type of habitat can flood during the wet season. It is also prone to wildfire. Associated plants include Pinus elliottii var. densa, Sabal palmetto, Schizachyrium rhizomatum, Vernonia blodgettii, and Elytraria caroliniensis var. angustifolia.

The total distribution is about 31 square miles. It is represented by a single population. While the population is largely protected within the Everglades, the surrounding landscape is undergoing rapid development. Within the park the species may be affected by changes in the local hydrology and the fire regime and the invasion of non-native plants.
