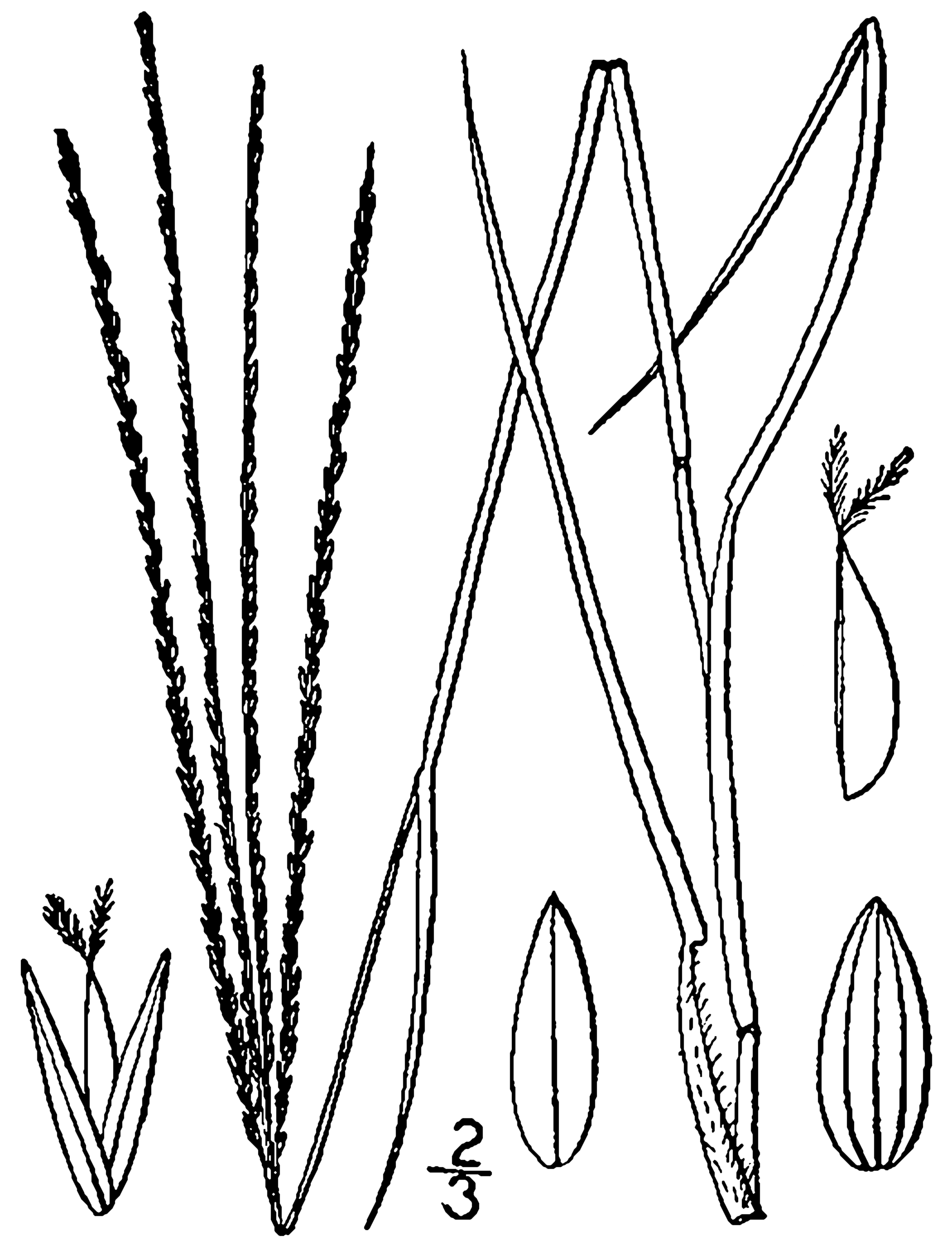

Scientific classification
- Kingdom: Plantae
- Clade: Tracheophytes
- Clade: Angiosperms
- Clade: Monocots
- Clade: Commelinids
- Order: Poales
- Family: Poaceae
- Subfamily: Panicoideae
- Genus: Digitaria
- Species: D. filiformis

Binomial name
- Digitaria filiformis (L.) Koeler

= Digitaria filiformis =

Species of plant

Digitaria filiformis, commonly known as slender crabgrass, is a tufted annual grass in the family Poaceae native to North America.

== Description ==
Slender crabgrass is known for its slender, upright stems reaching 30–120 cm in height. The leaves are narrow (2–4 mm wide) and up to 15 cm long, typically rough and hairy above, with smooth or sparsely hairy undersides; the sheaths are also hairy. Ligules are short (0.5–1 mm), membranous, and often jagged or torn. The plant produces 2–7 ascending racemes, each 3–12 cm long, with a rough, triangular rachis. Spikelets are small (1.8–2.5 mm), with hairy second glumes and ciliate sterile lemmas; the fertile lemma and palea are smooth, purplish, and lined with tiny papillae. Grains are ellipsoid, whitish to brownish, and measure about 1–1.2 mm long. Like other species in the genus, D. filiformis can be a persistent weed in disturbed soils.

== Distribution and habitat ==
Slender crabgrass is widely distributed in eastern North America. It grows in longleaf pine sandhills, pine flatwoods, fields, roadsides, and disturbed areas.

There are three varieties: D. filiformis var. laeviglumis; D. filiformis var. filiformis; and D. filiformis var. dolichophylla. D. filiformis var. laeviglumis is rare and endemic to New Hampshire in peaty depressions on granite ledges.
