= Digitaria californica =

Conservation status
- Secure (NatureServe)

Scientific classification
- Kingdom: Plantae
- Clade: Tracheophytes
- Clade: Angiosperms
- Clade: Monocots
- Clade: Commelinids
- Order: Poales
- Family: Poaceae
- Subfamily: Panicoideae
- Genus: Digitaria
- Species: D. californica

Binomial name
- Digitaria californica (Benth.) Henr.

Synonyms
- List: Eriachne rigida Phil.; Panicum californicum Benth.; Panicum friesii Hack. ex R.E.Fr.; Panicum lachnanthum Torr. nom. illeg.; Panicum saccharatum Buckley; Trichachne californica (Benth.) Chase ex Hitchc.; Trichachne saccharata (Buckley) Nash; Tricholaena saccharata (Buckley) Griseb.; Valota saccharata (Buckley) Chase

Species of flowering plant

Digitaria californica is a species of grass known by the common name Arizona cottontop. It is native to the Americas, where it can be found in the southwestern United States, Mexico, Central America, and South America.

This perennial grass forms a clump of stems reaching up to a meter in height. The branching root system can reach one meter deep. There are no rhizomes or stolons. The leaf sheaths around the stems can be very hairy to woolly. The leaves are usually short and narrow. The inflorescence is a dense, narrow panicle containing pairs of woolly-haired spikelets.

This plant grows in a number of habitat types, including desert scrub and shrublands, shrubsteppe, and savanna. In the desert it sometimes grows beneath mesquites where it thrives in the local nutrients. It tolerates varying precipitation amounts and survives easily in drought conditions, becoming dormant at times, then growing quickly when rain returns. Much of its growth occurs in the summer, after the spring and summer rain cycles.

This species is a preferred grass for livestock such as cattle. It tolerates high grazing activity, but not overgrazing.
