= Digitaria compacta =

Scientific classification
- Kingdom: Plantae
- Clade: Tracheophytes
- Clade: Angiosperms
- Clade: Monocots
- Clade: Commelinids
- Order: Poales
- Family: Poaceae
- Subfamily: Panicoideae
- Genus: Digitaria
- Species: D. compacta

Binomial name
- Digitaria compacta (Roth ex Roem. & Schult.) Veldkamp

Synonyms
- Axonopus corymbosus (Roxb.) Schult.; Digitaria bifasciculata (Trin.) Henrard; Digitaria corymbosa (Roxb.) Merr.; Digitaria cruciata var. esculenta Bor; Digitaria fascicularis Link nom. illeg.; Digitaria villosa Trin. nom. inval.; Panicum bifasciculatum Trin.; Panicum corymbosum Roxb.; Panicum fasciculare (Link) Trin. nom. illeg.; Panicum fasciculatum Trin. nom. inval.; Panicum imperfectum Roxb. ex Kunth nom. inval.; Panicum schraderi Kunth nom. illeg.; Paspalum compactum Roth; Paspalum corymbosum (Roxb.) Kunth; Paspalum porrigens Arn. ex Hook.f. nom. inval.; Reimaria fascicularis (Link) Link nom. illeg.; Syntherisma corymbosa (Roxb.) Hosok.; Syntherisma corymbosum (Roxb.) Sasaki

Species of grass also known as raishan

Digitaria compacta is a grass species native to India and Indochina.

It is cultivated in the Khasi Hills of northeast India, used as a glutinous flour for making bread or porridge, and known as raishan. It is cultivated in maize fields by sowing in April-May and harvesting the grain in September-October; the straw is harvested later after the other crops in the field have been harvested. It is often cooked like rice or even with rice (1 part raishan to two parts rice). The straw is used for winter fodder for cattle.

== See also ==
- Digitaria exilis, white fonio, used as a grain crop in West Africa
- Digitaria iburua, black fonio, used as a grain crop in West Africa
- Digitaria sanguinalis, considered a weed around the world, but traditionally used as a grain crop in Europe
