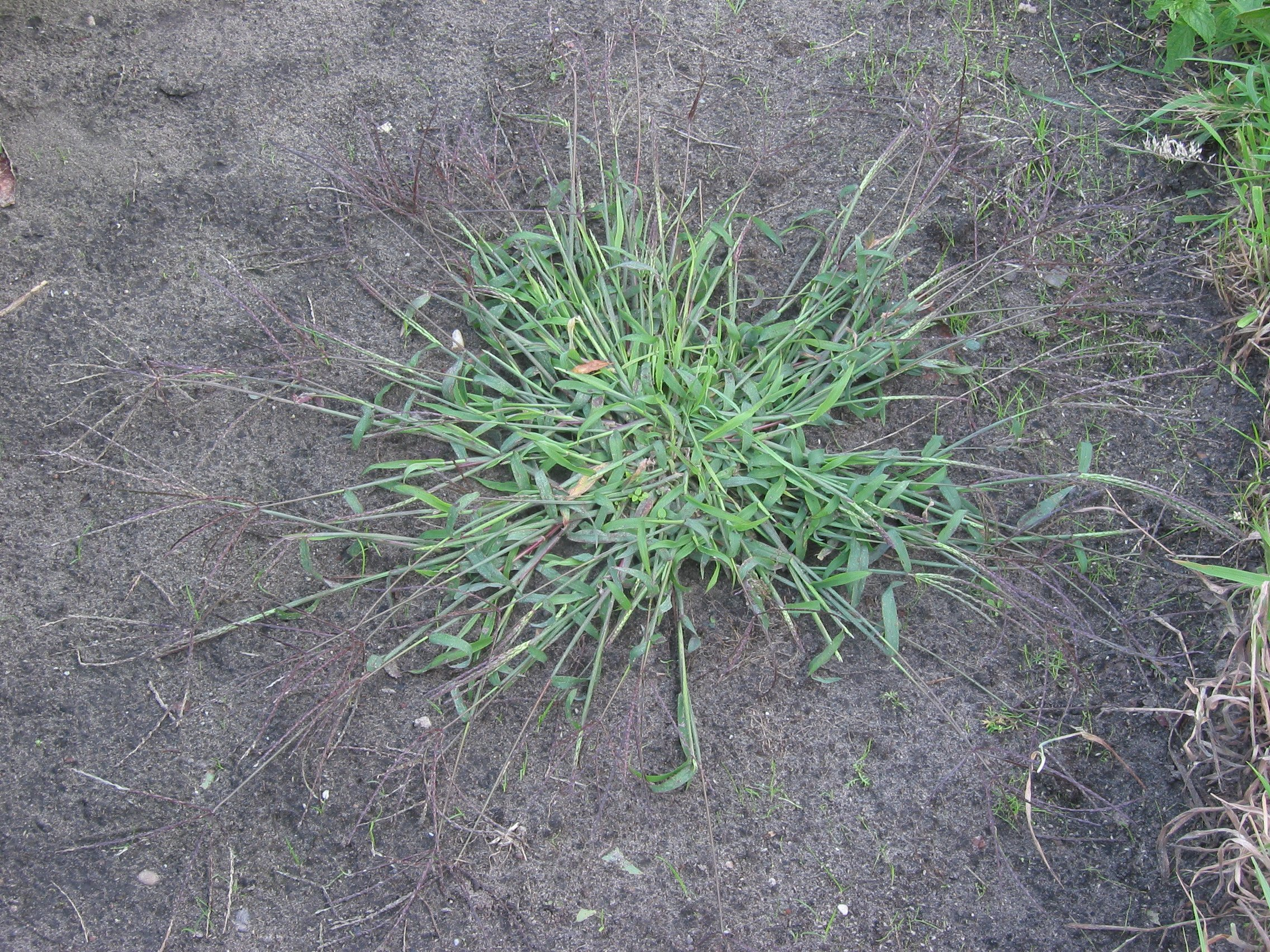

Scientific classification
- Kingdom: Plantae
- Clade: Tracheophytes
- Clade: Angiosperms
- Clade: Monocots
- Clade: Commelinids
- Order: Poales
- Family: Poaceae
- Subfamily: Panicoideae
- Genus: Digitaria
- Species: D. sanguinalis

Binomial name
- Digitaria sanguinalis (L.) Scop.

Synonyms
- List: * Asperella digitaria Lam.; * Cynodon praecox (Walter) Roem. & Schult.; * Dactilon sanguinale (L.) Vill.; * Digitaria aegyptiaca Willd.; * Digitaria australis Willd. ex Trin. *nom. inval.; * Digitaria caucasica Henrard; * Digitaria eriogona (Schrad.) Link; * Digitaria gracilis Guss.; * Digitaria intermedia Gennari; * Digitaria nealleyi Henrard; * Digitaria nervosa (Rottb.) Roem. & Schult.; * Digitaria panicea Willd. ex Steud. nom. inval.; * Digitaria pectiniformis (Henrard) Tzvelev; * Digitaria pilosa Pieri nom. illeg.; * Digitaria plebeia Phil.; * Digitaria praecox (Walter) Willd.; * Digitaria sabulosa Tzvelev; * Digitaria sanguinaria Steud. nom. inval.; * Digitaria sanguinea Weber [Spelling variant]; * Digitaria sanguinolenta Edgew. ex Aitch. nom. inval.; * Digitaria sienitica Trin. nom. inval.; * Digitaria stricta Willd. ex Steud. nom. inval.; * Digitaria tristachya Willd. ex Steud. nom. inval.; * Digitaria vulgaris (Schrad.) Besser; * Leptochloa fascicularis Griseb. ex Benth. nom. inval.; * Milium membranaceum Moench; * Panicum aegyptiacum Retz. nom. illeg.; * Panicum aegyptium J.F.Gmel. [Spelling variant]; * Panicum ambiguum Lapeyr. nom. inval.; * Panicum eriogonum Schrad.; * Panicum fallax Spreng.; * Panicum gracile (Guss.) Nyman nom. illeg.; * Panicum gussonii K.Richt.; * Panicum nervosum Rottler nom. illeg.; * Panicum rottleri Kunth; * Panicum sanguinale L.; * Panicum sanguineum Gueldenst.; * Panicum sanguinolentum Edgew. ex Aitch. nom. inval.; * Panicum trichostachyum Steud. nom. inval.; * Paspalum aegyptiacum (Willd.) Poir.; * Paspalum filiforme Steud. nom. inval.; * Paspalum oxyanthum Steud.; * Paspalum sanguinale (L.) Lam.; * Sanguinaria nevenarae Bubani; * Syntherisma praecox Walter; * Syntherisma sanguinale (L.) Dulac; * Syntherisma sanguinalis (L.) Dulac; * Syntherisma vulgaris Schrad.

= Digitaria sanguinalis =

Species of grass sometimes used as a crop

Digitaria sanguinalis is a species of grass known by several common names, including hairy crabgrass, hairy finger-grass, large crabgrass, crab finger grass, purple crabgrass. It is one of the better-known species of the genus Digitaria, and one that is known nearly worldwide as a common weed. It is used as animal fodder, and the seeds are edible and have been used as a grain in Germany and especially Poland, where it is sometimes cultivated. This has earned it the name Polish millet.

== Description ==
It is an annual grass with an inflorescence of up to nine very long, very thin, radiating branches atop its stems. Each branch is lined with pairs of very tiny spikelets. The inflorescences may be reddish or purplish.

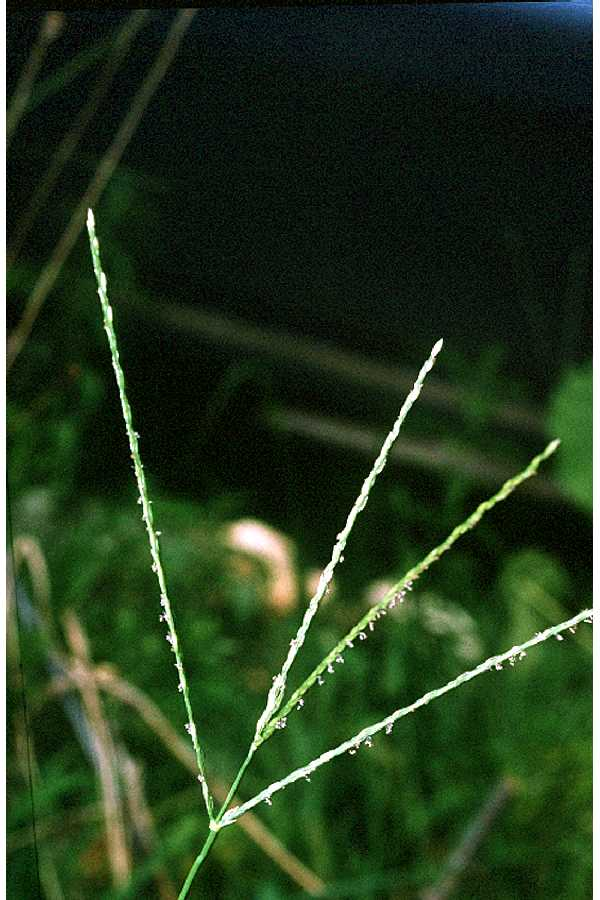

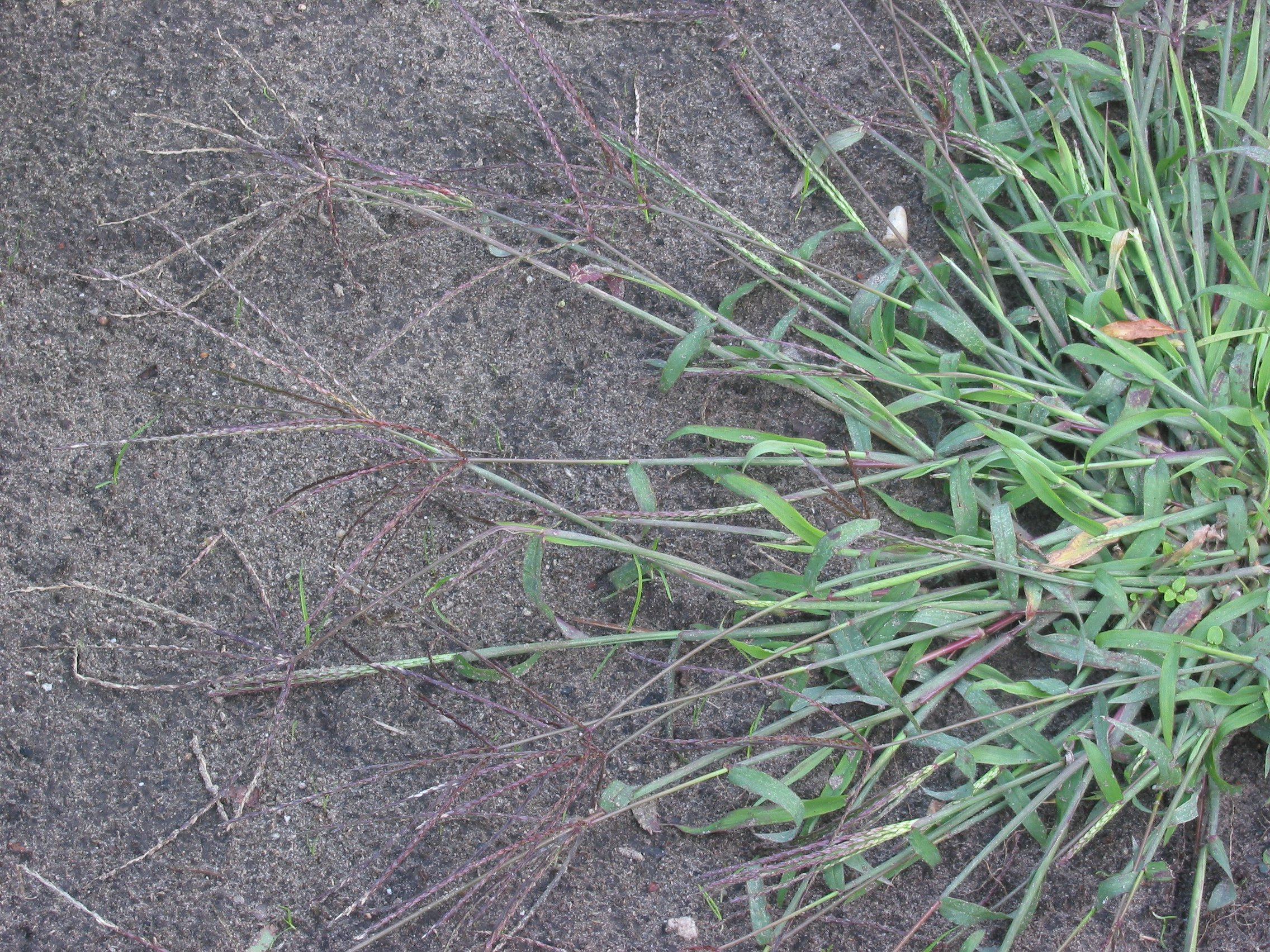

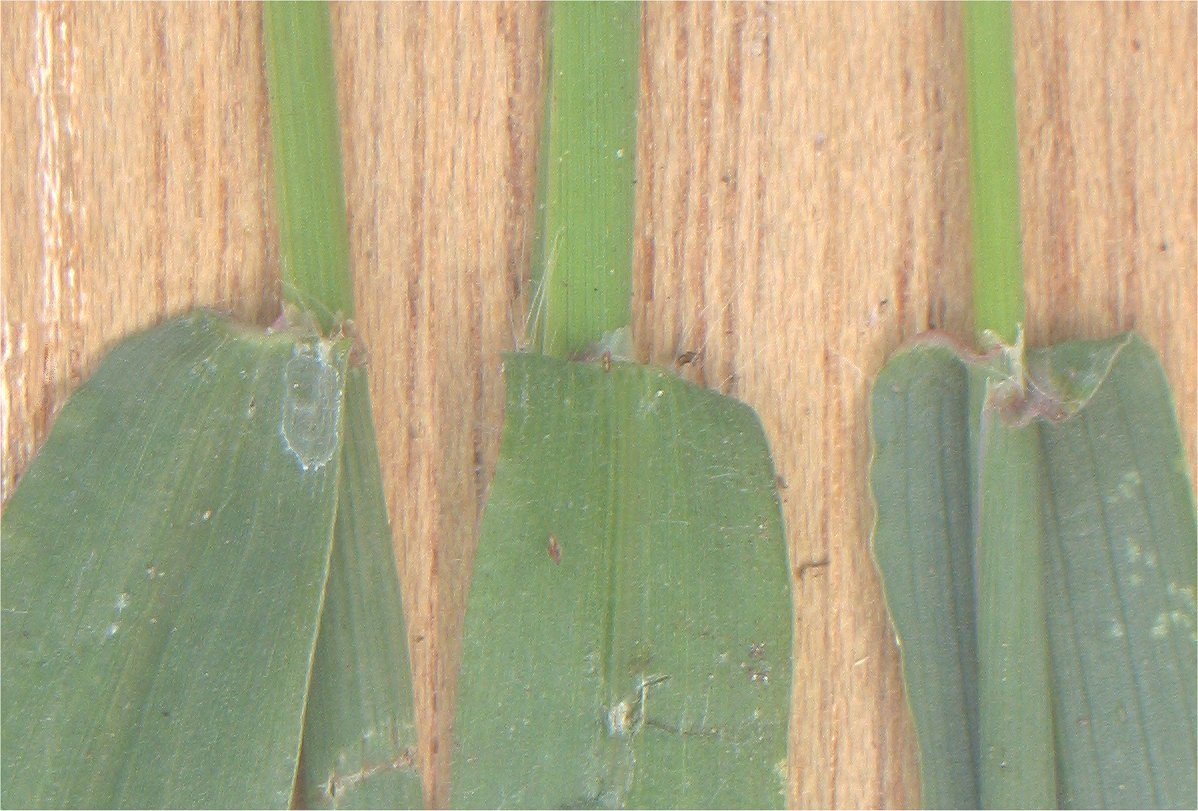

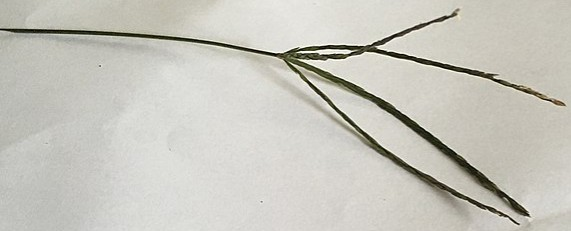

== Uses ==
During the European Middle Ages, Digitaria sanguinalis was cultivated by Slavic peoples in Eastern Europe, where it was cooked in soups and porridges.

The plant was brought to the United States by immigrants to serve as hand-foraged grain. The grass is also highly nutritious, especially before the plant exhausts itself producing seed. It is frequently sown in fields to provide graze for animals, or clipped and bundled as hay. Compared to other grasses, it has a relatively high protein percentage. Farmers will sometimes till patches in their pastures in the late spring, with the intent of encouraging crabgrass seed.

For human consumption, crabgrass necessarily must be harvested by hand, because it produces grain throughout summer, rather than simultaneously. Machine harvesting would require monthly passes, and even then much of the seed would go to waste. Crabgrass produces an exceptionally high amount of grain, it smothers other weeds, it acts as its own mulch, and it can survive both heat and drought. Its adaptability makes it a candidate for environmental small-farming.

== Control ==
Its usefulness to nineteenth-century homesteaders has made its seed widespread, and today is generally considered an unattractive nuisance. Crabgrass takes advantage of low fertility and drought, since this tends to weaken other grasses and it tends to invade manicured turf. It is difficult to kill, as it will regenerate, and chemicals will likely harm surrounding grasses. As an annual, it can be controlled by preemergent herbicides. The most efficient means of control is to pull patches, and keep the rest of the lawn watered and mowed at a height of two to three inches.

== See also ==
- Digitaria compacta, raishan, used as a grain crop in northeast India
- Digitaria exilis, white fonio, used as a crop in West Africa
- Digitaria iburua, black fonio, used as a crop in West Africa
