= Digitaria platycarpha =

Scientific classification
- Kingdom: Plantae
- Clade: Embryophytes
- Clade: Tracheophytes
- Clade: Spermatophytes
- Clade: Angiosperms
- Clade: Monocots
- Clade: Commelinids
- Order: Poales
- Family: Poaceae
- Subfamily: Panicoideae
- Genus: Digitaria
- Species: D. platycarpha

Binomial name
- Digitaria platycarpha (Trin.) Stapf

Species of grass

Digitaria platycarpha is a species of flowering plant in the family Poaceae (grasses), native to the Bonin Islands and the Volcano Islands, both belonging to Japan.
