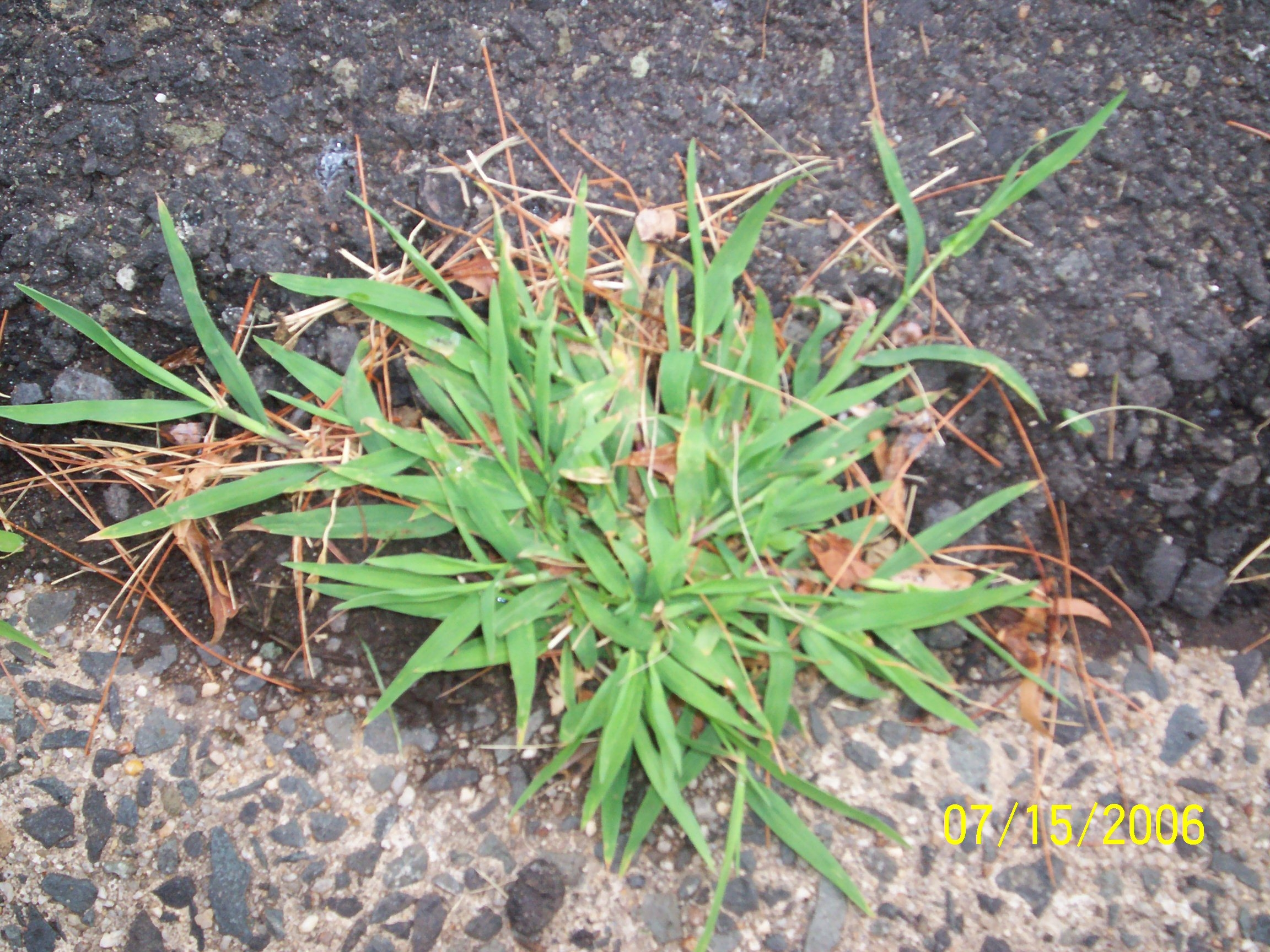
- Digitaria sanguinalis

Scientific classification
- Kingdom: Plantae
- Clade: Tracheophytes
- Clade: Angiosperms
- Clade: Monocots
- Clade: Commelinids
- Order: Poales
- Family: Poaceae
- Subfamily: Panicoideae
- Supertribe: Panicodae
- Tribe: Paniceae
- Subtribe: Anthephorinae
- Genus: Digitaria; Haller 1768, conserved name not Heist. ex Fabr. 1759 nor Scop. 1772 nor Adans. 1763

Synonyms
- Digitaria Heist. ex Fabr. 1759, rejected name not Haller 1768; Valota Adans. 1763, rejected name not Dumort. 1829; Sanguinella Gleichen; Syntherisma Walter; Acicarpa Raddi; Trichachne Nees; Gramerium Desv.; Elytroblepharum (Steud.) Schltdl.; Eriachne Phil. 1870, illegitimate homonym not R.Br. 1810; Sanguinaria Bubani; Leptoloma Chase; Digitariopsis C.E.Hubb.; Digitariella De Winter; Panicum sect. Digitaria (Haller) Trin.; Panicum ser. Digitaria (Haller) Benth.; Panicum ser. Digitarieae (Haller) Benth.; Panicum subg. Digitaria (Haller) A. Gray; Panicum subg. Digitaria (Haller) Hack.; Paspalum sect. Digitaria (Haller) Nees; Paspalum subg. Digitaria (Haller) A. Camus

= Digitaria =

Genus of plants (grasses; crabgrass)

Digitaria is a genus of plants in the grass family native to tropical and warm temperate regions but can occur in tropical, subtropical, and cooler temperate regions as well. Common names include crabgrass, finger-grass, and fonio. They are slender monocotyledonous annual and perennial lawn, pasture, and forage plants; some are often considered lawn pests. Digitus is the Latin word for "finger", and they are distinguished by the long, finger-like inflorescences they produce.

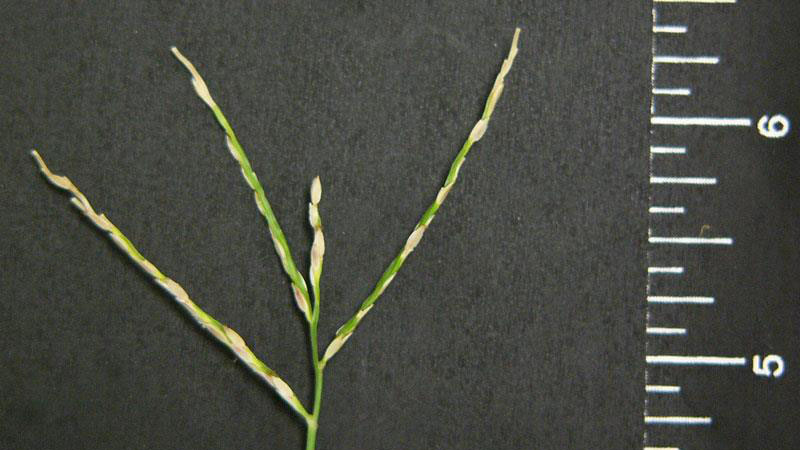
Large crabgrass seedhead raceme

== Uses ==
The seeds are edible, most notably those of fonio (Digitaria exilis and Digitaria iburua), Digitaria sanguinalis, as well as Digitaria compacta. They can be toasted, ground into a flour, made into porridge or fermented to make beer. Fonio has been widely used as a staple crop in parts of Africa. It also has decent nutrient qualities as a forage for cattle.

== Lawns ==
The prevalent species of Digitaria in North America are large crabgrass (D. sanguinalis), sometimes known as hairy crabgrass; and smooth crabgrass (D. ischaemum). These species often become problem weeds in lawns and gardens, growing especially well in thin lawns that are watered lightly, under-fertilized, and poorly drained. They are annual plants, and one plant is capable of producing 150,000 seeds per season. The seeds germinate in the late spring and early summer and outcompete the domesticated lawn grasses, expanding outward in a circle up to 30 cm (12 in) in diameter. In the autumn when the plants die, they leave large voids in the lawn. The voids then become prime areas for the crabgrass seeds to germinate the following season.

Biological control is preferable over herbicide use on lawns, as crabgrass emergence is not the cause of poor lawn health but a symptom, and it will return annually if the lawn is not restored with fertilization and proper watering. Crabgrass is quickly outcompeted by healthy lawn grass because, as an annual plant, crabgrass dies off in autumn and needs open conditions for its germination the following spring.

== Selected species ==
- Digitaria ammophila (Benth.) Hughes – silky umbrella grass
- Digitaria bicornis (Lam.) Roemer & J.A.Schultes ex Loud. – Asian crabgrass
- Digitaria brownii (Roem. & Schult.) Hughes – cotton panic grass
- Digitaria californica (Benth.) Henrard – Arizona cottontop
- Digitaria ciliaris (Retz.) Koeler – summer grass, southern crabgrass
- Digitaria cognata (Schult.) Pilg. – fall witchgrass, Carolina crabgrass, mountain hairgrass
- Digitaria compacta (Roth ex Roem. & Schult.) Veldkamp
- Digitaria cruciata (Nees) A. Camus
- Digitaria ctenantha (F.Muell.) Hughes – comb finger grass
- Digitaria didactyla Willd. – Queensland blue couch
- Digitaria divaricatissima var. macractinia (Benth.) Heather L.Stewart & N.G.Walsh
- Digitaria eriantha Steud. – pangolagrass, Smuts finger grass, woolly finger grass
- Digitaria exilis (Kippist) Stapf – white fonio
- Digitaria filiformis (L.) Koeler – slender crabgrass
- Digitaria gracillima (Scribn.) Fernald – longleaf crabgrass
- Digitaria horizontalis Willd. – Jamaican crabgrass
- Digitaria iburua Stapf – Black fonio
- Digitaria insularis (L.) Fedde – sourgrass
- Digitaria ischaemum (Schreb.) Schreb. ex Muhl. – smooth crabgrass, small crabgrass, smooth finger grass
- Digitaria longiflora (Retz.) Pers. – Indian crabgrass
- Digitaria milanjiana (Rendle) Stapf – Madagascar crabgrass
- Digitaria nuda Schumacher – naked crabgrass
- Digitaria pauciflora Hitchc. – twospike crabgrass
- Digitaria platycarpha (Trin.) Stapf
- Digitaria petelotii Henrard
- Digitaria radicosa (C.Presl) Miq. – trailing crabgrass
- Digitaria sanguinalis (L.) Scop. – hairy crabgrass, large crabgrass
- Digitaria seriata Stapf – Sandveld fingergrass
- Digitaria setigera Roth ex Roemer & J.A.Schultes – East Indian crabgrass
- Digitaria serotina (Walt.) Michx. – dwarf crabgrass
- Digitaria stenotaphrodes (Nees ex Steud.) Stapf
- Digitaria texana A.S.Hitchc. – Texas crabgrass
- Digitaria velutina (Forssk.) P.Beauv – velvet crabgrass
- Digitaria villosa (Walt.) Pers. – shaggy crabgrass
- Digitaria violascens Link – violet crabgrass
