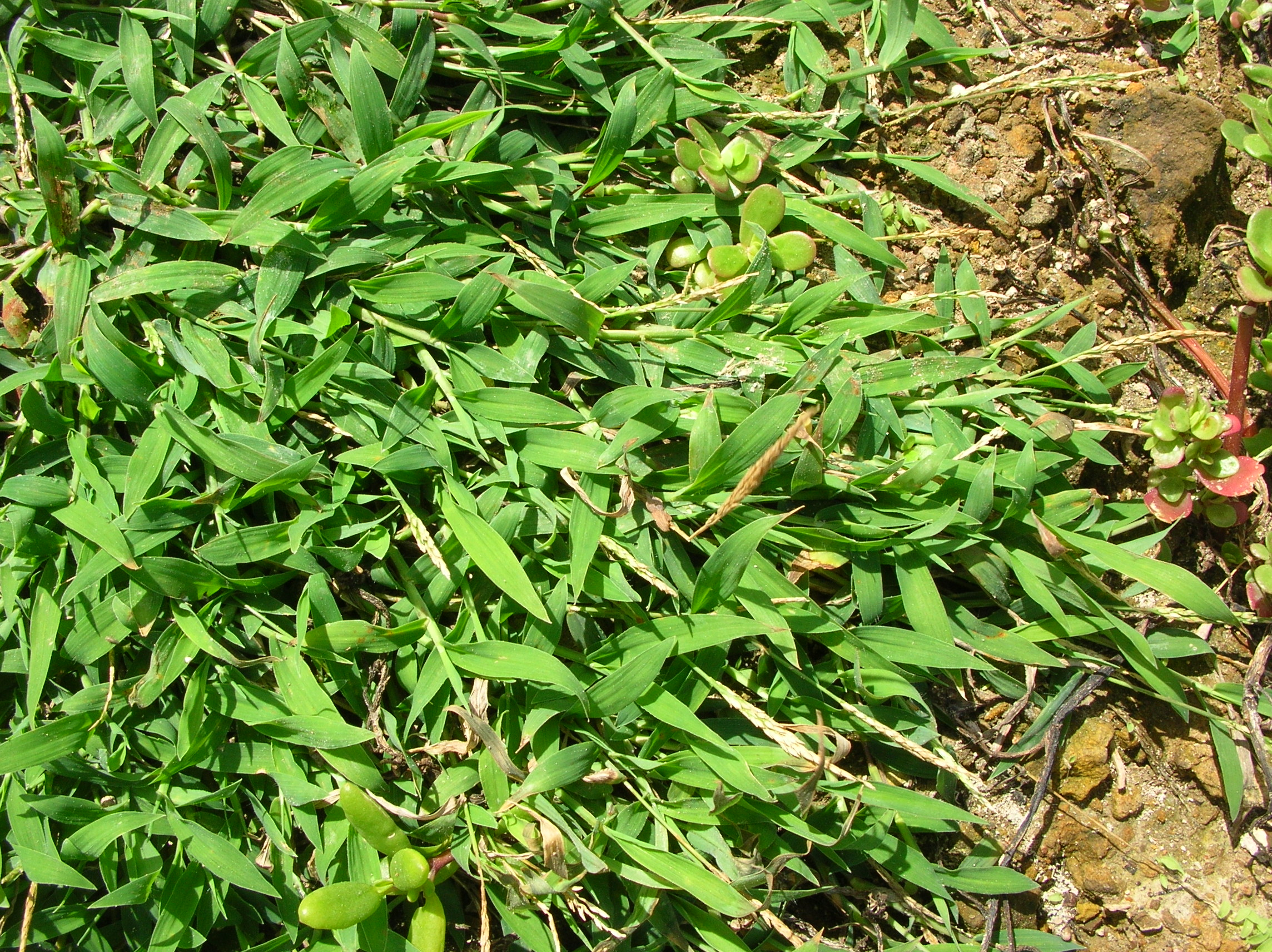

Conservation status
- Secure (NatureServe)

Scientific classification
- Kingdom: Plantae
- Clade: Tracheophytes
- Clade: Angiosperms
- Clade: Monocots
- Clade: Commelinids
- Order: Poales
- Family: Poaceae
- Subfamily: Panicoideae
- Genus: Digitaria
- Species: D. ciliaris

Binomial name
- Digitaria ciliaris (Retz.) Koeler

Synonyms
- Asprella digitata Lam.; Digitaria abortiva Reeder; Digitaria adscendens (Kunth) Henrard; Digitaria brevifolia Link; Digitaria chinensis Hornem.; Digitaria chrysoblephara Fig. & De Not.; Digitaria fimbriata Link; Digitaria inaequale (Link) Spreng.; Digitaria inaequalis (Link) Spreng.; Digitaria marginata Link; Digitaria pes-avis Buse; Digitaria sericea (Honda) Ohwi; Digitaria tarapacana Phil.; Leersia digitata (Lam.) Poir.; Milium ciliare (Retz.) Moench; Milium ciliatum Moench nom. illeg.; Panicum adscendens Kunth; Panicum brachyphyllum Steud.; Panicum brevifolium (Link) Kunth nom. illeg.; Panicum ciliare Retz.; Panicum fimbriatum (Link) Kunth; Panicum inaequale (Link) E.Fourn. nom. illeg.; Panicum linkianum Kunth; Panicum marginellum Schrad. nom. illeg.; Panicum ornithopus Trin.; Panicum pes-avis (Buse) Koord.; Panicum villiferum Nees; Paspalum ciliare (Retz.) DC.; Paspalum inaequale Link; Sanguinaria ciliaris (Retz.) Bubani; Spartina pubera Hassk. nom. inval.; Syntherisma ciliare (Retz.) Schrad.; Syntherisma ciliaris (Retz.) Schrad.; Syntherisma fimbriata (Link) Nash; Syntherisma marginata (Link) Nash; Syntherisma sericea Honda

= Digitaria ciliaris =

Species of grass

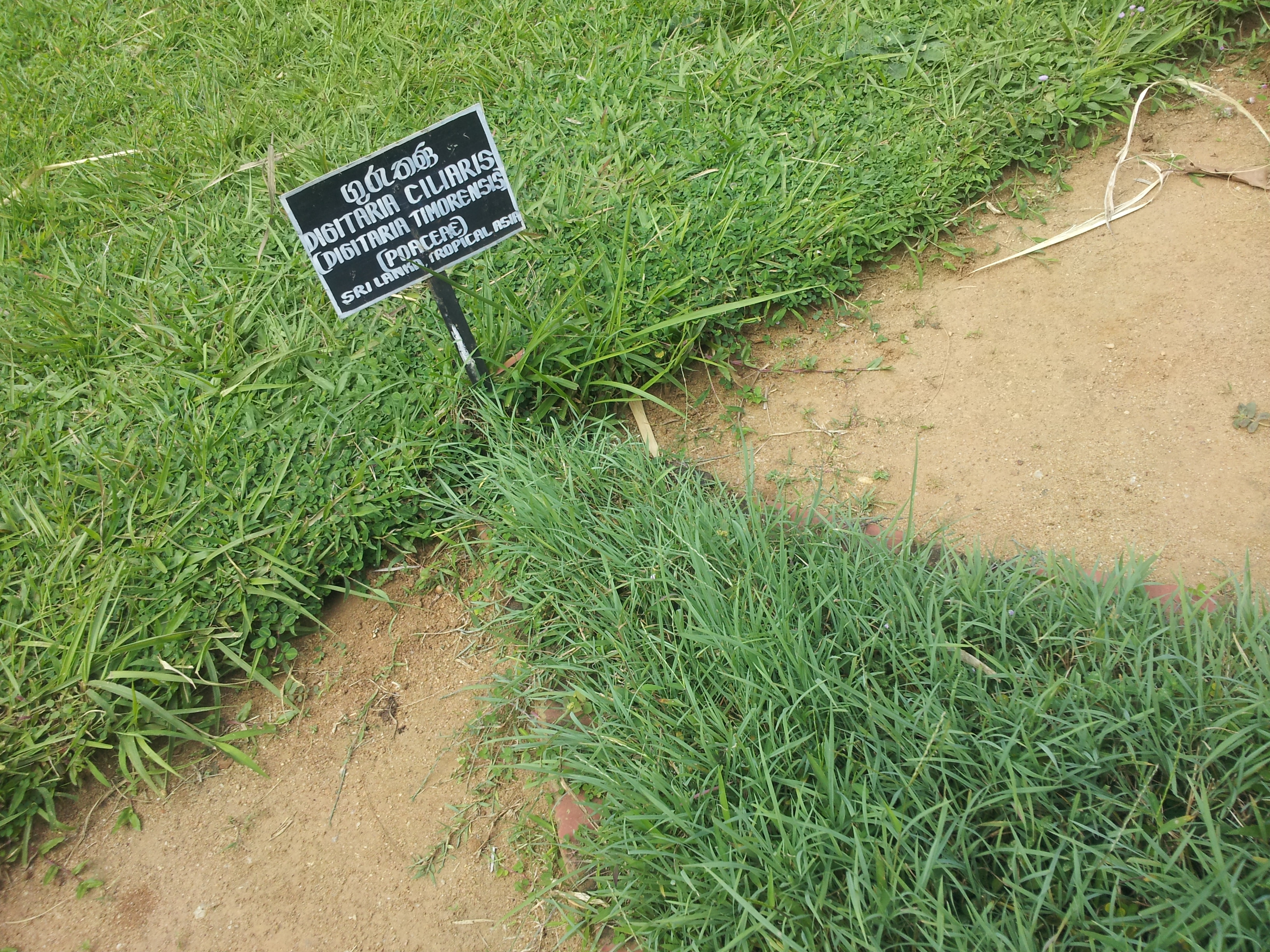
At Peradeniya Royal Botanical Garden.

Digitaria ciliaris is a species of grass known by the common names southern crabgrass, tropical finger-grass, tropical crabgrass or summer grass.

The grass is known as "ගුරු තණ - guru thana" in Sri Lanka.

== Distribution and habitat ==
Digitaria ciliaris is a tough plant, believed to have originated in Asia but now found all over the tropical belt of the planet, as well as in many temperate regions of both hemispheres. This grass is an invasive species considered an aggressive weed in certain countries, including China, Mexico and the United States.

This species has been observed growing in habitats such as coastal dunes, tidal marshes, and saw palmetto flats.

Together with Portulaca oleracea, Ipomoea pes-caprae and Wollastonia biflora, Digitaria ciliaris is usually one of the first species colonizing degraded or altered environments in tropical zones of the planet.

== Description ==
This grass is an annual plant that can grow up to 1 m tall but is usually much shorter. The roots are at the nodes and the stems produce runners that allow the plant to grow fast forming scruffy-looking patches about 1 m across and half a metre in height. The leaves are linear to linear-ovate narrowing at the tip to 15 centimeters long. The inflorescence is at the top of a long stem, usually much taller than the leaves, with two to nine 5–10 cm long sub-digitate racemes.

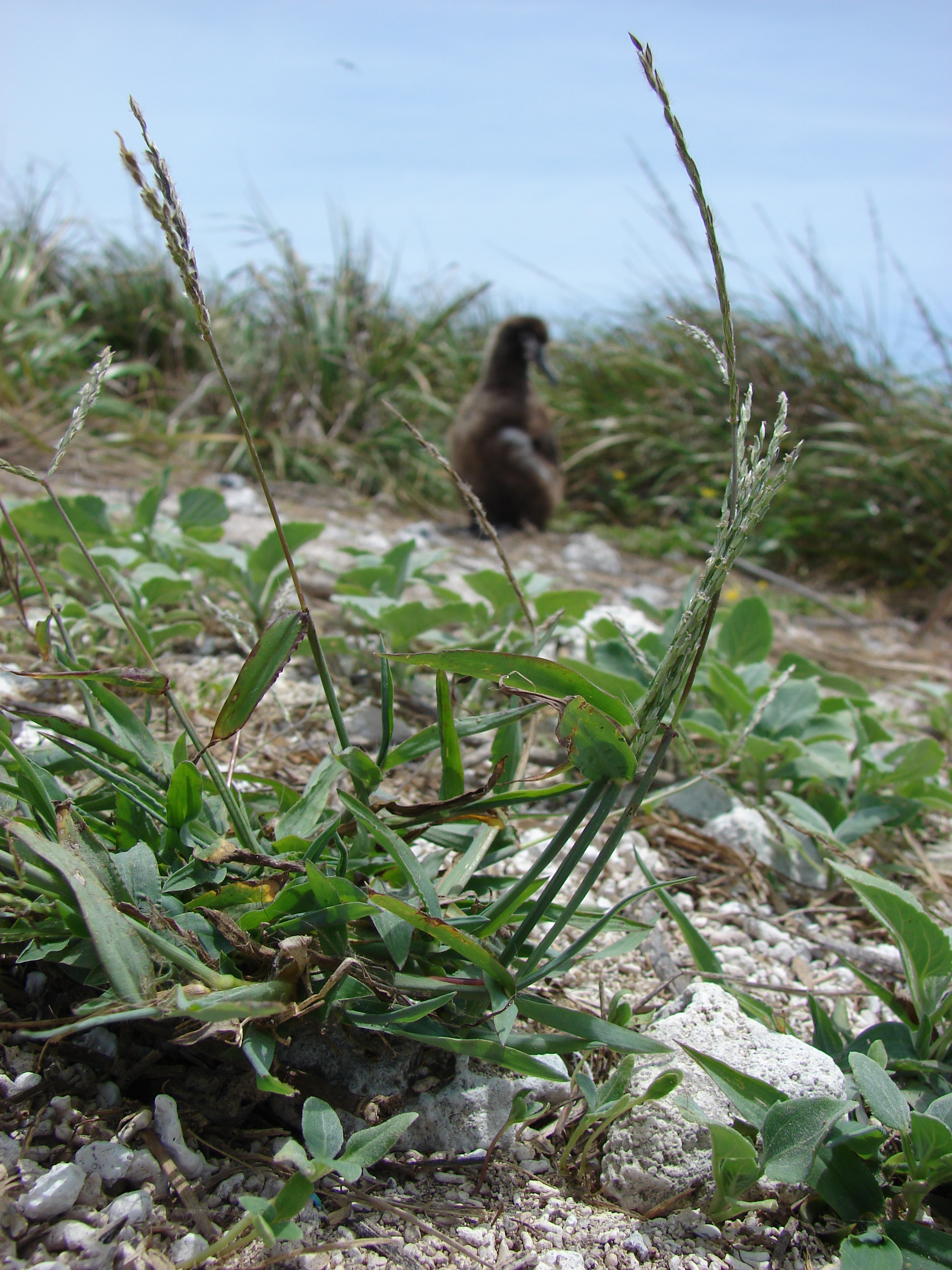
General appearance of the grass.

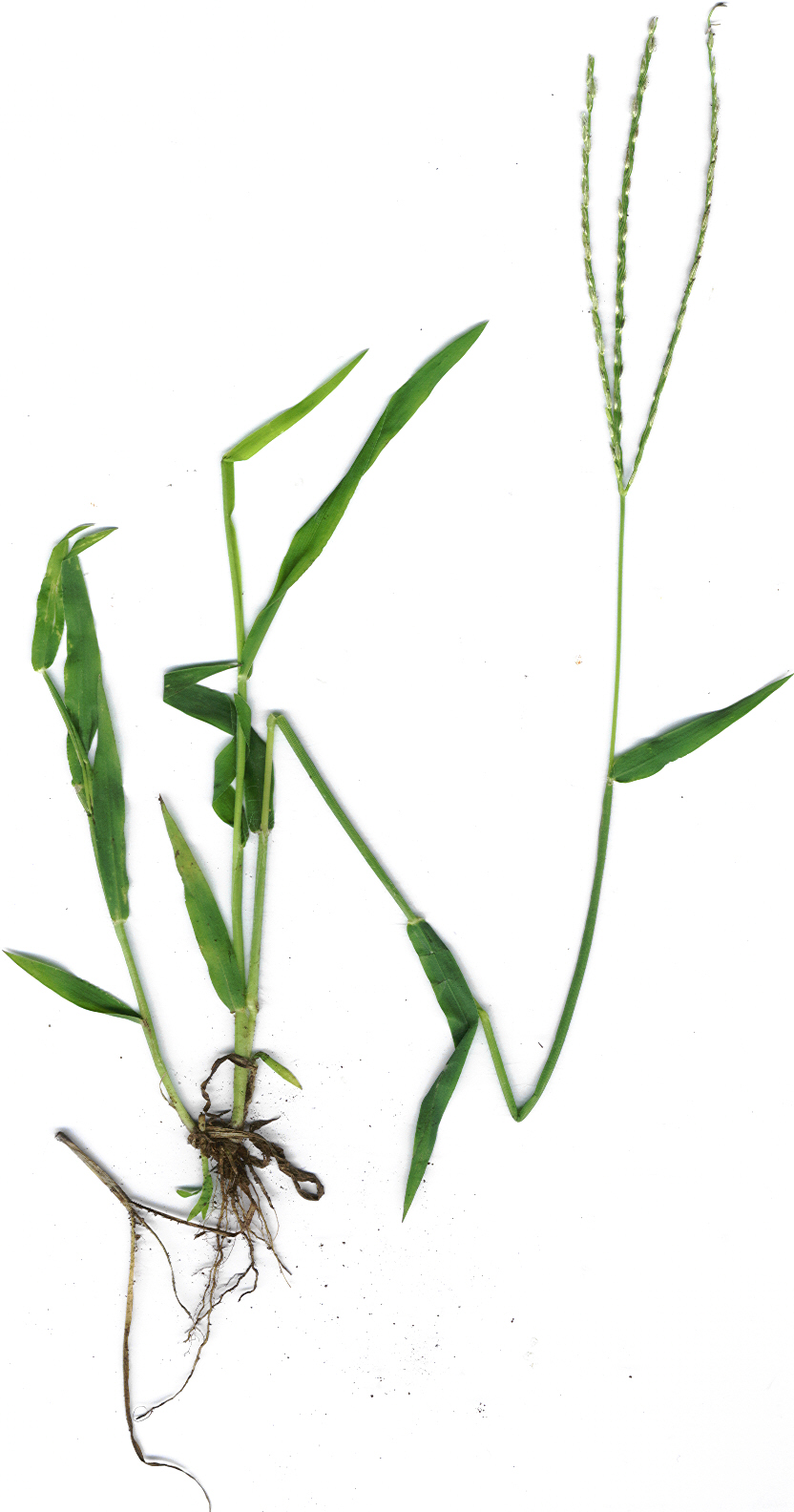
Plant and roots.

== Forage Crop ==
Southern crabgrass, and the related large crabgrass, especially the cultivars 'Red River Crabgrass', 'Impact', and 'Quick-n-Big', have been utilized as a forage crop for livestock, as it is a highly nutritious warm season grass. Red river crabgrass responds well to nitrogen fertilizer, growing up to 3 feet tall, and needs to be in rotation with cool-season forage.
