= Ba (surname) =

Ba, Bâ, and Bah are potentially related West African surnames, usually of Fula origin. In the Fula culture of Guinea, Mali, and Senegal, the surname Diakité is considered equivalent.

Ba is also a family name in modern China.

== Ba ==
- Adame Ba Konaré (born 1947), a Malian Historian and former first lady
- Amadou Ba (disambiguation), several people
- Amadou Dia Ba (born 1958), a Senegalese athlete
- Demba Ba (born 1985), a Senegalese footballer
- Georges Ba (born 1979), an Ivorian footballer
- Ibrahim Ba (born 1973), a French footballer
- Ibrahima Ba (footballer born 1984), a Senegalese footballer
- Inday Ba (1972–2005), a Swedish–British actress
- Ismail Ba (born 1974), a Senegalese footballer
- Issa Ba (born 1981), a Senegalese footballer
- Papa Malick Ba (born 1980), a Senegalese footballer
- Pape Samba Ba (born 1982), a Senegalese footballer
- Sadio Ba (born 1973), a Belgian footballer
- Teresa Nzola Meso Ba (born 1983), an Angolan–French triple jumper

== Bâ ==
- Alioune Bâ (born 1959), a Malian photographer
- Koli Tenguella Bâ (born 14**), founder of the great Denyankés dynasty that ruled over 3 centuries in between Senegal, Mali, Guinea and Mauritania
- Alioune Bâ (born 19**), a Senegalese political leader
- Amadou Bâ (disambiguation), several people
- Amadou Hampâté Bâ (c. 1901 – 1991), a Malian writer and ethnologist
- Maba Diakhou Bâ (1809–1867), a Senegalese Muslim and religious leader
- Mariama Bâ (1929–1981), a Senegalese author and feminist
- Youssouf Sambo Bâ (born 1942), a Burkinabé politician and former teacher

== Bah ==
- Abdallah Bah (born 1975), Guinean footballer
- Abu Bakar Bah (born 1978), Sierra Leonean footballer
- Aïcha Bah Diallo, Guinean politician and activist
- Alexander Bah (born 1997), Danish footballer
- Algassime Bah (born 2002), Guinean footballer
- Alice Bah Kuhnke (born 1971), Swedish politician
- Aliyah Bah (born 2002 or 2003), American influencer known professionally as Aliyah's Interlude
- Almamy Schuman Bah (born 1974), Guinean footballer
- Asatu Bah Kenneth, Liberian activist and politician
- Belco Bah (1958–2020), Malian politician
- Bubacarr Bah, Gambian mathematician
- Cédric Bah (born 1994), Ivorian basketball player
- Chernor Bah (born 1985), Sierra Leonean politician
- Chernor Maju Bah (born 1972), Sierra Leonean lawyer and politician
- Dawda Bah (born 1983), Gambian footballer
- Diaryatou Bah (born 1985), Guinean activist
- Dounbia Bah (born 1967), Ivorian handball player
- Elage Bah (born 2004), Canadian soccer player
- Elhadj Bah (born 2001), Guinean footballer
- Eugenia Date-Bah, Ghanaian academic and author
- Fatoumatta Bah-Barrow (born 1974), First Lady of the Gambia
- Hadja Idrissa Bah (born 1999), Guinean activist
- Hamat Bah, Gambian politician
- Haymenn Bah-Traoré (born 1997), German footballer
- Ibrahim Bah (born 1969), Sierra Leonean footballer
- Ibrahima Bah (born 1999), Guinean footballer
- Ibrahima Kaba Bah (1931–2023), Guinean teacher and politician
- Issa Bah (born 2002), Luxembourgish footballer
- Lionel Bah (born 1980), Ivorian footballer
- Mamadou Bah (born 1988), Guinean footballer
- Mamadou Bah (judoka) (born 1962), Guinean judoka
- Mamadou Bah (swimmer) (born 1999), Guinean swimmer
- Mamadou Boye Bah (1930–2009), Guinean politician and economist
- Mamadou Samba Bah (born 1995), Guinean judoka
- Mahmoud Bah (born 1940), Guinean activist and writer
- Mahmadu Alphajor Bah (born 1981), Sierra Leonean footballer
- Mama Bah-Yéré (born 1992), Beninese footballer
- Mariam Bah (born 1976), Ivorian taekwondo competitor
- Mariama Sonah Bah (born 1978), Guinean judoka
- Mohammed Bah Abba (1964–2010), Nigerian teacher and inventor
- Momodou Alieu Bah, Gambian military officer and politician
- Monica Jusu Bah (born 2003), Swedish footballer
- Omar Bah (born 1979), Gambian psychologist, author, journalist and refugee
- Othello Bah (born 1995), Liberian footballer
- Oumar Bah (born 1995), Guinean footballer
- Penda Bah (born 1998), Gambian footballer
- Saïdou Bah (born 2003), Guinean footballer
- Samuel Date-Bah (born 1943), Ghanaian academic and judge
- Seedy Bah (born 1992), Gambian footballer
- Thierno Bah (born 1982), Guinean footballer
- Thierno Abdourahmane Bah (1916–2013), Guinean writer, theologian and politician
- Yunusa N. Bah, Gambian politician
- Zaïnoul Bah (born 1984), French basketball player

== Ba in China ==
- Ba Manzi, Chinese military general of the ancient Ba kingdom in the Warring States period (475–221 BCE)
- Ba Dai 巴岱 (1930–2022), politician
- Ba Denian 巴德年 (born 1938), immunologist, physician and educator
- Ba Dexin 巴德鑫 (born 1990), curler
- Ba Ge 巴戈 (1954–2022), Taiwanese actor and television host
- Ba Yan 巴燕 (born 1962), basketball player
- Ba Yongshan (born 1961), archer
- Ba Zhongtan (1930–2018), general of the People's Liberation Army

== See also ==
- Ba (given name), in Myanmar and ancient China
- Gabriel Bá (born 1976), Brazilian comic book artist
