= Diakité =

Diakité is a family name of Fula origin.

In Malian Fula culture, the surname Ba is considered equivalent.

People with the surname include:

== Music ==
- Abdoulaye Diakité (1950–2018), djembe master drummer from Senegal
- Jason Diakité (born 1975), better known as Timbuktu, Swedish musician
- Ramata Diakité (1976–2009), Malian Wassoulou musician

== Politics ==
- Josefina Pitra Diakité, ambassador of Angola to South Africa
- Madubuko Diakité, American human rights lawyer
- Mamadou Diakité (politician) (born 1950), Malian politician
- Moussa Diakité (politician) (192?–1985), Guinean politician during the presidency of Ahmed Sékou Touré
- Yoro Diakité (1932–1973), Malian politician

== Sports ==
- Mohamed Diakité (born 2012) A famous child prodigy for Mali
- Abdelaye Diakité (born 1990), French footballer
- Adama Diakité (born 1978), Malian footballer in 2002 African Cup of Nations
- Adama Diakité (footballer, born 1991), French footballer
- Adama Diakité (footballer, born 1993), Ivorian footballer in Italy
- Bafodé Diakité (born 2001), French footballer
- Bakary Diakité (born 1980), German-Malian footballer
- Binta Diakité (born 1988), Ivorian footballer
- Daouda Diakité (born 1983), Burkinabé football goalkeeper
- Drissa Diakité (born 1985), Malian footballer
- Fodé Bangaly Diakité (born 1985), Ivorian footballer
- Ismail Diakhité (born 1991), Mauritanian footballer
- Lamine Diakite (born 1991), Ivorian footballer
- Mamadi Diakite (born 1997), Guinean basketball player
- Mamadou Diakité (footballer) (born 1985), Malian footballer
- Mariam Diakité (born 1995), Ivorian footballer
- Modibo Diakité (born 1987), French footballer of Senegalese descent
- Mourtala Diakité (born 1980), Malian footballer
- Moussa Diakité (footballer, born 1998), Malian footballer
- Moussa Diakité (footballer, born 2003), Malian footballer
- Nouha Diakité (born 1980), Malian-French basketball player
- Papé Diakité (born 1992), Senegalese footballer
- Ramata Diakité (basketball) (born 1991), Malian basketball player
- Samba Diakité (born 1989), French-Malian footballer
- Soryba Diakité (born 1969), Guinean athlete
- Soumbeïla Diakité (born 1984), Malian footballer

== Others ==
- Sanoussi Diakité, Senegalese mechanical engineer and inventor of the Fonio husking machine
- Tidiane Diakité (1944–2025), Malian-born French historian and writer
- Youma Diakite (born 1971), Malian model, actress and television personality
