= Ba (given name) =

Ba is a given name. It is prevalent in Myanmar, and the ancient Chinese given names 跋, 霸, and 巴 (traditional Chinese in each case) are translated as Ba.

== People with the name ==
=== Ancient China ===
- Liu Ba 劉巴 (died 222), an official in the state of Shu Han
- Zang Ba 臧霸 (c. 162–230s), a military general
- Xiahou Ba 夏侯霸 (died c. 255–259), a military general of the state of Cao Wei i
- Feng Ba 馮跋 (died 430), an emperor of Northern Yan

=== Myanmar ===
- Ba Cho (1893–1947), newspaper publisher and politician
- Ba Gyan (1902–1953), cartoonist
- Ba Htay (1906–2000), businessman, administrator, and pioneer of Scouting
- Ba Htoo (1916–1945), officer in the Burma National Army
- Ba Kaung (1921–2003), activist
- Ba Kyi (1912–2000), artist
- Ba Lwin (1892–1968), headmaster
- Ba Maw (1893–1977), lawyer and political leader
- Ba Myint (born 1950), dental professor
- Ba Nyan (1897–1945), painter
- Ba Shin (born 1914), colonel and historian
- Ba Swe (1915–1987), Prime Minister of Burma
- Ba Than (historian) (1870s – c. 1931), school teacher, writer, and historian
- Ba Than (surgeon) (1895–1971), surgeon, educator and administrator
- Ba Thet (1903–1972), painter
- Ba U (1887–1963), politician and lawyer
- Ba Win (1901–1947), politician
- Ba Zaw (1891–1942), artist

=== Other people ===
- Ba Ag Moussa (1970s–2020), Malian militant and jihadist
- Ba Lobbo (fl. from 1840s), general of the Massina Empire
- Ba Mamadou Mbaré (1946–2013), Mauritanian politician

== People with the pseudonym ==
- Ba Ahmed (Ahmed bin Mūsa), Grand Wazir of Morocco and de facto ruler 1894–1900
- Ba Cụt (Le Quang Vinh, died 1956), Vietnamese military commander of the Hòa Hảo religious sect
- Ba Jin (Li Yaotang, 1904–2005), Chinese anarchist, translator and writer

== Fictional characters with the name ==
- Hung Ba, in the Fung Wan Hong Kong wuxia manhua series
- Ba Giai and Tú Xuất, in Northern Vietnam's popular folk tales

== See also ==
- Ba (surname)
