= Qingjian Group =

QINGJIAN GROUP CORPORATION LIMITED
- Trade name: CNQC
- Native name: QINGDAO CONSTRUCTION CORPORATION
- Company type: State owned enterprise until 2015, private actually
- Founded: 1952
- Headquarters: Qingdao, Shandong, China
- Revenue: 7.744 Billions USD Global Revenue 2014

Qingjian Group (formerly known as the Qingdao Construction Group Corporation) is a Chinese construction and engineering firm. It achieved an annual turnover in 2014 of 46.8 billion CNY (2014 Global Turnover 7.744 Billions USD; international incomes 1.315 Billions USD; domestic revenue 6.429 Billions USD (which 5.399 Billions USD from general construction + 1,030 Billions USD from real estate, logistics and investment). According to the Engineering News-Record annual Top Lists, Qingjian Group ranked respectively the positions 98th and 81st on the ENR TOP 250 International Contractors in 2014 and 2015, considered as well as the best private Chinese company overseas. In 2015, Qingjian Group ranked the position 43rd on the ENR TOP 250 Global Contractors in the world.

. One of its main international arms is Singapore-based Qingjian Realty, which has been responsible for major developments in the city-state.

In the Philippines, Qingjian has performed construction work funded by the Millennium Challenge Corporation, a US government foreign aid agency. It has won two of four construction contract packages under the Millennium Challenge Corporation's road building program. As a joint venture with Mac Builders, it won contract package 3 worth P2.46 to rehabilitate 64.58 kilometers of road from San Julian to Balangkayan in Eastern Samar and rehabilitate 17 bridges. Later on, Qingjian was awarded in 2013, contract package 2 worth P2.5 billion for the rehabilitation of a 63.68-kilometer road in Eastern Samar.
