= Mamadou Diakité =

Mamadou Diakité may refer to:

- Mamadou Diakité (footballer) (born 1985), Malian footballer
- Mamadou Diakité (politician) (born 1950), Malian politician
