= Nuclear family =

Group of two parents and their children

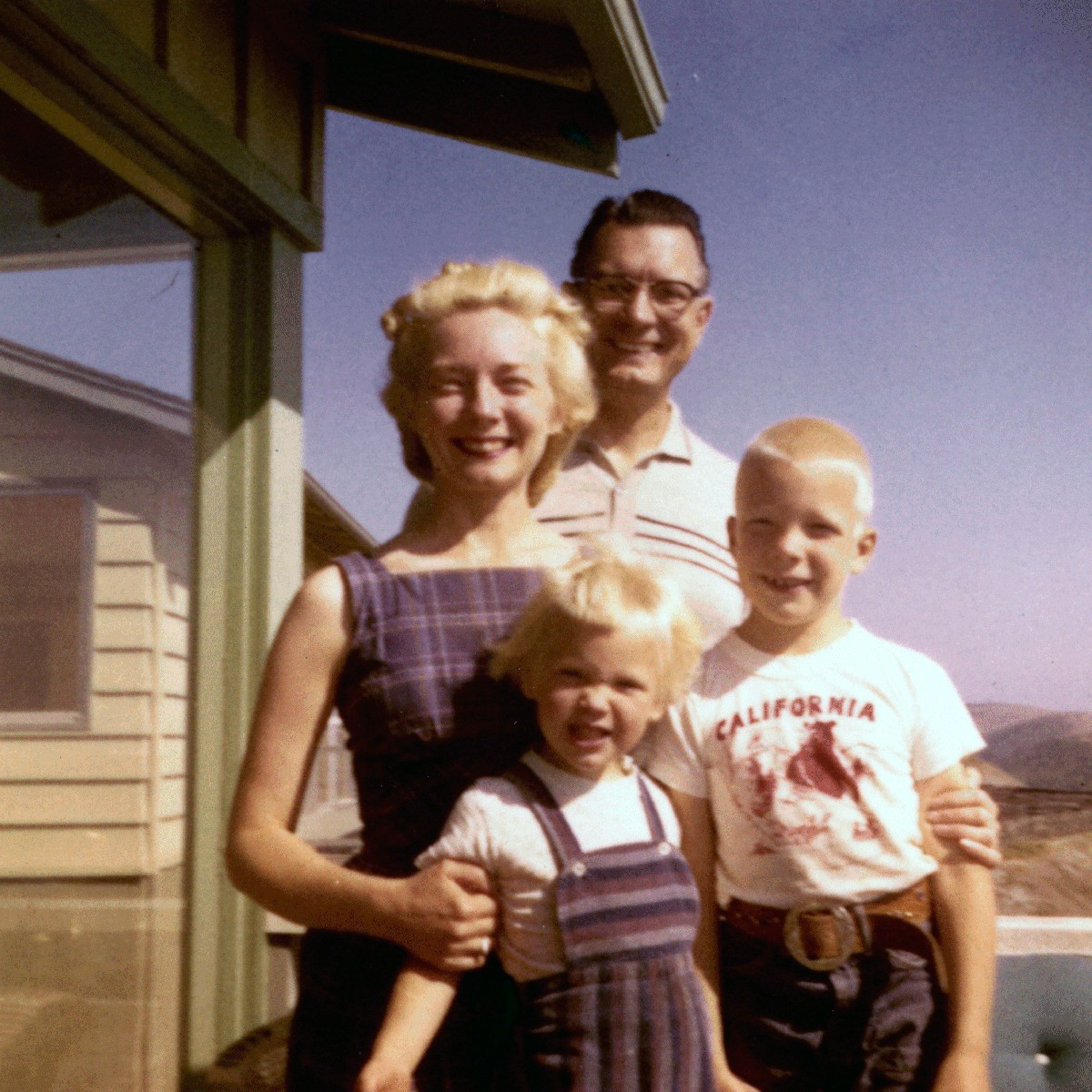
The Shumard family in Seattle, Washington, c. 1955 (during the mid-century baby boom), illustrating a nuclear family

A nuclear family – also called an elementary family, atomic family, or conjugal family – is a family group consisting of two parents and their children (one or more), typically living in one home residence. The term is used in contrast to both a single-parent family and a larger extended family (which may include grandparents, aunts, uncles, cousins, and other blood relatives or community members). A nuclear family typically centers on a married couple that may have any number of children.

Definitions differ among observers. Some definitions restrict the term to only biological children who are full-blood siblings, others consider adopted or half- and step-siblings a part of the immediate family, but another definition allows for a step-parent and any mix of dependent children, including stepchildren and adopted children.

Some sociologists and anthropologists consider the extended family structure to be the most common family structure in most cultures and at most times for humans, and the nuclear family to be a recent, modern departure.

== Etymology ==
The term nuclear family first appeared in the United States in the early 20th century. The American dictionary Merriam-Webster dates the term back to 1924, and the British Oxford English Dictionary has a reference to the term from 1925; thus the term is relatively new. The phrase is taken from the general use of the noun nucleus, originating in the Latin nux, meaning 'nut', i.e. the core of something. (Note: Any similarity to the terminology of nuclear warfare, nuclear power, nuclear fission etc. is therefore coincidental, even in spite of its association with the early Atomic Age.)

In its most common use, the term nuclear family refers to a household consisting of a mother, a father, and their children, all living in one household dwelling. George Murdock, an observer of families, offered an early description:

The family is a social group characterized by common residence, economic cooperation and reproduction. It contains adults of both sexes, at least two of whom maintain a socially approved relationship, and one or more children, own or adopted, of the sexually cohabiting adults.

Many individuals are part of two nuclear families in their lives: the family of origin from which they are offspring, and the family of procreation for which they are a parent.

Alternative definitions have evolved to include family units with same-sex parents, adoption of members, and perhaps additional adult relatives who take on a cohabiting parental role.

== History ==
DNA extracted from bones and teeth discovered at a 4,600-year-old Stone Age burial site in Germany has provided the earliest archaeological evidence of a family unit consisting of two parents with their multiple children.

Historians Alan Macfarlane and Peter Laslett, among other European researchers, say that nuclear families have been a primary arrangement in England since the 13th century. This primary arrangement was different from the typical arrangements in Southern Europe, in parts of Asia, and the Middle East, where it was common for young adults to remain residing in or marrying into a family home. Scholars such as Joseph Henrich have argued that this arrangement is a legacy of the Catholic Church’s medieval prohibition of cousin marriage, which dissolved extended kinship networks, thereby fostering the nuclear family structure. In England, multi-generational households were uncommon because young adults would save enough money to move out, into their own household once they married. Sociologist Brigitte Berger argued, "the young nuclear family had to be flexible and mobile as it searched for opportunity and property. Forced to rely on their own ingenuity, its members also needed to plan for the future and develop bourgeois habits of work and saving." Berger also mentions that this could be one of the reasons that the Industrial Revolution began in England and other Northwest European countries. However, the historicity of the nuclear family in England has been challenged by Cord Oestmann.

Influenced by church and theocratic governments, family unit structures of a married couple and their children were present in Western Europe and New England in the 17th century. With the emergence of proto-industrialization and early capitalism, the nuclear family became a financially viable social unit. Nonetheless, the results of Steven Ruggles' assessment of world census data suggest "nineteenth-century Northwest Europe and North America did not have exceptionally simple or nuclear family structure."

Since the time the term was coined, the number of North American nuclear families has gradually decreased, while the number of alternative family formations has increased.

== Compared with extended family ==
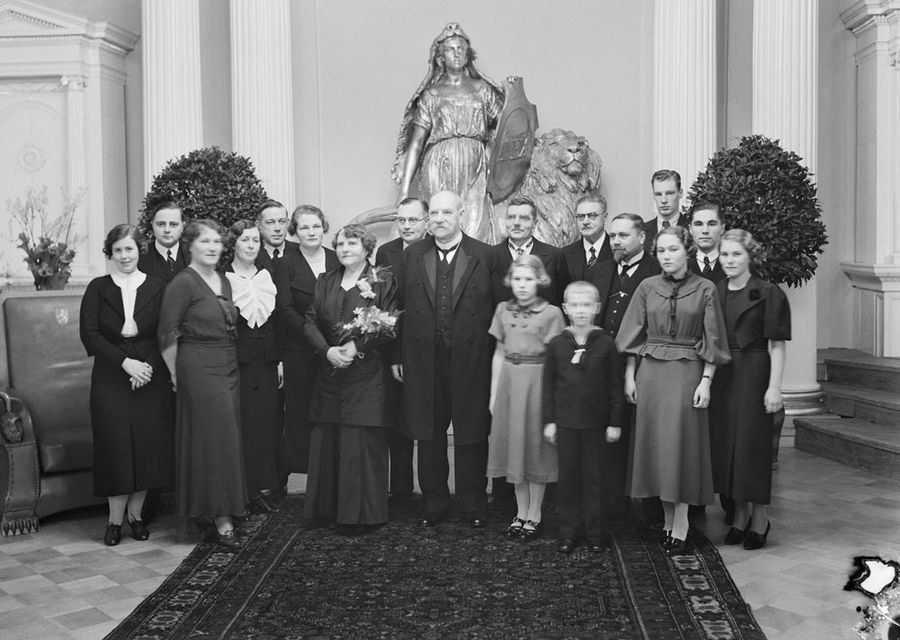
P. E. Svinhufvud, the president of Finland (center), with his extended family on his 75th birthday in 1936

An extended family group consists of non-nuclear (or "non-immediate") family members considered together with nuclear (or "immediate") family members. When extended family is involved they also influence children's development just as much as the parents would on their own. In an extended family resources are usually shared among those involved, adding more of a community aspect to the family unit. This is not limited to the sharing of objects and money, but includes sharing time. For example, extended family members such as grandparents are able to watch over grandchildren, allowing parents to pursue careers, and allows the parents to have reduced stress levels. Extended families also contribute to children's mental health due to increased resources in terms of adult support.

== Changes to family formation ==
Between 1960 and 2017, the nuclear family lost its dominant position in American society to other household arrangements.

In 2005, information from the United States Census Bureau showed that 70% of children in the U.S. lived in two-parent families, with 66% of those living with parents who were married, and 60% living with their biological parents. Furthermore, "the figures suggest that the tumultuous shifts in family structure since the late 1960s have leveled off since 1990". The Pew Research Center's analysis of data from the American Community Survey and the decennial census revealed that the number of children living outside of the traditional ideal of parents marrying young and staying together till death has risen precipitously between the mid-to-late 20th century and the early 21st century. In 2013, only 43% of children lived with married parents who are in their first marriage, down from 73% in 1960. Meanwhile, the share of children living with a single parent was 34% in 2013, up from 9% in 1960.

When considered separately from couples without children, single-parent families, and unmarried couples with children, the United States nuclear families appear to constitute a minority of households—with a rising prevalence of other family arrangements. In 2000, nuclear families with the original biological parents constituted roughly 24.10% of American households, compared with 40.30% in 1970. Roughly two-thirds of all children in the United States will spend at least some time in a single-parent household. According to some sociologists, "[The nuclear family] no longer seems adequate to cover the wide diversity of household arrangements we see today." (Edwards 1991; Stacey 1996). For this reason, a new term postmodern family has been introduced to describe the great variability in family forms, including single-parent families and couples without children. Nuclear family households are now less common compared to household with couples without children, single-parent families, and unmarried couples with children.

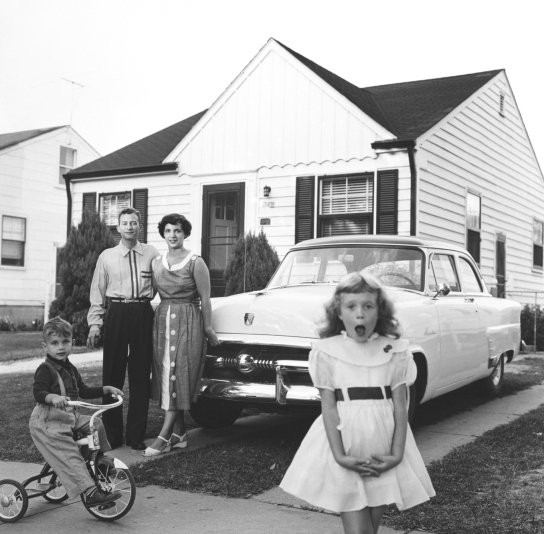
An employee of the Ford Motor Company with his family, car, and detached house in Detroit, Michigan, United States (1954).

In the UK, the number of nuclear families fell from 39.0% of all households in 1968 to 28.0% in 1992. The decrease accompanied an equivalent increase in the number of single-parent households and in the number of adults living alone.

Professor Wolfgang Haak of Adelaide University, detects traces of the nuclear family in prehistoric Central Europe. A 2005 archeological dig in Elau in Germany, analyzed by Haak, revealed genetic evidence suggesting that the 13 individuals found in a grave were closely related. Haak said, "By establishing the genetic links between the two adults and two children buried together in one grave, we have established the presence of the classic nuclear family in a prehistoric context in Central Europe.... Their unity in death suggest[s] a unity in life." This paper does not regard the nuclear family as "natural" or as the only model for human family life, expressed as, "This does not establish the elemental family to be a universal model or the most ancient institution of human communities. For example, polygamous unions are prevalent in ethnographic data and models of household communities have apparently been involving a high degree of complexity from their origins."

Lastly, large shifts in the financial landscape for families has made the historically middle class, traditional, nuclear family structure significantly more risky, expensive, and unstable. The expenses associated with raising a family; notably housing, medical care, and education, have all increased very rapidly, particularly since the 1950s. Since then middle class incomes have stagnated or even declined, whilst living costs have soared to the point where even two-income households are now unable to offer the same level of financial stability that once was possible under the single-income nuclear family household of the 1950s.

== Influences upon family size ==
As a fertility factor, single nuclear family households generally have a higher number of children than co-operative living arrangements, according to studies from both the Western world and India.

There are studies that show a difference in the number of children wanted per household according to where the family lives, finding that families living in rural areas wanted to have more children than families living in urban areas. A study conducted in Japan between October 2011 and February 2012 further researched the influence of area of residence on mean desired number of children. Researchers of the study in Japan came to the conclusion that the women living in rural areas with larger families were more likely to want more children, compared to women who lived in urban areas.

== Connections to traditionalism ==
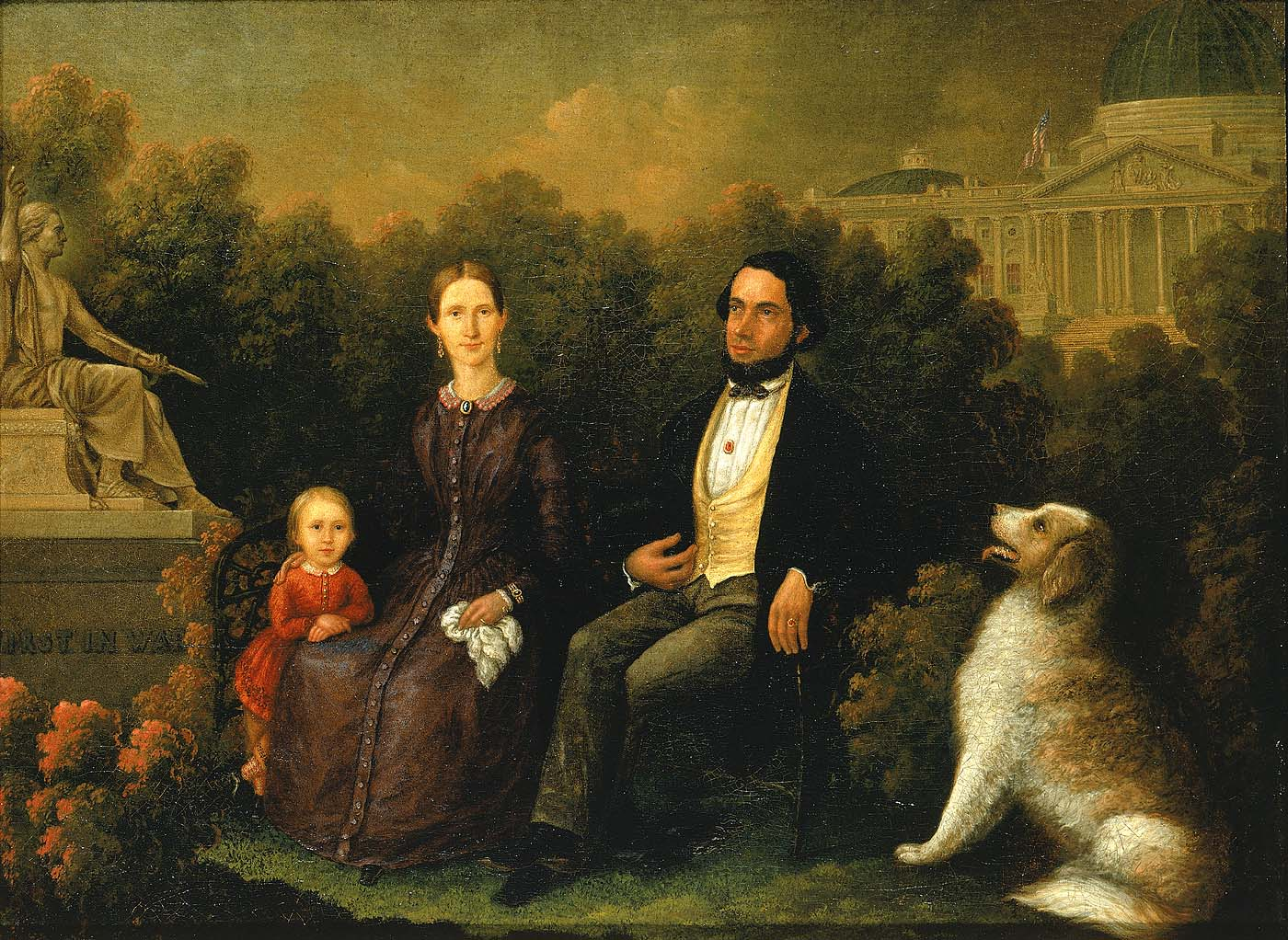
Painting of an unknown nuclear family in Washington, D.C., dated 1850

For social conservatism in the United States and Canada, the idea that the nuclear family is traditional is a very important aspect, where family is the primary unit of society. These movements oppose alternative family forms and social institutions that are seen by them to undermine parental authority. The number of nuclear families is slowly dwindling in the U.S. as more women pursue higher education, develop professional lives, and delay having children until later in their life. Children and marriage have become less appealing as many women continue to face societal, familial, and/or peer pressure to give up their education and career to focus on stabilizing the home. As ethnic and cultural diversity continues to grow in the United States, it has become more difficult for the traditional nuclear family to remain a norm. Data from 2014 also suggests that single parents and the likelihood of children living with one parent is correlated with race. The Pew Research Center projected that 54% of African Americans will be single parents compared to only 19% of European Americans. Several factors account for the differences in family structure including economic and social class. Differences in education level also change the percentage of single parents. In 2014, 46% of children raised by a parent(s) with less than a high school education were raised by a single parent compared to 12% raised by a parent(s) who graduated from college.

Critics of the term traditional family point out that in most cultures and at most times in history, the extended family model has been the most common, not the nuclear family. The nuclear family has had a longer tradition in England than in other parts of Europe and Asia. England contributed large numbers of immigrants to the Americas, likely influencing the form considered "traditional" there and during the 1960s and 1970s, the nuclear family was documented as the most common form in the U.S.

The assertion that the nuclear family is central to stability in modern society, which has been promoted by socially conservative familialists in the United States, has been challenged as historically and sociologically inadequate to describe the complexity of family relations dynamics. In "Freudian Theories of Identification and Their Derivatives" Urie Bronfenbrenner states, "Very little is known about the extent variation in the behavior of fathers and mothers towards sons and daughters, and even less about the possible effects on such differential treatment." Little is known about how parental behavior and identification processes work, and how children interpret sex role learning. In his theory, he uses "identification" with the father in the sense that the son will follow the sex role provided by his father and then for the father to be able to identify the difference of the "cross sex" parent for his daughter.

== Law ==
Western societies often treat marriage as a legally-binding relationship, rather than an informal agreement. In these societies, both partners usually share control of their children's upbringing. They both have roles as a parent to protect their children, oversee the development of their children in society, and see to the survival of their children. The term is also applied to partners who are in a committed relationship, but not legally married.

== See also ==
- Astronaut family
- Clan
- Extended family
- Family relationships
- Family values
- Hajnal line
- Human bonding
- Immediate family
- Intentional community
- Inuit kinship
- Joint family
- Kibbutz § Child rearing
- Origins of society
- Sociology of the family
- Structural functionalism
- Alliance theory
- Types of marriages

== Bibliography ==
- Bryant, Leah E. (2016). "Nuclear Families". Encyclopedia of Family Studies. pp. 1–3. doi:10.1002/9781119085621.wbefs490. ISBN 978-1-119-08562-1.
- Scott, John (2014). "family, conjugal". A Dictionary of Sociology (4 ed.). Oxford University Press. ISBN 9780199683581.
- Oppong, Christine (November 1970). "Conjugal Power and Resources: An Urban African Example". Journal of Marriage and Family. 32 (4): 676–680. doi:10.2307/350261. JSTOR 350261.
- Durkheim, Emile. "The conjugal family". Emile Durkheim on institutional analysis (1978): 229-239.
- Khatri, A. A. (1975-01-01). "The Adaptive Extended Family in India Today". Journal of Marriage and Family. 37 (3): 633–642. doi:10.2307/350528. JSTOR 350528.
