= Alioune Ba =

Alioune Ba may refer to:

- Alioune Bâ (born 1959), Malian photographer
- Alioune Ba (footballer) (born 1989), French footballer
