= Global Land Coalition =

- A Coalition of Experts
- Purpose: To develop long-term solutions for effective land use in developing countries
- Website: Global Land Coalition home page

The Global Land Coalition was formed by assembling a group of experts and researchers with extensive land-related experience. The coalition's overall mission is to develop long-term solutions for effective land use in developing countries. The Coalition works with many organizations including the World Bank, United States Agency for International Development, International Land Coalition, Millennium Challenge Corporation, and the Asian Development Bank.

== Mission ==
The Global Land Coalition's primary objective is to combine classic land-use theory with local requirements to produce custom solutions for each country. The coalition's secondary objective is to train and support a cadre of local government, community and business leaders to ensure long-term substantial change. It is hoped that this organization will serve as an innovative way to connect a team of selected experts with key funding agencies and with leaders in developing countries that need improved land use policy, implementation, and training.

== Areas of expertise ==
The Global Land Coalition has broad experience with land-related projects in developing countries. Its expertise is concentrated in the following key categories: Policy Reform, Institutional Reform, Legal Reform, Land Use Planning, Land Information Systems, and Environmental Conservation.

The coalition uses distance education and training technology to connect members in the resource team with leaders in the developing countries on an ongoing and cost-effective basis. This is particularly useful when the country has an unstable political environment that is not safe for contractors. Access to experts and continued training improves the chances for successful project outcomes.
