= Extended family =

Family that extends beyond the immediate family

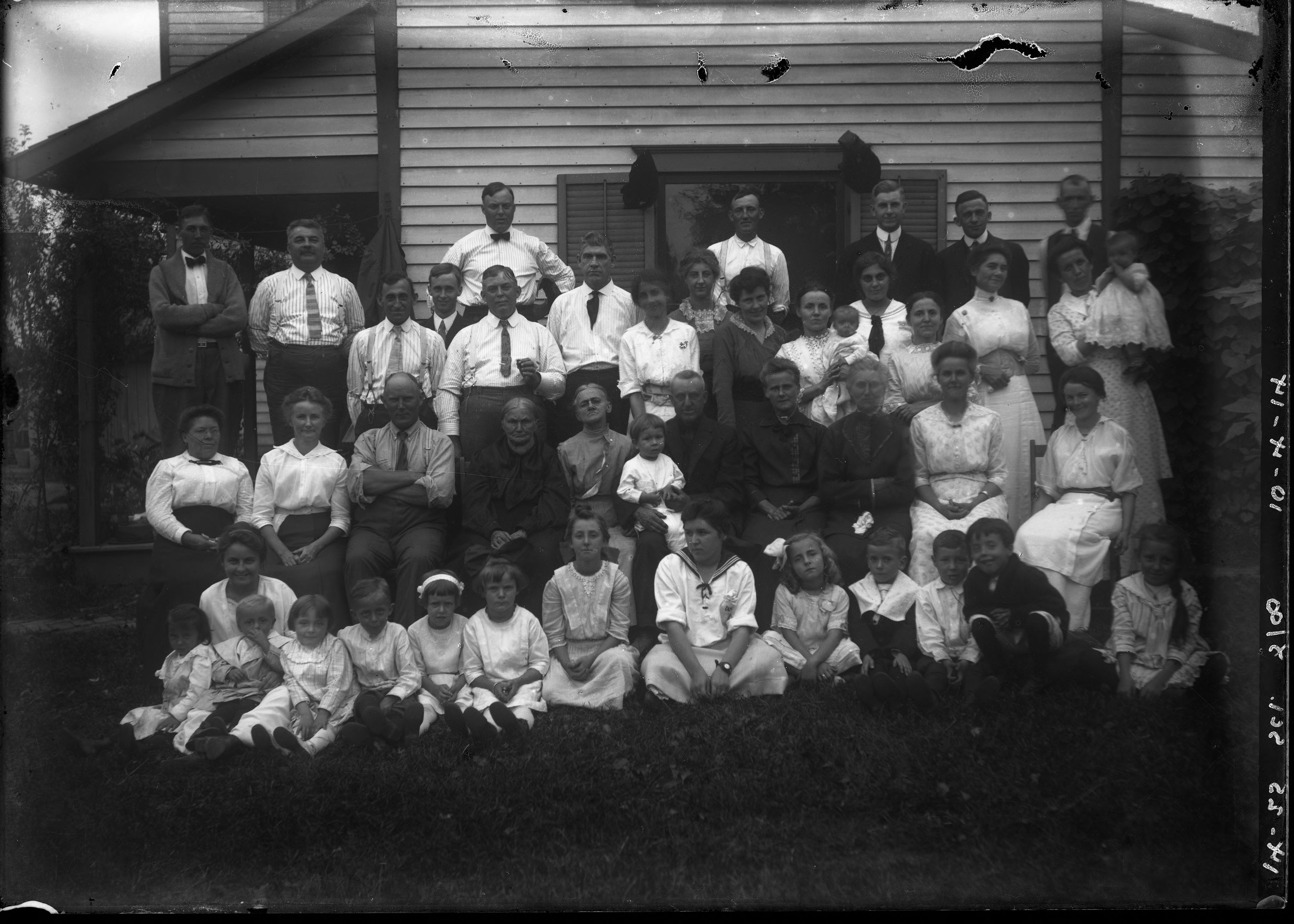
1914 extended family photograph

An extended family is a family that extends beyond the nuclear family of parents and their children to include aunts, uncles, grandparents, cousins, other blood relatives or even community members, all living nearby or in the same household. Particular forms include the stem and joint families.

== Description ==
In some circumstances, the extended family comes to live either with or in place of a member of the immediate family. These families include, in one household or close proximity, relatives in addition to an immediate family. An example would be an elderly parent who moves in with their children due to old age. In modern Western cultures dominated by immediate family constructs, the term has come to be used generically to refer to grandparents, uncles, aunts, and cousins, whether they live together within the same household or not. However, it may also refer to a family unit in which several generations live together within a single household. In some cultures, the term is used synonymously with consanguineous family.

A stem family is a kind of extended family, first discussed by Frédéric Le Play. Parents will live with one child and his/her spouse, as well as the children of both, while other children will leave the house or remain in it, unmarried. The stem family is sometimes associated with inegalitarian inheritance practices, as in Japan and Korea, but the term has also been used in some contexts to describe a family type where parents live with a married child and their spouse and children, but the transfer of land and moveable property is more or less egalitarian, as in the case of traditional Romania, northeastern Thailand or Mesoamerican indigenous peoples. In these cases, the child who cares for the parents usually receives the house in addition to their own share of land and moveable property.

== Sociology ==
Often, it has been presumed that extended family groups sharing a single household enjoy specific advantages, such as a greater sense of security and belonging due to sharing a wider pool of members to serve as resources during a crisis, and more role models to help perpetuate desired behavior and cultural values. However, even in cultures in which adults are expected to leave home after marriage to begin their own nuclear-based households, the extended family often forms an important support network offering similar advantages. Particularly in working-class communities, grown children tend to establish their own households within the same general area as their parents, aunts, uncles, and grandparents. These extended family members tend to gather often for family events and to feel responsible for helping and supporting one another, both emotionally and financially.

While contemporary families may be considered more mobile in general than in the past, sociologists find that this has not necessarily resulted in the disintegration of extended family networks. Rather, technological aids such as the Internet and social networking sites such as Facebook are now commonly used to retain contact and maintain these family ties.

Particularly in the case of single-parent households, it can be helpful for extended family members to share a single household in order to share the burden of meeting expenses. On the other hand, sharing a household can present a disadvantage depending on the sizes and number of families involved, particularly when only a few members shoulder most of the responsibility to meet expenses for the family's basic needs.

An estimated 49 million Americans (16.1% of the total population) live in homes comprising three or more generations, up from 42 million in 2000. This situation is similar in Western Europe. Another 34 percent live within a kilometer of their children.

== Around the world ==
In many cultures, such as in those of Asians, Middle Easterners, Africans, Indigenous peoples like Native Americans and Pacific Islanders, and Latin Americans and Caribbeans, even for Eastern Europeans and Southern Europeans (Orthodox/Catholic countries), extended families are the basic family unit. That is to say the modern western nuclear family is not the norm. Even in Western Europe, extended families (mostly of the stem type) were also clearly prevalent, England being a rare exception. In Britain and the United States, during the Industrial Revolution (approximately 1750 to 1900), more people lived in extended families than at any time before or since.

It is common for today's world to have older children in nuclear families to reach walking up to driving age ranges before meeting extended family members. Geographical isolation is common for middle-class families who move based on occupational opportunities while family branches "retain [their] basic independence". Some extended families hold family reunions or opportunities for gathering regularly, normally around holiday time frames, to reestablish and integrate a stronger family connection. This allows individual nuclear families to connect with extended family members.

Where families consist of multiple generations living together, the family is usually headed by the elders. More often than not, it consists of grandparents, their sons, and their sons' families in patriarchal and especially patrilineal societies. Extended families make discussions together and solve the problem.

=== Indian subcontinent ===
Historically, for generations South Asia had a prevailing tradition of the joint family system or undivided family. The joint family system is an extended family arrangement prevalent throughout the Indian subcontinent, particularly in India, consisting of many generations living in the same home, all bound by the common relationship. A patrilineal joint family consists of an older man and his wife, his sons and unmarried daughters, his sons' wives and children. The family is headed by a patriarch, usually the oldest male, who makes decisions on economic and social matters on behalf of the entire family. The patriarch's wife generally exerts control over the household, minor religious practices and often wields considerable influence in domestic matters. Family income flows into a common pool, from which resources are drawn to meet the needs of all members, which are regulated by the heads of the family.

=== Recent trend in the United States ===
In the early stages of the twentieth century, it was not very common to find many families with extended kin in their household, which may have been due to the idea that the young people in these times typically waited to establish themselves and start a household before they married and filled a home. As life expectancy becomes older and programs such as Social Security benefit the elderly, the old are now beginning to live longer than prior generations, which then may lead to generations mixing together. According to results of a study by Pew Research Center in 2010, approximately 50 million (nearly one in six) Americans, including rising numbers of seniors, live in households with at least two adult generations, and often three. It has become an ongoing trend for elderly generations to move in and live with their children, as they can give them support and help with everyday living. The main reasons cited for this shift are an increase in unemployment and slumped housing prices and arrival of new immigrants from Asian and South American countries. According to the U.S. Census Bureau, there were 2.7 million grandparents raising their grandchildren in 2009. The dramatic increase in grandparent-headed households has been attributed to many factors including parental substance abuse. In 2003, the number of U.S. "family groups" where one or more subfamilies live in a household (e.g. a householder's daughter has a child. The mother-child is a subfamily) was 79 million. Two-point-six million of U.S. multigenerational family households in 2000 had a householder, the householder's children, and the householder's grandchildren. That is 65 percent of multigenerational family households in the U.S. So it is twice as common for a grandparent to be the householder than for adult children to bring parents into their home. The increase in the number of multigenerational households has created complex legal issues, such as who in the household has authority to consent to police searches of the family home or private bedrooms.

Besides the legal issues that multigenerational households could create, there are issues that may arise from households where the grandparents are the sole guardians. The Supporting Grandparents Raising Grandchildren Act was signed into law on July 7, 2018 after unanimously passing the U.S. House and Senate. It was first introduced in the Senate on May 10, 2017 by Senators Susan Collins (R-ME) and Bob Casey Jr. (D-PA). Out of this came The Supporting Grandparents Raising Grandchildren Advisory Council which will identify, promote, coordinate, and disseminate to the public information, resources, and the best practices available to help grandparents and other older relatives both meet the needs of the children in their care and maintain their own physical and mental health and emotional well-being.

=== Mexico ===
Mexican society is composed of three-generational units consisting of grandparents, children, and grandchildren. Further close relationships are maintained with the progenitors of these families and are known as kin or "cousins". When one is born, they are born into two extended families, a kinship group of sometimes 70 people. The group traditionally acts as a cohesive unit, pooling resources and influence. The extended family also consists of spouses and siblings. This is in contrast to the two generational American nuclear family.

Some scholars have used the term "grand-family" to describe the close relationship between grandparents, children, and grandchildren in Mexican society. Larissa A. Lomnitz and Marisol Perez-Lizaur, for example, describe the grand-family as "the basic unit of family solidarity in Mexico", where basic family obligations between grandparents, children, and grandchildren include "economic support, participation in family rituals, and social recognition".

=== Economic background ===
The relative economic deprivation of racial and ethnic minorities leads to higher levels of extended family involvement; primarily because blacks and Latinos have less money and education than whites, they are more likely to give and receive help from kin. Having family on which one can rely is very important in times of economic hardship especially if there are children involved. Living in an extended family provides constant care for children and support for other members of the family as well. Analysis of the National Survey of Families and Households suggests there are differences between whites and other ethnic groups because of economic differences among racial groups: blacks and Latinos less often have the economic resources that allow the kind of privatization that the nuclear family entails. Extended kinship, then, is a survival strategy in the face of economic difficulties. Being able to rely on not only two parents but grandparents, aunts, uncles, brothers, and sisters helps to create a support system which in turn brings families closer together. Living in an extended family provides many things that a nuclear family does not.

The number of multigenerational households has been steadily rising because of the economic hardships people are experiencing today. According to the AARP, multigenerational households have increased from 5 million in 2000 to 6.2 million in 2008. "There's no question that with some ethnicities that are growing in America, it is more mainstream and traditional to have multigenerational households. We're going to see that increasing in the general population as well," says AARP's Ginzler. While high unemployment and housing foreclosures of the recession have played a key role in the trend, Pew Research Center exec VP and co-author of its multigenerational household study Paul Taylor said it has been growing over several decades, fueled by demographic and cultural shifts such as the rising number of immigrants and the rising average age of young-adult marriages. The importance of an extended family is one that many people may not realize, but having a support system and many forms of income may help people today because of the difficulties in finding a job and bringing in enough money.

== See also ==
- Cluster genealogy
