= Qingjian Realty =

Qingjian Realty (South Pacific) Group Pte Ltd
- Founded: 2008
- Headquarters: Singapore

Qingjian Realty is a real estate company based in Singapore, which is part of the Qingjian Group Co., Ltd.

Qingjian Realty was incorporated as a separate entity in 2008.
