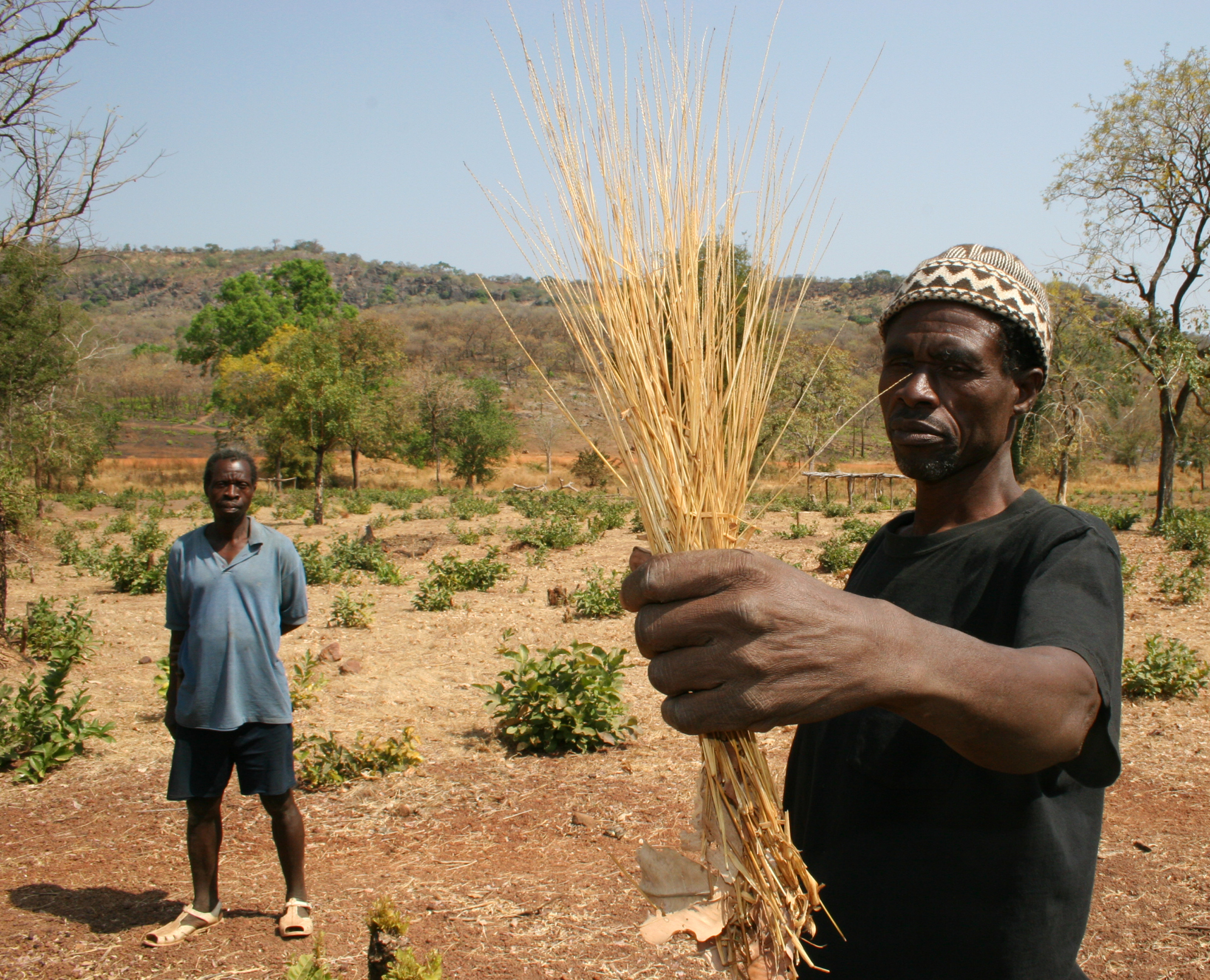

Scientific classification
- Kingdom: Plantae
- Clade: Tracheophytes
- Clade: Angiosperms
- Clade: Monocots
- Clade: Commelinids
- Order: Poales
- Family: Poaceae
- Subfamily: Panicoideae
- Genus: Digitaria
- Species: D. exilis

Binomial name
- Digitaria exilis (Kippist) Stapf

Synonyms
- Panicum exile (Kippist) A.Chev. nom. illeg.; Paspalum exile Kippist; Syntherisma exile (Kippist) Newbold

= Digitaria exilis =

Species of grass

Digitaria exilis is a species of grass that is referred to as findi or fundi in areas of Africa such as The Gambia, (Note: "also known at Findi, Fonio, Hungry rice, Fonio blanc and Petit mil is the dry seed of Digitaria exilis, a grass indigenous to West Africa") with the English common names white fonio, fonio millet, hungry rice, and acha rice.

It is the most important of a diverse group of wild and domesticated Digitaria species known as fonio that are harvested in the savannas of West Africa. The grains are very small. It has potential to improve nutrition, boost food security, foster rural development and support sustainable use of the land.

Fonio has continued to be important locally because it is both nutritious and one of the world's fastest growing cereals, reaching maturity in as little as six to eight weeks. It is a crop that can be relied on in semi-arid areas with poor soils, where rains are brief and unreliable.

The small grains make it difficult and time-consuming to remove the husk. Traditional methods include pounding it in a mortar with sand, while more recent methods include a fonio husking machine. The grains are used to make foods such as porridge.

== Description ==
The fonio is an annual, erect herbaceous plant which reaches stature heights from 30 to 80 centimeters. The ears consist of two to five narrow part ears, which are up to 15 centimeters long. The spikelets comprise a sterile flower and a fertile flower, the latter of which gives rise to the fonio grain. The grain is a caryopsis, which remains surrounded by glumes and husks. Its size is very small, only 1.5 mm (around 2,000 seeds to 1 gram). The colour ranges from white, yellow and purple.

Fonio matures faster than all other cereals. Some varieties can already be harvested 42–56 days after sowing. Others ripen more slowly, usually in 165–180 days.

The genetic diversity of D. exilis varies from region to region in Africa. For example, not much genetic diversity was detected among the domesticated D. exilis landraces from Mali. In contrast, large levels of genetic diversity were detected among the domesticated D. exilis landraces of the Upper Niger River Basin of West Africa. The many different landraces of D. exilis are affected differently by the various processing methods.

=== Chemistry ===
Compared to starches like D. iburua and Eleusine coracana, D. exilis has more branched molecules. This was an important finding because although it has more branched molecules, it has fewer chains than the other starches which is unusual chemically. Aside from these differences, most other chemical characteristics were very similar to rice which was not surprising because D. exilis and rice are both starches of the A. crystalline type. Additionally, the microstructure of D. exilis was studied, and it was discovered that it is very similar to the grain millets. Researchers found that D. exilis is most abundant in protein bodies and that most of the protein is located towards the center of the cell. The specific structure of Digitaria exilis was analyzed and it was found that it is surrounded by thin bracts and two glumes. The caryopsis, a type of fruit that contains a pericarp that is fused with a thin seed coat, of the D. exilis contains several layers that serve the purpose of protecting the endosperm and embryonic tissues.

The composition of fonio can differ depending on what part of the world you are in. The main differences are in the protein and fiber content. This information could be useful in giving people dietary advice if their diet is lacking a certain protein or fiber.

== Varieties ==
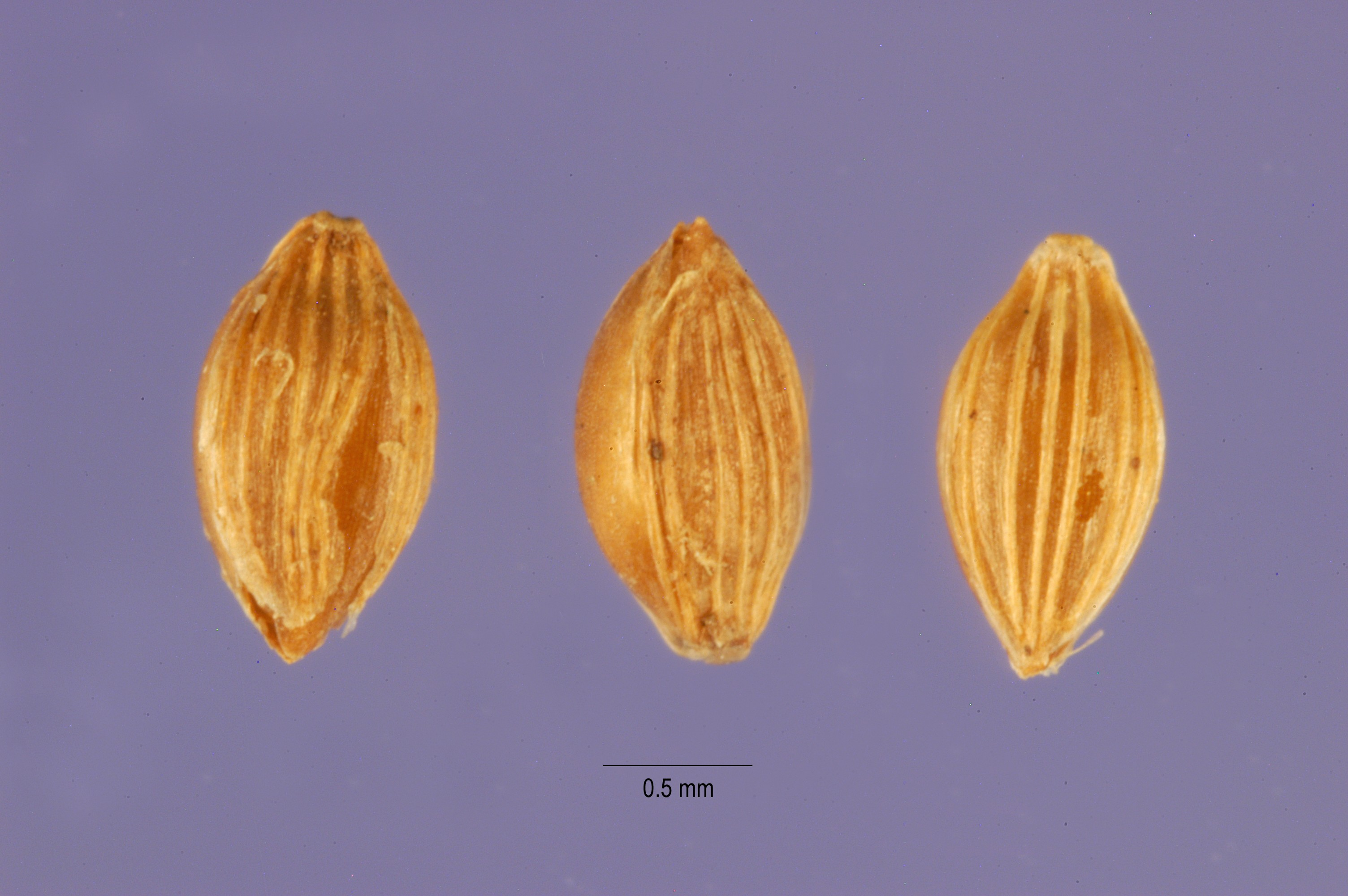
Three seeds of white fonio

Identified varieties of Digitaria exilis are:

- var. gracilis - Kankan region (Guinea)
- var. stricta - Casamance (Senegal), Guinea, Mali, and Burkina Faso
- var. rustica - Casamance (Senegal), Guinea, Mali, and Burkina Faso
- var. mixta - Guinea
- var. densa - Togo

== Etymology ==
The name (borrowed by English from French) is from Wolof foño.

== Cultivation ==
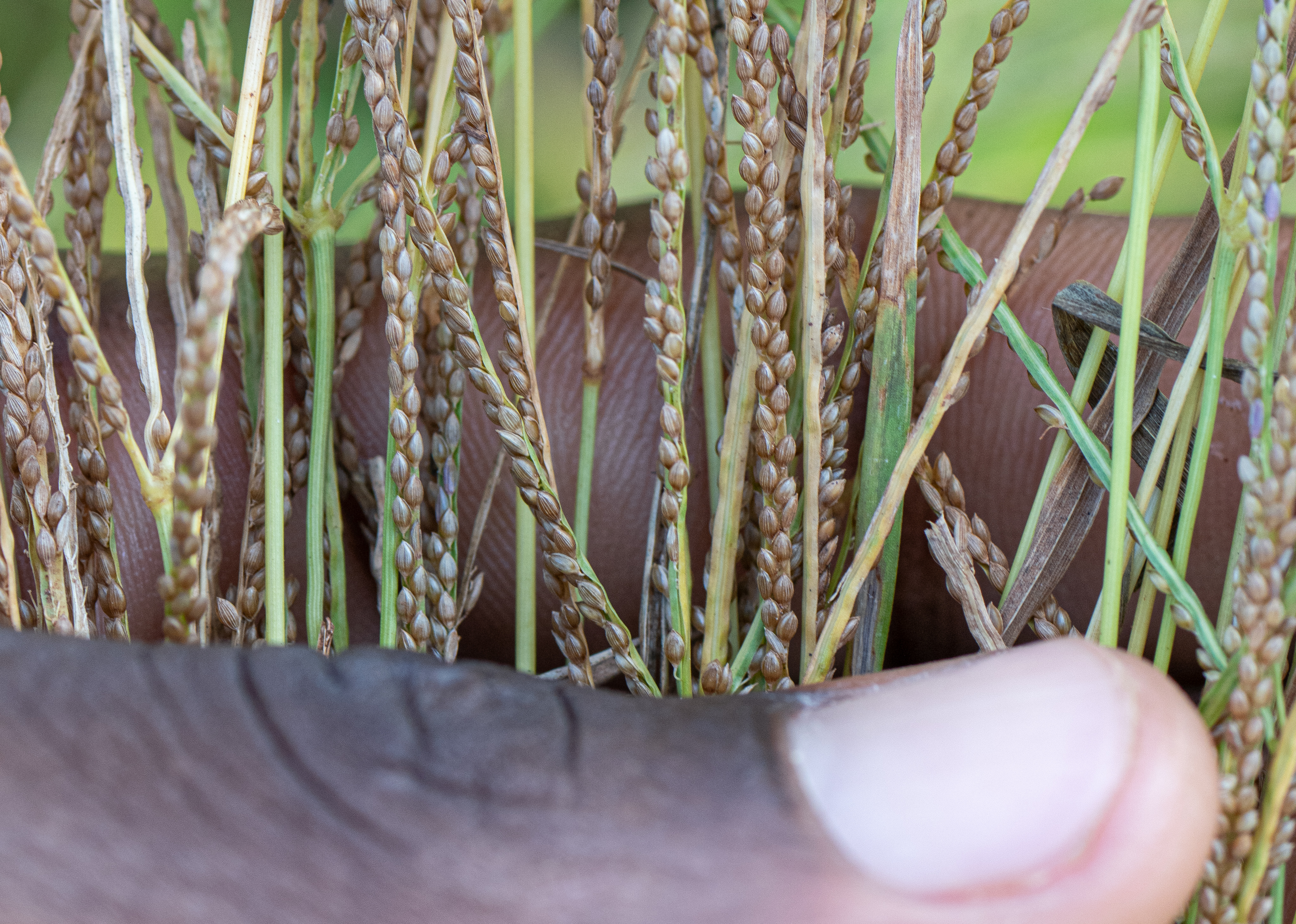
Fonio panicles maturing in Natitingou, northern Benin

Fonio is one of the ancient African crops, possibly the oldest West African crop as its cultivation seems to have started about 7,000 years ago. The first references to fonio as food are reported from the mid-14th century. D. exilis was originally derived from the wild species D. longiflora.

Significant cultivation is in West Africa from Chad to Cape Verde, south Mali, in western Burkina Faso, eastern Senegal, northern Guinea, north Benin, parts of north central Nigeria such as northern Plateau State, Southern Kaduna, parts of Niger State, Abuja (FCT), Zuru area of Kebbi State, some parts of Nasarawa State and Kogi State, as well as parts of Bauchi State. It is also found in south Niger, where the plant supplies the staple food for several million people. In some regions of Mali, Burkina Faso, Guinea and Nigeria, fonio is the most important or one of the main cereals. White fonio has its main growing region in the highland plateaus of Nigeria, where it is popularly called acha. The second fonio species, iburu or black fonio, is limited to the Jos-Bauchi Plateau in Nigeria and the northern regions of Togo and Benin.

Fonio is grown in parts of the Dominican Republic, where it has already brought in 1500 from West Africa, first only grown as a weed, but it is now cultivated again. The European Commission with the EU Regulation L 323/1 of December 19, 2018, approved the commercialization in Europe of fonio as Novel Food, upon the scientific dossier managed and submitted by Italian company Obà Food.

Production and cultivation area (2013)
Country	Production (tons)	Area (hectares)
Guinea	429 000	300 000
Nigeria	90 000	165 000
Mali	22 000	34 000
Burkina Faso	20 000	25 000
Ivory Coast	17 000	15 000
Niger	6 000	11 000
Benin	1 300	1 900
Senegal	1 000	1 500
Guinea Bissau	700	600
Total	587 000	554 000

=== Yield ===
More than 550,000 ha of fonio are grown each year in West Africa and the production runs at 587,000 tons. Yields are relatively stable, the yield average is currently 1 ton per hectare (ha). In the peripheral regions the yields are less than 500 kilograms and drop when in very poor soils down to 150 to 200 kilograms.

=== Climate and soil requirements ===
Fonio is cultivated in West Africa under tropical climate, with a pronounced dry season, temperatures between 25 and 30 °C and annual rainfalls of 600 to 1200 mm. Nevertheless, fonio is also grown in higher altitude: over 1000 m, with higher annual rainfalls (1200 to 1500 mm) and colder temperatures (15-25°). Fonio has a well developed root system, which can reach more than one meter depth in the soil. This root system explains the good performance of the plant during the dry season and its adaptation to poor and low fertility soils. Fonio is mainly grown on sandy soils, but can also grow on rocky soils. It also thrives on acidic clay soils with a high aluminium content. On heavy soils, most varieties thrive badly. This crop is low demanding and can cope with unfavourable climate and soil conditions.

=== Field management ===
Throughout Africa, most of the work is done by hand.

==== Before sowing ====
The main tasks to do before sowing are the cleaning of the field and ploughing. Sometimes animals are used for ploughing or a daba is utilized to do a superficial scratching.

==== Sowing and upkeep ====
The sowing time starts with the first rainfalls. This can vary depending on the variety and the geographical area of cultivation. The grains used for sowing are the best grains kept from the precedent harvest and are sown by hand (broadcast seeding). Sometimes the seeds are mixed with sand to have a more homogenous repartition on the soil. The seeds remain on the surface, so successive harrowing by hand or with the daba is needed to bury them slightly in the soil. Normally 30–40 kg/ha of seeds are used, but sometimes more than 70 kg/ha are sown, in order to control weeds at time of emergence. For germination and emergence a temperature of 30 °C is optimal. The germination and growth is rapid, and for the upkeep of the crop only weeding is needed.

=== Pests ===
Insect pests include:

- shoot flies, Atherigona spp.
- stem borer, Chilo partellus
- some species of thrips, bugs, and grasshoppers
- white-backed plant hopper, Sogatella furcifera (vector of the pangola stunt virus)

=== Harvest and post-harvest processing ===
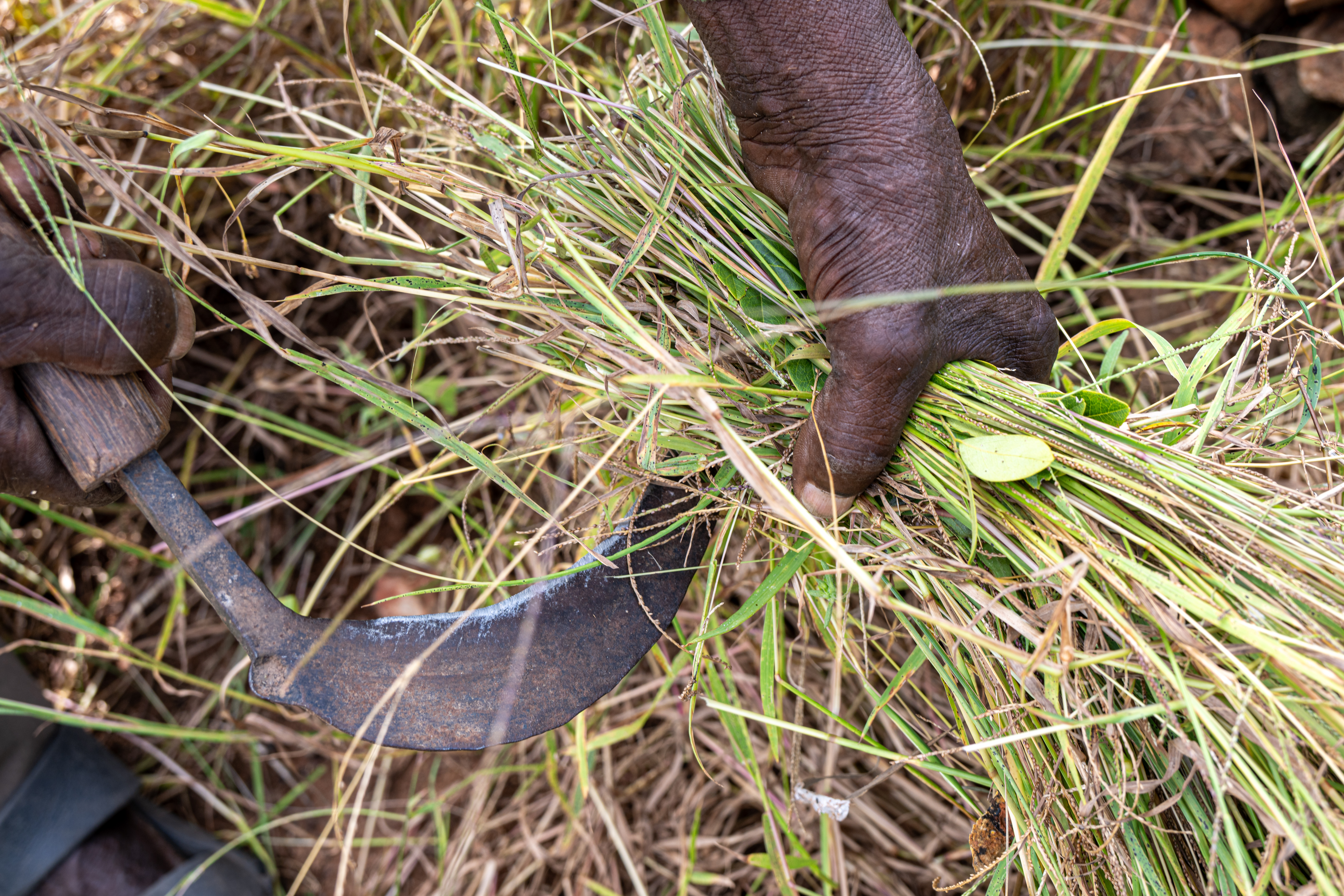
Traditional fonio harvest with a sickle, Natitingou, northern Benin

Most of the harvesting is still done by hand. As soon as the grains reach maturity, usually in July or August, men cut the fonio with sickles while women and children gather it into sheaves. A motor-driven mower may be used to assist in this. The sheaves must be stored in a dry and well ventilated area to prevent mould formation. During the dry season, sheaves are piled to large stacks in the sun to completely dry them. Threshing is done manually as well. Tractor-driven threshers are rarely used due to higher costs and a higher loss of the small grains. Grains are stored loosely. Hulls must be removed before consumption as they are not digestible. This process is traditionally carried out by women using mortars with sand. After the fifth hulling, the fonio is called "whitened". Adhering grit and sand is washed away with the help of gourds. This process requires a highly skilled woman and up to 10 liters of clean water per one kilogram of fonio. The husk can also be "popped" over a flame and then pounded (a technique used among the Akposso that yields a toasted color grain).

Industrial machinery has been developed to replace the traditional, labour-intensive process. The invention of a simple fonio husking machine offers an easier mechanical method. It is possible to adapt rice threshing machines for use on fonio. Winnowing machines or rotational sieves may then be used to clean threshed seeds. CIRAD developed the GMBF hulling machine specifically for use on fonio. However, due to the high cost and performance of such machines, multiple villages must operate the machines together for the investment to be economically viable.

Digitaria exilis is a crop that has not been pursued for domestication worldwide, but has many qualities that make it a good crop candidate. Digitaria exilis is an annual plant with a C4 metabolism and medium height. It can be planted on its own or in the marginal land, among other crops. Farmers value how quickly D. exilis matures. The crop reaches maturity in as little as six to eight weeks.

Digitaria exilis also has good sustainability qualities and can survive in difficult environments. After being exposed to washing and scarifying treatments, the crop maintained germination rates. Digitaria exilis has also germinated well in various soil types, such as sand and loam. The crop requires little input and can survive on rain. It is adapted to marginal land: it does well in poor soil and is drought resistant. All these characteristics make D. exilis a potential good crop candidate.

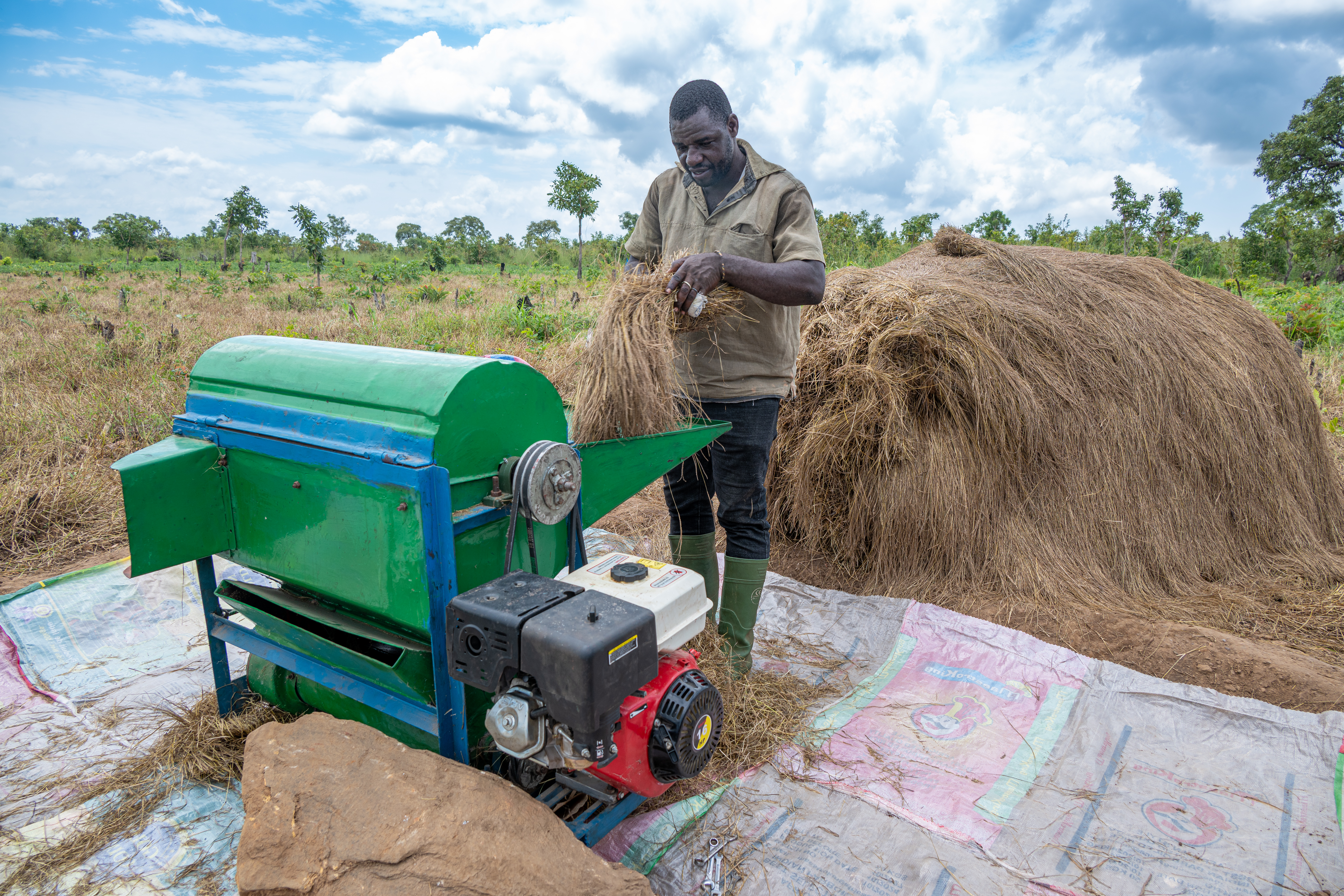
Threshing fonio with a small-scale machine, Natitingou, northern Benin

Digitaria exilis can be harvested in a number of ways. Some farmers uproot them to get the seeds, but other methods may be more effective. Sickles are used to cut the part of the plant containing the seeds rather than destroying the whole plant. Threshing varies from region to region. Methods include beating the straw to extract the grain, or trampling the straw to extract the seeds. Afterwards the grains have to be dried, usually over the period of a few days. The crop has very small seeds surrounded by hard kernels, so its grains are ground into a fine powder before being used in cooking.

On the other hand, Digitaria exilis has some implications for its ability to be a crop candidate. One thing the crop struggles with is in competing with weeds. Farmers are therefore required to remove weeds after sowing. Another issue is that after planting Digitaria exilis, the fields require time to recover soil nutrients. Usually the field has to left fallow for 1–2 years after harvest. These are some of the qualities that need improvement and whose improvement can be achieved through artificial selection.

Digitaria exilis is the oldest native cereal crop in West Africa, first harvested around 5 millennia BC. Digitaria exilis is vital for food security in the region. Farmers emphasize the crop's culinary value, its short growth cycle, high productivity and medium size. However, due to a lack of harvesting and processing technology, it is difficult to maintain the crop's genetic diversity or establish large-scale production. With that in mind, it is important to maintain and develop fonio for both producers and consumers. Digitaria exilis has many potential future uses in cooking or as technological feedstock so it is necessary to select for good kernel properties to develop it into a new crop for the world.

== Uses ==
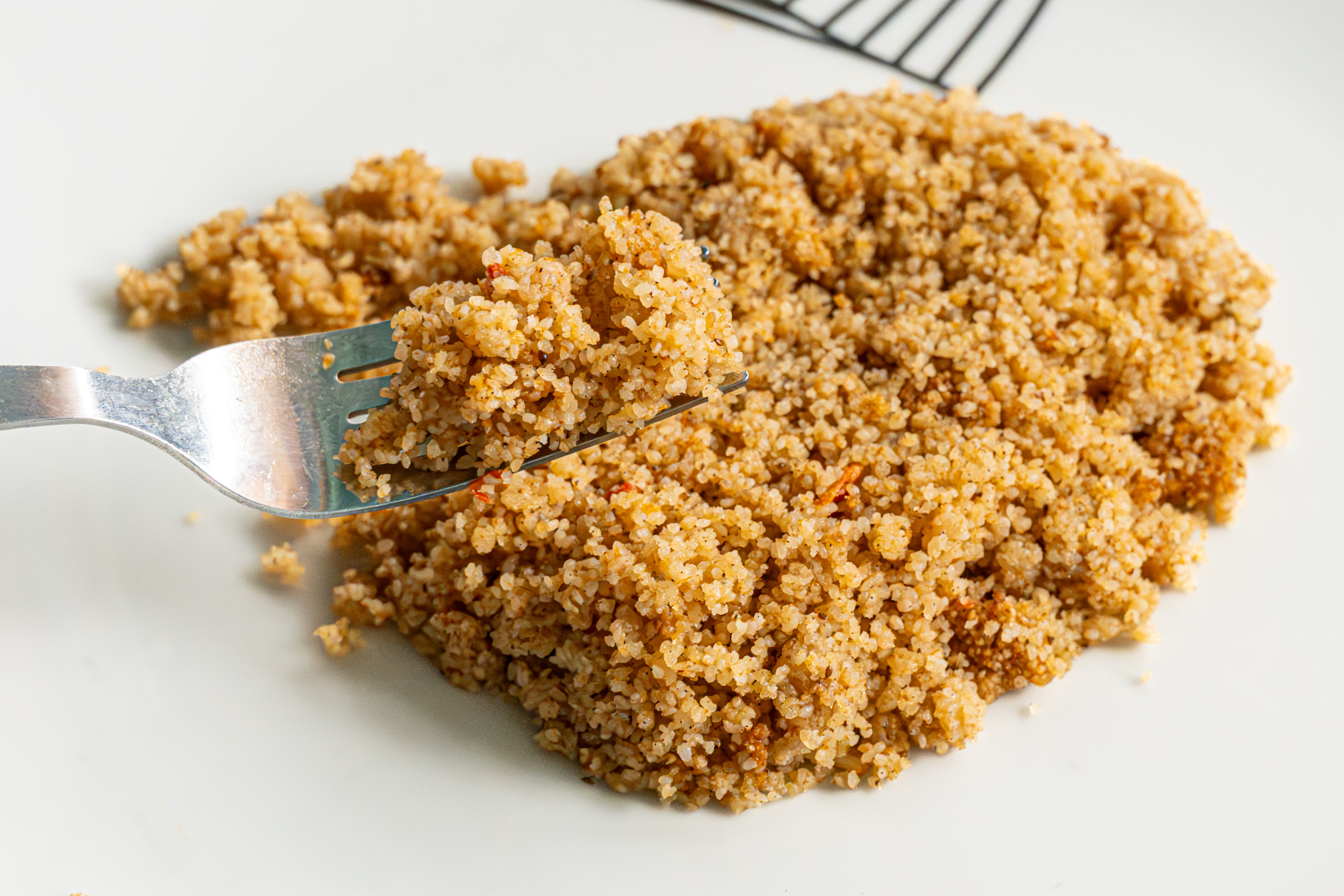
Fonio couscous served at the Restaurant du Fonio in Natitingou, Benin

Digitaria exilis is an important part of cooking in West Africa, traditionally used for porridges and steamed cooked foods. The species is known to have high levels of carbohydrate and protein. These protein levels are seen with D. exilis being rich in essential amino acids such as methionine compared to other cereals such as wheat, rice and maize. These qualities show that D. exilis could be a good food source, and that if the right characters are chosen, it could turn into a useful crop.

It can be used to make couscous, bread, and beer.

Despite its valuable characteristics and widespread cultivation, fonio has generally received limited research and development attention, which is also why the species is sometimes referred to as an underutilized crop.

=== Nutrition ===
Digitaria exilis holds high nutritional value to humans. The nutritional value of hulled fonio is about 1470 kJ and for whitened fonio 1430 kJ per 100 gram.

It contains methionine and cysteine, two amino acids that are important to human survival. These two amino acids, however, are lacking in wheat, rice, maize, and other cereal crops. Moving from the amino acid level to the macromolecule level, D. exilis, compared to other cereal crops, has greater protein, carbohydrate, and fiber content. Digitaria exilis has more protein and fiber content than rice. Additionally, D. exilis has more carbohydrate content than millet, sorghum, and maize. Therefore, the nutritional benefit from D. exilis outweighs the nutritional benefits from other similar cereal crops.

There are several factors that can alter this pre-existing high nutritional content. One method that distorts the nutritional composition of D. exilis is the extensive processing required to bring it to an edible state. During milling, the outer layers of its grains are removed, and these layers are where the nutrients are primarily located. Therefore, with the loss of the outer layers of the grains, there is a loss in the nutrient content. As a result, the iron, zinc, and phytate concentrations present in the edible form of D. exilis are reduced in abundance relative to their respective concentrations before processing.

Fonio is closer to sorghum and rice than to wheat and thus does not contain the sequence of amino acids that cause gluten intolerance.

Nutritional value of D. exilis compared with other cereals
	Carbohydrates	Lipids	Proteins	Minerals
Hulled Fonio	84-86	3.3- 3.8	9- 11	1- 1.1
Whitened Fonio	89- 91	0.8- 1.0	7- 9	0.3- 0.6
Rice	86	2.5	10	1.4
Whitened Rice	90	0.9	8	0.5

=== Mineral content ===
D. exilis shows generally mineral contents that are in the range of other cereals. However, it contains much more sulphur than other cereals. Furthermore, the sulphur concentrates primarily in the grain rather than the husk as with other cereals. This leads to D. exilis containing twice as much methionine—a sulphur compound—as corn or millet, and three times as much as rice does. Some of the minerals are concentrated in the husk, which is lost during the hulling process. The remaining fatty acids in the hulled grain are mainly unsaturated fats like linoleic and oleic acid. The most present saturated fat is palmitic acid. It has been reported that D. exilis is an optimal food for people having diabetic problems.

Macro and Microelements of D. exilis
	Hulled Fonio	Whitened Fonio
Macroelements (In % dry weight)
Calcium (Ca)	0.022	0.01
Magnesium (Mg)	0.13	0.01
Phosphorus (P)	0.25	0.06
Potassium (K)	0.17	0.02
Sulphur (S)	0.16	0.16
Microelements (ppm)
Copper (Cu)	6.8	3.0
Iron (Fe)	38.8	27.3
Manganese (Mn)	21.6	4.9
Sodium (Na)	72.3	58.5
Zinc (Zn)	33.4	21.8

=== Effect of agricultural practice on nutrition ===
The nutrient content and yield of D. exilis can be affected by the soil nutrition present in the varying climatic conditions of West Africa, which is where D. exilis primarily grows. Through experimentation, it was seen that the nitrogen concentration in the soil has the greatest effect on the nutrition and productivity of D. exilis. When nitrogen was added to the soil in limited quantities with an excess of potassium and phosphorus, productivity of D. exilis increased by 22%. Such significant results were not observed, however, when either potassium or phosphorus was added to the soil with excess nitrogen and phosphorus, or with excess nitrogen and potassium, respectively. On the contrary, when nitrogen, phosphorus, and potassium were added to the soil in equal and moderate quantities, the greatest amount of yield and nutrition was seen. This overall trend is seen as a result of the low rainfall and poor soil conditions that D. exilis naturally grows in.

Additionally, farmers evaluated D. exilis landraces on key agricultural characteristics. These included ease of processing, productivity, grain size, and facility of harvesting among many others. Based on the evaluations given by these farmers, it can be seen that the agronomic traits (traits that allow for a greater ease of growing to farmers) of D. exilis would be having a big and long stem, having a long panicle with many grains, and having a large grain size. These traits allow for easier growing and harvesting by farmers.

From an evolutionary biology standpoint, information about the nutritional content of D. exilis, factors that modify its nutritional content, and its agronomically important traits can be of importance under artificial selection of D. exilis. The D. exilis landraces that exhibit the greatest amount of nutrition and display the agriculturally important qualities can be further cultivated under improvement. As a result, D. exilis can serve as a perennial crop to provide the human species with food security in the future.

WWF and Knorr in a joint study, dated February 2019, name D. exilis as one of the "50 future foods for healthier people and a healthier planet". WWF and the multinational Unilever (Knorr) teamed up to launch a campaign to raise awareness of the 50 Future Foods which people should eat more of in order to help reduce the environmental impact of food productions and to improve human health; D. exilis has been identified as one of those ingredients.

==== Volatile compounds ====
One of the things that makes Digitaria exilis such a sought after grain is its chemical composition. Digitaria exilis is an important source of nutrition because it is rich in methionine, which is an amino acid that is vital to human health. Since D. exilis was such an important part of people's nutrition, researchers wanted to find out what made it taste so good. Volatile compounds were used to determine what contributed to the flavor of D. exilis. It was found that D. exilis contains several amino acids that readily react with monosaccharides to form alkylpyrazines. There were three types of volatiles: those formed from starch degradation, those formed from reactions between starch and proteins, and those formed through lipid oxidation.

==== Physicochemical properties ====
One of the things that makes D. exilis unique is its physicochemical properties. The physicochemical properties of D. exilis can differ depending on if its starch is natural or succinylated. The pH of succinylated D. exilis is lower than that of natural D. exilis. This could be because some of the molecules introduced by succinylation resembled those of acetylation. While succinylation does decrease the pH of starch, it can increase some of its properties such as bulk density and water absorption capacity. The difference in bulk density is caused by the particle size decreasing as the bulk density increases. Succinylation increases the water absorption capacity of the starch which indicates that it could be helpful in some food products such as dough.

== See also ==
- Digitaria compacta, raishan, used as a grain crop in northeast India
- Digitaria iburua, black fonio, used as a crop in West Africa
- Digitaria sanguinalis, considered a weed around the world, but traditionally used as a grain crop in Europe
- Digitaria longiflora, its wild progenitor
