= Alice P. Albright =

American government official (born 1961)

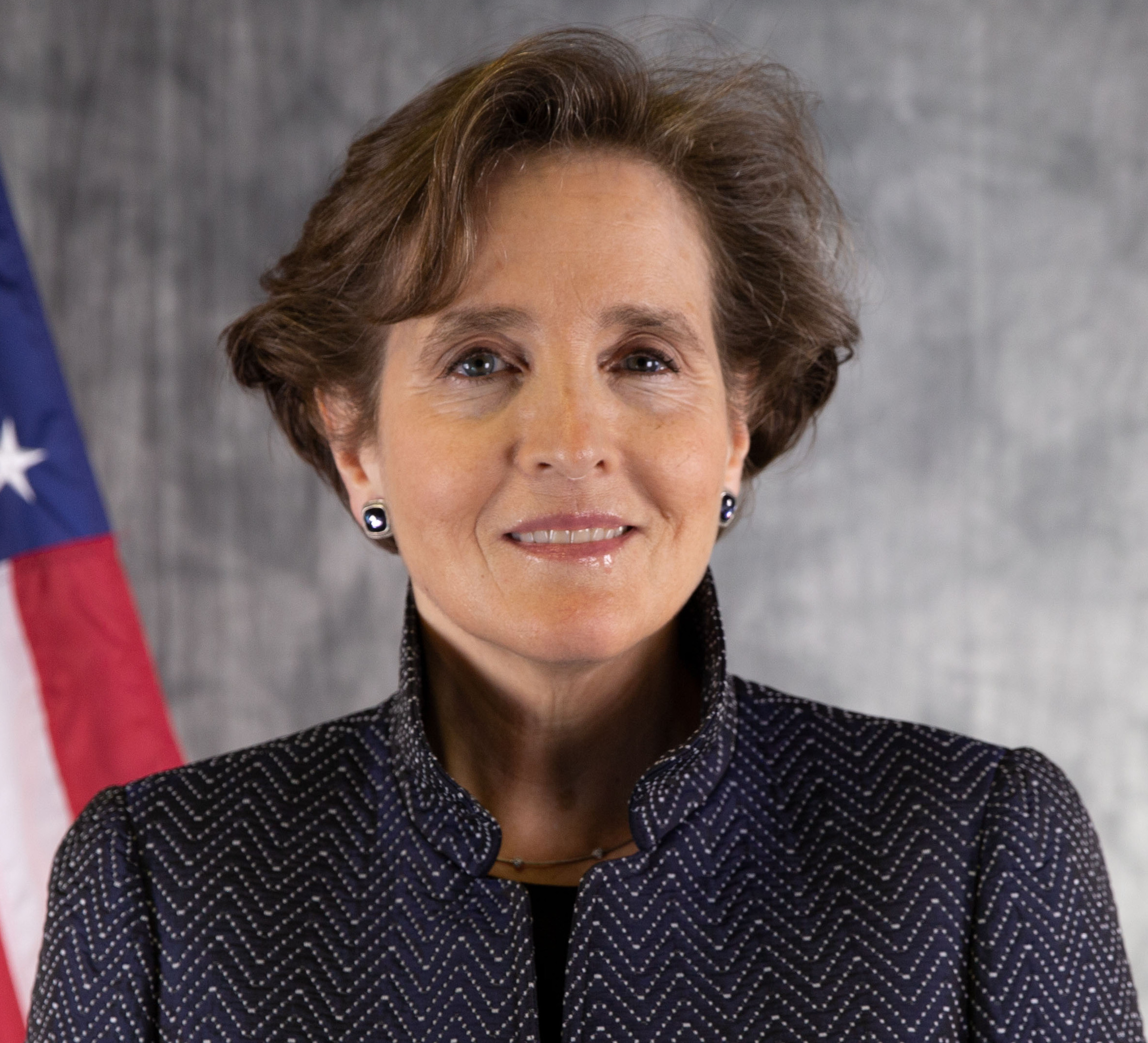
- Official portrait, 2022

CEO of the Millennium Challenge Corporation
- In office February 16, 2022 – January 20, 2025
- President: Joe Biden
- Preceded by: Sean Cairncross

Personal details
- Born: Alice Patterson Albright; 1961 (age 64–65)
- Parent(s): Madeleine Albright; Joseph Albright
- Education: Williams College (BA); Columbia University (MIA)

Alice Patterson Albright (born 1961) is an American government official who was the CEO of the Millennium Challenge Corporation from 2022 to 2025.

== Early life and education ==
Albright is a daughter of former United States Secretary of State Madeleine Albright. Her grandfather, Josef Korbel, was Czechoslovakia's ambassador to Yugoslavia, chairman of the United Nations Commission for India and Pakistan, and a political scientist at the University of Denver, where he founded the Josef Korbel School of International Studies. Her father, Joseph Albright, was a journalist and grandson of newspaper magnate Joseph Medill Patterson, who founded New York Daily News. She is a descendent of Joseph Medill, who owned the Chicago Tribune and had been elected mayor of Chicago and is the namesake of Northwestern University's Medill School of Journalism.

She received her MIA from Columbia University's School of International and Public Affairs and her BA from Williams College.

== Career ==
Albright held a variety of positions in Citicorp, Bankers Trust Company, JP Morgan, and the Carlyle Group prior to entering the nonprofit sector.

From 2001 to 2009, she was the chief financial and investment officer for the Global Alliance for Vaccines and Immunization, where she worked on enhancing immunization services in the poorest countries.

From 2009 to 2013, Albright was executive vice president and chief operating officer of the Export-Import Bank of the United States.

In 2013, Albright joined the Global Partnership for Education as CEO.

=== MCC nomination ===
On August 6, 2021, President Joe Biden nominated Albright to be CEO of the Millennium Challenge Corporation. Hearings were held by the Senate Foreign Relations Committee on her nomination on December 14, 2021. The committee favorably reported the nomination to the Senate floor on January 12, 2022. Her nomination was confirmed by the United States Senate via voice vote on February 7, 2022.

On 23 May 2024, Albright was among the guests invited to the state dinner hosted by President Biden in honor of President William Ruto at the White House.
