= Digitaria longiflora =

Scientific classification
- Kingdom: Plantae
- Clade: Tracheophytes
- Clade: Angiosperms
- Clade: Monocots
- Clade: Commelinids
- Order: Poales
- Family: Poaceae
- Subfamily: Panicoideae
- Genus: Digitaria
- Species: D. longiflora

Binomial name
- Digitaria longiflora (Retz.) Pers.

Species of grass

Digitaria longiflora is a species of crabgrass. It is the wild progenitor of the West African domesticated crop Digitaria exilis.
