= Eugenia Date-Bah =

Ghanaian academic and author

- Born: Eugenia Date-Bah; Accra, Ghana
- Occupations: Academic and Author
- Known for: Author

Eugenia Date-Bah was a Ghanaian academic and author. She was a member of the Sociology department of the University of Ghana. She was elected fellow of the Ghana Academy of Arts and Sciences in 2005. Date-Bah once served as the Director of InFocus, an International Labour Organization programme that focused on crises response and reconstruction, she also once served as the manager of the International Labour Organization's Action Programme for equipping countries emerging from armed conflicts with skills and entrepreneurial training.

== Personal life ==
Eugenia Date-Bah is the wife of Samuel Kofi Date-Bah, a jurist.

== Works ==
- Female and Male Factory Workers in Accra (in Christine Oppong's Female and Male in West Africa), (1982);
- Sustainable Peace After War: Arguing the Need for Major Development in Conflict programming, (1996);
- Jobs After War: A Critical Challenge in the Peace and Reconstruction Puzzle, (2003);
- Lest We Forget: Insights Into the Kenya's Post Election Violence (with Rita Njau, Rosabelle Boswell), (2008).
