= Global Partnership for Education =

Programme of the World Bank

- Founded: 2002
- Headquarters: Washington, D.C.
- President: Jakaya Kikwete
- Key people: Julia Gillard, Alice Albright, Laura Frigenti
- Website: www.globalpartnership.org

The Global Partnership for Education (GPE) is a multi-stakeholder partnership that aims to strengthen global education. Hosted by the World Bank, GPE is the world's only partnership dedicated solely to funding education in developing countries.

== History ==
Launched in 2002, the Global Partnership for Education was originally known as Education for All – Fast Track Initiative. It was launched to accelerate progress towards the Millennium Development Goal of universal primary education by 2015. In 2013, Alice P. Albright joined as Chief Executive Officer and Julia Gillard, former Australian Prime Minister, was appointed Chair of GPE's Board. In 2016, Rihanna became GPE's first Global Ambassador. In 2021, ahead of the G7 Summit, President of the European Commission Ursula von der Leyen announced that the European Union would pledge €700 million for the Global Partnership for Education. In 2023, President Jakaya Kikwete was named the first African President of the GPE Board of Directors. Since 2002, there are 77 million more children in school in GPE partner countries and US$5.3 billion in grants have been allocated since 2003, including US$2.4 billion to partner countries affected by fragility and conflict.

== Members ==
Partner countries include Afghanistan, Albania, Algeria, Angola, Bangladesh, Belize, Benin, Bhutan, Bolivia, Burkina Faso, Burundi, Cabo Verde, Cambodia, Cameroon, Central African Republic, Chad, Comoros, Congo, Democratic Republic of Congo, Republic of Côte d'Ivoire, Djibouti, Dominica, Egypt, El Salvador, Eritrea, Eswatini, Ethiopia, Fiji, The Gambia, Georgia, Ghana, Grenada, Guatemala, Guinea, Guinea-Bissau, Guyana, Haiti, Honduras, India, Indonesia, Jordan, Kenya, Kiribati, Kyrgyz Republic, Lao PDR, Lebanon, Lesotho, Liberia, Madagascar, Malawi, Maldives, Mali, Marshall Islands, Mauritania, FS Micronesia, Moldova, Mongolia, Morocco, Mozambique, Myanmar, Nepal, Nicaragua, Niger, Nigeria, Pakistan, Papua New Guinea, Philippines, Rwanda, Saint Lucia, Saint Vincent and the Grenadines, Samoa, São Tomé and Príncipe, Senegal, Sierra Leone, Solomon Islands, Somalia, South Sudan, Sri Lanka, Sudan, Syria, Tajikistan, Tanzania, Timor-Leste, Togo, Tonga, Tunisia, Tuvalu, Uganda, Ukraine, Uzbekistan, Vanuatu, Vietnam, West Bank and Gaza, Yemen, Zambia, and Zimbabwe.
