= Josefina Pitra Diakité =

Diplomat

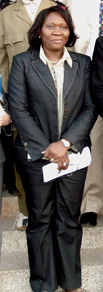
- Josefina Pitra Diakité in 2007

Ambassador of Angola to Sweden
- In office 1993–2000
- Preceded by: Garcia Vaz Contreiras
- Succeeded by: Leovigildo da Costa e Silva

Angolan Ambassador to the United States
- In office March 23, 2001 appointed, June 20, 2001 letter of credentials – September 1, 2011
- Preceded by: António Franca
- Succeeded by: Alberto do Carmo Bento Ribeiro

Angolan Ambassador to South Africa
- In office June 7, 2011 – October 2017
- Preceded by: es:Manuel Domingos Augusto; 1997 Pedro Fernando Mavunza residence en (Gaborone)(Botswana); 2005-2010:Miguel Neto

Josefina Perpétua Pitra Diakité was the ambassador of Angola to South Africa from 2011 until 2017. She was the ambassador of Angola to the United States from 2001 to September 1, 2011.

Her successor as ambassador to the United States is Alberto do Carmo Bento Ribeiro, since 2011.
