= Diaryatou Bah =

Guinean Women's rights activist

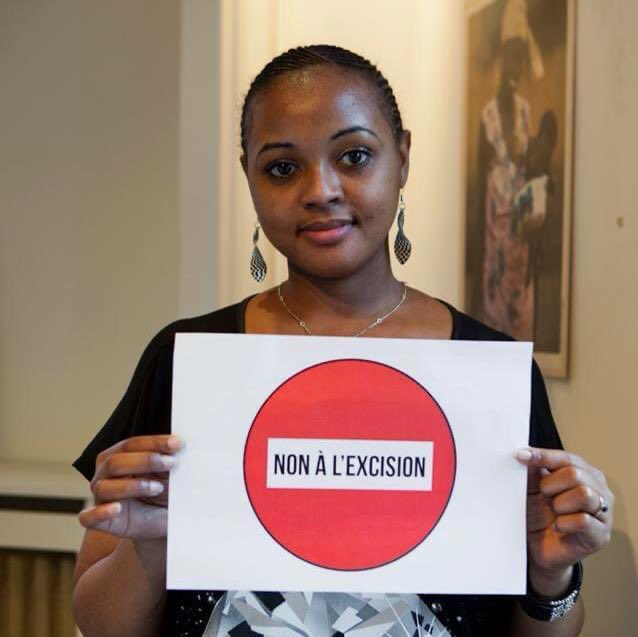
- Born: 1985 (age 40–41); Guinea
- Occupations: Secular and feminist activist, against female genital mutilation and forced marriage
- Organization: Espoirs et Combats des femmes

Diaryatou Bah (born 1985) is a feminist and secular activist from Guinea.

Based in France, she is the founder of the organization Espoirs et Combats des femmes ("Women's Hopes and Struggles"), which opposes female genital mutilation and violence against women. She also works with the organizations Excision, parlons-en ! ("Excision, Let's Talk About It!") and Ni Putes Ni Soumises (Neither Whores nor Submissives).

In 2018, she received the Elles de France prize for courage, in recognition of her work against female genital mutilation.

== Early life ==
Diaryatou Bah was born in Guinea in 1985. She is from a large family of 32 children, the daughter of a polygamous father with four wives. She spent her childhood in the small village of Sakilé, raised by her grandmother in a community of women until she was 10 years old.

She was 8 years old when she was subjected to female genital mutilation in 1993. On the death of her grandmother, Bah rejoined her father and his three other spouses in Conakry. At age 13, she was forced to marry a 45-year-old man living in Amsterdam, so she left Guinea to live with her husband in Europe. A regular victim of marital rape and other forms of intimate partner violence, she had three miscarriages (becoming pregnant for the first time at age 14). The couple moved to the Paris region in 2003, and her tourist visa expired, leaving her at the mercy of her husband. But while he was traveling to Africa to visit another of his wives, she watched a television program that featured the testimony of a woman who had escaped a forced marriage. This inspired her to ask for help at the town hall of Les Lilas, where she was living.

After her husband returned, she decided to leave him. The Aide sociale à l'enfance, France's child welfare system, took over her care, and she was placed in youth housing known as a foyer de jeunes travailleurs and was able to learn French.

She obtained a residence permit in 2005, and French citizenship in 2014.

== Activism ==
At age 20, she became fully aware of the significance of her excision, and in 2006 she published her autobiography On m'a volé mon enfance ("I Was Robbed of My Childhood"). Recalling the woman's testimony that led to her escape from her forced marriage, Bah felt she wanted to share her own testimony.

That same year, she founded her organization, Espoirs et Combats des femmes ("Women's Hopes and Struggles"). Its aim is to fight against female genital mutilation and violence against women. Bah says that the organization's Facebook page receives many messages from young African women who identify with her story and ask for advice. At the same time, Bah became an educator in a social integration center with the nonprofit organization Aurore, working in prisons, notably Fleury-Mérogis, to educate inmates about violence against women.

In 2008, she launched an education campaign in Guinea, where, according to UNICEF, 97% of girls are subject to genital mutilation. In 2011, she was put in charge of a committee of the organization Ni Putes Ni Soumises on the emancipation of women in France. She also became active in campaigns for secularism.

In the years that followed, Bah participated in the work of the organization Excision, parlons-en ! ("Excision, Let's Talk About It!") and became an ambassador for the campaign Alerte excision ("Excision Alert"), intended to warn teenage girls of the risk of female genital mutilation that may come with visiting their parents' home countries. Education is at the center of her activism, as learning to read was a crucial step in her autonomy.

In 2022, Bah was elected as a local councillor in Romainville.

== Recognition ==
In October 2018, in recognition of her fight against female genital mutilation, she received the Elles de France prize for courage from the president of the Île-de-France region, Valérie Pécresse. On receiving the honor, Bah said:

"Thank you to all of the volunteers, activists, social workers. Yes, I am a feminist activist. I have walked a path of fear and shame. Being here today gives me the strength to continue the fight. Illiteracy kills women. It was by learning to read and write that I was able to become an emancipated woman."

In 2022, she was named a Knight in the Ordre national du Mérite.
