= Ba Kaung =

- ဘကောင်း
- Born: 1921; Shwebo, British Burma
- Died: 8 July 2003 (aged 81–82); Yangon, Myanmar

Ba Kaung (Burmese: ဘကောင်း, 1921 - 8 July 2003) was a Burmese activist. He was one of the most prominent student activists of post-independent Burma. In 1957, he established the Progressive Student Force along with fellow activists, a rival union of the government-backed Democratic Student Organization and also served as a leader for the Communist Party of Burma.

He went on to join the civil service as a government high school teacher in the 1960s. Ba Kaung was also an editor of the semi-government-run Pyinnya Tansaung magazine in the 1990s.
