= Hadja Idrissa Bah =

Guinean activist (born 1999)

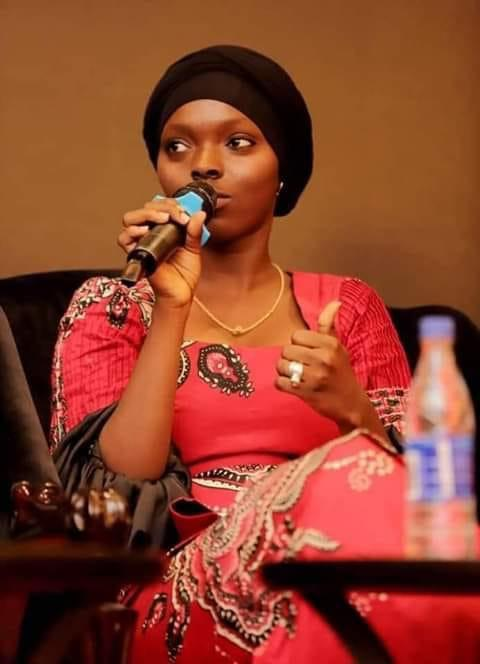
- Bah in 2019
- Born: August 23, 1999 (age 27); Conakry, Guinea
- Citizenship: Guinea
- Education: University of General Lansana Conté
- Occupation: Activist
- Organization: Guinea Girl Leaders Club

Hadja Idrissa Bah, also Hadja Idy (born 23 August 1999) is a child's rights and women's rights activist from Guinea, who was elected President of the Guinean Children's Parliament in 2016. She has advised President Emmanuel Macron on women's issues.

== Biography ==
Bah was born on 23 August 1999. Her parents, a shopkeeper and a cleaner, supported her wish to complete her secondary studies at the Saint Georges High School in Conakry. She studied political science for a year at the University of General Lansana Conté (fr), before enrolling in the law faculty at the Sorbonne University Association.

== Activism ==
In 2016, Bah was elected President of the Guinean Children's Parliament. As President, she demanded that Guinean decision-makers respect children's rights: "The rights of the Guinean child are in an alarming situation, because they are neglected." She is particularly involved in the fight against female genital mutilation, deploring on this subject that "false religious beliefs weigh more than the law". During her presidency she was outspoken on many issues, including: against teen marriage; sexual and domestic violence; rape; the stigma against female sexuality. Bah was first elected to the parliament aged 13.

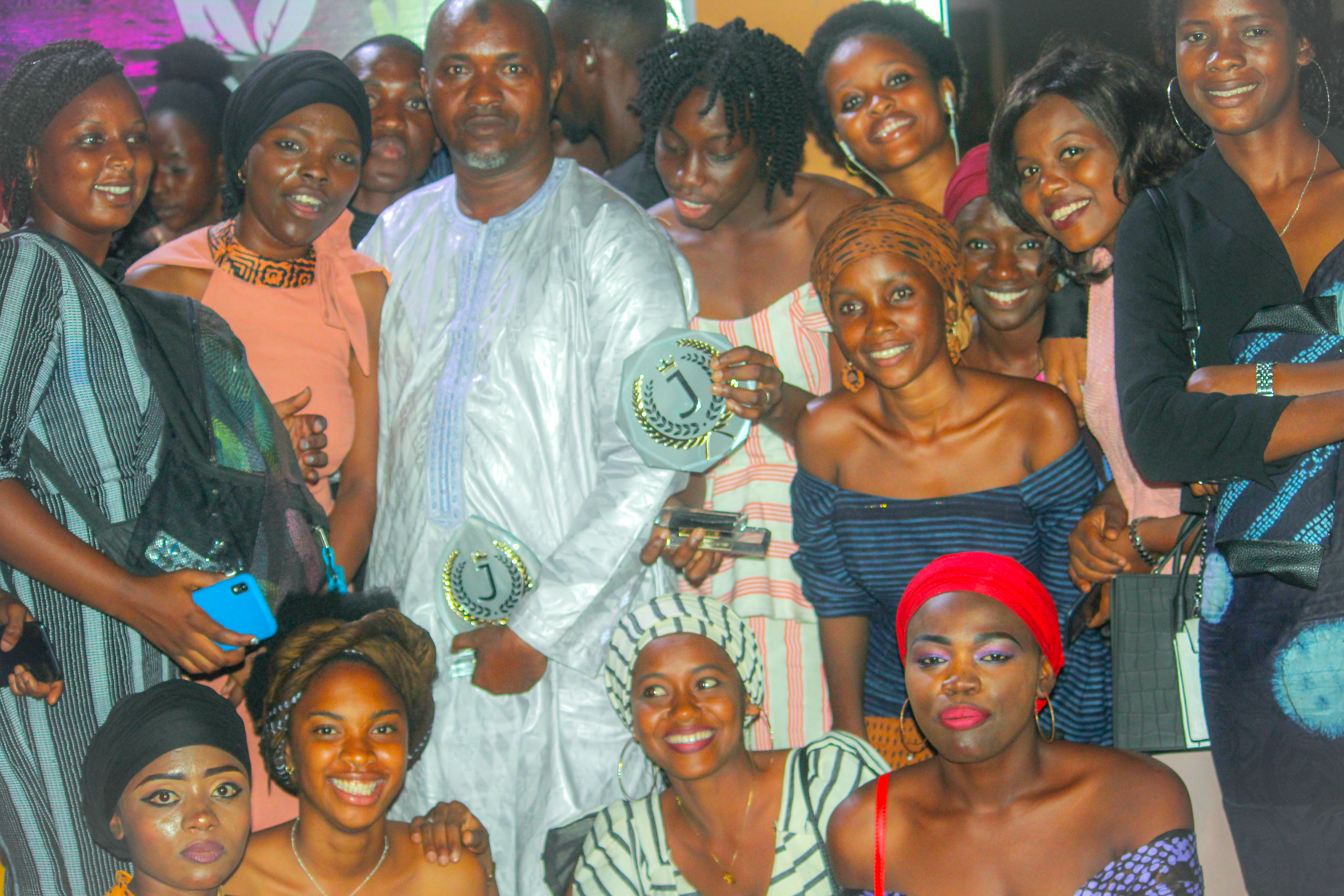
Guinea Girl Leaders Club, 2019 at the J Awards

In 2016, she founded the Guinea Girl Leaders Club, which recognises the particular burdens that girls and young women face in Guinean society. The organisation seeks to educate young women who might be tempted to marry at a very young age to think twice before agreeing. The group discourages parents who are encouraging their daughters to marry at a young age. It also leads campaigns against female genital mutilation, with a particular focus on the school summer holidays — a time at which many young women are mutilated.

In 2019, Bah was selected as one of fifty-seven young French-speaking people from around the world who congregated for the LabCitoyen programme to discuss women's rights and equality. On 2 March 2020 she was invited by French President Emmanuel Macron to discuss women's rights, along with the Executive Director of UN Women Phumzile Mlambo-Ngcuka, the Syrian novelist Samar Yazbek and the former Swedish foreign minister and European commissioner Margot Wallström and other notable women's rights activists.

== Awards ==
- Guinean Senate: Women's Rights Delegation Award (2019).
- The J Awards (fr): Super Award (2019).
