= Youssouf Sambo Bâ =

Burkinabé politician

Youssouf Sambo Bâ (born May 10, 1942 in Boborgou, Niger) is a Burkinabé politician and retired teacher. He is the President of the Party for Democracy and Socialism.

== Career ==
Bâ was headmaster of Collège d'Enseignement Général in Bobo-Dioulasso from 1974 to 1977.

On January 7, 1983 Bâ was named Cabinet Director of the Ministry of National Education, Arts and Culture, by the ruling CSP junta.

Sambo Bâ was elected to the National Assembly in the May 2007 parliamentary election as a candidate on the PDS national list. He was one of only two PDS candidates to win a seat.
