= Amadou Ba (disambiguation) =

Amadou Ba (born 1961) is a Senegalese politician who served as prime minister from 2022 to 2024.

Amadou Ba, or Amadou Bâ, may also refer to:

- Amadou Ba (artist) (born 1945), Senegalese painter
- Amadou Bâ (politician, born 1892) (1892–1967), also known as Doudou Ba, Senegalese politician, adjunct to the mayor of Dakar
- Amadou Ba (basketball), basketball coach in the Burkina Faso men's national basketball team, 2017–
- Amadou Ba (footballer) (born 1998), French football forward for La Louvière
- Amadou Dia Ba (born 1958), former Senegalese athlete
- Amadou Hampâté Bâ (c. 1901–1991), Malian writer and ethnologist
- Amadou Ba-Sy (born 2001), French football striker for Dunkerque
- Shaikh Amadou Ba (c. 1830–1875), a 19th century cleric and self-proclaimed Mahdi

== See also ==
- Amadou Onana (born 1991) full name Amadou Ba Zeund Georges Mvom Onana, Belgian professional footballer
