= Marisol Pérez Lizaur =

Mexican social anthropologist (1994–2024)

Marisol Pérez Lizaur (December 17, 1994 – February 8, 2024) was a Mexican social anthropologist. Her research focused on kinship, business networks, and social organization in Mexico. She worked as a professor and researcher at Universidad Iberoamericana and collaborated with various academic institutions in Latin America.

== Early life and education ==
Marisol Pérez Lizaur was born in Mexico City on December 17, 1994. She studied at Universidad Iberoamericana, where she later became a professor and researcher.

== Career and research ==
Throughout her career, she focused on understanding how family relationships influence business and economic structures. She also explored how technology has changed the way companies function and organize themselves.

She collaborated with various academic institutions in Latin America and worked with other specialists in family and business networks. Her research provided insights into how personal connections shape economic development and access to power.

Pérez Lizaur studied family and business dynamics. She analyzed how kinship networks influence economic and organizational structures. Throughout her career, she contributed studies on the interaction between society, economy, and technology. One of her best-known works was A Mexican Elite Family, 1820–1980, written with Larissa Adler Lomnitz. This book examines the relationship between family structure and economic mobility in Mexico.

She also studied how technology has changed the way companies are organized and operate. She analyzed how influential families in Latin America use personal connections to maintain their position in society and the economy. Her work helps us better understand how these networks affect business development and access to power.

== Legacy ==
Pérez Lizaur’s research has served as a reference for studies in Social Anthropology, especially in the analysis of family and business networks. Her contributions have been cited in various studies on economic and organizational structures.
