= Ba Giai and Tú Xuất =

Ba Giai and Tú Xuất are a fictional duo appearing in Northern Vietnam's popular folk tales. The two characters are typically nominally citizens under the early French colonial period, but stories may place them in earlier dynasties or later.

The stories fall under the genre of Vietnamese comic or joke stories (vi:Truyện cười Việt Nam). The moral of the tale often concerns characterisation of the generous and stingy. During and after the independence struggle the moral of the tales may also take anti-colonial motifs. Their tales are the base of various television, theatre, film and animation productions.

== See also ==
- vi:Ba Giai
- vi:Tú Xuất
