= Millennium Challenge Corporation =

American government foreign aid agency

- Seal

- Logo

Agency overview
- Formed: January 2004
- Headquarters: Washington, D.C., U.S.
- Employees: ~300 (2011)
- Annual budget: $830 million (FY 2026)
- Agency executive: Vacant, Chief Executive Officer
- Website: www.mcc.gov

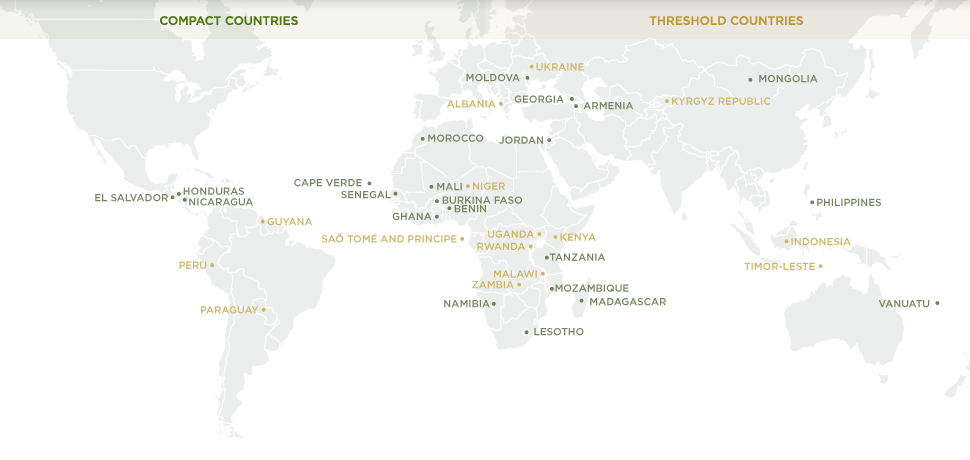
Partner countries as of May 2011. Countries in green have active compacts; countries in orange have active threshold compacts.

The Millennium Challenge Corporation (MCC) is a bilateral United States foreign aid agency established by the U.S. Congress in 2004. It is an independent agency separate from the State Department and USAID. It provides grants to countries that have been determined to have good economic policies and potential for economic growth. The country qualification process is objective, involving scores provided by third parties in 20 different areas. An eligible country must apply for a grant with a specific project in mind.

== History ==
At the Inter-American Development Bank meeting on March 14, 2002, President George W. Bush called for a new compact for development with accountability for both rich and poor countries. He pledged to increase development assistance by 50% by fiscal year 2006 (which, by the end of 2004, doubled and was to double again by 2010). Other development programs like USAID have been thought to suffer from many different and sometimes conflicting goals, which often are a result of political pressures, and for not delivering long-term economic improvements.

MCC was authorized in 2004 with bipartisan support. Its guiding principles are:

- Competitive selection: Before a country can become eligible to receive assistance, MCC's Board examines its performance on 20 policy indicators and selects compact-eligible countries based on policy performance.
- Country-led solutions: MCC requires selected countries to identify their priorities for achieving sustainable economic growth and poverty reduction. Countries develop their MCC proposals in broad consultation within their society. MCC teams then work in close partnership to help countries refine a program.
- Country-led implementation: MCC administers the Millennium Challenge Account (MCA). When a country is awarded a compact, it sets up its own local MCA accountable entity to manage and oversee all aspects of implementation. Monitoring of funds is rigorous and transparent, often through independent fiscal agents.

== Leadership ==
The first CEO of the Millennium Challenge Corporation was Paul V. Applegarth, a finance manager with experience in emerging markets. Applegarth was followed by John Danilovich, a business executive who had served as the U.S. Ambassador to Costa Rica from 2001 to 2004 and then U.S. Ambassador to Brazil. On November 20, 2009, Daniel W. Yohannes, an Ethiopian-born American business person, was confirmed by the Senate as the CEO. He was appointed in May 2014 as US Ambassador to the OECD and succeeded by Dana Hyde who was CEO through January 2017. Sean Cairncross was confirmed as CEO under the Trump administration in June 2019 after four acting CEOs. In January 2021 Mahmoud Bah became Millennium Challenge Corporation Acting CEO. On February 16, 2022, Alice P. Albright was sworn in as CEO. She left on January 20, 2025.

=== Board of directors ===
The board of directors is composed of nine members, four appointed by the president of the United States with the consent of the United States Senate and five ex officio members. The five ex officio members are the U.S. secretary of state, the secretary of the treasury, the administrator of the United States Agency for International Development, the CEO of the MCC, and the U.S. trade representative. Of the four appointed members, one each shall be appointed from lists of individuals with relevant international experience submitted by the minority and majority leaders of the House of Representatives and Senate, respectively. These four each serve initial terms of three years, and may be reappointed to one additional term of two years. They may continue to serve after the expiration of each of their terms of office until a successor has been confirmed, for a maximum of one year.

The secretary of state serves as the chairperson of the board. A majority of the members of the board constitutes a quorum, which must include at least one of the four appointed members.

=== Board members ===
The board members as of May 24, 2026:

Position	Name	Party	Assumed office	Term expiration
Chair (ex officio) Secretary of State	Marco Rubio	Republican	January 21, 2025	—N/a
Vice chair (ex officio) Secretary of the Treasury	Scott Bessent	Republican	January 28, 2025	—N/a
Member (ex officio) Administrator of USAID	Vacant		—	—N/a
Member (ex officio) CEO of the MCC	Vacant		—	—N/a
Member (ex officio) U.S. Trade Representative	Jamieson Greer	Republican	February 27, 2025	—N/a
Member	Ander Crenshaw (Note: Crenshaw is still listed among the board members, even though the US Code implies that his seat should have been vacant from June 2023.)	Republican	June 5, 2019	June 5, 2022
Member	Vacant		—	—
Member	Vacant		—	—
Member	Vacant		—	—

=== Nominations ===
President Trump has nominated the following to fill seats on the board. They await Senate confirmation.

Position	Name	Party	Term expires	Replacing
CEO of the MCC	Elliott Hulse	Republican	—	Alice P. Albright

== Advisory councils ==
The Millennium Challenge Corporation has two federal advisory committees under the U.S. Federal Advisory Committee Act (FACA): the MCC Advisory Council and the Economic Advisory Council. The bodies give independent, non-binding advice to the corporation's leadership on strategic, policy and technical matters concerning international development, economic growth and MCC programmes.

Created in 2016, the MCC Advisory Council advises the corporation on partner countries' developments, private-sector engagement, infrastructure, sustainability and emerging trends in international development. The Council meets regularly and has recommended that more work be done with private sector partners, involve investors earlier in compact development, and build partnerships with institutional investors, philanthropic organisations and other non-traditional development partners.

In 2018, MCC announced the establishment of the Economic Advisory Council, which will support MCC's leadership and the Department of Policy and Evaluation with technical guidance on development economics and programme evaluation. It has worked on themes such as the link between economic growth and poverty alleviation, the private finance mobilisation through blended finance, and analytical approaches to regional compact development.

Senior executives, economists, investors, development practitioners from multinational corporations, financial institutions, universities, think tanks and international development organisations have served on the advisory councils. Some members of the MCC Advisory Council who have served in the past include Daniel F. Runde of the Center for Strategic and International Studies (CSIS); Stephen Groff, Governor of the National Development Fund of Saudi Arabia; Tariye Gbadegesin, Chief Executive Officer of ARM-Harith Infrastructure Investment Ltd; and Special Adviser to the President of Nigeria on Energy, Olu Verheijen.

== Selection indicators ==
A country is considered eligible for a compact (aid grant) if selected as eligible by the Board of Directors. The Board of Directors chooses countries based on three factors: policy performance as measured by the selection indicators on MCC's scorecard, the opportunity to reduce poverty in a country, and the availability of funds. In order to pass the scorecard a country must pass 10 of the 20 indicators, pass either the Political Rights or Civil Liberties Indicators, and pass the Control of Corruption indicator. For 16 of the 20 indicators, a country passes if its score exceeds the median score of its peer group. The remaining 4 indicators (Political Rights, Civil Liberties, Immunization Rates (if the median is above 90%, otherwise it is median based), and Inflation) are scored based on a static threshold.

All 20 indicators are compiled by third parties with no connection to MCC. MCC grants are made without considering politics. This is perhaps the most innovative aspect of MCC, as previous foreign aid missions were plagued by political considerations. The focus of the MCC is to promote economic growth in the recipient countries. The program emphasizes good economic policies in recipient countries, such as free markets and low corruption.

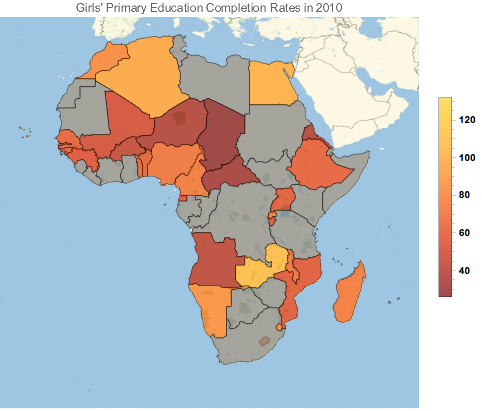
Girls' primary education completion rates for countries in Africa. Source data: MCC Open Data Catalog, FY 2014.

The indicators are:

Indicator	Category	Source
Civil liberties	Ruling justly	Freedom House
Political rights	Ruling justly	Freedom House
Freedom of Information	Ruling justly	Reporters Without Borders Centre for Law and Democracy Access Now
Government effectiveness	Ruling justly	World Bank Institute
Rule of law	Ruling justly	World Bank Institute
Control of corruption	Ruling justly	World Bank Institute
Immunization rate	Investing in people	World Health Organization
Public expenditure on health	Investing in people	World Health Organization
Girls' primary education completion rate / Girls' secondary education completion rate	Investing in people	UNESCO
Public expenditure on education	Investing in people	UNESCO and national sources
Natural resource protection	Investing in people	CIESIN/Yale
Child Health	Investing in people	CIESIN/Yale
Inflation rate	Economic freedom	International Monetary Fund WEO
Trade policy	Economic freedom	The Heritage Foundation
Land rights and access index	Economic freedom	IFAD / V-Dem Institute
Regulatory quality	Economic freedom	World Bank Institute
Fiscal policy	Economic freedom	IMF WEO
Access to Credit	Economic freedom	Findex, World Bank, IMF
Gender in the Economy	Economic freedom	Women, Business and the Law World Bank, UCLA
Employment Opportunity	Economic freedom	V-Dem Institute, UCLA

An eligible country must apply for a grant with a specific project in mind.

== Countries and country tools ==
Compact countries

- Armenia
- Benin
- Burkina Faso
- Cabo Verde
- Côte d'Ivoire
- El Salvador
- Georgia
- Ghana
- Honduras
- Indonesia
- Jordan
- Kosovo
- Lesotho
- Liberia
- Madagascar
- Malawi
- Mali
- Moldova
- Mongolia
- Morocco
- Mozambique
- Namibia
- Nepal
- Nicaragua
- Niger
- Philippines
- Senegal
- Sri Lanka
- Tanzania
- Timor Leste
- Tunisia
- Vanuatu
- Zambia

Threshold countries

- Albania
- Burkina Faso
- Ethiopia
- Guatemala
- Guyana
- Honduras
- Indonesia
- Jordan
- Kosovo
- Gambia
- Indonesia
- Kenya
- Kyrgyz Republic
- Liberia
- Malawi
- Moldova
- Niger
- Paraguay
- Peru
- Philippines
- Rwanda
- São Tomé and Príncipe
- Solomon Islands
- Tanzania
- Togo
- Timor Leste
- Uganda
- Ukraine
- Zambia

== MCC compacts and thresholds programs in recipient countries ==
MCC signs either a compact or a threshold agreement with a partner country. A compact is awarded if the country scores highly on the selection criteria indicators. If the country scores poorly but has a positive, upward trend on the selection criteria, it can still be eligible for a smaller grant, called a threshold program.

MCC requires that each partner government creates a special purpose legal entity that will be accountable for implementing the compact program.

== Eligible countries ==
In the first year (2004), 17 countries were made eligible for an MCC grant: Armenia, Benin, Bolivia, Cape Verde, El Salvador, Georgia, Ghana, Honduras, Lesotho, Madagascar, Mali, Mongolia, Morocco, Mozambique, Nicaragua, Senegal, Sri Lanka, and Vanuatu. Madagascar and Honduras were the first countries to receive actual funding from the MCA. On June 16, 2006, the Gambia was suspended, citing deterioration in 8 of the 16 criteria categories. Mali was approved in October 2006 for a $461 million program to develop modern irrigation systems and an industrial park. Jordan was granted full compact eligibility, despite objections from Freedom House for its lack of full political and civil rights. MPs in Uganda from the opposition party hailed their country's rejection from full compact status, demanding instead a stronger effort in stopping the corruption that disqualified their country. In June 2007, MCA-eligible countries in Africa held a meeting in Accra, Ghana, to discuss their experiences. Malawi qualified for a full compact in 2007, while Mauritania became threshold eligible.

=== Threshold eligible ===
Several countries were chosen in 2004 for a new part of the program called Threshold Program Assistance, which are smaller compacts used to assist a country close to meeting account eligibility to become eligible for a full program. Jordan received a Threshold program aimed at democracy and trade totaling $25 million. Yemen was previously eligible for a threshold agreement, but was suspended after their indicators fell too low to qualify. But having successfully completed a democratic election and various economic reforms, the MCC made Yemen eligible again for a threshold agreement. On December 12, 2007, the MCC Board selected Malawi for a compact and Mauritania for a threshold agreement, as well as allowing Albania, Paraguay, and Zambia to submit a first ever second stage threshold agreement. In 2007 the U.S. Ambassador to Swaziland highlighted the progress on the MCC indicators over the last few years and encouraged the country to work toward eligibility.

A full listing of MCC partner countries can be found at https://www.mcc.gov/where-we-work/. MCC's portfolio focuses mostly on African nations.

== Funding ==
Congress has consistently provided less funding for the program than the president has requested. In fiscal year 2004, $650 million were provided for the program, with an increase up to $1.5 billion the next year. For fiscal year 2007, $2 billion were provided, a 14% increase over the previous year but still under the $3 billion target. Again for fiscal year 2008, less funding will be provided than was hoped for, and only $1.2 billion was budgeted; the CEO of the MCC commented that it would undercut the program's efforts. Congress declined to re-authorize the program, which technically was not needed since the program had been authorized already, but also since there was argument over the authorization language. In discussions of the FY 2009 budget, the United States Senate proposed that only half of the money needed for a compact be provided up front, as opposed to full funding for each one provident in advance, which officials at the corporation insist would be a "large step backward" causing too little aid to make an impact on recipient countries. Senator Richard Lugar, the author of the amendment, responded that more "realistic" funding levels allowed for more compacts, thus spreading the "MCC effect". The amendment did not make it into the final bill. President Bush's FY 2008 budget requested $2.225 billion, the first time since the program's inception that the amount was not $3 billion, and enough money for five compacts, several threshold agreements and administrative funding.

== Reception and impact ==
=== Initial justification ===
Studies by conservative groups such as The Heritage Foundation in the United States have shown that many developing countries that have received foreign aid have seen their per capita income fall or stagnate over the last 40 years. The Heritage Foundation has consistently supported the MCC's approach, which has used their trade measure from the Index of Economic Freedom. In April 2005, the United States Government Accountability Office issued a favorable report about the work of the MCC and its work thus far. The Program Assessment Rating Tool (PART), which reviews the efficiency and results produced by U.S. government programs, was scheduled to be reviewed in 2007.

A study in 2006 looking at the "MCC effect" estimated that potential recipient countries improved 25% more on MCA's criteria than other countries, after controlling for time-trends. The World Policy Council, headed by Ambassador Horace Dawson and Senator Edward Brooke, recognizes the MCC as the most recent and most promising program in its area, and recommended that the Bush administration and the Congressional Black Caucus focus on full funding and an accelerated pace of spending. Doing Business 2007 cited the Millennium Challenge Accounts as a catalyst for reforms underway in 13 countries. Also, Freedom House released subcategories for the first time since it was being used as part of the MCC's measurements to allow for more granular distinctions. Also, the number of days it takes to start a business in low and low-middle income countries has decreased significantly since 2002, which is one of the factors the accounts measure since rapid business registration is thought to increase economic activity.

=== Subsequent impact ===
Since its inception, MCC has invested over $16 billion dollars in projects benefiting over 380 million people, including training nearly half a million farmers, creating over 7,000 kilometers of electrical lines and building thousands of roads. MCC has published over 190 studies on the effectiveness of its assistance in partner countries. Reviews of multiple studies on particular sectors have found some programs have had an impact on growth and poverty reduction, while others have had less impact than initially expected. Immediate outputs from the programs are more frequently attributed to MCC's assistance, while longer term impacts are often more difficult to connect directly MCC's programs.

More recent research has also been done into the "MCC Effect" and the relationship between MCC's Country Scorecards economic growth, and poverty reduction. Some studies have found evidence that countries do engage in policy reform in order to improve on MCC's scorecards. While others have demonstrated a connection between MCC's eligibility criteria and development outcomes for a country such as lower poverty. Some find that these relationships are independent of growth, with lower poverty rates in countries that have passed the MCC scorecard than those that fail it, even holding GDP constant.

=== Criticism ===
Some critics have charged that the program uses indicators by conservative groups, such as The Heritage Foundation, and is therefore biased toward free market economics and reimposing American imperialism on the Global South. The program is said to have resulted in countries receiving less funding from other U.S. government development organizations and not more. Some development agencies have felt frozen out of the process since the compact programs are designed primarily by the country involved. Implementation has been difficult in Armenia, and concern about its effectiveness has been expressed.

In February 2020, the Cabinet of Sri Lanka said it would not sign the proposed MCC agreement in its present form. A committee of experts had determined that it contained clauses incompatible with the Constitution of Sri Lanka and was "detrimental" to the country's sovereignty. After a board meeting on 15 December 2020, the MCC announced the cancelation of the proposed compact with Sri Lanka. The MCC and US officials claimed that Sri Lanka's refusal was the result of "Chinese disinformation". The MCC and the US Envoy to Nepal also claimed that China had conducted a "disinformation campaign" opposing the MCC's program in Nepal, although this compact proceeded.

== See also ==
- Millennium Challenge Corporation’s Nepal Compact
- Millennium Development Goals
- Title 22 of the Code of Federal Regulations
