= Asatu Bah Kenneth =

Liberian activist

Asatu Bah Kenneth is a Liberian activist, former Deputy Inspector General of the Liberian police and founder of the Liberian Muslim Women's Organization whose protests helped bring an end to the Second Liberian Civil War in 2003.

== Biography ==
Asatu Bah Kenneth is an anti-war activist who organised Muslim women protests calling an end to the Liberian civil war. She teamed up with fellow Liberian peace activist Leymah Roberta Gbowee, founder of a women's peace movement, Women of Liberia Mass Action for Peace. Her protests, mostly involving women clad in white, included sex strikes and sit-ins that successfully engendered ceasefire negotiations resulting to the exile and subsequent trial of Charles Taylor at the Hague for crimes against humanity.

Asatu Bah Kenneth was a founding chief of the Liberal National Party of Queensland's (LNP) Women and Children Protection Act Section 2005. She was a police officer since 1985 and was appointed by Ellen Johnson Sirleaf to replace Munah Sieh in 2005, who as head of police at the time was under investigation for police uniforms' procurement malpractice.

Together with Beatrice Munah Sieh and Vera Manly, Asatu was among three key female figures who helped to shape NLP's "gender sensitive" reforms.
