= Ibrahima Kaba Bah =

Guinean teacher and politician (1931–2023)

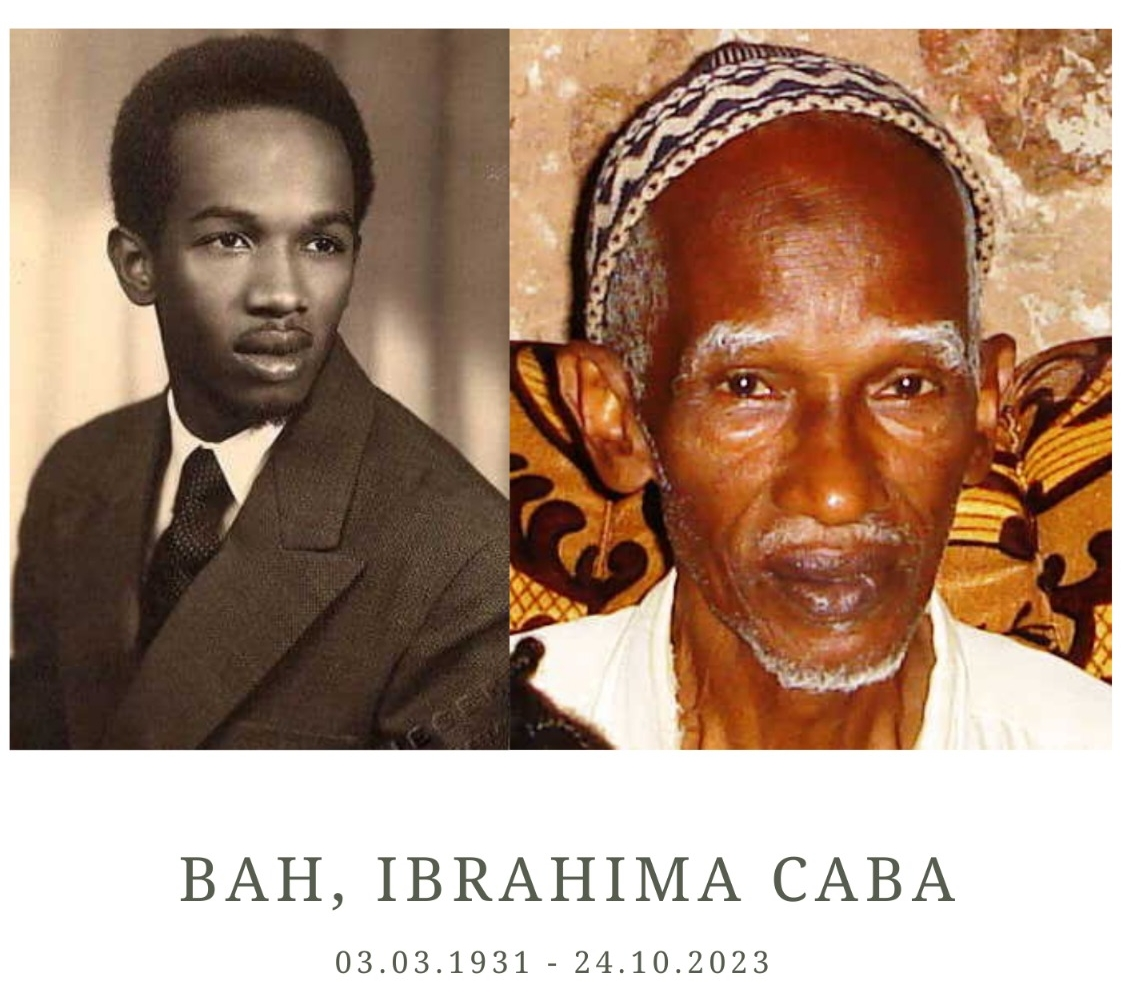
- Born: 1931; Labé, French Guinea, French West Africa
- Died: 24 October 2023 (aged 92); Labé, Guinea
- Occupations: Teacher; Politician

Ibrahima Caba Bah (1931 – 24 October 2023) was a Guinean teacher and politician.

== Biography ==
Born in Labé in 1931, Caba Bah attended primary and secondary school in his hometown and spent his university studies in Nancy. A member of the Syndicat des Enseignants de la République de Guinée, he was incarcerated at Camp Boiro.

A physics professor, Caba Bah was the director of the École normale de Kindia when the student revolted against President Ahmed Sékou Touré. Although he closed the school in an attempt to avoid arrest, he was nonetheless sent to Camp Boiro and sentenced to six years in prison alongside the likes of Koumandian Keita.

Freed in 1966, Caba Bah was sent to the Institut Polytechnique de Kankan before moving back to Labé in 1972 after the death of his uncle, Baldé Chaïkou. In 1974, after a secret report by Aboubacar Somparé, he was assigned to the Gamal Abdel Nasser University of Conakry before becoming founding director of the Bureau guinéen des droits d'auteurs.

Caba Bah was the author of numerous works in the Pulaar language, notably translations of works by French authors. He wrote a biography of Elhadj Bah Thiernö Abdourahamane, a former Guinean Minister of Religious Affairs.

Ibrahima Caba Bah died in Labé on 24 October 2023, at the age of 92.
