= Bubacarr Bah =

Gambian mathematician

- Born: The Gambia
- Education: University of the Gambia (BSc); University of Oxford (MSc); University of Edinburgh (PhD)
- Scientific career
- Fields: Applied mathematics; Computational mathematics; Data science
- Workplaces: École Polytechnique Fédérale de Lausanne; University of Texas at Austin; Stellenbosch University; African Institute for Mathematical Sciences
- Theses: Diffusion Maps: Analysis and Applications (2008); Restricted isometry constants in compressed sensing (2012)
- Doctoral advisor: Jared Tanner
- Website: sites.google.com/aims.ac.za/bubacarr

Bubacarr Bah is a Gambian mathematician. He is (as at July 2024) Associate Professor and Head of Data Science at the MRC Unit based at Banjul, The Gambia. (Note that the unit is run by the London School of Hygiene & Tropical Medicine - but was previously managed by the Medical Research Council (United Kingdom). See COVID-19 pandemic in the Gambia). He was previously (2016 - 2022) the chair of Data Science at the African Institute for Mathematical Sciences (AIMS). He has recently been assistant professor at Stellenbosch University.

== Early life and education ==
Bah was born in The Gambia. He studied mathematics at the University of the Gambia and graduated summa cum laude in 2004. He was awarded a Master of Science (MSc) degree from the University of Oxford, where he studied mathematical modelling as a postgraduate student of Wolfson College, Oxford. He joined the University of Edinburgh, where his PhD investigated compressed sensing and was supervised by Jared Tanner. He was a member of the Society for Industrial and Applied Mathematics (SIAM) student chapter. His work on Gaussian matrices was awarded the SIAM best student paper.

== Research and career ==
Between 2012 and 2014 Bah was a postdoctoral researcher at the École Polytechnique Fédérale de Lausanne, where he continued his investigations into compressed sensing. He was a member of the Laboratory for Information and Inference Systems.

In 2014 Bah joined the University of Texas at Austin, where he worked on signal processing, machine learning and sampling strategies in high-dimensional data. He developed a matrix for dimensionality reduction that uses bi-Lipschitz embeddings, which can exploit data redundancy.

In 2016 Bah was appointed the German Chair in Mathematics at the African Institute for Mathematical Sciences (AIMS), which is supported by the Humboldt Foundation. The position was welcomed by the AIMS community, who believe Africa needs better data science infrastructure. Bah organised the software engineering for Applied Mathematical Sciences workshop, which teaches basic programming and research programming. He is responsible for connecting the AIMS in South Africa with central Africa and German universities. As of 2019, the Alexander von Humboldt Foundation supports five chairs at AIMS centres. He holds a joint position at Stellenbosch University, where he works on information theory and deep learning.

In March 2019 Bah was appointed to the Google advanced technology external advisory council, a collection of experts who will consider the artificial intelligence (AI) principles of Google. Google disbanded ATEAC on April 4, 2019 following criticism by Google employees about another member, Kay Coles James.
