= Yunusa N. Bah =

Gambian politician

Member of the National Assembly of the Gambia for Kiang Central
- Incumbent
- Assumed office 17 April 2022
- Preceded by: Bakary Camara

Personal details
- Political party: Independent

Yunusa N. Bah is a Gambian politician who has served in the National Assembly representing Kiang Central since 2022 as an Independent politician. Bah is supportive of a transition away from fossil fuels.

== Sexual assault allegation ==
In 2023, Bah was accused by a 23-year-old woman, Jagana Sumareh, of sexually assaulting her in Brikama Gidda. Bah denied the allegations in a WhatsApp audio.

== Electoral history ==
Bah was elected in the 2022 Gambian parliamentary election to the Kiang Central constituency as an Independent with 1976 votes to NPP Fafa Sanyang's 1184 votes and UDP Bakary Camara's 1533 votes.
