= Ba Denian =

Chinese immunologist, physician and educator

- Born: 27 October 1938 (age 87); Siping, Jilin Province
- Education: Harbin Medical University; Beijing Medical University; Hokkaido University
- Occupations: immunologist physician educator

Ba Denian (Chinese: 巴德年; pinyin: Bā Dénián; born 27 October 1938) is a Chinese immunologist, physician and educator. He retired from his last position as Dean of Zhejiang University School of Medicine and accepted the position as Honorary Director of Zhejiang University Health Science Center.

== Biography ==
Ba, of Manchu descent, was born in Siping, Jilin Province on 27 October 1938. In 1962, Ba graduated from the Harbin Medical University. In 1967, Bahereceived his master's degree from the Beijing Medical University (later merged into Peking University and became its medical school). In 1982, he obtained PhD from Hokkaido University in Japan.

Ba is a specialist in tumor immunology. He discovered the natural thymocytotoxic autoantibody. Ba also proposed a theory to illustrate the relationship between some abnormal immune functions and hypertension.

Ba was elected to Chinese Academy of Engineering in 1994, and is a foreign member of the National Academy of Medicine since 1999.

== Academic appointments ==
- Former President, Chinese Academy of Medicine
- Former President, Peking Union Medical College
- Vice-president, Chinese Medical Association
- Honorary President, Chinese Immunological Society
- Honorary Director-general, Chinese Society for Biomedical Engineering
- Dean of Zhejiang University School of Medicine
- Honorary Director, Zhejiang University Health Science Center
