= Fonio husking machine =

Machine for husking fonio seeds

The fonio husking machine was invented by Sanoussi Diakité, a Senegalese mechanical engineer. Diakité was awarded the Rolex Award in 1996 for the invention.

Fonio is a staple crop in western Africa. Because the fonio grains are so small, their brittle outer shell is difficult to remove. "For hundreds of years, African women have carried out the painstaking task of preparing fonio by pounding and threshing a grain and sand mixture with a pestle and mortar. After one hour of this tedious work, only two kilograms of fonio are available for consumption and fifteen liters of water are needed to remove the sand." The whole process has been reduced from a 1-hour job to a 6-minute job.

Diakité's solution was a 50-kilogram (110 lb) device that gently abrades the surface of the seed before passing through a rotating mechanism, which removes the husks. The machine can husk 5 kilograms (11 lb) of fonio in 8 minutes.

== Awards ==
Diakité's device is an example of appropriate technology, because of its ability to solve a significant problem in developing countries and the ease with which it can be manufactured. In 2008, Diakité's work was one of the laureates of The Tech Awards in the Health Award category.

Diakité received the Innovation Prize for Africa in 2013.

== See also ==
- Malian peanut sheller
- Digitaria exilis
