= Christine Oppong =

British academic

- Occupation: Academic

Academic background
- Education: University of Cambridge; University of Ghanaa

Christine Oppong is a British academic. She is a retired professor of Applied Anthropology at University of Ghana, and a senior member at Wolfson College, Cambridge.

== Education ==
Oppong obtained her bachelor's, Master's, and doctorate degrees in Anthropology from the University of Cambridge. She also holds a Master of Arts degree in African Studies from the Institute of African Studies, University of Ghana.

== Career ==
Oppong has taught at the Institute of African Studies for over twenty five (25) years. She also once served as a research anthropologist, and technical and policy adviser in Gender, Population, and Development in the International Labour Organization's Employment and Development Department at Geneva.

Oppong has been a fellow of the Ghana Academy of Arts and Sciences since 1998, the Royal Anthropological Institute from 1979 to 1996, and the Netherlands Institute for Advanced Study from 2000 to 2001, and 2003.

== Research work ==
Oppong's research work have been in the fields of Gender, Development, Population, and Family. Her works have included a series of volumes of publications centred on fifty years of family change, the research work was concentrated on Ghana and the United Kingdom. Some of her works include;

- A Synopsis of Seven Roles and Status of Women: An Outline of a Conceptual and Methodological Approach, (1980);
- Middle Class African Marriage: A Family Study of Ghanaian Senior Civil Servants, (1981);
- The Seven Roles Framework: Focused Biographies and Family Size: a Ghanaian Study, (1984);
- Relationships Between Women's Work and Demographic Behaviour: Some Research Evidence in West Africa, (1991);
- Smiling Infants Or Crying Babies: Taking Reproduction Labour and Material Strain Into Acoount [sic] in Sustainable Development Frameworks, Policies, and Plans, (2000);
- Conjugal Resources, Power, Decision Making and Domestic Labour: Some Historical and Recent Evidence of Modernity from Ghanaian Families, (2005);
- Marriage Among a Matrilineal Elite: A Family Study of Ghanaian Senior Civil Servants, (2009);
- Growing Up in Dagbon, (2013).

== Awards and honours ==
Oppong was awarded a plaque by the University of Ghana for her over twenty five years services to the university's Institute of African Studies, and her contributions to the development of research and teaching at the Institute.
