= Alioune Bâ =

Malian photographer

- Born: January 1, 1959; Bamako
- Died: July 1, 2018 (aged 59); Bamako
- Occupation: Photographer

Alioune Bâ (January 1, 1959 - July 1, 2018) was a Malian photographer.

== Life and Career ==
Bâ was born in Bamako. He started working for the Musée National du Mali (National Museum of Mali) in 1983. His art focuses on the body, in particular the hands and feet of his subjects.

== Publications ==
=== Publications by Bâ ===
- Alioune Ba Photographe. Les Carnets de la Création. Montreuil, France: De l Oeil, 1985. ISBN 978-2912415172. With an essay by Claudie Rieu, "Le bruissement du monde".

=== Publications with contributions by Bâ ===
- Photographes de Bamako: de 1935 à nos jours. Collection Soleil. Paris: Revue Noire, 1989. ISBN 978-2909571218. Photographs by Bâ, Mountaga Dembélé, Seydou Keïta, Félix Diallo, Sakaly, AMAP, Emmanuel Daou, Abdourahmane Sakaly, Malick Sidibé, and others. With a text by Érika Nimis. In French and English.
