= Mamadou Diakité (politician) =

Malian politician (born 1950)

Mamadou Diakité (born 1950, in Bamako) is the Minister of Youth, Work, Employment and Professional Development of Mali since 24 April 2012.
