= Mahmoud Bah =

Guinean political activist and writer

Mahmoud Bah (born 1940 in Labé) is a Guinean political activist and writer born to the Fulani tribe. He is best known as one of the figures Amnesty International were eager to release during his imprisonment in the Boiro Mamadou Concentration Camp between 1979 and 1984 after campaigning in France as part of the Rassemblement des Guinéens de l'Extérieur (Rally of Guineans Abroad).

== Biography ==
Bah attended elementary school in Labé, secondary in Conakry and later in France, where he obtained a degree in chemistry and food engineering.

After the arrest of his brother, Ibrahima Kaba Bah, during a teachers' strike in Guinea, Bah sought exile, first in Dakar, then in France, where he campaigned for the Rassemblement des Guinéens de l'Extérieur (Rally of Guineans Abroad) political party of opposition to the regime of Ahmed Sékou Touré. During a short stay in Guinea in 1979, Bah was arrested for treason and transferred to the Mamadou Concentration Camp. Following Amnesty International pressure on the regime of Touré and the death of Guinean dictator following the coup organized by a military junta led by Lansana Conté, Bah was released on 3 April 1984. He returned to France and taught in High School until his retirement in 2005.

== Selected works ==
Bah is the author of several books and manuscripts on Guinea. He has been cited as the "first author to openly tie himself to any form of anti-PDG organization".

- Construire la Guinée après Sékou Touré, Éditions L'Harmattan, 1990
- Guinée 1958-2008 : Sortir du Ghetto, Éditions Menaibuc, 2008
