= God of Waters (Sre folktale) =

Folktale from Vietnam sourced to the Koho people

THẦN NƯỚC (English: "God of Waters") is a folktale from Vietnam sourced to the Sre (Koho people), wherein a girl marries a deity in snake form, and, in the second part of the story, her sister or another girl tries to have the same fortune as her by finding another snake and is accidentally devoured. In the Vietnamese tale, the heroine's sister also tries to get rid of her by drowning her in the sea, but she survives.

The tale is related to the international cycle of the Animal as Bridegroom, wherein a heroine marries a husband in animal form who reveals he is a man underneath. In this case, the heroine marries a husband in animal shape that becomes human, while another girl marries a real animal and dies. Variants of the narrative are located in India, Southeast Asia, and in Vietnam.

== Sources ==
The tale "God of the Waters" was published in the compilation "Сказки Тэй-нгуена" ("Tales of Tay Nguyen"), and translated to Russian as "Властитель вод" ("The Lord of Waters").

== Summary ==
In this tale, a man has two daughters, Nga and Nzi. One day, the man finds a snake in the forest, which demands one of the man's daughters in marriage. The man offers Nga, but the snake rejects the offer. The man then offers Nzi, and the animal accepts it. The man returns home and tells Nzi of the incident, and the girl decides to offer herself to the snake to protect the village. Nzi goes to the shore to wait for the snake, secretly followed by her sister Nga. Nga sees the snake and runs back home. The snake turns into a young man, Trachanlan, the lord of the waters, and spends the night with his bride. The next day, Nzi wakes up first, sees her husband's snakeskin, and buries it in the sand. Trachanlan wakes up next and ask Nzi about the snakeskin, but the girl feigns ignorance. Later, he asks the animals about it, and discovers Nzi hid out of fear he may devour her. He promises he will not do such a thing.

One day, Nzi and Trachanlan visit her father, Zobuo; Nga notices her brother-in-law's beauty, and intends to get rid of her sister. Trachanlan asks his father-in-law to not allow Nzi out of the house, for he is going on a journey to the country of the Tyams. While he is away. Nga convinces her sister to go for a walk on the beach, despite Zobuo's orders against it. Nzi takes an orange and an egg with her, and is murdered by Nga, who goes home to pass herself off as Trachanlan's wife. The Sun, a relative of Trachanlan, witnesses the murders and orders two fishes to come fetch Nzi's body. Nzi revives and, after four days, goes back to the shore with a son in tow (since she was pregnant), and plants the orange in the ground. A large orange tree sprouts. The egg she carried with her hatched and produced a rooster. Later, Trachanlan oars around and comes to buy some oranges from a boy (not knowing the boy is his son). They recognize each other and sail together back home - after Trachanlan, in serpent form, fought a sea deity - and rejoin with their family. The boy hits Nga on the head with a plate, but Trachanlan asks his son to forgive her, and goes to the orange tree to call out for Nzi to come down the tree.

The tale continues as Trachanlan goes away on another journey, and Nga tries to kill Nzi in two other occasions. After two more foiled attempts, she decides to find a snake for her to marry, hoping to repeat her sister's success. However, Nga finds a snake that devours her. Trachanlan learns of this and rescues his sister-in-law, despite her previous behaviour. Nga comes out of the snake's stomach alive, but scarred all over her body. Trachanlan warns her not to go out in the midday sun, but Nga does and turns into a lizard.

== Analysis ==
=== Tale type ===
In their analysis of Vietnamese "Snake Groom" stories, researcher Thi Tuyet Nhung Nguyen recognizes a narrative pattern termed "蛇との交換の約束" ("Exchanging a Promise with a Snake"): an old man or woman finds a snake that threatens them in exchange for marrying one of their daughters, or the snake helps the old person in return for a favour, like returning their axe. This is considered to the commonest starting sequence in Vietnamese stories. The old parent summons their daughters to see who will agree to marry the snake: all refuse, save the youngest. The heroine marries the snake man, who gets rid of the snake disguise either by the heroine burning it or by the hero washing his body in a river. The story may then continue as one of two sequences:

1. The snake husband, in human form, departs, and the heroine's elder sisters try to get rid of her by killing her or drowning her in the river; the heroine goes through a cycle of incarnations, or washes ashore on an island where she reunites with her husband.
2. After learning of the heroine's fortunate marriage with the snake, her elder sister or a neighbour girl wants to have a snake husband for herself, and goes in search of one in the forest; she brings home a real animal which devours her; the "typical ending" of the Vietnamese tales is that the second girl is rescued.

The second continuation of the narrative is classified in the international Aarne-Thompson-Uther Index as AaTh 433C, "The Serpent Husband and The Jealous Girl", a subtype of type AaTh 433, "The Prince as Serpent". In this tale type, a girl marries a snake who gives her jewels and ornaments and becomes human after the burning of his snakeskin; another girl tries to imitate with a real snake, with disastrous and fatal results.

However, in his own revision of the folk type index, published in 2004, German folklorist Hans-Jörg Uther subsumed types AaTh 433 ("The Prince as Serpent"), AaTh 433A ("A Serpent Carries a Princess to Its Castle") and AaTh 433C under a new type: ATU 433B, "King Lindworm".

=== Motifs ===
==== The snake husband ====
According to researcher Thi Tuyet Nhung Nguyen, the snake groom in Vietnamese tales is a snake god or the son of a water god, and connected to water. This is due to the belief and worship of snakes as water gods and river deities. After marriage to the snake, the human bride is said to become wealthier and her family to be living a more fulfilling life.

==== Other motifs ====
Type 433C also contains the motif J2415.7, "A snake for the real daughter. Stepdaughter, married to a snake, appears decorated with jewels. Stepmother desires a snake be procured for her daughter. She is swallowed instead".

== Variants ==
In his 1961 revision of the tale type index, American folklorist Stith Thompson indicated 5 variants of the type, found only in India. Hence, Thompson and Warren Roberts's work Types of Indic Oral Tales links this tale type "exclusively" to South Asia. In addition, according to professor Stuart Blackburn, this is the "Asian" version of the snake-husband story, and variants of the narrative (girl marries snake and is fortunate; jealous girl marries another snake and dies) are reported in India (in Nagaland and Assam), Southeast Asia, China, and among Tibeto-Burman speakers in central Arunachal Pradesh and the extended eastern Himalayas (e.g., the Apatani, Nyishi people, Tagin people, Garo people and Lisu people). Taiwanese scholarship also locates variants of subtype 433C in Cambodia and Indonesia.

=== Tale of Trah Trang Lan (Sre) ===
French linguist Jacques Dournes collected a tale in the Sre language with the title jaljaw trah traŋ lan (French: Conte de Trah Trang Lan, English: "Tale of Trah Trang Lan"). In this tale, a human hunter is preparing snares for prey, when a large snake named Trah Trang Lan blocks his away and demands one of his daughters in marriage. The hunter, however, offers one of his three sisters: Ngi, Nga, and Nai Töluiˀ, the latter already married to a Cham man. The snake asks for Nai Töluiˀ, lest he devours the hunter's entire village. The hunter goes home and relates the situation to his sisters. Nai Töluiˀ offers to go with the snake to protect the village, and marries him. To her relief, the snake becomes a human man. After some time, Nai Töluiˀ invites her husband, Trah Trang Lan, to visit her family. Later, Trah Trang Lan says he will journey to the Cham country, and asks his brother-in-law, the hunter, to not let Nai Töluiˀ out of the house on any reason. After he departs, Nga, the middle sister, envying her cadette's good fortune, invites her for a walk near the beach and cuts her throat. A crocodile appears and swallows Nai Töluiˀ whole. Inside the crocodile, Nai Töluiˀ gives birth to a son, who takes a knife his mother had with her and cuts open the reptile, then makes landfall with his mother to a beach. Once there, he plants an orange his mother had with her on the ground and a large tree sprouts, carrying his mother up to the heavens, and an egg Nai Töluiˀ also had with her hatches, releasing a rooster. On the road back from Cham country, Trah Trang Lan meets his son en route and recognizes him with the help of the Sun, a relative of his. After fighting a serpent lord of waters, Trah Trang Lan returns home with his son, but his sister-in-law Nga tries to pass herself off as Nai Töluiˀ, who finally descends from the heavens back to her husband. Defeated, Nga leaves them be and procures a serpent spouse for herself. She finds a baby snake in the forest and brings it with her. The snake grows large in time and eventually swallows Nga whole, then slithers off. Trah Trang Lan is asked by his wife to rescue Nga, and searches for the serpent in the bottom of a river. Trah Trang Lan dons the snakeskin once again to meet the animal underwater and tricks him with a large bridle, which is pulled by heavy elephants. The second snake is dragged back to land and Trah Trang Lan cuts open its belly to release Nga. Despite saving her, he still warns her not to stay in the sun. Nga disobeys his orders and stays under the sun rays, becoming a termite mound.

=== Ködu language ===
French linguist Jacques Dournes collected a similar tale in the "Ködu language" (which Dournes indicated is an Austroasiatic language). In this tale, a man is shooting birds atop a banyan tree, when a large python appears and demands the man surrenders it one of his daughters. The man returns home and explains the situations to his daughters: the eldest, Nga, refuses, while the youngest, Ngi, agrees to go with the python. Ngi is taken to meet her fiancée by the banyan tree, and the python is now a half-human, half-snake being. After her father leaves, the python metamorphoses into a whole human being, and the tree becomes a palace. Later, Ngi wants to visit her family, and her husband accompanies her in his serpent disguise. In his father-in-law's house, he takes off his snakeskin to sleep by Ngi's bedside as a human being, and a shining light irradiates from the couple's room. The elder sister, Nga, wants to experience the same fortune, so she finds a snake in the forest and brings it home in a calabash to rear it until it grows large enough. It happens thus, and the snake actually devours Nga whole, for it was a real animal, and slithers off. Ngi's husband goes after the snake to rescue his sister-in-law, and finds the animal in the bottom of a river. He drags the serpent to the shore and cuts open its belly to release Nga. After the rescue, the human python advises Nga not to leave the house. Despite the warning, Nga leaves to watch some cock fighting and, just as she is walking through the fields, she becomes a termite mound. As for her sister Ngi, she becomes the ancestress of the Kon Tac clan, whose members are forbidden to eat fruits from the banyan tree.

Jacques Dournes collected another tale from the "Ködu language": a couple has two daughters, the youngest named Pôt and the most beautiful. A human suitor, Bông, wants to marry her and wears an animal disguise to court her: he appears to her as a "serpent-dragon". Pôt agrees to a marriage between them and her parents move them out to a separate house. Alone in their new home, Bông takes off the snake disguise and reveals himself as a human being to Pôt. Her parents are content with this development and prepares a marriage party for them; their rice fields also grow. Pôt's elder sister, seeing her cadette's good fortune, decides to find herself a snake husband and brings home a small python in a calabash. She feeds the little animal until it grows large enough. Being a real animal, the python devours the elder sister and slithers off to the bottom of a river. Bông divines his sister-in-law's location and goes to rescue her. Down in the water, Bông tricks the python and places a "wedding necklace" on it, strangling the animal with it, then drags the python to land and cuts off its belly to release his sister-in-law, still alive. After saving her, Bông warns her not to approach the python's bones. Seven days later, the woman visits the resting place of the python, now a skeleton, and steps on a bone. She dies at once.

=== Tale of a Python that marries Miss Lui (Bahnar) ===
Dournes published a tale from the Bahnar language, first collected by Paul Guilleminet. In this tale, titled hamɔ :n bih klan ɔɛi kə bia luiˀ (French: Conte d’un serpent python qui épousa damoiselle Luiˀ; English: "Tale of a Python that marries Miss Lui"), a lord goes to carve a crossbow in a mountainous forest, but loses the head of his axe. He hears a snake hissing and announces he will be its brother-in-law, then its uncle, and lastly he will marry one of his daughters to person hissing. The snake appears to him with the axe part and asks for Luiˀ, the youngest daughter, as its bride. The lord returns home and asks his three daughters which will accept the snake's proposal: the elder two, K'Kruah and Püon, refuse, save for Luiˀ, if only to please her father. The snake is invited to the lord's home and is put to a test to see if he can act in a human manner before them: a dish of cooked eggs and another with raw eggs, and rice beer. The snake acts "like a Bahnar" (in the original text); his behaviour pleases the lord and it marries Luiˀ. Later, Luiˀ and the snake bridegroom go for a bath in a river, Luiˀ going downstream while the snake takes off his snakeskin to become a human man and throws it in the stream. Luiˀ finds the discarded snakeskin and brings it upstream, where she meets her bridegroom in human form, whom she does not recognize. The snake, in human form, clarifies the situation, and they live happily. Meanwhile, another lord in the same village wants his daughter to experience the same fortune, and procures a snake in the forest as a potential son-in-law. The second lord meets a snake who explains it can never be human, because he is an animal, but it is brought to the lord's house despite its warning. The snake is put to the same test of raw eggs and rice beer and acts on instinct, like the animal it is, then is moved out to the lord's daughter's room. In the same night, it begins to devour the girl little by little; the girl tries to call her father for help, but the man dismisses her concerns as simply her husband playing with her. The snake devours the girl entirely, then slithers to the ocean. The second lord enters his daughter's room and, seeing she has vanished with the snake, mourns for her with funeral rites.

=== How a girl married a python (Xe Dang) ===
In a tale from the Xe Dang people with the Vietnamese title CÔ GÁI LẤY CHỒNG TRĂN ("Girl Marrying a Python"), translated to Russian as "Как девица питона в мужья взяла" ("How a girl married a python"), an old widow lives in a poor hut with two beautiful daughters. One day, she takes a bamboo basket with her to get fishes in the river. She takes a path to return home when a menacing python blocks the way. The old woman begs for her life, since she has two young daughters to care for. The python's curiosity is piqued and it makes a deal with the old woman: one of her daughters as the python's bride in exchange for her life. The old woman goes home and asks which of her daughters will take a python for a husband; the elder sister declines, but the youngest accepts. The elder sister takes their mother home while the younger leaves with the snake to its lair. She spends the night in the cave, but in the morning a handsome youth wakes her up. The girl is surprised to see such a handsome person, and the youth says he is the snake. They cut up some bamboos to make a house for them near the river and live happily, with the python donning his snakeskin to fish in the river. One day, the elder sister goes looking for the younger one and sees the house by the river, the girl cooking by the fire and a handsome youth beside her. She realizes the youth is the snake and fumes silently. Seeing her sister's good luck, an idea brews in her mind: she goes to the woods to look for a python husband. She finds one that agrees to marry her and takes the girl to its lair. Unfortunately for the girl, this python devours her. Back to the old widow, she senses something wrong with her daughter and asks her son-in-law for help. The youth searches the woods for the girl and finds the python; he kills the python and revives his wife's elder sister. The tale was also reprinted as Trăn thần ("Snake Deity").

=== Python Son-in-Law (Cham) ===
In a Vietnamese tale from the Cham people titled Rể trăn or Rê trăn ("Python Son-In-Law"), an old woman has three daughters. One day, she goes to the river to catch some fishes, when a python appears and coils around her legs. The woman screams, and the python begins to talk, demanding that the woman surrenders one of her daughters in marriage to it, lest it bites her to death. A passerby sees the situation and goes to warn the three daughters. The girls come to their mother's aid, and she asks the elder first if she wants to marry the python. The elder refuses. The woman sends for the middle daughter and asks her if she wants to marry the snake to save her mother. She also refuses. The cadette goes to talk to the python and agrees to marry the animal to save her mother. The python agrees and releases the old woman. At night, the elder sister spies on her cadette's bedroom to see what will happen to the python. However, she finds a handsome youth talking to her, instead of any animal. The following morning, the elder sister reports the incident to her mother and asks her to find her a python. Days later, a large python enters the elder daughter's room and begins to devour her. She screams for help, but her mother dismisses her pleas as simply her future husband. The following morning, the woman cannot find her elder daughter, goes to her room and finds only the python with a swollen belly. She screams for help. Her son-in-law hears the screams, takes a knife and goes to help his mother-in-law by cutting the python's belly to rescue his sister-in-law.

=== Python God (Cham) ===
In a Vietnamese tale titled Trăn thần ("Python God"), collected from a Cham source, an old widow lives with her only daughter in a ranshacked hut on the edge of their village. Both are hardworking women who toil hard all day under the hot sun in the fields planting rice and potatoes and sharing the crops with the village leader, who keeps to himself the best part. The girl and the old woman keep less of their crops, and the girl shares her meal with her mother. During the harvest festivals, the villagers put on nice clothes to dance, save for the girl, who has to work hard from sunrise to sundown. One day, they go to the fields before sunrise with a hoe and a shovel, then begin plowing the fields and removing the burnt stumps. At noon, they decide to stop to rest, with the old woman resting under a tree. Suddenly, her daughter screams that a large python appeared in front of her, waking the old woman with a startle. The woman goes to help her daughter and advises her to take a branch and shoo it away. They notice the python's eyes do not seem menacing, but the girl takes a bamboo stick to shoo the reptile away, and it slithers to the bushes. Mother and daughter finish their daily chores by sunset and put away their tools, when the python appears and coils around the hoe. The woman says they cannot work without their hoe, and tells her daughter to bring the serpent home. The girl places the snake upon a cloth and takes it home, then shares their rice with the snake. The family goes to sleep, with the python in the girl's room. In the middle of the night, the girl sees a flash inside her room and feels frightened, but a handsome youth appears before her, thanking her for bringing him home and feeding him, and promises to be her husband. He introduces himself as the son of the mountain god who appreciated her kindness, and the girl shows him to her mother, who agrees to their marriage. The youth tells them to burn the snakeskin, which is done so. The family work in the fields, and the son of the mountain god visits his father to bring his wife and mother-in-law nice gifts which they use in the village festival. In the same village, lives another woman with her daughter, also a widow, but of a rich Cham governor with wealth, rich clothes, and servants. During a festival in the village, the second woman learns of the story of the marriage between the poor girl and the python, and devises a plan: she sends her servants with shovels and hoes to the fields, goes with her daughter and tries to replicate the other girl's actions. However, since no python coils around the hoe, the rich woman orders her servants to find a python, and they search for a snake nearby, finding a large black snake which they bring home. They treat the snake as a guest and arrange good accommodations for it, placing the animal inside her daughter's room. The woman tells the girl she should sleep in the same room as the snake, to her horror. The girl spends the night with the snake, while her mother waits outside for the python son-in-law to become a rich youth. However, the snake begins to swallow the girl little by little (first her feet, then her knees, and her chest), and she cries for help, but her mother dismisses her pleas, until there is only silence. The following morning, the rich woman goes to see her daughter, but finds only the snake and a lock of her daughter's hair outside the python's mouth. She lets out a cry, and dies of shock.

=== The Serpent-Husband ===
In a Vietnamese tale translated to French with the title L'époux-serpent ("The Serpent-Husband"), an old father lives with his two beautiful daughters of marriageable age. The girls work in the cotton fields, picking it and carding it. One day, the girls ask their father to build a new spinning wheel, and the man goes to the forest to fetch some bamboo to build one. However, a downpour suddenly falls on the forest and the river floods, washing away a bridge. The downpour continues until evening, when the man utters aloud that if anyone could help him, he would give one of his daughters in marriage to them. A large serpent snakes from the water and asks the man about his promise. Afraid the snake, the man feigns ignorance and says that he was only complaining about hunger and the cold. The serpent accuses the man of lying, and reiterates that the man promised a daughter in marriage, so the serpent extends itself across the river for the man to cross it as a makeshift bridge. The man returns home in a worried state and his elder daughter questions him about it. He explains about the situation and asks if she will marry the serpent. The elder vehemently refuses, while the youngest offers to marry the animal. The man thanks the cadette, but believes that the serpent will not appear.

The following morning, the large serpent slithers through the main road of the village, and the man announces that it is his daughter's fiancé, so they have to ring the gong and organize a wedding, in a sad state. The girl accompanies her serpent husband by a river, and the serpent asks her if she wants to bathe herself. The girl says that wives should obey their husband, and lets him bathe himself first. The serpent then dives into the water, and out comes a handsome youth, who tells the girl he is her husband. The girl is happy for this outcome, and both return home. The elder sister learns of this, and begins to nurture jealousy towards her cadette, planning to get rid of her. One day, the serpent husband has to go on a journey, and departs, leaving his wife unprotected. The elder sister invites her cadette for a picnic near the river, with a lemon, salt, some paprika, and a knife. As soon as the girl cuts the lemon, the elder sister shoves her in the river, and she is devoured by a giant fish. Inside the fish, the girl gives birth to a baby boy who grows up to a certain age and begins to talk, asking his mother why they are inside a fish. The boy then asks his mother for the knife, the salt, and the paprika which the girl still has with her, cuts up teh fish from the inside out and tosses the salt and paprika on the wounds. A bird flies in and captures the bird to take to its nest atop a tree. The girl and baby come out of the fish, leave the nest and traverse the jungle, until they come across the serpent husband and his retinue.

The family reunites, and the girl reveals her sister's attempt against her. The serpent husband promises to build a hut for his wife, while he returns home alone. He returns home and is welcomed by his sister-in-law, who feigns being in mourning and offers to marry the serpent husband to allay his suffering. The serpent husband makes a vow never to remarry and to stay a widower. The elder sister insists on the offering, until she gives up and asks her brother-in-law to find her her own serpent husband. He goes to the river to procure a serpent, but the serpent that lives in the river wants nothing to do with marriage - an information that he relays to his sister-in-law. Not believing in the serpent husband, the elder sister orders ten men to capture the serpent and bring it home for her to marry. The elder sister celebrates a grand wedding, the serpent eats a whole meal and goes to sleep, and is carried to her room. In the middle of the night, the serpent wakes up, swallows the elder sister whole and raw, and slithers back to the river. The girls' father goes to check on his elder daughter the following morning, but cannot find her. He realizes what happened and seeks his serpent son-in-law's help. The serpent son-in-law agrees to answer his plight, takes a dagger and dives into the river to kill the snake. He then comes out of the water carrying the barely alive body of his sister-in-law, which he places at the feet of her father. The serpent son-in-law admits that he killed the snake, and so did the elder to her younger sister, almost. The girls' father learns of his elder daughter's doing, and she feels so ashamed by the ordeal, she mellows out in time. The serpent husband brings back his wife and son and they live together with her father in peace.

== See also ==
- Champavati
- The Story of the Hamadryad
- The Origin of the Sirenia
- King Iguana
- Sọ Dừa (Vietnamese folktale)
