= Trương Ba's Soul in the Butcher's Body =

Trương Ba's Soul, Butcher's Body (Hồn Trương Ba, da hàng thịt) is a Vietnamese folk tale about a gentle gardener who dies, but because of the carelessness of the gods he is reborn in the body of an oafish butcher.

The most famous theatrical setting of the story is the 1985 play by Lưu Quang Vũ, translated by Lorelle Lee Browning Truong as Ba's Soul [in] the Butcher's Skin: A Play 1998.

== Plot ==
Trương Ba is famous for not only being a very good chess player but also a good husband. He lives happily with his wife even though the couple does not have a single child. Unlike Trương Ba's family, the butcher's family is an unhappy family.

One day, Đế Thích saw that Trương Ba was playing chess so well, so he went down to the earth to play with Trương Ba. He gave him some magical incense sticks, so that when Trương Ba wanted to play chess with him, he could burn one of those sticks to invite Đế Thích. But not long after that, Trương Ba died. On the anniversary of his death, Trương Ba's wife was very sad and lit incense for him. Unknowingly she lit a magical incense stick and Đế Thích appeared before her.

Đế Thích learned that Trương Ba had died. He felt sorry for his friend who died early and wanted Mrs. Trương Ba to be happy, he promised to bring Trương Ba back to life. However, Trương Ba died a long time ago and his body had already rotten so it was unable for his soul to return.

At that time, the butcher has recently died because of his carelessness. So Đế Thích took the butcher's body so that Trương Ba's soul could enter it. Trương Ba now happily returned to his wife. His wife, instead of being happy, was surprised and scared because she did not think it was Trương Ba. After listening to Trương Ba's story, she believed his words and was very happy. As for the butcher's wife, she was angry, jealous, and insisted that Trương Ba (in the butcher's body) was her husband, and then both wives sued each other and asked the local official to judge for them.

The official asked the butcher who was his wife, he pointed to Trương Ba's wife and said that his "another-wife" is the wife of the butcher in the neighborhood. The official asked how to make pigs for meat, he said he knows nothing, but when asked about chess, he answered very competently. The official was frustrated because of the "one person's soul was in another's body" event. He privately questioned Trương Ba's wife if she had done anything special while her husband was still alive. Trương Ba's wife revealed the story: After Đế Thích went down to play chess with her husband, he was very fond of him and promised that when her husband dies, he would save his life. Unfortunately she forgot about that, not until her husband's death anniversary that she remembered Đế Thích's promise. At the same time, the butcher has just died, and Đế Thích brought Trương Ba's soul into the butcher's body. The official then asked the butcher privately, asked him about the story, he answered exactly like the wife's words. Finally, his judgement was: "By day you will become a butcher, by night you will become Trương Ba."

And from here, conflicts in life between the soul and the body begin to arise.

== See also ==
- Trương Ba's Soul, Butcher's Body (film) romantic comedy
