= So dua =

So dua or So Dua may refer to:

- Sesbania grandiflora, or so đũa in Vietnamese, a leguminous tree
- Sọ Dừa (Vietnamese folktale)
