= The Hundred-knot Bamboo Tree =

Vietnamese fable and parable

The Hundred-knot Bamboo Tree (also The Bamboo of 100 Joints) (Vietnamese: Cây tre trăm đốt) is a Vietnamese fable and parable, Vietnamese fairy tale and part of Vietnamese oral tradition. The story is included in anthologies of Vietnamese stories.

The story is about a laborer who is exploited by a wealthy landowner. In order to keep and motivate the laborer, the landowner promises to reward him with marriage to his daughter after three years of labor. When the time for marriage arrives, the landowner breaks his promise by offering his daughter to another man. When the laborer complains, the landowner tries to trick him again by sending him in search of a bamboo stalk with one hundred segments, again promising him his daughter if the laborer can find the bamboo stalk. After divine intervention granting him the secret of joining bamboo knots, the laborer returns and punishes the landowner and triumphs in the end.

== See also ==
- Myths and legends about bamboo
