= Vietnamese fairy tales =

Famous Vietnamese fairy tales include The Hundred-knot Bamboo Tree and The Story of Tấm and Cám. Various tales have been translated into English, as well as folk tales containing some elements of fairy tales.

== Well known tales ==
- "The Wishing Pearl" - a peasant befriends an animal and receives a magic gift
- "The Student and the Frog" - about a frog who becomes a beautiful woman
- Tấm Cám ("The Two Sisters") - a dark Cinderella story
- Từ Thức Gặp Tiên ("Từ Thức and the Goddess") - A mandarin meets a girl at a Buddhist temple who is really a goddess.
- "The Student and the Painting" - a girl in a painting
- Ba Giai and Tú Xuất are a comical duo in South folk tales
- Cây Tre Trăm Đốt ("The Hundred-Knot Bamboo Tree") - a laborer struggles to triumph above his exploitative employer
- Sọ Dừa (Coconut Skull)
- Ngưu Lang Chức Nữ or Ông Ngâu Bà Ngâu - Vietnamese version of The Cowherd and the Weaver Girl
- Thach Sanh
- The Golden Starfruit Tree
