= Trương Ba's Soul, Butcher's Body (film) =

2006 film

Hon Truong Ba da hang thit
- Theatrical release poster
- Directed by: Quang Dung Nguyen
- Written by: Quang Dung Nguyen
- Starring: Johnny Tri Nguyen; Phuoc Sang; Anh Thu; Minh Thuan; Phuong Thanh; Luong Manh Hai; Kim Thu
- Cinematography: Nguyen Tranh; K'Linh
- Edited by: Nguyen Manh Tin
- Music by: Quoc Bao
- Production company: Phuoc Sang Entertainment
- Distributed by: Phuoc Sang Entertainment; HK Film
- Release date: February 11, 2006
- Running time: 99 minutes
- Country: Vietnam
- Language: Vietnamese

Truong Ba's soul in butcher's body (Vietnemese original title: Hồn Trương Ba, da hàng thịt) is a 2006 romantic comedy film directed by Quang Dung Nguyen and starring Johnny Tri Nguyen and Phuoc Sang. It is based on a traditional Vietnamese tale Trương Ba's Soul in the Butcher's Body that has inspired many comedies, musicals and novels.

== Cast ==
- Johnny Tri Nguyen as Truong Ba
- Phuoc Sang as Sang
- Anh Thu as Thi
- Minh Thuan as De Thich
- Phuong Thanh as Doctor Ngoc Hoang
- Luong Manh Hai as Quang Vinh
- Kim Thu as Thanh Thanh
- Vu Ngoc Dang as Thanh Thanh's brother
- Hoang Map as Sang's student
- Hieu Hien as Sang's student
- Phuc Beo as Sang's student
- Hoang Lan as Mrs. Le
- Ngoc Huong as Mrs. Hang
- Hoang Nhan as Old man
- Phuong Dung as House owner
- Le Bao Trung as Doctor
- Quang Dung Nguyen as Psycho patient
- Do Trung Quan as Psycho patient
- Nguyen Quang Sang as Psycho patient
- Bao Phuc as Psycho patient
- Dương Thu as Psycho patient
- Bui Chi Vinh as Psycho patient
- Nguyen Tranh as Psycho patient
