= Sọ Dừa (Vietnamese folktale) =

Vietnamese folktale

Sọ Dừa (English: "Coconut Skull" or "Coconut Shell Boy") is a Vietnamese folktale attributed to the Kinh people, about the marriage between a princess and the titular Coconut Skull, whose lame disguise belies a handsome youth underneath it; later, her envious sisters try to murder her and replace her as the lame suitor's wife. It is a form of the international cycle of the Animal as Bridegroom that exists in Vietnam.

== Summary ==
A poor couple lives in a village and works for a local rich lord. On one hot day, the wife goes into the forest to gather firewood, she becomes thirsty. Unable to find any water source, she notices a human skull filled with water which she drinks from. In time, she becomes pregnant, despite her old age, and her husband dies. While pregnant, she does the heavy lifting in the lord's house, and nine months later gives birth to a round, bodiless creature with a face. She tries to destroy whatever she gave birth to, wraps it in a cloth and goes to a river to drown it, but the creature pleads to be spared, since he is her son. The old woman brings the round boy home and raises him. Still, her employer banishes her and her son to a hut in the forest, since he believes the boy's birth was the work of evil spirits.

Despite his strange appearance, the spherical, bodiless son, named Sho Zya (which means 'coconut'), is intelligent. One day, his mother asks him to stay home, while she brings them some food and rice to eat. After she leaves, So Dua changes his appearance from a round coconut to that of a normal human youth and does the chores at home, then returns to his coconut shape. His mother notices all chores are done by the time she comes back but does not suspect anything. Later, after hearing his mother sighing about the local children herding buffalo and goat cattle in the village and the local lord offering similar job opportunities, So Dua offers to be the lord's shepherd to bring food home. Despite some reservations, his mother talks to the local lord of her son's decision, and So Dua is soon hired to the position: he is to take the cattle to graze in the mountains and return at night.

So Dua herds the goat cattle, come rain, come sunshine. The tale then explains that the lord's three daughters are tasked with bringing food to their goatherd during harvest time, while the servants are busy elsewhere. One day, the youngest daughter, kind and beautiful, unlike her elder sisters, goes to bring food to So Dua, and hears a sweet melody played on a flute. She looks for its source, and finds a handsome youth lying on a hammock and playing the tune. The girl is struck by the melody and the youth's beauty, and accidentally snaps a twig. Suddenly, the stranger stops playing and turns back to the round, bodiless So Dua. The girl is glad to have discovered his secret, and looks forward to her turns to bring him food, falling even more in love with him as time goes by.

Some time later, So Dua asks his mother to propose on his behalf to one of the lord's daughters. The lord demands a hefty suitor's task first: to produce a bowl of pure gold, ten pieces of fine silk, woven with silver and pearls, ten jars of wine, a herd of ten fat pigs and ten goats, and a five-story house. The coconut skull's mother informs his son about it. The lord also asks his daughters which one chooses to marry So Dua: the elder two refuse, save for the youngest, who agrees to marry whomever her father chooses for her. As the wedding approaches, So Dua's mother worries about delivering the requested gifts, but So Dua allays her fears and, on the wedding day, he uses his powers to transform their humble hut into a palace, then summons a retinue of richly-dressed people to carry the gifts to the lord's daughter. The coconut skull then invites every villager to his wedding party and marries the lord's cadette. He retires from the party for a while, when a handsome youth appears and takes So Dua's bride's hand in his, announcing he is, in fact, So Dua's true form.

The former coconut skull studies hard and takes on royal examinations at the king's capital, becoming a "Chang-Ngyuen". He goes back home to mourn for his dead mother, and is summoned back to the king's court at the capital. Before he departs, he gives his wife a flint, a knife and two chicken eggs as a precaution, and leaves to the king's court. Stories of So Dua's handsome countenance reach the ears of his sisters-in-law, who begin to despise their cadette and trick her to get rid of their rival: they invite So Dua's wife for a boatride downstream. As the boat sways on the turbulent waters and a giant fish devours the boats, the girl's elder sisters toss the oars in the water, swim back to the shore and abandon their sister to die in the sea, while they feign grieving for her.

The girl is swallowed by a large fish, but she takes out the knife and cuts her way out of the fish, killing it. She reaches an island where she makes her temporary residence, forages for roots and fruits and cooks the fish's meat with her husband's flint. The eggs also hatch a rooster and a hen she treats as her companions. One day, as a large boat, her husband's, sails along the coast, the rooster crows that its master is coming to rescue his wife. The hen crows soon after. So Dua docks on the island and reunites with his wife, then takes her on the ship with him, as they make their way home and his wife tells So Dua of the sisters-in-law's wicked plan. Thus, So Dua invites the whole village for a feast in celebration of his return. His sisters-in-law, still pretending to grief over their lost sister, don fine garments and attend the event. At one point, So Dua announces he will bring a guest to greet his in-laws: it is his wife, still alive, to the sisters' horror. The duo leave the event and are never seen again.

== Translations ==
The tale was also translated to Russian as "Человек, круглый, как кокосовый орех" ("A man round as a coconut"), wherein the coconut husband's name is given as Sho Zua.

== Analysis ==
=== Tale type ===
The tale is part of the Animal as Bridegroom cycle: a human maiden marries a man in strange or animal form and disenchants him, or to the cycle of the "person in animal disguise" or "person in ugly disguise". In another line of scholarship, scholar Tran Quynh Ngoc Bui recognized the Kinh story of So Dua as part of a new tale type, which he calls "the metamorphosed character tale type" which he abstracted based on tales from Vietnam. In this narrative, the main character is born to human parents in "grotesque corporeality" (an animal or some abnormal shape), bringing them disappointment and shame; later, the abnormal son expresses his wish to marry a local maiden, daughter to a ruler or a rich man who orders the prospective bridegroom to provide extravagant wedding gifts; the maiden marries the abnormal bridegroom, who becomes a normal human. According to Bui, some stories can thematically end at the hero's transformation, but they can continue with another sequence: the heroine's elder sisters try to kill her, but she survives with the help of some objects her husband gave her.

=== Motifs ===
==== The coconut husband ====
According to Russian Vietnamologist Nikolay Nikulin, the folklore of Vietnam, namely, from the Viets, the Cham and the mountain people of South Vietnam, is separate, but interconnected, so that it is characterized by a commonality of narratives which are, however, interpreted differently by each people. One example is the one story about the "hopeless boy/youth" ("Не подающем надежд", in the original) or "unpromising youth": a boy is born with uncanny appearance or with a "defect" that makes him look like a pumpkin, but he is diligent and hardworking, and helps his parents in their chores. In this narrative, the strange husband appears in the form of a round, legless and armless creature, like a coconut, a stone, a skull born to a childless couple; despite being ostracized by his appearance at first, he turns into a handsome youth and marries a local ruler's daughter. He appears as a handsome youth before his wife, who destroys the covering, causing him to remain human or to disappear.

This tale is said to be "very popular" in Southeast Asia, and the form of the son can alternate with a type of animal, like a snake or a monitor lizard, or another "lesser species", like an aquatic reptile or amphibian. Scholar Tran Quynh Ngoc Bui adds that the deformed husband can assume "a gourd, a goat, a toad, or a turtle shape" in tales from peoples from Vietnam.

=== Parallels ===
Vietnamese scholars have called attention to the similarities between the Kinh tale So Dua and stories from the Cham and Raglai wherein the main character is a male son born as a round coconut, but transforms into a human youth and marries a human princess. In addition, according to Russian Orientalist B. B. Parnikel, stories of the round, bodiless, limbless son who becomes a handsome youth exist "in particular" among the Viet, Cham, Sedang and Thai people. Scholar Tran Quynh Ngoc Bui reports the same character (hero born in coconut husk shape) from Thailand and Myanmar.

=== Origins ===
Scholar Tran Quynh Ngoc Bui sources the story of So Dua to Central Vietnam, due to the presence of coconut trees, for instance, in Tam Quan and Binh Dinh. In a different position, Vietnamese folklorist Nguyễn Đổng Chi considered that stories of So đừa ("The Coconut Shell Man") "adapted to Kinh culture" and ended like the tale "Marrying a Goat".

=== Interpretation ===
The story has been interpreted to hark back to totemic stories about tribal origins. In both cycles (the husband narrative and tribal myths), the strange husband's form (theriomorphic or phytomorphic) is linked to water.

In the same vein, scholar Tran Quynh Ngoc Bui notes that the form of the hero varies according to the tale and the tale according to its ethnic source, which means that the story and the character are seen differently, depending on the culture.

== Variants ==
=== Marrying a Goat ===
In a Vietnamese tale titled Lấy chồng dê ("Marrying a Goat"), an old couple live in a coastal village and suffer for not having children. They pray and hope for a child to ease their loneliness, until the old wife becomes pregnant and gives birth to a goat. Her husband wants the kid destroyed by being tossed in water, but the woman decides to raise as their own. The husband dies, and the woman takes care of the goat child. The goat son helps the woman in the daily chores and herds their cattle. When he is older, he asks his mother to court one of the daughters of a rich lord from a neighbouring village on his behalf. His mother questions who would want to marry a goat, but, on her son's insistence, decides to talk to the rich lord. The woman hesitates at first, but explains the reason for her visit to the rich lord, who belittles her, but sends for his three daughters. The three girls come and are asked which agrees to marry a goat: the elder two refuse, save for the cadette, who is willing to marry whomever her parents wish. The rich lord is surprised by his cadette's decision, but orders the old woman to provide a large dowry: large herds of buffaloes, oxen and pigs, and trays of silver and gold. The old woman returns home and talks to her son about the lord's demands, expecting that her son will be dissuaded of his marriage idea. However, the goat tells her not to worry, then, after she is asleep, he goes to their yard, removes his goatskin and summons servants to provide the dowry. On the wedding day, the goat marries the lord's youngest daughter. On the wedding night, the goat bridegroom removes his caprine skin to become a handsome youth, and returns to his animal disguise in the morning. The girl is delighted at this situation, and is asked about it by her elder sisters. The elder sisters spy on their brother-in-law becoming a handsome human youth, and soon advise their cadette to destroy the caprine skin to keep him human forever. It happens thus, and the goat husband is human from then on, to the elder sisters' immense jealousy.

A year later, the now human goat husband gives his wife a knife and a flint, asking her to keep both with her at all times, and departs on a long journey. The girl spends her time helping her mother-in-law. One day, the elder sisters pay them a visit and invite her to a festival. After some initial refusal, the girl accepts their invitation and joins her sisters on a boat by the dock. They sail a bit into the sea, and the two sisters push their cadette into the water when she is asleep, then make their way back to the beach. The duo pretend to be distraught and retell the accident. As for the goat's wife, a whale swallows her, but she pierces its belly with a knife and kills it. The dead whale's carcass is washed ashore on an island. She cuts her way out of the carcass and establishes herself on a island, using the flint to cook the whale meat and foraging for fruits and roots. One day, she spots a white sail in the distance and waves a makeshift flag to signal her presence to them. The boat docks and out comes her husband. The couple reunite, and his wife reveals her sisters' betrayal. The human goat husband arrives home and arranges a grand feast for his return and in his wife's honour, inviting the village and his relatives. His sisters-in-law attend the gathering in feigned grief, but try to seduce him. The goat husband bids them eat and drink to their heart's content, and selects a person to serve them: he pulls a curtain and out comes his wife, safe and sound. The elder sisters see their cadette is alive and flee in terror, but lightning strikes them dead as soon as they leave the premises. The goat husband and his wife live in happiness.

=== The Turtle Man ===
Vietnamese folklorist Nguyễn Đổng Chi reported a tale from the Xo Dang people with the title Chùng rửa ("The Turtle Man"). In this tale, a widower has three daughters. One day, his stove breaks down and a turtle offers to repair it, in exchange for marrying one of the man's daughters. After doing the favour, the man sends for his daughters and explains them the situation: the elder ones refuse, save for the youngest. The cadette marries the turtle, who removes his chelonian skin to become a handsome youth in a dazzling flash of light that illuminates the whole room like a fire. Eventually, the elder sisters find human husbands. In time, the widower falls ill and asks his sons-in-law to hunt for some fish brains for his health. Only the turtle son-in-law manages to find basketfuls of fish. Later, the man holds a buffalo competition and a horse-riding contest, which the turtle husband wins to her his wife's happiness and the jealousy of the other sisters. Sometime later, the human turtle husband has to depart on a journey to Laos to trade, and gives his wife an egg, a knife and a coconut. After he leaves, the girl's sisters invite their cadette to collect firewood and to buy salt, but she refuses. The third time, the group invite her to play on a swing. The sisters cut off the tree the swing is tied to, and the turtle's wife falls to her death. They dispose of the body by throwing it in the sea. However, the turtle's wife is swallowed by a fish and comes back to life inside the animal's belly. She gives birth to a son and cuts her way out of the fish's stomach. The egg hatches a rooster and the coconut sprouts into a giant coconut tree. She climbs up the tree as it grows, allowing her to see all the way to Laos. She tells the rooster to crow and call out for its master, so that the turtle husband can hear it. The turtle husband hears the crowing and makes a turn back home. As for his wife, the tree provides her with rice and coconut for her to drink. The turtle husband reunites with his wife and learns his sisters-in-law tried to kill her, so devises a plan to punish them. He hides his wife and child inside a basket, gives his son a needle for him to stick in whoever spies inside the basket, and goes back home. He lands on the village and his sisters-in-law go to meet him, offering to carry it. They spy inside the basket, but the turtle man's son stabs them in the eyes, turning one into a cat and another into a dog, which they keep as guardians.

=== The Gourd Son ===
Vietnamese folklorist Nguyễn Đổng Chi reported a tale from the Muong people with the title Chàng Bầu ("The Gourd Son"). In this tale, a childless couple long to have a child just like a gourd, so one is born to them. The woman tries to get rid of her son, but he begs her not to abandon him, for he can do the housework. The Gourd Son grows up and works as a buffalo herd for a man named Lang. Lang's daughters are tasked with bringing Gourd Boy food: the elder, A Lang, is afraid of the boy and places the food on near the forest entrance. The younger, Hai, brings him food. On one occasion, she goes to deliver him food and discovers a handsome young playing flute while lying on a hammock and surrounded by elaphants and tigers - it is the Gourd Son in human form. Hai consents to marriage to the Gourd Son, but her father asks him to provide an extravagant dowry: a herd of a hundred buffalos, another of nine-antlered deer, hards of herons and packs of tigers and leopards. The Gourd Son uses his magic to summon the dowry and marries Hai. The elder, A, spies on the newly wed couple and discovers her brother-in-law is handsome and can provide for them with his magic. Jealous, A devises a way to replace her sister: she invites her to wash their hair in the river and sets her adrift a boat. Hai washes away on an island and forages for food with a knife and a bamboo which she always carried with her. She builds a hut and hatches two eggs into roosters. The Gourd Son returns home and passes by the island his wife is on. The roosters crow to alert Gourd Son, he sails to the island and reunites with his wife. He takes her back with him, but hides her. A pretends to be Gourd Son's wife, but he exposes her when he brings Hai with him. A flees up the stairs, but the steps break, causing her to fall and become a mud-dweling creature. Hai also destroys her husband's disguise.

=== Channa Husband ===
Vietnamese folklorist Nguyễn Đổng Chi reported a similar tale, "very popular in the North" ("Bac", in the original), with the title Chàng Chuối ("Channa Husband"). In this tale, king Hung has a beautiful daughter named My Nuong, who is courted by two suitors, Son Tinh and Thuy Tinh (a water god). For this, the king sends the suitors to bring wedding gifts for her. Son Tinh is the victor and marries Mỵ Nương. However, Thuy Tinh leads his army to take Son Tinh, but loses. Eventually, he finds another girl and marries her, but leaves her on land with their son and returns to the Water Palace. Thủy Tình's mortal wife gives birth to a channa, a fish, which she raises in a basin, bearing the brunt of the world's mockery. One day, out of curiosity, the three daughters of a high-ranking official named Lý came to see the channa. The channa son falls in love with a human. One day, the channa son reveals his human form to his human mother, bearing royal regalia and a crown, and explains he is the son of an aquatic ruler of royal lineage. When he is older, the channa son asks his mother to court one of the daughters of the Ly family. The elder two daughters reject the fish suitor, save for the youngest, Lý Dung. For this, the Ly patriarch asks for a rich dowry, which the channa suitor provides by sending his mother to the river to ask his father: a pumpkin with the dowry and servants. The channa fish marries the youngest sister and alternates between human form at night and fish form during the day. He attends a temple festival in human form with his wife, who admits that the youth is her fish husband, raising the jealousy of his sisters-in-law for not marrying him. The king summons the now human channa youth to court and makes him a general, relocating him to guard the border. While he is away, the jealous sisters-in-law pay a visit to their sister, invite her to bathe and try to drown her by pushing her into the river. They believe their cadette is dead, but the water god saves his daughter-in-law and revives her. The channa youth returns home after his army duties and passes by a temple, where he meets his wife and learns that his sisters-in-law tried to kill her. He rescues his wife and hides her in a chest, then arrives home. His sisters-in-law feign grieving for their cadette and try to come on to him, when he opens up the chest and reveals his wife is safe and alive, after all. The elder sisters' deceit is publicly revealed and they are struck dead by lightning. The King of the Water Kingdom takes the channa prince and his wife underwater and crowns them prince and consort. The tale also exists as an anonymous Nôm story with the title Chàng Chuối tân truyện, which first appeared around the beginning of the Nguyễn dynasty and it was based on a folktale titled Sơn Tỉnh Thủy Tình.

Chi reports a second tale of the "Channa Husband" that is told by the people of Vinh Yen and Phu Tho: a woman steps on a strange footprint near a riverbank and becomes pregnant with the channa son. The channa son is born and raises in a basin. During a harvest festival, the channa turns into a human youth and goes to court three beautiful girls. He then asks his mother to court the girls on his behalf. The families ask for a large dowry in return, so the channa and his mother approach the river and she throws her son in the water. He returns with a pumpkin that provides trays of food and wedding gifts. During a time of the channa husband's absence, the heroine's sisters throw her off a bridge and into the water. The channa husband rescues his wife and throws his sisters-in-law in the river.

== See also ==
- Animal as Bridegroom
- King Iguana
- God of Waters (Sre folktale)

== Bibliography ==
- Bùi Mạnh Nhị (1988). "Sọ Dừa". Phân tích tác phẩm văn học dân gian (in Vietnamese). Sở Giáo dục An Giang. pp. 52–57.
- Парникель, Б.Б.. "Чамское предание о кокосовом орехе: миф или сказка?" In: Языки и лит. Дал. Востока и Юго-Вост. Азии: материалы конф., Санкт-Петербург, 18–20 янв., 1994. Сankt Пeterбurg: 1994. pp. 148–153.
- Nguyen, Xuan Thuy (2015). "Disability and Institutional Policy in Vietnam". The Journey to Inclusion. Studies in Inclusive Education. Rotterdam: SensePublishers. pp. 23–48. doi:10.1007/978-94-6300-304-9_2. ISBN 978-94-6300-304-9.
- Tran Quynh Ngoc Bui (2012). "Subjectivity and Ethnicity in Vietnamese Folktales with Metamorphosed Heroes". In John Stephens (ed.). Subjectivity in Asian Children's Literature and Film. Routledge. pp. 151–162. ISBN 9780203098646.
- Minina, I.D. (2024). "Заимствование и развитие сказочных сюжетов о чудесном герое в фольклоре народов Вьетнама" [Borrowing and Historical Evolution of Tales and Fables about the Wonderful Hero in the Folklore Traditions of Vietnamese Peoples]. The Russian Journal of Vietnamese Studies (in Russian). 8 (1): 110–124. doi:10.54631/VS.2024.81-626077.
- Yui Nguyễn (29 September 2022). "Vietnam's Cultural Diversity via 3 Versions of Sọ Dừa in Kinh, Chăm, Raglai Folklore". Saigoneer.
- Earl, Catherine (2022). "Becoming Middle-class and Affluent in Globalizing Urban Vietnam". In Shih-Wen Sue Chen; Sin Wen Lau (eds.). Representations of Children and Success in Asia: Dream Chasers. Taylor & Francis. pp. 212–232. doi:10.4324/9781003301370-18. ISBN 9781000624472.
- Nguyễn Đổng Chi [in Vietnamese] (2000). "128. Lấy chồng dê". Kho Tàng Truyện Cổ Tích Việt Nam (in Vietnamese). Vol. I (Part 1 - Part 2 - Part 3). NHÀ XUẤT BẢN GIÁO DỤC. pp. 907–940.
- CHU XUÂN DIỄN (2004) [1984]. "Sọ Dừa". In Đỗ Đức Hiểu; Nguyễn Huệ Chi; Phùng Văn Tửu; Trần Hữu Tá (eds.). Từ điển Văn học [Dictionary of literature] (in Vietnamese). Hà Nội: NXB Thế giới. pp. 1547–1548.
