= The Golden Starfruit Tree =

Vietnamese folktale

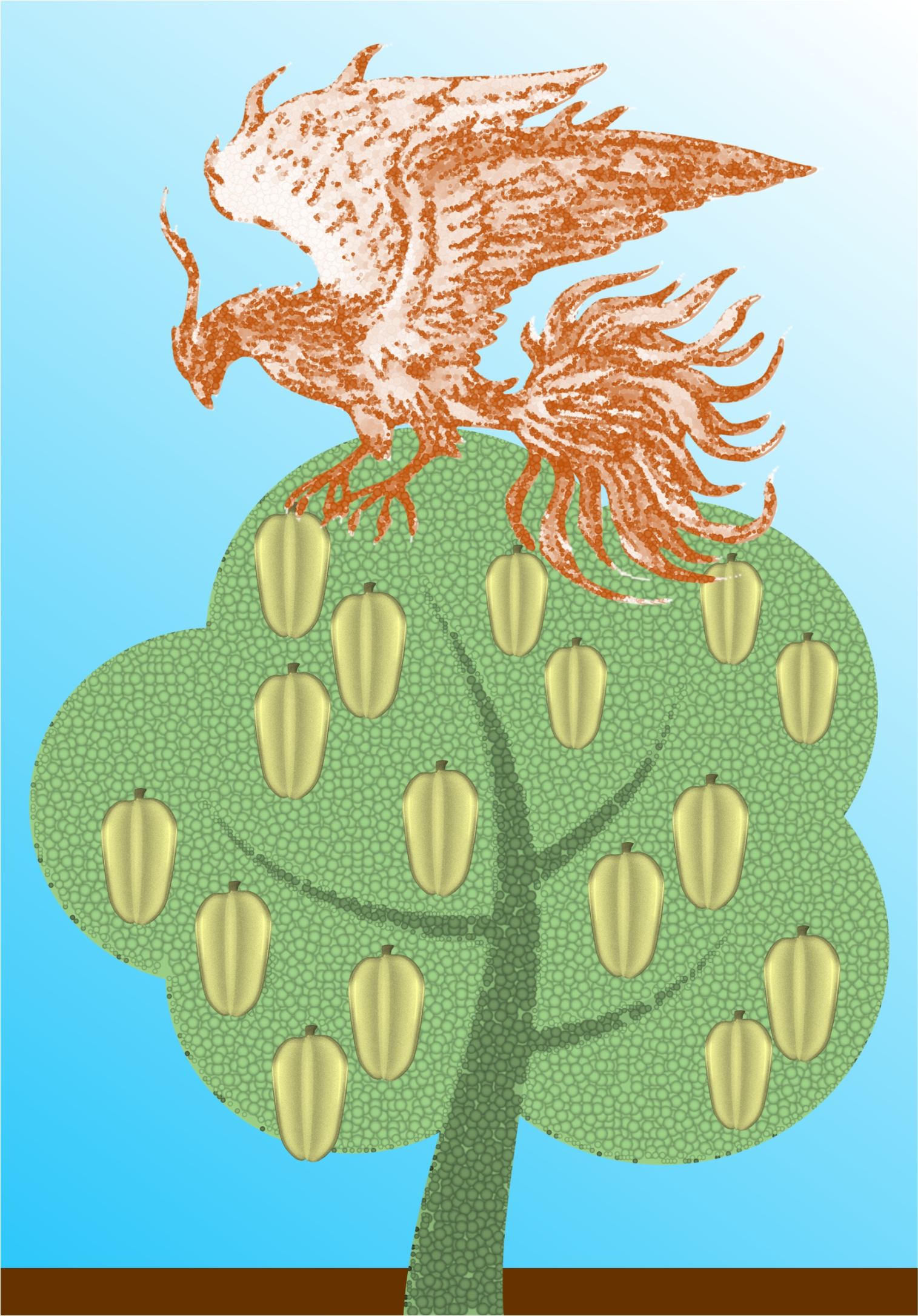
- An illustration of the starfruit tree and the magical bird

Folk tale
- Name: The Golden Starfruit Tree
- Country: Vietnam
- Origin Date: 1934
- Published in: Truyện cổ nước Nam by Nguyễn Như Ngọc; Kho tàng truyện cổ tích Việt Nam by Nguyễn Đổng Chi

The Golden Starfruit Tree (Vietnamese: Ăn khế trả vàng, lit. 'Eating starfruit and paying with gold' or simply Vietnamese: Cây khế, lit. 'The starfruit tree') is a Vietnamese folktale. It tells the story of a poor farmer who is paid handsomely by a magical bird after letting it feed on his starfruit tree, and his rich older brother who perishes from his own greediness.

== Story ==
The most known variant of the story can be summarized as follows:

In a certain village, there was a rich man with two sons. After the man died, the younger son was kind and hard-working. But the older son was lazy and greedy. When they were older and got married, the sons split their father's fortune. The greedy older son took most of the fortune, leaving his kind younger brother with just a starfruit tree. The younger son took care of the tree and it soon became laden with fruit.

One day, a magical bird appeared (a phoenix or a raven in different variants) and ate the fruit. When the owner complained, the bird told him "Eating a starfruit, paying back a piece of gold. Making a three-span pouch to carry them". He couldn't understand what was happening but he still did it. Next day, the bird returned and took the young man to an island full of precious gold to fill his pouch. Thanks to the bird, the younger son became extremely rich.

Seeing his brother's newfound wealth, the older son demanded to exchange the starfruit tree with his own fortune. The younger son agreed, and the older son became a farmer living next to the tree. The magical bird returned and told him the same thing as it told his younger sibling, but the greedy older son instead made a much bigger pouch, collecting much more gold than what the bird could handle. On their returning trip, the bird told the older son to drop some of the gold, but he denied. Out of anger, the bird dropped the man into the sea, ending his life.

== Origin and variants ==
The first variant of the story was collected by scholar Nguyễn Như Ngọc in the first volume of his Truyện cổ nước Nam (lit. 'Southern country's ancient tales'). In this variant, the phoenix simply vomits out another starfruit tree, whose flowers are made of silver and fruits made of gold. When the older brother obtains the starfruit tree, no phoenix appears and he is mocked by ravens. Vietnamese folklorist Nguyễn Đổng Chi in his Kho tàng truyện cổ tích Việt Nam (lit. 'Vietnam's collection of folktales') included various Vietnamese and Hmong variants of the story under the title of "A man dies for wealth, a bird dies for food" (人為財死，鳥為食亡), which is a proverb based on a similar Chinese folktale.

== Adaptions ==
The Golden Starfruit Tree is one of Vietnamese fairy tales adapted by Cổ tích Việt Nam (lit. 'Vietnamese fairy tales'), a VHS series directed by Nguyễn Minh Chung based on Nguyễn Đổng Chi's folklore collection. The episode was released in 1993, featuring Hồng Tơ, Tô Kiều Lan, Hoàng Thơi and Kim Anh.

== See also ==
- Tsarevitch Ivan, the Firebird and the Gray Wolf - a similar Russian folktale about a magical bird feeding on a fruit tree.
