= The Story of the Hamadryad =

Arakanese folktale about a snake bridegroom

The Story of the Hamadryad (Arakanese: ငန်းတော်ရှည်ဝတ္ထု; Ngan-daw-shay Watthu) or The Snake Prince (Burmese: မြွေမင်းသား) is a folktale from the Arakanese people, collected by researcher San Shwe Bu and published in the Journal of the Burma Research Society.

The tale is related to the international cycle of the Animal as Bridegroom, wherein a heroine marries a husband in animal form who reveals he is man underneath. In this case, the heroine marries a husband in animal shape that becomes human, while another girl marries a real animal and dies. Variants of the narrative are located in India and Southeast Asia.

== Summary ==
An old widow has three beautiful daughters who she hopes to marry to grandees and princes, and always does the heavy chores at home herself, like fetching firewood and catching fish. One day, she takes a wicker basket to the river to catch some fish, but none appears, save for a snake that slithers into the basket. The widow takes the basket home with her to kill the snake later, and leaves it in a corner. Meanwhile, the snake slithers off to a jar of condiment.

Some days later, the widow goes to fetch condiment for her food and the snake coils around her arm. The widow offers her three daughters to the animal, but it only reacts to the youngest one, releasing the woman's arm. The youngest daughter lives goes with the snake to a room, which takes off the snakeskin to become a human youth, since he is in fact a nat, then returns to his snake form in the morning. This goes on for many nights, until, one day, the elder sisters question her how she can live with a reptile as a husband, and the girl answers he is not snake at all, but a handsome youth underneath it. The elder sisters convince her to burn the snakeskin one night, which she does; despite some physical pain, the nat husband is content with assuming a definite human form.

Some time later, he creates a palace for his wife with his powers, and decides to sail on a journey to learn a trade. After he prepares his provisions for the voyage, he warns his wife, pregnant at this time, not to leave his palace, then departs. While he is away, her elder sisters, jealous of her fortune, plot to get rid of her: they try to convince her to catch fish with them, then to break firewood - which she refuses - and to play with them on a swing over a river - which she agrees to do. The girl goes to the swing and her elder sisters shove her into the river. Fortunately for her, a couple of big storks sight her and rescue her to their nest atop a tree.

Meanwhile, thinking their cadette is dead, the sisters take over the palace. Back to the girl, she gives birth to a son, who the storks consider as their child, and she rocks the baby with a song. Months pass, the human nat docks the ship in the harbour, when he hears his wife's voice. Tracking it to the nearby tree, he reaches the storks' nest and finds her. The giant storks are reluctant to part with the mother and child they protected in their nest, but the nat husband offers to give them a pile of fish as reward for saving his family. He hides his wife and son in a box and takes to his palace, then pretends to fall for his sisters-in-law's lies that his wife died. During some days, the nat gives meals in secret to his wife in his room, and a raven appears at the window to sing some mocking verses to him and the two elder sisters. After the raven's mocking, the nat decides to shame the women: he gathers people for a rich feast, and bids his sisters-in-law relate to the guests the sorry story about their sister's death, all the while, the nat opens the chest and takes his wife and son to the dining room, to the guests' astonishment and the sisters-in-law's shame. The nat and his family live happily together.

Meanwhile, in the same village where the widow lived with her three daughters, another old woman learns of the girl's fortunate marriage with a snake, and decides to find her daughter a similar animal, hoping she will experience fortune and riches. The woman finds a boa constrictor and places it in the same room as her daughter. That same night, the animal wakes up and begins to devour her little by little. The girl cries for her mother's help, but the woman dismisses them as just her "husband" decorating her with jewels. The next morning, the woman enters her daughter's room and finds the snake swallowed her during the night.

== Analysis ==
=== Tale type ===
The tale is classified in the international Aarne-Thompson-Uther Index as AaTh 433C, "The Serpent Husband and The Jealous Girl", a subtype of type AaTh 433, "The Prince as Serpent". In this tale type, a girl marries a snake who gives her jewels and ornaments and becomes human after the burning of his snakeskin; another girl tries to imitate with a real snake, with disastrous and fatal results.

However, in his own revision of the folk type index, published in 2004, German folklorist Hans-Jörg Uther subsumed types AaTh 433 ("The Prince as Serpent"), AaTh 433A ("A Serpent Carries a Princess to Its Castle") and AaTh 433C under a new type: ATU 433B, "King Lindworm".

=== Motifs ===
Professor Stuart Blackburn stated that some Southeast Asian variants contain the motif of the fruit tree owned by the snake, whose fruits either the sisters or their mother want. More specifically, it is found in central Arunachal Pradesh, and among the Kucong and Nusu people of Yunnan.

Type 433C also contains the motif J2415.7, "A snake for the real daughter. Stepdaughter, married to a snake, appears decorated with jewels. Stepmother desires a snake be procured for her daughter. She is swallowed instead".

According to Reginald Dennis Burton, in Upper Burma, the word Ngan or Ngan-bok refers to the king cobra, and Ngan-daw-gya (among other names) refers to the banded krait species.

== Variants ==
=== Distribution ===
In his 1961 revision of the tale type index, American folklorist Stith Thompson indicated 5 variants of the type, found only in India. Hence, Thompson and Warren Roberts's work Types of Indic Oral Tales links this tale type "exclusively" to South Asia. In addition, according to professor Stuart Blackburn, this is the "Asian" version of the snake-husband story, and variants of the narrative (girl marries snake and is fortunate; jealous girl marries another snake and dies) are reported in India (in Nagaland and Assam), Southeast Asia, China, and among Tibeto-Burman speakers in central Arunachal Pradesh and the extended eastern Himalayas (e.g., the Apatani, Nyishi people, Tagin people, Garo people and Lisu people). Taiwanese scholarship also locates variants of subtype 433C in Cambodia and Indonesia.

=== Burma ===
In another article, San Shwe Bu stated that the "story of the Hamadryad", beside the Arakan people, was also "familiar" to the Burmese.

==== The Snake Prince (Arakan) ====
Bernard Houghton published in the journal Indian Antiquary a tale from the Arakanese people that he translated from a Burmese manuscript furnished by a Maung Tha Bwin, Myôôk of Sandoway. In this tale, titled The Snake Prince, a man named Sakkaru, from fairy-land (Tâwatinsa), is reborn in the human realm in the form of a hamadryad (a spirit that lives in a tree), by orders of King Sakrâ (Indra). In the human realm, a washerwoman is washing her clothes in the river and sees a serpent (the hamadryad) atop a fig tree. She wants some of the figs, and offers one of her daughters, named Dwê Pyû, to the snake, in exchange for some figs. The serpent wags its tail and knocks down many figs. The washerwoman gets the figs and in jest exhorts the snake to follow her home to get his bride Dwê Pyû. The snake decides to follow the woman home. The next morning, the washerwoman is hungry and sticks her hand in a pot to grab some rice to cook, when the snake coils around her arm. It dawns on the woman that the snake is there to get his bride, so she convinces the snake to let her go, while she summons her daughter Dwê Pyû to meet the snake husband. The girl reluctantly agrees to live with the snake as husband and wife. One day, King Sakrâ summons Sakkaru (the snake) to a council in his realm, so Sakkaru leaves behind the snakeskin on his bed and goes to Tâwatinsa. His human wife, Dwê Pyû, sees the snakeskin and, believing her snake husband is dead, cries to her mother. The mother tells her daughter to burn the snakeskin as a sort of funeral rite, so they throw the snakeskin in the fireplace. Sakkaru returns to the human realm and complains that he felt some burning sensation. The washerwoman and Dwê Pyû realize who he is and rejoice, while the washerwoman's other daughter, named Shwê Kyên, begins to curse her sister's good luck. That night, fairy Samâ-Dêva visits Sakkaru and gives him a magic wand, and warns him that no drop of snake's blood can touch his skin, lest he becomes a snake again, and that, after receiving the wand, Sakkaru is to wander through other countries. The next day, Sakkaru departs on a ship, leaving behind a pregnant wife. Seizing this opportunity, Shwê Kyên tries to get rid of her sister (who is pregnant at the time) by shoving her into the river, but she is saved by a great eagle and taken to a silk-cotton tree. On returning from his trip, Sakkaru sees this wife with a son atop the tree and barters with the eagle, who is his brother: he will deliver a heap of fish to the bird and it will send mother and son down the tree. Seeing that her plans failed, Shwê Kyên asks her father, the washerwoman's husband, to bring her a snake from the jungle, hoping to experience the same luck as her sister. Her father captures a large boa constrictor and gives to Shwê Kyên. That night, the girl begins to scream that the boa is devouring her; her father dismisses any danger, but Dwê Pyû begs her husband, the Snake Prince Sakkaru, to save her sister. Sakkaru warns his wife that any drop of snake's blood will turn him back to a snake. He goes to Shwê Kyên's room and kills the boa-constrictor, but a drop of its blood touches his skin and he becomes a snake again, with a snake's mind. Sakkaru, back to serpentine form, tells his wife to take care of their son. Despite Dwê Pyû's pleas for him to stay with them, he slithers back to the forest.

==== The Tree-Snake Prince ====
Author John Nisbet published a Burmese tale with the title The Tree-Snake Prince, which he sourced as an "abbreviated form of an Arakanese legend". In this tale, Sakaru is identified as a Nat (deity, spirit) who lives in Tawadeingtha, a spirit-land. To atone for evil deeds, he is sent to Earth for three months by Thagyá Min in the form of a snake, to be a guardian spirit living in a wild fig-tree. Nearby, lives a human family: a fisherman, his wife and two daughters, Shwe Kyin and Dwe Pyu. The mother goes with her daughters to wash clothes at the river, and, on the road back, stops to rest by a fig tree, atop of which she sees the animal. In jest she asks for the serpent to throw her some figs, and she will marry it to Dwe Pyu if it can throw her some figs. The snake complies, shakes the tree and many fruits fall from it. She takes the fruits with her and mockingly suggests the snake comes for a visit, but on the road, Dwe Pyu chides her to let the animal follow them, and the woman bribes a stump and an anthill to lie to the snake. After they depart, the snake goes after them to the fisherman's house and hides in a rice pot. The next day, the fisherman's wife goes to fetch some rice and the snake coils around her arm. Remembering her promise to the snake, she allows Dwe Pyu to go with the snake. The girl goes to live with the snake, but fears for her life. Some time later, the deities are convening in Tawadeingtha, and the Sakaru, shedding its skin, joins its divine companions in human form, leaving behind the snakeskin. Dwe Pyu wakes up one night and finds only the snakeskin. Thinking her animal husband is dead, she and her mother burn the shed skin, and Sakaru, at a distance, senses a burning within his body, then materializes right in front of Dwe Pyu. The girl recognizes him as hs husband, to her great joy, and her sister's jealousy. Later, a "Samadeva spirit" appears to Sakaru, gifts him a magic wand, warning him that he should not let a drop of snake's blood fall on his body, then Sakaru is to travel to other lands. The next day, he uses the wand to summon a ship to travel alone, and leaves a pregnant Dwe Pyu alone with her sister. While Sakaru is away, Shwe Kyin shoves her younger sister down a river, despite her pleas, and traces a plan to have Sakaru for herself. Meanwhile, a fish eagle rescues Dwe Pyu and takes her to a "lofty tree", where she gives birth to her son. Some time later, Sakaru is returning from his voyage and finds his wife atop the lofty tree, and thanks the eagle for rescuing his family. Sakaru decides to shame his sister-in-law: he hides his wife and his son in a chest, then goes home, feigns ignorance about her misdeeds, and tells her he brought gifts in a chest. Shwe Kyin goes to open the chest and out spring her sister and her nephew. Ashamed, she leaves Dwe Pyu to her devices and returns home to ask her father to find her a similar tree-snake husband, believing she will have the same luck as her younger sister. Her father brings her a large tree-python. She spends the night with the python and it devours her. Dwe Pyu learns about this and begs her husband to save her sister, despite her previous actions. Sakaru warns her to not let any drop of snake's blood fall on him, lest he becomes a snake. Sakaru kills the python with his sword, but a drop of its blood falls on him, turning him back into a snake. Dwe Pyu cries for her husband, and Sakaru alternates moments of human conscience and animal instinct, opting to wait in the forest whenever his animal mind takes over. Eventually, Thagyá Min's deadline is lifted and he turns back to human shape to live with his wife and son.

==== The Snake Prince (Burma) ====
Burmese scholar Maung Htin Aung published a Burmese tale titled The Snake Prince. In this tale, a poor widow goes to the river bank to collect figs to earn money. One day, she notices a snake on the tree and asks the reptile if it wants to marry one of her daughters, in exchange for the figs. The snake drops all figs at the marriage proposal with the widow's youngest daughter, Mistress Youngest. The widow gets the figs and runs all the way home. The snake follows her and coils around the woman's body. The woman pleads to release her as she renews her proposals. The snake uncoils itself at the mention of the third daughter. The widow asks her daughters to comply with the snake, but only the youngest accepts. She and the snake marry, and they sleep at night, the maiden on her bed, the snake on a basket nearby. The maiden tells her mother that she has been having strange dreams about a handsome man that comes at night to their bed. That night, her mother spies the snake taking off his snakeskin and becoming a man. She seizes the opportunity to take the skin and burn it. The prince complains about his body burning, but his wife throws a pot of water on him. The tale continues with two variations on the follow-up: a good ending, and a tragic one. In the tragic ending, the heroine's elder sisters become jealous of her good fortune, and ask their mother to bring them a snake to marry. The Snake Prince, now human, warns them that, now that he is human, his snake companions may not recognize him, and that not every snake will become a prince. The elder sisters still insist to marry a serpent and their mother brings from the forest a huge python and gives it to her elder daughter. That night, the large python, feeling hungry, slithers out of the basket and begins to devour the girl. She begins to scream that she is being devoured, but her mother thinks she is being facetious about being decorated by her husband, but in the morning sees that her daughter was devoured. She begs her son-in-law, the Snake Prince, to save her daughter, but the Snake Prince warns that no drop of the snake's blood may touch his skin. The mother continues to beg him, and he kills the snake and opens its belly, rescuing a still alive girl. However, the snake's blood splatters on his hand and he becomes a snake again. He then slithers back to the forest. In a review, scholar Kristina Lindell noted that the Burmese tale had "the same idea" as the Kammu tales she collected: girl marries snake and becomes prosperous; another girl finds snake to marry and dies. According to researchers Gerry Abbott and Khin Thant Han, the tale is "widely known" in Burma, with either ending (the tragic one or the happy one).

==== Ma Htwe Lay and the Snake Prince ====
In a Burmese tale titled Ma Htwe Lay and the Snake Prince, an old woman with three daughters goes to a fig tree (tha phan) to fetch fruits for her family. One day, however, she goes to the tree and cannot find any figs on the ground, and the next day also. She suddenly hears a sound up the tree and sees a snake there. She offers marrying one of her daughters to the snake if the animal tosses some fruits to her: on hearing the proposal to the woman's elder daughters, it tosses her a single fruit, but when it hears the youngest, the reptile shakes the tree to give her all of the fruits. The woman takes the fruits with her and goes back home; on the way, a tree stump and a cowboy see her with the figs and ask to be given one. Back to the snake, it follows the woman home and sees the tree stump on the path, which, in fear, points to the woman's house, where the snakes slithers to and hides itself in a rice pot. When the woman goes to get some rice to cook, the snake coils around her hand. The woman then repeats the marriage offer to one of her daughters, and the snake releases her hand at the mention of the youngest daughter. Soon, the woman consults with her three daughters to see who will marry the snake: the elder two refuse, save for Ma Htwe Lay (which means 'youngest daughter'). The girl and the snake settle into their married life. At night, the snake sleeps in a bamboo basket, and Ma Htwe Lay has dreams about a handsome prince coming to her side at night. Her mother promises to investigate into her dreams, and decides to spy on her room at night: she discovers a prince comes out of the bamboo basket to sleep by Ma Htwe Lay's side. The woman then creeps into the room, takes the snakeskin and burns it to keep her son-in-law human forever. The prince, whom the village calls "Snake Prince", remains human, and builds a life together with Ma Htwe Lay, even having a child with her. However, Snake Prince reveals his wife a secret: the blood of a snake cannot touch his skin. Some time later, the elder daughters pester their mother to find her husbands, and the woman brings home a snake she finds in the forest. That same night, the second snake wakes up and begins to swallow the eldest daughter. She complains to her mother that she is being slowly devoured, but the woman dismisses it as teasing. The next morning, the woman finds the snake with the swollen belly and realizes her daughter is inside it. The woman then pleads for the Snake Prince to save her. Despite some reluctance on his part, even divulging his secret, his mother-in-law insists and he takes a knife in the kitchen. The snake's belly is cut open and the elder daughter is rescued, barely alive. However, the snake's blood splashes on the Snake Prince and he turns back into a snake. Ma Htwe Lay laments the fact; the Snake Prince tells her he can never return to the human world, and slithers off to the forest. Ma Htwe Lay follows her husband into the forest. However, as her husband has become a snake, it tries to bite her, but hesitates when Ma Htwe Lay shows the reptile their son. The snake makes its way back to the forest, Ma Htwe Lay behind it, and they disappear from sight.

==== The Dragon Groom (Kachin) ====
In a Kachin tale titled Baren Shabrang, collected in Myanmar and translated as The dragon groom, a mother and daughter go to pluck banana leaves in the forest, when a snake blocks their path. They shoo the snake away, but the animal follows them, since it has fallen in love with the girl. The snake removes its skin to become a human youth and spends the nights with the girl, while his snakeskin becomes gold in the morning, making the girl and her mother very rich. One day, the girl reveals the snake's secret, and her mother urges her to burn the snakeskin while the youth is asleep. At midnight, the girl does as instructed and burns the snakeskin. The youth remains human, although he is a snake ("a spiritual one", as the text explains). A neighbour becomes jealous of the mother and daughter's fortune and asks them how they became rich. The mother reveals she went to the forest to pick banana leaves and found a snake that turned into a human youth. The neighbour decides to replicate and fetches a snake in the forest which she brings to her own daughter. She locks the snake, which is a real animal, in her daughter's room and it slowly devours the girl. As she shouts she is being devoured bit by bit, the woman dismisses her daughter's pleas for help and looks forward to any gold she may find in the morning. However, when she enters her daughter's room, there is only a sleeping snake, and no gold, nor daughter.

=== Southeast Asia ===
==== Indonesia ====
===== The tale of the python-snake =====
Author J. A. T. Schwarz collected a Tomtenboan tale titled Sislsiléii an doro' i Tumotongko' kaapa Kumĕkĕsan, translated into Dutch as Verhaal van de Python-Slang (English: "The tale of the python-snake"). In this tale, a python-snake slithers to a widow's house in the village and asks to be adopted by her. The widow agrees, and the snake makes a request: go to the king and propose on his behalf to one of the king's five daughters. The widow goes to the palace and explains the python-snake's request. The king asks his five daughters which will go marry the snake: the elder princesses refuse, save for the youngest princess, who agrees to marry the animal. The king then says that whoever marries one of his daughters shall become king after him, and the python-snake assumes the throne. The youngest princess later discovers the python-snake is in fact man underneath the snakeskin, and comments about it to the other princesses. The eldest princess, then, decides to have the same luck as her cadette: she sends for servants to find her a python-snake suitor in the forest, and goes with the snake to her room. The next day, they discover that the snake devoured her.

==== Thailand ====
===== The Black Crow =====
In a tale collected from a informant named Phon Homdee, in Ban Nai village, Central Thailand, and translated as The Black Crow, a rich man with no family wishes to marry and have children, so he consults with an astrologer to divine his future. The astrologer points to a girl in a village, and prophesizes their son will "travel in the air". The astrologer's prediction comes true and the man's son is born: a black crow that can shapeshift. The man, in return, has promised to look after the astrologer, but, since a crow was born to him, he failed to keep his promise. Thus, the jealous astrologer gives another prophecy: the crow son will bring them misfortune. Following the astrologer's words, the man abandons the crow son on a raft. The crow's raft docks in an isle, where an old couple live and grow crops of sugar cane and watermelons. Hungry, the crow eats the watermelons for some days, to the old couple's dismay. They capture the crow, but he begins to talk and asks to live with them. Some time later, the crow, while in flight, spies on the three daughters of a millionaire, and tells his adoptive parents he wishes to marry the middle daughter. The old woman goes to talk to the millionaire, who refuses twice, but agrees on the third time, requesting a pile of silver and a lump of gold. On the wedding day, the crow brings watermelons filled with gold and silver, and marries the middle daughter. During the night, he takes off the crowskin to become human, and wears it again in the morning, until one day he abandons the crow disguise when he has to bathe. Later, the millionaire's wife and the unmarried daughters (the eldest and the youngest) go to pluck some wild mangoes from a very tall mango tree. The daughter promises to marry the man that can fetch her and her mother the mangoes. Suddenly, a luam snake (boa) comes out of the forest and offers his help, interested in marrying the woman's daughter. He climbs up the tree and shakes a branch to give them a loadful of mangoes. The woman and her daughters go back home with the fruits, the luam snake trailing behind them. The story then explains that this snake can also shapeshift between human and serpentine forms, and marries the youngest daughter. Realizing her younger daughters are now married, the woman decides to find a husband for her elder, and brings a real luam snake back home with her, and locks the animal in her elder's room. That same night, the snake wakes up and begins to swallow the elder daughter little by little; the elder daughter complains she is being devoured, but her mother dismisses it as a husband's caresses. After the snake eats, it escapes the room to lie under the woman's fence. The next morning, the woman's sons-in-law, the crow and the luam snake, come out of the house in their animal shapes, and wonder why their brother-in-law is locked in its room. A random crow flies in and sings to the woman about a snake by the fence. The woman comments on the bird's strange song, and goes to check on her elder daughter, but finds no one in the room. She then goes outside and finds the real snake under the fence. The tale ends.

==== Kammu people ====
Scholars Kristina Lindell, Jan-Öjvind Swahn and Damrong Tayanin collected a tale from a Kammu storyteller named Mr. Cendii. In his tale, titled Miss Sənlooy or Miss Snlòoy, an old woman has seven daughters, Miss Sənlooy being the youngest. The family makes a dam in a stream so they can fish in it. One day, however, the dam bursts, and the old woman promises to marry one of his daughters to anyone who can build a dam for them. A python snake offers to make the dam, and demands Miss Sənlooy as his wife. Despite some reluctance, the girl is forced to go with the python. They move out to the python's house. Later, he takes off the snakeskin and goes to bathe in the river as a human being. Miss Sənlooy does not recognize him as her husband, and he has to show some of his scales under his arms. They live in happiness and with many riches. One of her mother's neighbours decides to have her daughter experience the same fortune as Miss Sənlooy, so she fetches a python from the forest, carries it home with her and hopes it marries her daughter. After some days, the neighbour locks the python with her daughter. As the serpent wakes up, it is hungry, and coils around the girl to devour her. The girl cries in despair for her parents to save her, but her parents do nothing. The next day, they find their daughter has been swallowed whole.

Lindell, Swahn and Tayanin collected a similar tale from a Kammu teller named Léɛŋ. In this tale, titled A Real, Genuine Python, an old woman, seeing the fortune of another old woman (whose snake son-in-law turned into a dragon or human male), decides to find one for her daughter, so she goes to the forest with a basket. A large snake falls into the basket to be brought to the old woman's house, and is locked up in the old woman's daughter's room. The snake wakes up and begins to swallow the girl slowly: first her knees, then her waist, next her chest. The girl complains to her mother she is being devoured, but her mother dismisses her complaints, until the girl is swallowed whole by the snake, who slithers away to the forest. The next morning, the old woman cannot find her daughter nor the snake, and asks the village for help. After a while, a crow gives them the whereabouts of the snake: near the stem of a banana plant. The old woman and the villagers go to the snake and force it to vomit the girl, still alive, then they kill the snake. The three scholars noted that the story is the "second part", a continuation of a first half where a girl marries a python who turns into a 'dragon' (a human male) that provides fortune and good luck for his human wife and her mother.

=== China ===
==== Two Sisters and the Boa ====
In a tale from the Kucong people, collected in Yunnan and published in 1982, then translated as Two Girls and the Boa, a binbai ('old woman') buries her husband, and has to take care of her two daughters, the elder nineteen, the younger seventeen. One day, she is returning from the mountains and goes to rest under a mango tree bearing delicious fruit. Suddenly, she hears a rustling sound up the tree, and, thinking there is someone up there, she jokingly asks the person on the tree crown to throw some mangoes for her, and they can choose one of her daughters for wife. The mysterious person agrees, and shakes the branches for some to fall on her. She eats the mangoes and looks up to thank her mysterious helper: a large boa coiled on the tree. On seeing the animal, she hurries back home. Later that night, she goes outside to lock the chicken in the coop, when she finds the same boa inside the chicken coop. The boa begins to talk and demands one of her daughters, just as she promised earlier. The old woman goes back home and asks her daughters which is willing to go with the boa and become its bride: the elder refuses, but the youngest decides to sacrifice herself for their sake. She marries the boa and later goes with him to a cave in the mountains. Inside the cave, she gropes the darkness, until she reaches a large and splendid palace, filled with gold, jewels and silk. Then, she turns to the boa, and sees a young man at her side. The young man explains he is the king of the snakes of the region and, one day, when he was "on tour through the snake tribes", saw the girl and her sister, and decided to marry either of them. Feeling calmer, the girl lives with the young man a luxurious life, until one day, she decides to return home to pay her family a visit. Once there, she tells her elder sister and her mother about her marital life, and goes back home. The elder sister, feeling jealous, decides to look in the jungle for a boa to marry, in hopes of having the same good fortune. She returns home with a boa in a basket and goes to her room. Suddenly, the boa begins to devour her little by little, until there is only a lock of hair visible. The binbai, sensing something wrong, enters her daughter's room with a torch and discovers that the boa devoured her. She casts the torch on the boa, which explodes in many pieces, and takes her daughter's bones to bury them. Lastly, she ventures into the jungle looking for her younger daughter and her snake husband.

==== Yu Duo and her Snake Husband ====
In a tale from the Thai Lue people, collected in Yunnan with the title Yu Duo and her Snake Husband, a poor girl named Yu Duo is taken in by the family of a man named Xi Ti as their slave. Yu Duo never saw the man himself, but Xi Ti's wife and daughter mistreat the girl. Yu Duo is hardworking, and has to perform double the tasks for the family, since Xi Ti's daughter, Xiang Han, is fat and lazy. In time, she is also forced to climb the mountain and gather firewood for them. One day, Yu Duo is still in the mountain fetching firewood, but exherts herself and stops to rest under a mango tree. She looks up at the tree crown and sees delicious fruits she wants to eat, thus she declares she will marry whomever gets her the fruits. Suddenly, a voice hisses from up the tree: a large and heavy snake. The girl is scared at first, but the snake assuages it is different from other animals. Yu Duo trusts the snake and it fulfills her request, and they marry. The girl brings the snake home with her, to Xi Ti's wife and daughter's horror, who convince Xi Ti to banish Yu Duo from home. Despite lacking a house, the snake husband comforts its wife, and they being to live together in a straw hut. One night, the snake reveals to her he was a human named She Lang, Prince of Magic Snake, who one day was cursed into a serpentine form by a witch, but Yu Duo can help him to regain his former shape: they must not eat nothing for five days, then they must journey across seven mountains and bathe in a certain river. Yu Duo agrees to this penance, and both journey to the river. The snake tells Yu Duo to bathe downstream, while he bathes upstream, and the girl must not touch anything that she sees drifting down the river. They enter the river at separate points, and Yu Duo spots a silver belt, then silver and golden bowls floating down the river. She remembers her husband's words, but accidentally touches one of the golden bowls and her arm shrinks. She cries for help and a youth appears to help her: it is her husband in human form, now released from the snake shape. She Lang draws out her arm out of her shoulder and restores her. When they go back to their straw hut, their humble house has become a golden building. They live in happiness and wealth. Meanwhile, back to Xi Ti's family, his wife and daughter become jealous of Yu Duo's fortune, and the woman orders Xiang Han to replicate her success. Thus, Xiang Han fetches a large snake in the mountains and brings it home. Hoping that snake will grant them riches, the woman orders her daughter to sleep with the snake in her room. That same night, the snake begins to slowly devour Xiang Han, who cries for her mother's help, but the woman simply dismisses her complaints and believes the snake is caressing her. After the girl is swallowed, the woman goes to check on her daughter the next morning and finds only the snake in her bed.

==== The Boa and the Mango Tree ====
In a tale sourced from China and titled The Boa and the Mango Tree, an old woman has two daughters. One day, she stops to rest under a mango tree and wishes to have one to eat. She hears some rustling in the branches and asks whoever is up the tree to toss her a fruit, promising to marry one of her daughter to them. A fruit falls into her lap and she eats it. The woman asks the person to reveal themselves, and a large boa slithers down the tree. The woman is afraid at first, but the snake replies it wants to marry one of the girls. The woman returns home and asks her daughter which will go with the snake: the elder refuses, but the youngest agrees. The youngest accompanies the boa to a large tree deep in the forest, where they enter. The girl finds a large underground kingdom, and finds the python has transformed into a handsome youth, who explains he is a serpent king. Later, the youngest visits her family and tells them of her surprise, to her elder's jealousy. Deciding to have the same luck as her cadette, the elder enters the forest and captures a python into a basket, then returns home with the snake. She tells her mother she will spend some time with her new "husband" in her room. To her dismay, the serpent she brought home is a real animal, and soon enough begins to devour the girl part by part (knees, then waist, lastly neck), until she is no more. The next morning, the woman goes to check on her elder daughter and finds no trace either of her or of the serpent.

=== Other regions ===
==== Asia ====
In a variant from the Dhimal language, collected from an informant in Sāno Bāhraghare, in Āṭhiyābārī, with the title The Snake Husband, an old man has five daughters. They all go to a kase tree to pluck kase fruits. Suddenly, a snake appears and threatens the man in giving one of his daughters as wife. The man asks his five daughters which will go with the snake, but only the youngest agrees to do so. The youngest goes with the snake and they reach a large and expensive house. The eldest daughter asks her father to arrange a snake husband for her also. He brings a snake for her and it bites her to death.

In a tale from the Hmong people titled The Prince Snake and the Three Sisters, a king orders his three daughters to take care of a snake: the elder two refuse, but the youngest agrees and takes it as her pet. One day, the snake announces it will go to the river and will dive in the water; some coloured bubbles will foam at the surface, but the red one are the only ones she can touch. The princess waits for the snake, all the while yellow, green and red bubbles emerge. After some time, a man comes out of the water; he was the snake, now turned into a man. The princess's elder sisters become jealous of her good fortune and ask her how she found the snake prince. The third princess tells them to venture into the forest and touch the first snake they find, and the snake will turn into a prince. The elder sisters follow her instructions, touch a snake in the forest and die.

In a tale from the Dusun Brunei translated as Tuan Pute and the python (Dusun: Tuan pute na lanut ndolon), a girl named Dayang Bongsu finds a water-melon and wraps a cloth around it. As the weeks pass, the girl finds a little snake on the fruit, brings it home and puts it in a box. The little snake begins to grow until it turns into a human youth, which is given the name "Yawang Bincuan, Son-of-Snakes". Yawang Bincuan then marries Dayang Bongsu. Later, her elder sister, Tuan Pute, decides to find herself a snake husband in the jungle, by looking under the nibong palm. She finds one and brings it home. She makes a wedding meal for themselves and retires with the animal to their room. Then, the snake begins to slowly devour Tuan Pute, first, by her feet, and going up to her knees, waist, breasts and throat. The girl tries to cry for her mother's help, but the woman dismisses her daughter's complaints by saying it is a husband's common behaviour. The girl is finally silenced after she is wholly devoured, and the snake escapes from the house my making a hole in the wall.

In a Pwo Karen tale translated as The Witch and the Python, a man has seven lovely, but unmarried daughters. One day, he goes to gather firewood, and finds a tree bearing delicious fruits. The man sights a youth on the tree and asks him to throw him some fruits. The youth is given a basket and fills it for the man. When they are ready to part ways, the man, in gratitude, offers to introduce him as a prospective husband for one of his daughters. The youth agrees to come with him, but only in the form of a snake. He changes into a golden python, hides at the bottom of the fruit basket, and is brought home with the man to be shown to the seven maidens. After he comes home, the man invites each of his daughters to fetch berries from the basket and find the python underneath the fruits. The six eldest daughters refuse their father's choice of husband, but the youngest, named Youngest Daughter, trusts her father's decision and agrees to marry the python. After the ceremony, the snake explains he will sleep by the bo tree instead of on their bed. Some time later, the python suggests Youngest Daughter, his wife, go to the river to bathe in the downstream portion. She takes some herbs with her to wash her hair with. Meanwhile, the python goes upstream and doffs his snakeskin to appear as a human of dazzling countenance. As the discarded snakeskin is washed away in the river, Youngest Daughter, from her position, mistakes it for her husband and tries to save it, hurting her hand in the process. The python husband, now in human form, appears to her, thanking her for her good deed and healing her wound. Later, they pay a visit to his father-in-law, who tells his youngest daughter her elder sisters are filled with envy for her good marriage. The human python then uses a knife to flake off some golden scales from his legs that fill bags of gold, as a gift for his sisters-in-law. Stories of the fortunate and prosperous marriage to the snake reach the ears of a greedy witch, who wishes to have her own daughter experience the same luck, so she goes to the forest to find a snake, places it in a basket along with some berries, and brings it home to her daughter. The witch introduces the snake as her daughter's future husband and they are wedded that same night. When they retire to their quarters, the snake begins to devour the girl little by little: first her feet, then her knees, third her waist. The girl cries that she is being devoured, but the witch dismisses her complaints as a husband's caresses, thinking only of the bags of gold she would gain. The next time the witch goes to check on her daughter, she finds only the python, large now that it devoured her daughter.

In a tale from the Dai people titled Nanmozong ("The Story of the Great Boa"), a widow gives birth to a beautiful girl. One day, mother and daughter walk in the mountains and find a tree bearing delicious mango fruits. The old woman declares that she will marry her daughter to whomever can help them to get the fruits. Suddenly, a great boa appears and shakes the tree to provide them the requested fruits. Mother and daughter fetch the fruits and return home, abandoning the boa near the tree. The reptile trails after them and reaches the old woman's house, where it slithers to her chicken coop. The next morning, the old woman's daughter spots the snake and informs her mother. The duo invite the boa to rest by their fire pot. During the night, when the boa tries to warm some water, it transforms into a Dai youth, who proclaims his love for the old woman's daughter. The girl's elder sister, upon seeing her cadette's luck, decides to look for a snake husband for herself. Thus, she goes up the mountains, takes a real snake back home with her, which devours her during the night.

==== South Asia ====
In a Bhutanese tale titled The Girl who married a snake, a couple, man and wife, live in a village and have a daughter. The wife dies after the girl's birth from an illness, and the man has to look after the girl. One day, the man goes to fetch firewood in the mountain when he finds a big bembochen. The snake threatens to devour the man, who pleads for his life, saying he has a daughter to feed. Interested, the snake spares the man's life and makes a deal: the snake will take care of the man's daughter. The man returns home; the girl does not want to marry a snake, but out of love for her father she agrees to live with the snake. The man takes his daughter to the mountain and delivers her to the snake. By doing this, the snake transforms into a prince, whom the tale explains was cursed by a witch into snake form and who would be disenchanted if a girl promised to marry him. They live happily. Meanwhile, in a distant land, a rich man learns the story of the cursed prince and his wife, and decides to repeat the same success with his own daughter and become even richer. Thus he finds a large snake in the woods, brings it home and locks it with his daughter in her room. The man hears some noises coming from her room, and thinks of the riches his future son-in-law can bring him. The following morning, he open the door to his daughter's room and finds no sign of her, save for her hand sticking out of the snake's mouth. The snake is also dead in a pool of blood, due to indigestion.

== See also ==
- Champavati
- The Origin of the Sirenia
- The Dragon-Prince and the Stepmother
- Princess Himal and Nagaray
- The Snake Prince
- The Ruby Prince (Punjabi folktale)
- The King of the Snakes
- King Iguana
