= King Iguana =

Animal bridegroom tale from Halmahera

"King Iguana" (Galela: Ma Kolano o Kariànga; Dutch: Koning Leguaan) is an Indonesian folktale in the Galela language, collected by H. van Dijken and M. J. van Baarda, and sourced from the island of Halmahera. It deals with the marriage between a human girl and a suitor in animal form that she disenchants to become human. Later, her envious sisters try to murder her and replace her as the animal suitor's wife.

According to Dutch philologist Jan de Vries, the tale belongs to the cycle of the Animal as Bridegroom, in a form that appears in the Indonesian archipelago. Variants also exist in Southeast Asia.

== Translations ==
The tale was also translated into Hungarian language with the title Gyíkkirály ("The Lizard King").

== Summary ==
A couple has an iguana for a son. One day, the lizard passes by a lake where four women are bathing and falls in love with one of them. He tries to woo the maiden by knocking down some flowers from a tjampaka tree, but her sisters shoo him away. The iguana returns home and asks his mother to woo the maiden on his behalf. The woman goes and tries to talk about her son's proposal, but they rebuff her by throwing ashes. Defeated, the woman returns home with no positive answer, so her son decides to try it himself. He goes to his intended's house as an iguana, then enters her room. He takes off the reptile disguise and becomes a youth. At night, his bride pretends to be asleep, takes the iguana skin and burns it. The next morning, the now human iguana warns his bride against having done so, since sorrow and trouble will follow her decision.

At any rate, he exits his bride's room as a man clad in fine garments, to the three sisters' delight and jealousy, who then decide to get rid of their cadette and marry the youth. Later, he goes on a boat trip to get a dowry for her, but gives her an areca nut and a rooster's egg before he leaves, which she hides in her sarong. After he goes away, the three sisters try to invite the maiden to go out with her on some activities (a pretext to kill her): first, to cut firewood for barrels. The elder sisters guide the cadette to the forest, shove her into a pit, then go back home. Her parents ask where their youngest daughter is, and go to the pit to rescue her.

Next, the three sisters invite her to pick up leaves atop a mountain. The maiden decides to join her sisters and climbs up the mountain with them. Up there, there is also a swing that they use for a little play. The elders play in the swing, then the youngest. As she is on the swing, the others cut off the rope and the maiden flies off to the middle of the sea. The areca nut and the rooster's egg then sink a bit into the water, when out of the areca nut a tree sprouts and a rooster hatches out of the egg, which starts to crow. As some ships pass them by, the rooster asks the ships if King Iguana is coming soon; the captains of the first two ships say he is coming after them.

After the third ship passes, the rooster is told King Iguana is on that ship. Thus, the bird takes the maiden on its wings and flies to King Iguana's ship. After it lands, King Iguana admonishes his wife for burning his skin, but hides her in a gond box. King Iguana disembarks and visits his sisters-in-law. He tells them he brought them a present: two chests, just lying on the beach. The three sisters-in-law, hoping to find something precious inside, run to the beach and open up the chests in a hurry. Inside, only needles and knives, which spring out of the chests and kill the envious sisters.

== Analysis ==
=== Tale type ===
Philologist Jan de Vries recognized, in his commentaries, that the tale belonged to the cycle of the Animal as Bridegroom ("Het sprookje van den dierechtgenoot", in the original), but noted a specific narrative that appears in tales from the Indonesian archipelago. In this narrative, the animal bridegroom marries a human maiden or forces her father to surrender her to him; the human maiden (the heroine) discovers her husband becomes a handsome youth and destroys the animal skin, and they live together; the husband, now in human form, gives her a nut or seed and an egg, then departs; the heroine's jealous sisters try to get rid of her by shoving her in the sea, but she survives; a tree sprouts from the seed/nut and a rooster from the egg, or she is rescued by a ship; the heroine's husband returns and punishes the sisters-in-law for their deceit. Similarly, J. A. T. Schwarcz noted, in his collection of Tontemboan tales, the "general outline" is that a human couple gives birth to an animal or vegetable that they get rid of, but the strange son is adopted by an old woman. The son has wonderful powers, and asks the old woman to court a man's daughters on his behalf, by following costumary law: first the eldest daughter, and so on, until the youngest agrees to marry the creature. The creature reveals he is indeed human underneath the animal or vegetable disguise, and lives happily with his human wife. However, the heroine's sisters begin to envy her and try to replace her.

=== Motifs ===
==== The husband's identity ====
According to linguist Nicolaus Adriani, the husband in these stories may appear in the shape of an animal (like an ape, an iguana, a hound, a pig, or a buffalo), even a coconut or a lame-bodied man. However, this is merely a disguise he discards to become a beautiful person.

== Variants ==
=== Indonesia ===
==== Princess Gulungi-luri ====
In a tale from the Loda language titled Ngo Pitiri-Gulungi-luri (Dutch: Prinses Gulungi-luri, English: "Princess Gulungi-luri"), a wellkeeper goes to fetch water by the sea and finds an iguana she brings home in a box. Back home, she prepares dishes for herself; the iguana crawls out of the box, removes its reptile skin and becomes a handsome youth. Nearby in a flying palace, lives the king of the Rising of the Sun (or "of the East") with his seven daughters. The iguana asks the wellkeeper to court one of the princesses for him. She goes to the palace and asks each of the princess which will be the iguana's bride: the six elders refuse, save for the youngest. The wellkeeper reports back to the iguana, who goes to take an evening bath as a human being: his toenails are of a golden colour, his fingernails of silver; and his finger and toes are like gemstones. When he is not bathing, he visits the seventh princess at night. Seven days later, he says he is going on a journey on a ship named IJzer for seven nights. After he leaves, the six elder princesses put a plan in motion: they invite their cadette to cut some bamboos with them, and shove her into a pit. The king learns of this and rescues his youngest daughter. Next, the princesses take her to a swing and push her so hard she flies off into the ocean. Fortunately, the princess has on her sarong an areca nut and an egg the Iguana, her husband, gave her: the areca nut becomes an areca tree and a rooster hatches out of the egg. The princess climbs on top of the tree and stays under the rooster's wings. The rooster crows seven times about how princess Gulungi-luri has drowned, which is seen by the Iguana in the distance. The rooster crows seven times again and flies to Iguana's boat to alert him. The Iguana approaches the tree and rescues his wife, then hides her in a golden basket. He then docks his boat on the seashore and finds his six sisters-in-law waiting for him, thinking their brother-in-law is free to choose one of them. The Iguana, in human form, asks the princesses to lie down on the beach and stay still, while the brings the ship to shore. The Iguana carries his boat over their bodies and crushes his sisters-in-law. Princess Gulungi-luri then disembarks.

==== Molek ====
In an Indonesian tale from Riau Province titled Molek (in the original, Si Molek dan Tanara), a couple have seven daughters of marriageable age, the youngest and seventh, Molek, the most beautiful. Many have come to court and marry them, but the girls reject them. One day, however, a fish named Jerawan appears to propose marriage to one of the girls. Their parents ask them which will choose the fish: the six elders refuse him, but Molek agrees to go with the fish, thus they marry. Although she is mocked for marrying a fish, she loves her husband, but, some time later, decides to discover where her husband does all day, so she follows the fish one day to the forest. The fish goes behind a bush, and out emerges a handsome youth; he goes to the beach, joins a crew on a sailboat and goes to fish in the ocean. Molek discovers her husband's true form and true profession, and decides to keep it a secret, until one day she goes behind the bush and takes the fish skin to hide it. She stays in the bush waiting for Jerawan, and he returns at night, finding his human wife with his fish skin. Molek asks him not to hide himself behind a fish skin anymore, and, although theirs is a happy marriage, she is endlessly mocked by her sisters, so she would like to show them his true form. The man agrees to live as human for now on, and says his name is Tanara. Some time later, after Tanara remains human, Molek's elder sisters nurture jealousy towards their cadette, since they wished to marry him. One day, Tanara goes on a long journey, and Molek's elder sisters plot the perfect moment to get rid of her. Years later, when Tanara is ready to come back, Molek's sisters pay her a visit and suggest they sail on small boats to wait for Tanara out in the open sea. After playing and splashing in the water, the girls abandon Molek on a small boat and make their way to the shore. Molek, adrift at sea, tries to paddle her small boat somewhere, but she faints, exhausted from her efforts. Meanwhile, Tanara's ships, filled with gold, silver and jewels, are nearing the shore, when they sight a small boat with a woman inside. They rescue the castaway and bring her up to Tanara's quarters. Tanara recognizes the castaway as his wife, Molek, and she reveals her sisters' ploy against her. After listening to her tale, he plans to teach a lesson to his sisters-in-law: he asks some men to hide Molek in a box, to keep her survival a secret, then comes to port. He is greeted by people, and goes up to his sisters-in-law's house, where they are expecting him with their best dresses and the best food, hoping to draw his attentions. Tanara takes a seat and tells his adventures to them, and, lastly, about a woman he found adrift at sea, then bids his wife enter and sit beside him. The girls look at the woman and realize she is their sister Molek, safe after all. The girls feel ashamed for their deed, and Tanara swears he will not pursue any revenge against them.

==== King Baung ====
In a South Kalimantan tale sourced from the Banjar people with the title Raja Baung ("King Baung"), a poor old widow has a baung (a kind of freshwater fish) for a son. One day, the baung fish asks his mother to court one of the local king's daughters on his behalf. The widow goes to the king's court to fulfill her son's request. The elder princesses refuse to marry the fish, save for the youngest, Putri Bungsu. Still, the king does not agree to their marriage at first, and sets tasks for the baung to fulfill before their marriage is celebrated. The baung does as ordered and marries Putri Bungsu. Eventually, the princess discovers the baung is, actually, a man under the fish scale disguise, and, one day, after he took off his fish disguise, the princess burns the scales to keep him human permanently. Some time later, the elder princesses learn of their brother-in-law's true appearance, and decide to get rid of Putri Bungsu to have the now human baung for themselves. The now human baung decides to go on a journey to earn a living, and leaves his wife, pregnant at the time, unprotected. After he departs, the elder princesses decide to invite their cadette for some playing in a swing. However, the elder sisters shove her so hard she flies off the swing and into the sea. Putri Bungsu survives and finds a hollowed out trunk to hold on to. She gives birth to a son and waits there adrift until her husband appears on a ship to rescue them. He hides his wife and son in a chest, then sails back home. He docks his ship, then asks his sisters-in-law what happened to Putri Bungsu. The princesses lie that she was devoured by some animal, and the human baung opens up the chest, revealing a still alive Putri Bungsu and her child. The king then punishes his daughters.

==== The cat who turned into a man ====
Researcher Edwin M. Loeb collected and published a tale from the Mentawei Islands with the Mentewai title Mao ibailiu sirimanua, translated as The cat who turned into a man, which he considered to be a "Malay importation" into the island. In this tale, a Mentawei youth marries a wife, but he dies when she is pregnant. Some months later, she gives birth to a cat. He grows up and asks his widowed mother (teteu) to fetch a simaingo flower and find him a bride. The woman finds the flower and goes to a village where three sisters live together in a rusuk (a house without altar). The woman offers the flower to the elder sister, who refuses the cat's marriage promise. The woman returns to tell her cat son about the eldest's refusal, and the animal sends her again: the second time she asks the middle sister, who refuses; lastly, she asks the youngest sister, who accepts the cat's proposal. They marry, move out to another house and make punen. The cat changes into a handsome youth and joins his wife in the punen fields. When they return home on a boat to their village, his sisters-in-law sight him from a distance and deduce the man is the cat, but in another form. Some time later, Cat (the husband's name) is set to go fishing in the sea, and warns his wife not to accept her sisters' invitation to go swinging. The man goes fishing in the sea, and his wife, back home, forgets his warnings and joins her sisters for some swinging. However, as the girl is playing in the swing, the rope cuts off and she is flung away into the sea. When she emerges, she swims to a deserted island (padarai). There, she wishes for her house to appear next to her, and it happens so. She then wishes for her furniture and food to come to her, which also happens. Back to Cat, the husband, he sights some smoke on the deserted island and sails there. He finds his wife, who explains she went swinging with her sisters, and ended up there. Cat places a rain hat (turok) on his wife to hide her face, and both sail back home. After they dock, the sisters-in-law approach them to unload the goods into their home. After they finish the task, Cat and his wife whip the duo and expel them from their home.

==== Ringkitan and the Cuscus ====
In a tale from Sulawesi with the title Si Ringkitan dan Kusoi, translated as Ringkitan and the Cuscus or Ringkitan and Kusoi, a fisherman lives in Minahasa with his nine daughters, Ringkitan the youngest and the most beautiful. The girls' parents want to see them married to suitable husbands, but no person seems good enough. One day, however, an animal called cuscus appears to court the girls: the eight elders refuse to marry it, save for Ringkitan. The girl and the cuscus marry, despite the endless mocking by her sisters and their village. Ringkitan's marriage is still a happy one, although she does not know what her husband does for a living, since he leaves in the morning and returns at night. One morning, she decides to trail behind him and follows him to the forest. The cuscus hides behind some bushes, takes off his animal skin and hides it under some bushes, becomes a human male and joins with other men on a fishing boat. Ringkitan is happy to learn her husband's secret, and, after assuring he is indeed a human underneath the cuscus skin, decides to release him from his disguise. Some days later, while he goes to the fishing trip, Ringkitan hides the cuscus skin and waits for her husband's return to fetch his skin. He notices that Ringkitan is in the bushes with his skin, and she reveals she wants to have him human at all times, which he agrees to. He also tells her his real name: Kusoi. Ringkitan is even happier than before, but her elder sisters, after learning their brother-in-law is human after all, decide to get rid of Ringkitan. Later, Kusoi departs on a long business trip, and Ringkitan's sisters wait for the perfect moment to put their plan into action. After news of Kusoi's return reach their ears, the elder sisters invite their cadette to come play with them and swing in some tree branches near the seashore. The sisters, with evil intent, push her so hard she swings over the tree branches and her hair entangles between the branches. Ringkitan pleads for her sisters to help her, but they abandon her to her fate. The girl then notices a line of ships (a wooden boat, a more ornate wooden boat, a copper boat, a silver boat, and finally a golden boat) sailing nearby and sings some verses to draw their attention. Each of them replies that Kusoi is coming, and the man himself appears on the golden boat. He stops by the tree and rescues her down from it, and asks her how she ended up there. Ringkitan is glad to see her husband again and explains her elder sisters tried to kill her. Kusoi then plans to teach his sisters-in-law a lesson: he hides Ringkitan in a trunk and arrives home, where he asks where his wife is. The sisters pretend they saw her at the seashore. Kusoi then invites people to tell about his adventures on the open sea, and tells them he rescued a woman atop a tree near the seashore. The sisters start to fidget, fearing for their brother-in-law's story, until he bids some servants bring Ringkitan in, dresses in fine garments. He introduces the newcomer as his wife Ringkitan, and says he will not punish her pursuers. At the end of the tale, Ringkitan forgives her elder sisters for their misdeeds. The tale was originally published by missionary N. P. Wilken with the Dutch title De negen zusters ("The jealous sisters"), in 1886.

==== The tale about the Monkey ====
Author J. A. T. Schwarz collected from a Tomtenboan source named Thomas Dien a tale titled Kakua an doro' i Wolai, translated into Dutch as Verhaal van den Aap (English: "The tale of the Monkey"). Folklorist Paul Hambruch translated it into German as Die Geschichte vom Affen ("The Tale about the Monkey"). In this tale, an old woman has a monkey for a son. One day, the monkey asks his mother to give him a sleeping mat so he can sunbathe. Despite warning him about standing so close to people, she attends his request. He spends his days on the mat on his porch, when he sights the eldest princess passing by to bathe, then an idea forms in his head: he will marry the princess. The monkey asks his mother to woo the eldest princess for him, but she questions how a girl can marry an animal. After some insistence, the woman goes to the palace and tells the king about her son's proposal. The king calls his eldest daughter to ask her about a possible marriage to a monkey. The girl refuses, and so do the other princesses, save the youngest, who accepts the proposal. The woman reports back to her son, and the monkey asks to be taken to the princess's palace so they can bathe together. It happens so: as soon as the monkey meets his fiancée, he takes off the monkey skin, becomes a handsome prince, then utters an incantation to summon fine garments for themselves, so they can present themselves before the king. The royal couple is impressed by their appearance, and the king asks his future son-in-law where the wedding will take place. The monkey replies it will happen soon, after he provides a house for themselves. He summons a large house with a spell and marries the princess. Some time later, the monkey, now in human form, is set to go on a journey, and warns his wife not to go swinging with her elder sisters, then gives her a betel nut and a rooster's egg, for her to place one on the other, so that a rooster will hatch and alert the prince with its crowing. After he departs, the princess's elder sisters conspire to kill her, and invite her to play on a swing by the beach. As the princess is swinging, her elder sisters push her so hard she falls into the ocean. Realizing she is in danger, she cracks open the egg and places the rooster on the betel nut. The rooster begins to crow and alerts the prince, who hears the noise and makes a turn to rescue his wife. He finds her with the rooster and the betel nut, hides her in a basket, then sails back home. After arriving, he sees that his eldest sister-in-law is there instead of his wife, and asks his father-in-law if his wife is really in the house. The king answers that the monkey's wife is indeed there (despite it being a lie), and the youngest princess rises out of the basket. The monkey prince then assumes the throne and makes his family-in-law his slaves.

==== Shrimp Husband ====
In an Indonesian tale from Western Sulawesi titled Ilaurang or I Laurang (Manusia Udang) ("Shrimp Husband"), an old couple desperately wish to have a child, even if he is a shrimp. Thus, they pray to God for one son, and God ("Tuhan") gives them one: the woman bears a child in the shape of a shrimp, whom they call I Laurang (from urang 'shrimp'). When the boy grows up, he asks his parents to court the local king's daughter on his behalf. His mother questions whoever would want to marry a shrimp, but still goes to the palace to present I Laurang's proposal. The king sends for his seven daughters and explains them the situation about the prospective shrimp bridegroom. The six elder daughters refuse to marry the shrimp son, save for the youngest princess, Lissiq Beruq-Beruq (or Putri Bongsu, in another version), out of filial obedience. I Laurang's mother returns home to tell her son about his bride, and he comes out of the shrimpskin. He shaves himself and presents himself at his wedding, where people admire his beauty as a handsome human youth. The seventh princess marries the shrimp youth in a grand wedding, now in human form. The six elder princesses learn that their brother-in-law is actually a handsome youth and begin to feel jealous towards their cadette. Later, I Laurang asks his wife for permission to sail abroad to trade in foreign lands, gives her a chicken's egg and a betel nut as a precaution, since he is aware of his sisters-in-law's deadly intentions, and advises her to always carry both objects with her whenever she is with her sisters. After he leaves, the princesses invite their sister to play on a swing by the seashore. The other princesses shove the swing so hard, the Putri Bongsu is thrown in the sea, while the sisters celebrate their victory. The princess, adrift in the sea, remembers her husband's advice and places the betel nut on the seabed, then enters the egg. Days pass, and the betel nut becomes a betel tree that sprouts in the middle of the sea, while a rooster perches atop it. As I Laurang's white boat is sailing past the betel tree, the rooster flies off to his boat. The rooster keeps crowing, and I Laurang says a prayer, turning the bird into his wife. Restored to human form, the princess tells her husband about her sisters' treachery, and I Laurang plots with her a way to unmask his sisters-in-law: he hides her in a chest and gives her a needle to prickle the shoulders of the bearers. I Laurang's boat docks on the shore, he disembarks and goes to meet his sisters-in-law, bidding them to carry the large chest from the boat, for whoever can carry it back home shall marry him. The princesses quickly move to carry it, one by one, but they cannot bear it, since they feel something prickling their backs. I Laurang carries the chest home and says they need to see what is inside it. Suddenly, Putri Bungsu comes out of the chest, safe and sound, and the princesses make a run for it: some enter the kitchen, another hides in a well, and others tumble to the floor. The tale explains that the places the princesses hid into are now the chores they have to perform as I Laurang and his wife's servants: some cooking, some grinding the rice, and others drawing water from the well.

==== The Tale of the Torso ====
In another Totemboan tale collected by Schwarz titled Kukua an doro' i Pokol (Dutch: Verhaal van het Stompje; English: "The Tale of the Torso"), a couple have a son that is only a legless, armless torso. People, rich and poor, come to see the torso child, and give him gifts. One day, the son tells his mother he wants to go sailing. Despite her concerns, her son insists on his wish and the woman takes him to the shore to the ships, in a basket filled with pumpkin and cucumber seeds, a cleaver, an axe and a machete. The sailors are a bit afraid at his presence, for they have never seen someone as him, but agree to take him as part of the crew. After they sail the sea, the torso asks to be left on a certain island, and departs. After his request is fulfilled, the torso takes off his disguise and becomes an able-bodied European man, his true form. In this new shape, the youth cultivates the land, plants the pumpkins and cucumbers, and builds a house. At one time, he meets a talking mouse and takes three whiskers from its body, then returns home to his mother still in his torso form, but brings gold to her. Later, he summons the mouse with the whiskers, and asks it and its mice to build him a better house, made of gold. The next day, the torse asks his mother to go woo one of the daughters of the local king on his behalf, starting with the eldest. The woman goes to the king's house and makes her case. The king agrees, but the princesses are to be asked in order of birth, the eldest first. The torso brings with him a pinang box and whoever chooses him shall be given it. The eight elder princesses decline the torso's marriage proposal, save for the youngest. The torso prepares his wedding to the princess, and summons food and drinks for the guests with a magic while no one is looking, then takes off the torsoe disguise to appear as a human. The eight elder princesses see his true form, and cry in their rooms, since they rejected him at first. Three days after their marriage, the now human torso leaves his wife with his mother and departs on a sea voyage. Meanwhile, the eight princesses conspire to kill their cadette: they invite her to go swinging near the beach, and, when the girl is on the swing, they push her so hard she is flung off into the ocean, where the princesses hope she drowns. However, the youngest princess saves herself by swimming to a deserted island. She then climbs up a tree and shouts for her husband Koesoi to hear it that her eldest sister Rintjitan shoved her in the ocean. She sights a ship and repeats her words. On the ship is her husband, Pokol, who hears her pleas and docks on the island. They renuite, and the princess explains the situation to him. Pokol them places her inside a basket with breathing holes, then sails back home. He goes to his mother's home and asks where his wife is; his mother only says that her sisters invited her to go with them and she has not been seen since. He then asks his father-in-law where the princess is, but the king does not know either. Lastly, Pokol invites his sisters-in-law for a meal, when the elder princesses insist they did not see their cadette, so Pokol utters a spell to glue their mouths to their plates, as punishment for their lie, and leaves them in that state. He sails again for three days, then returns home. The king, his father-in-law, offers to make him king, and begs for Pokol to release the eight princesses from the spell. Pokol agrees and is made king after his father-in-law, and reigns with his wife.

==== The girl who married the Moon ====
Ethnographer and missionary Albert Christian Kruyt collected a Torajan tale he translated as Het meisje dat met de maan trouwt ("The girl who married the moon"). In this tale, a woman gives birth to a girl, and dies in childbirth. She grows up and lives on Earth, until one day she decides to have the Moon as her husband. She climbs a rainbow and ascends to the Heavens. She meets the Moon and asks him to be her husband. The Moon agrees and goes down to Earth to live with her, and they have a son: a coconut. Unaware of what to do with such a fruit, the couple try to sell it to a group of seven sisters that lived on a mountain. The elder six sister refuse to buy the fruit, save for the youngest, who purchases it and places it on a table. After she goes for bathing and returns, she notices there are signs in her house that someone has been there. The same thing happens the next day, so she decides to investigate: she lies in hiding and sees a handsome youth in the house, and notices that the coconut has vanished. She goes out of hiding and asks the man about the fruit, and the man says he is the coconut. She cooks food for him, and they eat together. The man then states the girl is his wife, and that his name is "Mangkaloekoe" (meaning 'coconut'). Later, the girl's elder sisters pay them a visit and, on seeing the handsome brother-in-law, decide to kill their cadette. After a while, Mangkaloekoe is ready to go on a trip, and warns his wife not to leave their house, since her sisters will try to kill her. After he leaves, and despite the warnings, the girl goes to play with her sisters by the water, and the others try to drown her in a deeper part of the river, then go back home. The girl stays underwater for seven months, until Mangkaloekoe's ships with slaves are sailing nearby. The girl asks the ships, in the form of verses, if her husband is nearby, and the slaves answer that he is coming behind them. After seven ships pass her by, she sings again, and her husband, listening to the verses, recognizes his wife's voice, and rescues her from the water. They dock the ship, return home, found a village and have many descendants.

==== The Story of the Coconut Shell ====
In a tale in the Tobelo language with the title Ngàdje-ngàdje mòi ài ròmănga o kabėlànga (Dutch: Een vertelling (van iemand) geheeten "Klapperdop"; English: "The Story (about one) called Coconut Shell"), a woman drinks water from a hollow coconut shell and gives birth to a coconut shell. Years later, the coconut son asks his mother to woo one of the daughters of the King of the East as his bride. The woman does as asked and meets the eldest princess. One by one, they reject him as a potential suitor, and the woman reports back each time. Finally, the youngest princess agrees to marry him, and sends him a token of affection, then moves out to the old woman's house. For this the youngest princess is mocked by her elder sisters. Some time later, the princess and the coconut shell go to the fields, him as a human being, his upper half like the Sun (of a gold colour) and the lower half like the moon (of a silver colour), then return home. The elder princesses pay her cadette a visit and invite her for a bath. When the group goes near the water, they shove the youngest princess in the water and a crocodile swallows her. Coconut Shell, still human, asks his sisters-in-law if they saw his wife, and they answer she was devoured by the crocodile. Coconut Shell dives to rescue his wife from the crocodile's maw, asking the reptile to return her to him, and takes her home. Next, the elder sisters invite her to pick palm fronds, and shove her into a serpent's lair. Again, Coconut Shell goes to talk with the serpent to release his wife. Lastly, he tells her he will sail around for a year and gives her a pinang (Areca nut) and a hen's egg, to be kept in her sarong. After he departs, the elder sisters invite the princess to play on a swing near the beach. As she plays in the swing, the princess is pushed with such force she flies off the swing and falls into the sea. The elder sisters return home, believing their plan worked. Back to the princess, the pinang sprouts into a tree and a rooster comes out of the egg and begins to crow. After a year, Coconut Shell is coming back with a fleet of seven ships, himself on the seventh. The rooster flies off to the top of the village and begins to crow after the seventh ship passes him by to alert Coconut Shell. He hears the crowing and asks where it is coming from; the rooster crows again and points to the princess, stranded on the tree. Coconut Shell rescues his wife and hides her in a box, then makes his way home. After he reaches home, his sisters-in-law approach him quite solicitous, asking is they can prepare plum for him and rub coconut oil on his body. Coconut Shell asks them to gather around, takes out a needle, and blinds them in their eyes. At the end of the tale, he takes out his true wife, the princess, from the box, and they live together.

==== The Gourd ====
In an Indonesian tale from Menado, North Sulawesi, translated as Kürbis ("The Gourd"), a poor couple have a son they call "Kapitu", since he looks like a gourd. The parents look after the boy, who also helps them in daily chores. Years later, Kapitu grows up and becomes a skilled and peerless flute player. One day, Kapitu tells his mother he wants to marry, but his mother is worried about it. Kapitu insists so much she relents and promises to fulfill his request: to marry one of the seven daughters of the local ruler. The woman is astonished at this information, and Kapitu threatens to kill himself by jumping into a river full of crocodiles. With heavy concern, she goes to the king to court one of the princesses for her son. The king hears the woman's plea, and summons the queen, who sends for her seven daughters: the six elders (Roun, Ili, Purut, Imes, Tombene and Kaes) all refuse to marry Kapitu - which his mother expected would happen. However, the seventh princess, Ingkan, accepts Kapitu's proposal even before the woman has a chance to finish the question. Kapitu's mother is touched by the princess's good heart, but worries about affording their marriage ceremony. Meanwhile, Kapitu himself simply plays on his flute as a sign of his great happiness. The next day, the king goes for a walk around the village (kampong) and finds a finely sturdied house near a pond, of mysterious provenance. Seven days later, their wedding happens: the guests are astonished by the food, and Kapitu himself, instead of a lame-looking person, appears as a divine-looking hero to meet his bride, to everyone's surprise. The man guides the guests to his marital home, the same one located near the edge of the kampong, and they marvel at its beauty. The elder princesses, however, notice the happiness and beauty of the marrying couple, curse their previous decisions, and begin to plot a way to ruin Ingkan's fortune. One day, when Kapitu is not home, the princesses invite Ingkan for some playing on a swing. The girl agrees and joins them by the swing near the lake shore. Each of the princesses play on the swing, but, when it is Ingkan's turn, they shove her so hard she flies off the swing to the other side of the lake. Kapitu goes home and, not finding Ingkan, takes a boat and decides to look for her. As his boat sails near an island, he sights his wife sitting on a stone and goes to meet her. They embrace. Despite his sisters-in-law's betrayal, Kapitu's love wins over his hatred, and he goes back home with Ingkan. At the end of the tale, he becomes leader of the village. The tale was also translated to Russian with the title "Капиту" ("Kapitu"), and sourced from the Minahasan.

==== Three Daughters of a Monarch ====
In a Rotinese tale translated into Dutch with the title Er wordt verhaald van drie dochters van den vorst ("It is said about three daughters of a monarch"), a crow (kraai, in the Dutch translation) sends his servants to propose to three princesses: the elder two refuse. The story then explains that the elder princesses take a bath downstream in a river, after the crow flaps its wings to clean the dirty on it, which they complain about. The crow returns the other day, this time as a man clad in gold, and places a stick on the ground and hangs his bag on it. The man then asks for each of the princesses to fetch the bag: the elder two fail, but the youngest accomplishes the task, and marries the now human crow. Later, the elder princesses invite their cadette to join them in some activities: first, to gather firewood in the forest; next, to come fetch water. On each occasion, the princesses kill their youngest sister, then return home and find her safe and sound. After these two events, the human crow tells his wife he is going to Koepang, but gives her a hen egg to be held in her clothes, and to have it with her the next time her sisters invite her to go fish in the sea. After he departs, the princess's elder sisters take her to fish in the sea, then shove her in the water. In the sea, the girl grabs a rock and notices the egg she had with her hatched a rooster that begins to crow to alert its master. The human crow hears the crowing and goes to fetch his wife in the sea. He places needles in her hands and hides her inside a box, then sails back home. When he docks, he finds his sisters-in-law there and they lie that their sister is dead. In response, the human crow tells them he brought a box with purchases from Koepang, and the greedy sisters-in-law go to open it. As soon as they lift the lid, the girl springs out of the box then sticks the needles in her sisters' eyes to blind them. The elder sisters then die. The now human crow goes to live with his wife.

==== A Titibholo ====
In a tale from a Muna source from Mabodu (Katobu) with the title A Titibholo, translated as Titibholo, orphaned Titibholo lives with his grandmother. He earns his living by sailing to Java and returns home after earning lots of money. One day, he asks his grandmother to find a wife for him, and he sets his sights on one of the seven daughters of the village chief, preferably the eldest. The grandmother goes to the village chief's house with a bag of money to propose on his grandson's behalf: the elder daughter refuses; the king asks every other daughter, who also refuse, save for the youngest, named Wa Ndaipitu. Wa Ndaipitu accepts Titibholo's proposal and the youth's grandmother goes back to inform him. Since his future bride is not grown up yet, he says he will go away to earn money, then return to her. Titibholo goes on a journey for six months, then returns with gifts for his intended: jewels and garments, to her elder sisters' jealousy. He sails away again and again brings gifts for her, garments, pitchers and plates, earning her even more jealousy from her sisters. After three journeys, Titibholo marries Wa Ndaipitu and they move out to his mother's house, where they live until their own home is built. Time passes, and Titibholo has to go on another journey. Before he departs, he warns his wife not to leave their home and to refuse her sisters' invitation to go swinging by the dhangki mango tree. After he leaves, her six sisters come to invite her to go swinging, but she refuses it at first. At another time, one sister appears alone and manages to invite her. Wa Ndaipitu accepts their invitation and accompanies them to the swing by the dhangki mango. Her sisters push the swing so hard and, after the third time, Wa Ndaipitu flies over to a tree on a cliff. She climbs the trees until she reaches a mountain, and lives there for some time. After some 40 days, Wa Ndaipitu sights some ships passing by the sea, and asks each of them if her husband Titibholo is with them. From the ship, they answer that Titibholo is coming just behind them. Wa Ndaipitu waves to her husband's ship, he recognizes his wife and rescues her from the mountain, hides her in a box, then makes his way home. He docks his ship, unloads his goods, and enters his house, where his sisters-in-law are waiting for him. Suddenly, a cock crows, alerting Titibholo about Wa Ndaipitu's sisters throwing her in the Sampuru sea. The elder sisters try to deceive Titibholo, but the cock crows twice more about their deed. He leaves to look for a place to drink palm wine, then returns home later at night. He then opens the box so Wa Ndaipitu can leave and they cook and eat something. Her sisters discover their cadette is alive, and everyone flees through the windows.

==== Other tales ====
In an untitled tale collected in the Ternate language, an old woman lives with a goat. One day, the goat asks his human mother to go and court one of the local king's daughters on his behalf. The king agrees to a prospective marriage, but asks the goat on some tasks: first, he is to build a golden house, then, to build a golden bridge. After fulfilling the king's tasks, the king summons his ministers and councilman to ask his daughter which will accept the goat's proposal: the elders decline it, save for the youngest, who assures the goat is no animal. The king then asks for a dowry of thirty thousand coins. The goat opens its mouth and produces the requested dowry. The youngest princess marries the goat and ties him to their house. Some time later, his sisters-in-law invite him for a feast with some ball playing activity. The goat simply bleats as his answer. However, a prince on a golden horse appears at the feast and expertly plays a ball game with the guests. Back home, the princess gives her husband a plate with jackfruit. The next day, the same mysterious prince appears at the festivities again, makes merry with the guests, then vanishes. One day, however, the princess goes to bring food for her husband, and finds only a goatskin hanging on the wall. She takes it and throws it in the fire. When her husband returns home, for the prince is the goat, he says his belongings have been destroyed, and he is now poor and will not leave the house for anything. After seven days, the princess hears a gong and goes to divine how her husband was a person in goat form. Later, the now human goat says he wants to travel for a while, and gives his wife a pinang and an egg, telling her to have them in her sarong at all times. After he departs, the elder princesses commission a swing to be made near the water and invite their cadette to come swinging with them. As she is swinging, her sisters cut off the rope and the princess falls into the ocean. Suddenly, the pinang sprouts into a pinang tree and a rooster hatches out of the egg. Atop the tree, the rooster crows to the some passing ships about the "prince of goats" (the princess's husband). The first sailors say he is coming after them by water, the second batch that he is already on land, and the third and last that he is there. The goat prince then plucks some ma noere flowers, wraps them in a white clothe, places the arrangement on a basin, then inside a box. He them docks his ship and is asked by the people to disembark, but he refuses since his wife has now been given to another man. The tale ends.

=== Southeast Asia ===
==== Jarai language ====
French linguist Jacques Dournes collected a Jarai language tale titled akhan jaˀ pum (French: Conte de Mère Brousse; English: "Tale of Mother Bush"): Mother Bush scavenges the forest for yams; a python on a tree branch utters a spell for rain so Mother Bush can take a shelter with him. It happens thus. Mother Bush returns home and asks her granddaughters which will go with the python: the elder, H'Bia, refuses, but the younger, H'Luiˀ, agrees, and marries the python. The couple go for a bath in the river, and the python takes off the snakeskin to become a youth. After a swimming accident with H'Luiˀ, the python, in human form, resurrects her and brings her back home. H'Luiˀ's eldest sisters, H'Kruah and H'Bia, see their brother-in-law's beauty and H'Bia asks him for a similar python to be brought as her spouse. Her wish is granted, but the second python is a real animal that swallows her, then escapes. The human python goes after the animal and finds it. He fools the animal by saying he will look for lice, cuts off its belly and releases his sister-in-law. (Note: This sequence (heroine's sister tries to imitate heroine's successful marriage to snake, with disastrous results) is classified as its own tale type in the Aarne-Thompson Index: AaTh 433C, "The Serpent Husband and The Jealous Girl". However, in his own revision of the folk type index, published in 2004, German folklorist Hans-Jörg Uther subsumed type 433C under a new type: ATU 433B, "King Lindworm".) Later, the human python tells his wife he will travel along the country of the Yuan people, and warns her not to leave the house for any reason. After he leaves, H'Bia invites her cadette to go swinging near the river. The girl agrees to go, despite her husband's warnings, and is shoved into the water, where a crocodile swallows her. Inside the crocodile's belly, she gives birth to a son. The crocodile reaches a beach, H'Luiˀ's son cuts open the crocodile and he and his mother make landfall. The son then summons a house for them and a rooster, whose crowing summons an orange tree and alerts the boy's father. The human python sails to the beach and recognizes his wife.

Jacques Dournes collected another Jarai language tale titled akhan jaˀ dɔn-duŋ haŋ hluiˀ tom rit (French: Conte de Mère-grand et H’Luiˀ avec Rit; English: "Tale of Grandmother and H’Luiˀ with Rit") which he translated into French and published with the title L’Aînée ("The Elder Sister"). In this tale, an old woman lives with her younger granddaughter Louite. One day, she leaves home to find food for them, since the land is ravaged by a great drought. She utters an invocation to summon rain and it pours down from the skies. She ventures into the deep forest until she reaches a lush garden full of sugarcane and banana trees, and says she would give Louite in marriage to the person that owns the garden. A python-lové interrupts her thoughts and says he owns the garden. The woman relents and repeats her words to the python, which agrees to a marriage with the girl. The python worries about being a reptile, but says he will accompany the woman to her village and wait by the forest. The woman goes back home with sugarcanes and bananas, and tells her granddaughter about the marriage promise to the serpent. Louite agrees to marry the python, and goes to meet him at the edge of the village. Louite and python-lové move out to a distant house with the previous garden and herds of chickens, swine, horses and buffalos. They spend time together, until Python-lové says he will visit his mother. He leaves his wife in their garden for 10 days, then takes off the snakeskin and returns as a human on a horse. Meanwhile, Louite has not eaten nor drunk anything while her husband is absent, and sees the newcomer. The youth introduces himself as python-lové, but Louite does not believe it at first, until he enumerates their herds of cattle, and shows her the discarded snakeskin. Three months later, Python-lové says he will go on a voyage to the country of the Cham, and asks his wife to stay home until his return. After he departs, L'Aînée ("Elder Sister") decides to visit Louite to kill her, so she could be Python-lové's wife. Elder Sister tries to convince a pregnant Louite to come see the pigs, the buffalos - which she declines -, and to play on a swing - which she accepts. Louite goes with Elder Sister to play on the swing just overlooking a deep river, and fetches a chicken egg on the way. Elder Sister plays on the swing, then Louite does, and the former cuts off the rope, which throws Louite into the river. Elder Sister utters a curse to summon a crocodile that devours Louite, then makes her way to Python-lové's home. Back to Louite, the egg hatches a rooster named Clarté ("Clarity"). The rooster beaks the crocodile's belly, and eventually the bird and the girl escape the reptile's stomach and make landfall on a Cham beach. The Cham people find them and build them a house, so they can listen to the rooster's crow. Back to Python-lové, he feels his ring press into his finger and suspects something happened to Louite. He arrives home and finds his sister-in-law, Elder Sister, then goes to his mother-in-law's house, but none have seen Louite. Python-lové wanders off until he reaches the beach where Louite is living with the rooster, and meets her. They relate each other their stories, recognizing each other, then go back home to kill Elder Sister.

==== Myanmar ====
In a Burmese tale titled The Snake Prince, a widow lives in a cottage by the river with her three daughters, and earns her living by gathering firewood. She also tries to fetch fruits in the woods whenever she can. One day, she tries to find some fallen figs from a fig tree and, not finding any, insults the tree. Suddenly, a snake appears to her, with figs in its coils. The widow sees the figs and offers one of her daughters in marriage to the snake (whom she calls Lord Nāga): Ma U (the eldest), Ma Lat (the middle one) and Ma Htwe (the youngest). The snake releases the figs after it hears the proposition, and the widow seizes the opportunity to fetch the figs in a basket. On the road home, the woman passes by a tree stump, a hillock and a boulder, to which she gives a fig if they lies to the snake that she passes by them. The snake, a Naga, follows the widow to her cottage, and passes by the tree stump, the hillock and the boulder, and creeps into a rice pot. The widow opens up the lid and the snake coils itself around her arm, chastising her for trying to trick it. The widow repeats her offer for the snake to release her arm, and goes to talk to her daughters: the elder two refuse to marry the snake, but Ma Htwe agrees to be with the reptile, gives some milk and rice to ti and takes it in a basket to her room. The next morning, Ma Htwe has a dream that a man came in and embraced her. Her mother says she will check into the matter and, that same night, sees a human youth coming out of the snake's basket and embracing her youngest daughter. She takes the snakeskin and throws it in the fire. The human snake begins to writhe in pain; Ma Htwe wakes up and goes to the kitchen to fetch some cool water and pours it on the youth's skin. After curing his burning, the youth explains he is a Naga Prince, and, without his snakeskin, shall live as a mortal beside her. Ma Htwe and the Naga Prince move out to a cottage and have a son they name Kin Shwe (Prince Golden). The Naga Prince decides to find work with a merchant, and sails away, leaving his family alone to deal with the elder sisters' envy, who plot to get rid of Ma Htwe. They approach her and try to draw her out of her house, but she stays home. One day, they convince her to accompany them for a picnic near a mango tree, for old times' sake, so they could play at a swing. Ma Htwe climbs onto the swing and is shoved by her sisters into the sea, but she and her child are rescued by a large stork. Meanwhile, the Naga Prince is coming back from his journey, and listens to his wife's voice, finding her in the stork's nest. He makes a deal with the large bird and rescues his wife. The Naga Prince wants to punish his sisters-in-law with death, but Ma Htwe decides they must be publicly shamed, so he places his wife in an empty chest. When he disembarks, he asks his sisters-in-law to carry the heavy chest to the village. They open the chest, and out comes Ma Htwe and her son. The tale was originally published by Burmese scholar Maung Htin Aung, and this sequence represents the "happy ending" of the story. Likewise, Maung Htin Aung stated that the stork helper is the "large Burmese stork", that is, the adjutant bird, and suggested that the tale's "happy ending" was a separate tale at first. In addition, according to researchers Gerry Abbott and Khin Thant Han, the tale is "widely known" in Burma, with either ending (the tragic one or the happy one).

In a Burmese tale titled The Snake-Prince and the Three Sisters, a widow lives with her three daughters in a village by the sea: the elder two named Ma Pu and Ma Tin, and the youngest called Aye Aye ('the gentle one'), the most beautiful and kind of the three. Whenever she goes to the market, she passes by a mango tree and fetches fruits from the ground. However, one time, she cannot find mangoes on the ground and sighs. Suddenly, she hears a hiss on the tree: a snake is there. The widow offers to marry one of her daughters to the reptile: the snake drops a single mango each time in response to the woman's mention of her elder daughters, but releases several more mangoes when it hears the youngest's name. The widow takes the mangoes in her basket and returns home, but passes by a monkey, a river and a little child, whom she bribes with a mango to lie to the snake if it passes by that same road. As the woman goes home, the snake follows her and passes by the monkey, the river and the child, whom he threatens to devour if they do not guide him to the widow's house. After he reaches her house, he enters through an open window and slithers to the widow's bed. The woman hears a noise and wakes up, only to find the same snake coiling around her legs. The widow then asks her three daughters which one will fulfill her mother's proposal: Ma Pu and Ma Tin refuse, while Aye Aye agrees. The snake releases its grasp on the woman, and joins his bride. Aye Aye marries the snake the next day, feeds him with milk and rice and makes him a basket to sleep in. A week later, the widow asks Aye Aye about her marital life, and the girl says she has dreams about a young prince that comes to her bed and tells stories to her. The widow investigates into the matter and, that same night, spies on a prince coming out of the basket. The widow takes the snakeskin from the basket and burns it, keeping her son-in-law human forever. As her elder daughters realize their cadette married a prince, they begin to nurture jealousy against her. One day, the snake-prince (as Aye Aye's husband starts to be called) says he has to go on a long voyage, and warns Aye Aye not to trust her sisters. After he departs, Ma Pu and Ma Tin try to trick Aye Aye: first, they invite her to stay with them; next, they invite her to go to the market to buy some essentials; lastly, to play a bit near the beach on a boat. Aye Aye falls for their tricks and takes her son to play with them. Ma Pu and Ma Tin abandon Aye Aye and her son on a boat adrift on the sea, but a large crane sent by the gods guides the boat with its beak to a desert island, where mother and son feed on roots and fishes brought by the crane. Some time later, Aye Aye sees a coming ship she recognizes as her husband's, and pleads for the crane to guide the snake prince to the island. It happens thus, and the snake prince rescues his wife and son, and, after learning of his sisters-in-law's ploy, decides to punish them. The snake-prince goes back home and is greeted by Ma Pu and Ma Tin, who lie that Aye Aye went missing in the sea. In response, the snake-prince says he brought his blood sister with him, and takes a veiled girl from the boat. The girl lifts her veil and shows Ma Pu and Ma Tin her true face: Aye Aye, safe and sound, despite their murder attempt. The village banishes the jealous sisters, and Aye Aye lives in peace with her husband and their son.

In an untitled Burmese tale translated by Reginald Burton Dennis and published in the Journal of the Burma Research Society, a king has two sons. When the monarch dies, the younger son turns the elder into a King Cobra, making him alternate between human and serpentine shapes every sunrise and sunset, and usurps the throne. The King Cobra wanders through the land and creeps into an earthenware jar that a widow uses to store rice. One day, the woman goes to fetch some rice, and the King Cobra coils around her arm. In order to release the cobra's grip, she promises to marry one of her three daughters: the cobra coils even harder when it hears the elder daughters' names, but uncoils when it hears the youngest's. The widow calls for her daughters, and her youngest complies with her decision, marrying the cobra. Some days later, the youngest daughter tells her mother the king cobra husband becomes a man at night and goes back to being a snake by daylight, so the widow suggests a course of action. That same night, the girl feigns illness, takes a brazier and lights a fire to burn her husband's snakeskin. While her husband goes to fetch her some water, the she throws the snakeskin in the fire. The next morning, the man tries to find his snakeskin, and his wife says she destroyed it. The man explains that now he is human, he must return and fight for his throne. One day, he leaves his wife in her mother's care, since she is pregnant, and departs. The girl's elder sisters, realizing their cadette married a prince and is set to become a queen, decide to get rid of her: they invite her to play on a swing by the river bank. The girl declines at first, but eventually agrees. While she is on the swing, the elder sisters shove her so hard she is flung off to a bush near the shore, and leave her for dead. Fortunately for her, a huge pelican finds her and brings her to its nest atop a silk-cotton tree (which Reginald Burton Dennis stated is the tree species Bombax malabaricum), where she is cared for and gives birth to her son. The girl (at this point, her name is given: Me Dwe) rocks her son with a song, calling him the "Snake King's son" and referring to his father as "Great Royal Serpent". The pelican is irritated and threatens to beak them, so Me Dwe alters the song to call her baby the pelican's son. After the prince deposes his brother and crowns himself king, he returns home to his wife, but cannot find her there. He wanders off until he reaches the river bank, when he hears his wife's voice singing a song to their son atop the tree. He waits until the pelican has flown away, then rescues his wife and son and brings them to his kingdom.

In a Burmese tale from the Taungyo people translated into Russian with the title "Заколдованный принц" ("Enchanted Prince"), a poor widow has seven daughters. One day, the whole family goes to gather mangoes with their baskets in the mango grove. However, they see a large serpent between the trees, with its head on a tree and its tail on another. They crawl under the tree and decide to wait for the fruits to fall, to no avail. The widow then approaches the large snake and offers her eldest daughter in marriage for the animal if it can provide some fruits for her family. The serpent does as requested. Interested in getting more, the widow keeps subsequently offering her daughters if the snake gives her more and more fruits. After doing so, the widow and her daughters make a turn home with their baskets filled to the brim, and pass by a rock and a tree stump, which the widow bribes with a mango for them to keep mum about their return. The family reach home. Back to the boa constrictor, it senses something amiss and follows the widow's trail, passing by the rock and tree stump. The rock and the tree stump lie that they have not seen any woman passing by, but the boa threatens the objects to tell it the truth. The objects then direct the boa to the pathway leading to the girls' home. The boa slithers to the widow's house and hides in a corner. The family does their chores until dark and outside in the garden. A neighbour comes to ask for mustard, and the widow sends the eldest daughter to fetch it. The eldest daughter fears there is a snake inside the house, so the widow herself goes to do it. Suddenly, the boa jumps at her and coils around her body. The widow begs for her life and offers her youngest daughter as the snake's wife. The boa releases the woman and marries the youngest daughter, a beautiful girl name Mi Thue. The tale explains that the boa is in fact a prince cursed under a serpentine form that assumes human form at night and resumes his snake appearance in the day. One day, the widow chastises her cadette for the sleeping husband, when Mi Thue explains that her snake husband is sleeping in his human form, and cannot be woken up, lest he returns to snake form. The widow does not believe her daughter's words and goes to check on her son-in-law: she finds a handsome person sleeping. The widow then laments that a handsome man is hiding under a snakeskin and burns it, keeping him human for good. Sometime later, Mi Thue tells her now human snake husband that she is pregnant, so he goes to the town for some business, leaving his wife unprotected. Mi Thue's sister, Mi Le, decides to get rid of her sister and marry the prince herself, since she has fallen in love with his human appearance. Mi Le invites Mi Thue for a walk in the garden, and places her on a swing. Mi Le shoves the swing high so that Mi Thue falls in the river and is washed away. Thinking she got rid of her sister, Mi Le returns home and feigns distress for her sister's vanishing. The snake prince returns home, learns of his wife's disappearance, and goes to look for her in the river. He reaches the mouth of the river and sees his wife, alive, but atop the branches of a submerged banyan tree, holding a baby and guarded by a pelican. When the pelican flies off, the prince goes to rescue his wife and son.

==== Moken people ====
Austrian anthropologist Hugo Bernatzik collected a tale from the Moken people with the title The frog and the maiden, which he considered to have "Malay influence". In this tale, three sisters live together and the youngest has a frog as a lover. After the frog leaves on a boat, the sisters quarrel and the eldest tosses the youngest into the ocean. The girl swims for her life, but her strength gives out. Fortunately for her, a tree emerges from the water and she climbs it. Atop the tree, the girl, who is pregnant, prays for her lover to come, and two days later the frog appears on a boat to rescue her from the tree. The frog hides her in a basket, then sails home to his sisters-in-law, asking them about his lover. The elder sisters try to deceive him, and go on the boat. They bump into the basket, and the girl inside "made water". Seeing the liquid, the frog tells the sisters-in-law it is oil, and the girls smear the liquid on their skin. Suddenly, their youngest sister springs out of the basket, to the elders' horror, who die on the spot. The frog becomes a human male and lives with his wife.

==== East Timor ====
In an East Timorese tale titled Samodo, a woman named Cassa-Láqui gives birth to a samodo, which is a venomous green serpent. Cassa-Láqui thinks about killing the animal, but she spares him and raises the cobra as her son. Years later, the samodo son asks his mother to court the seven sisters of a distant maternal uncle, by giving a rich dowry to the prospective bride: the sisters each reject the proposal for his snake form, save for the youngest, Soce-Bere, who agrees to the marriage. The samodo son then sends his wife and his mother on celebration, while he takes off the serpent skin to become a handsome youth and attend the festival for a while week. Soce-Bere notice the stranger, while her sisters go to their samodo brother-in-law's house and discover a discarded snakeskin, which they hide. Samodo reappears in human shape to them and demands the snakeskin back, which is to hang on a fountain. Soce-Bere's marriage with Samodo is a happy and fortunate one, to her sisters' intense jealousy. While Samodo is away, Soce-Bere is invited by the sisters to go play on a swing by the sea. After she sits on the swing, the girls shove the swing with such strength Soce-Bere is flung away into the sea to drown. Soce-Bere survives and clings to the back of a crocodile, where she gives birth to Samodo's son. Samodo himself comes back on a ship and rescues his wife, then lands and punishes his sisters-in-law.

In a Timorese tale collected in Viqueque with the Portuguese title A Lenda do Homem-Cobra ("Legend of the Snake-Man"), an old man named Leki lives with his seven daughters and is neighbours with an old woman named Hare. Hare lives alone, takes care of her crops and goes to fetch firewood in the forest. One day, she notices she is carrying a particularly heavy bundle with herself, and finds a snake inside it. The woman fears for the snake, but the animal talks to her and asks to be taken to her house, where it can rest. The woman agrees and lets the animal live with her, placing the reptile inside a basket. Some time later, the reptile turns into a man, who helps Hare in her domestic chores. One day, the snake passes by Leki's house and sights the seven beautiful daughters, wishing to marry one of them, so he asks Hare to court one of the girls on his behalf. Hare goes to visit Leki with fruits and corn, but the man's daughters reject her proposal due to her poverty. She keeps insisting so much that Leki's youngest daughter's, Bui Iku, curiosity is piqued, and she goes to check on their neighbour, who they know lives alone. Bui Iku finds the handsome snake man inside Hare's house and wants to marry him. The snake-man and Hare are very happy with Bui Iku's answer, and the snake-man moves out to a larger house which he buys with the earnings of his work. One year later, Bui Iku is pregnant, and her snake husband goes on a trip overseas to buy clothes and other provisions for his firstborn. While he is away, Bui Iku's sisters decide to visit their cadette to learn more about the snake husband, since he has become a respected member of the local communities, despite coming from a lineage of snakes that can shapeshift into human beings. Bui Iku's sisters try to destroy her marriage out of pure jealousy, and one of them, Kassa, decides to invite Bui Iku for a bath in the sea, intending to drown her there. All the while, both women converse about the snake husband, with Kassa trying to convince Bui Iku the snake will eventually kill her due to his serpentine nature, but Bui Iku has none of it and believes in her husband's reputation. Defeated, Kassa drowns Bui Iku and leaves her for dead, returning to her sisters. However, Bui Iku survives, for the waves wash her ashore a secluded island with a coconut tree and a rooster. Spending her days there on the island, Bui Iku laments her fate, her cries echoing to reach her husband's ship, which is just returning from a journey. The snake hears his wife's voice growing louder, finds her on the island, and takes her back with him. When his ship docks, Kassa comes to see her brother-in-law and finds Bui Iku has been rescued. Enraged, she enters their house to destroy the snake-man's gifts from the journey, but Bui Iku discovers her and kills her with a knife. She and her husband bury her in the yard, and an eggplant sprouts from her grave, its thorny leaves prickling anyone who dares touch it. In time, the snake man's son (Mane Mesak) is born, and when he, as a child, goes to see the plant, Kassa's voice orders her to stay away. Mane Mesak tells the incident to his parents and they decide to burn the plant. The tale then segues into Mane Mesak's youth.

== See also ==
- Champavati
- The Story of the Hamadryad
- The King of the Snakes
- Princess Baleng and the Snake King
- Sọ Dừa (Vietnamese folktale)
