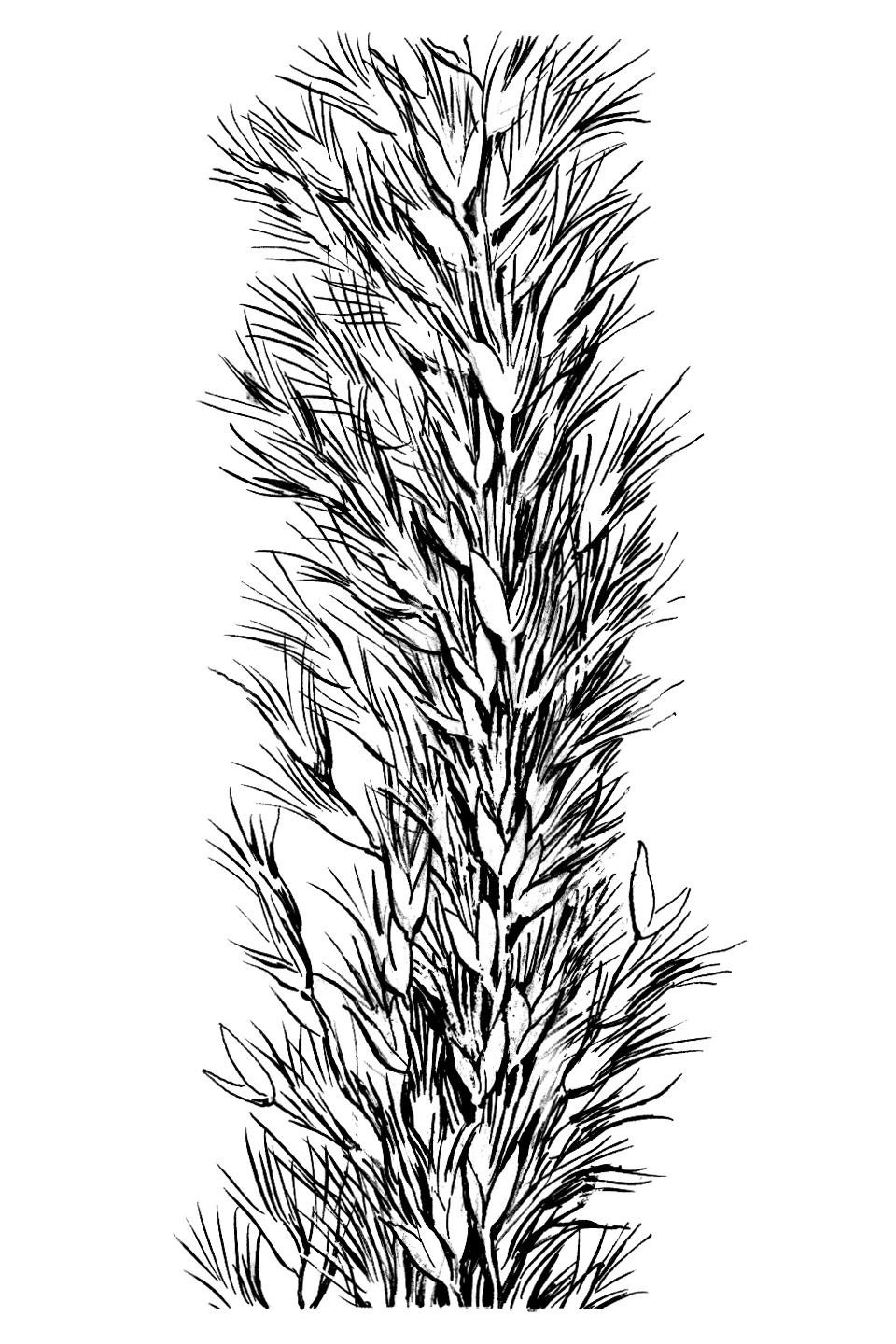
- Pappophorum bicolor

Scientific classification
- Kingdom: Plantae
- Clade: Tracheophytes
- Clade: Angiosperms
- Clade: Monocots
- Clade: Commelinids
- Order: Poales
- Family: Poaceae
- Subfamily: Chloridoideae
- Tribe: Cynodonteae
- Subtribe: Pappophorinae
- Genus: Pappophorum; Schreb.

Type species
- Pappophorum alopecuroideum (syn of P. pappiferum) Vahl.

Synonyms
- Polyrhaphis Lindl.

= Pappophorum =

Genus of grasses

Pappophorum is a genus of plants in the grass family, native to the Western Hemisphere. Members of the genus are commonly known as pappusgrass.

Species

- Pappophorum bicolor E.Fourn. – pink pappusgrass - Texas, Chihuahua, Coahuila, Durango, Guanajuato, D.F., Veracruz, Nuevo León, Tamaulipas, San Luis Potosí
- Pappophorum caespitosum R.E.Fr. - Bolivia, Argentina, Paraguay
- Pappophorum hassleri Hack. - Paraguay
- Pappophorum krapovickasii Roseng. - Bolivia, Argentina, Paraguay, Brazil
- Pappophorum mucronulatum Nees - Arizona, New Mexico, Texas, Mexico, Honduras, Colombia, Venezuela, Peru, Brazil, Argentina, Paraguay, Uruguay
- Pappophorum pappiferum (Lam.) Kuntze – limestone pappusgrass - Mexico, West Indies, South America
- Pappophorum philippianum Parodi - Brazil, Bolivia, Argentina, Uruguay, Chile, Sonora

formerly included

see Bouteloua Bromus Enneapogon Pentameris Triodia

- Pappophorum abyssinicum - Enneapogon cenchroides
- Pappophorum arabicum - Enneapogon desvauxii
- Pappophorum aucheri - Enneapogon persicus
- Pappophorum avenaceum - Enneapogon avenaceus
- Pappophorum benguellense - Enneapogon scaber
- Pappophorum boreale - Enneapogon desvauxii
- Pappophorum brachystachyum - Enneapogon desvauxii
- Pappophorum bulbosum - Enneapogon desvauxii
- Pappophorum caerulescens - Enneapogon caerulescens
- Pappophorum cenchroides - Enneapogon cenchroides
- Pappophorum commune - Enneapogon nigricans
- Pappophorum elegans - Enneapogon persicus
- Pappophorum eutrianoides - Bouteloua megapotamica
- Pappophorum fasciculatum - Enneapogon desvauxii
- Pappophorum figarianum - Enneapogon desvauxii
- Pappophorum filifolium - Enneapogon scoparius
- Pappophorum flavescens - Enneapogon nigricans
- Pappophorum foxii - Enneapogon foxii
- Pappophorum glandulosum - Pentameris pallida
- Pappophorum glumosum - Enneapogon persicus
- Pappophorum gracile - Enneapogon gracilis
- Pappophorum jaminianum - Enneapogon desvauxii
- Pappophorum laxum - Enneapogon scaber
- Pappophorum lindleyanum - Enneapogon lindleyanus
- Pappophorum megapotamicum - Bouteloua megapotamica
- Pappophorum mexicanum - Enneapogon desvauxii
- Pappophorum molle - Enneapogon cenchroides
- Pappophorum nanum - Enneapogon desvauxii
- Pappophorum nigricans - Enneapogon nigricans
- Pappophorum pallidum - Enneapogon pallidus
- Pappophorum persicum - Enneapogon persicus
- Pappophorum phleoides - Enneapogon desvauxii
- Pappophorum pumilio - Bromus pumilio
- Pappophorum pungens - Triodia bitextura
- Pappophorum purpurascens - Enneapogon purpurascens
- Pappophorum pusillum - Enneapogon desvauxii
- Pappophorum robustum - Enneapogon cenchroides
- Pappophorum scabrum - Enneapogon scaber
- Pappophorum schimperianum - Enneapogon persicus
- Pappophorum scoparium - Enneapogon scoparius
- Pappophorum senegalense - Enneapogon cenchroides
- Pappophorum setifolium - Enneapogon scoparius
- Pappophorum sinaicum - Bromus pumilio
- Pappophorum squarrosum - Bromus pumilio
- Pappophorum turcomanicum - Enneapogon persicus
- Pappophorum vincentianum - Enneapogon desvauxii
- Pappophorum virens - Enneapogon virens
- Pappophorum wrightii - Enneapogon desvauxii
