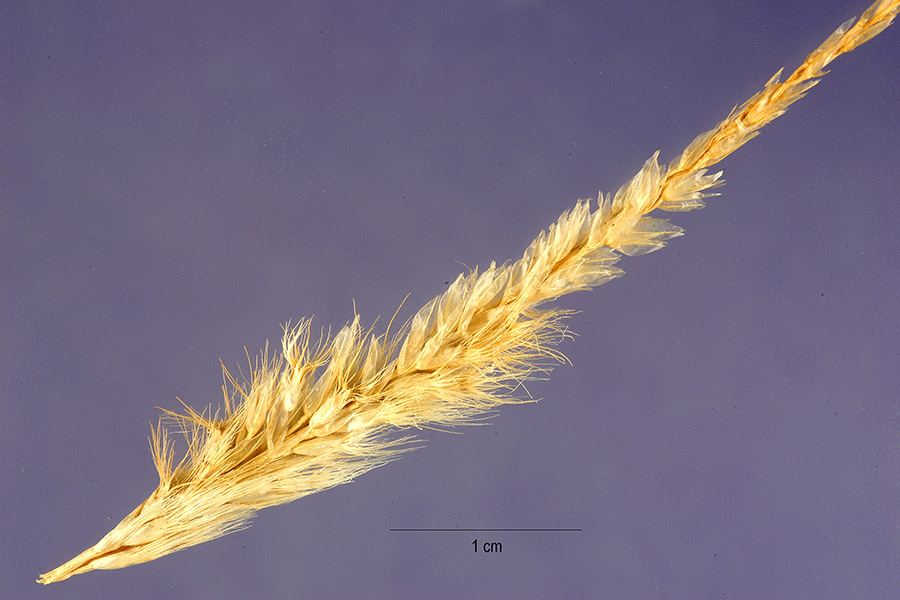

Conservation status
- Secure (NatureServe)

Scientific classification
- Kingdom: Plantae
- Clade: Tracheophytes
- Clade: Angiosperms
- Clade: Monocots
- Clade: Commelinids
- Order: Poales
- Family: Poaceae
- Subfamily: Chloridoideae
- Genus: Pappophorum
- Species: P. vaginatum

Binomial name
- Pappophorum vaginatum Buckley

= Pappophorum vaginatum =

Species of grass

Pappophorum vaginatum is a species of grass known by the common name whiplash pappusgrass. It is native to the Americas, where it occurs in Arizona, Texas, northern Mexico, and part of South America extending from Uruguay to Argentina.

This perennial grass grows up to a meter tall. The leaves are up to 20 or 30 centimeters. They curl when dry. The narrowed panicle is whitish or tawny in color, sometimes tinged with purple.

This grass grows in valleys, on plains, and on roadsides. It may grow alongside pink pappusgrass. It is also associated with Arizona cottontop, alkali sacaton, and vine mesquite. It is sometimes used for revegetation efforts and roadside seeding.
