= Ystad Djurpark =

Zoo in Ystad, Sweden

Coordinates: 55.4863°N 13.7193°E

Ystad djurpark
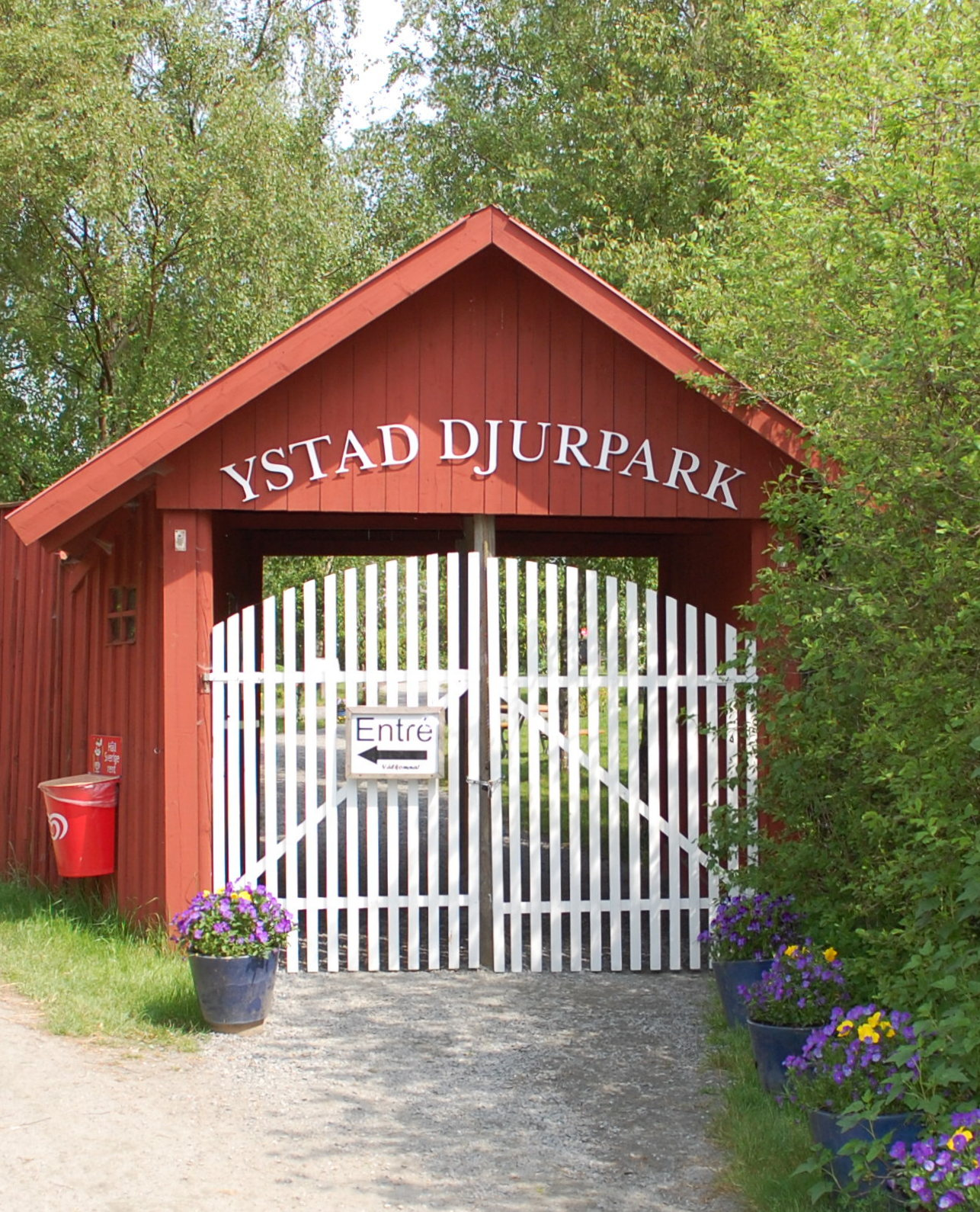
- Interactive map of Ystad djurpark
- Date opened: 1998
- No. of animals: 250
- No. of species: 60
- Website: http://www.ystaddjurpark.se

Ystad djurpark is a zoo 10 km northwest from the town Ystad, and is the most southern zoo in Sweden.

The zoo displays exotic animals from around the world and many different native breeds located by a large farmhouse (600 m2), as well as monkeys, lemurs, meerkats, birds and reptiles. In all, Ystad djurpark currently have around 60 different species. The zoo is closed in the wintertime, and open May 1 - September 30 (closed June 6 and 21).

New-borns in 2014 were: lemurs, bison, eland, mara, muntjac, wallaby as well as cows, pigs, goats and sheep.
