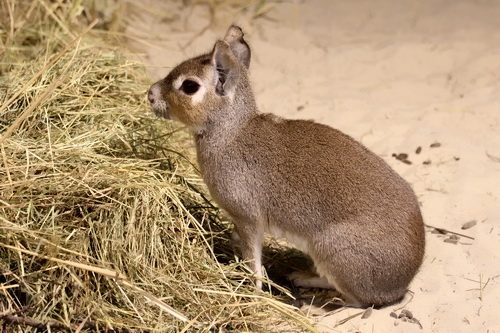

Conservation status
- Least Concern (IUCN 3.1)

Scientific classification
- Kingdom: Animalia
- Phylum: Chordata
- Class: Mammalia
- Order: Rodentia
- Family: Caviidae
- Genus: Dolichotis
- Species: D. salinicola

Binomial name
- Dolichotis salinicola Burmeister, 1876
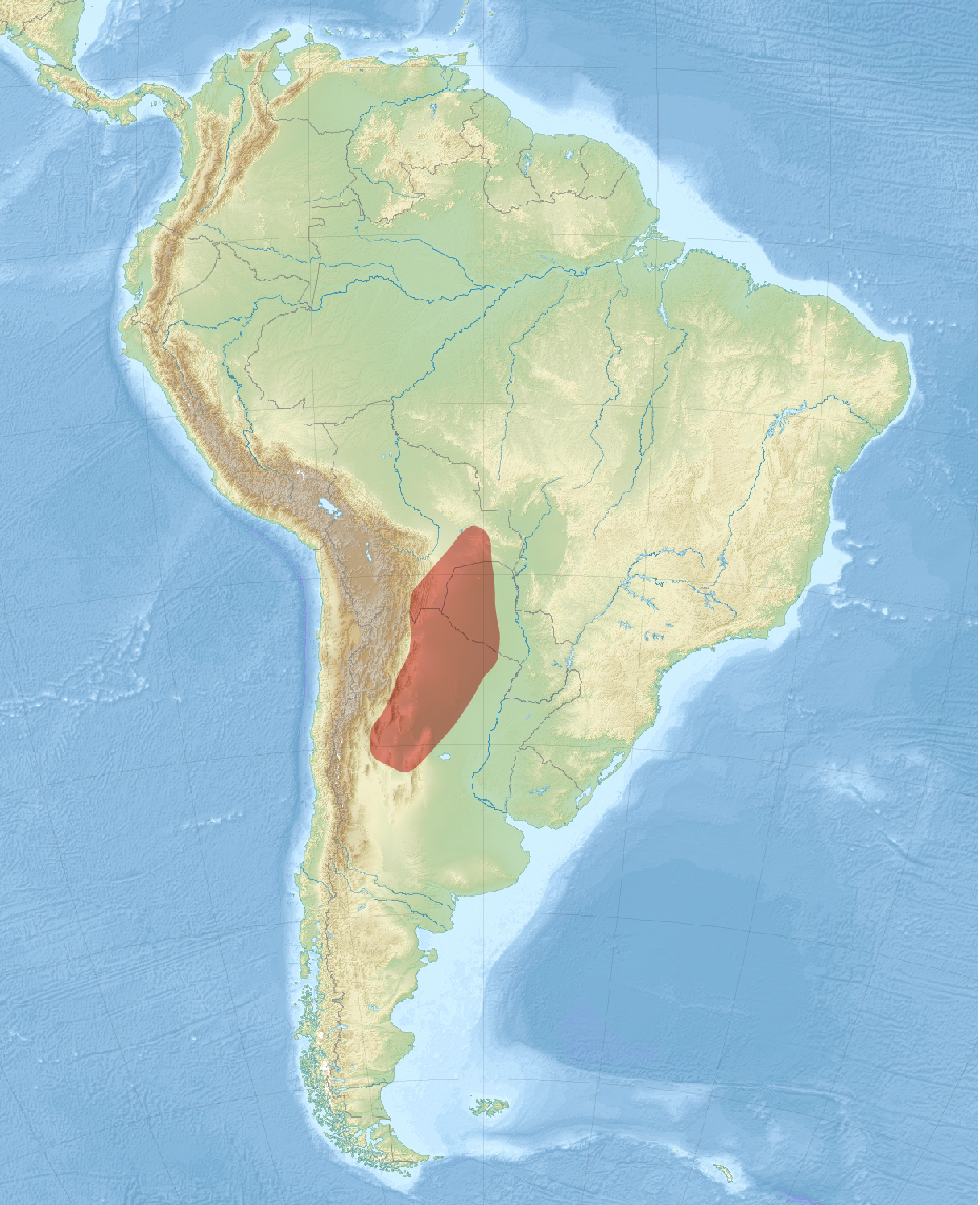

Synonyms
- Pediolagus salinicola

= Chacoan mara =

Chacoan mara Temporal range: Pleistocene–recent

Species of rodent

The Chacoan mara (Dolichotis salinicola) or Chacoan cavy is a relatively large South American rodent of the cavy family. They are a close relative of the better known Patagonian mara.

== Taxonomy ==
Until recently Pediolagus was considered synonymous with Dolichotis and the Chacoan mara was a member of that genus. However, a 2020 study by the American Society of Mammalogists found significant difference between the two mara species to warrant resurrecting Pediolagus. Conversely, a 2021 study indicated that Pediolagus should be included in Dolichotis alongside the fossil species D. chapalmalense, D. major, and D. intermedia, and that the retention of Pediolagus would cause taxonomic issues and confusion for these fossil species. The American Society of Mammalogists and IUCN continue to recognize this species as a member of Dolichotis.

== Habitat ==
The Chacoan mara lives in the South American Chaco, the dry thorny forests and grasslands of Argentina, Paraguay, and Bolivia. Maras dig a burrow to sleep in at night.

== Ecology ==
The Chacoan mara eat grasses and other herbage. They will eat nearly any available vegetation. Specifically, they select forbs, grasses, succulents, and trees in the dry season and grasses in the wet season. Annual forbs are eaten in the wet season as well.

Despite the Chaocan cavy's close resemblance and coexistence to the Patagonian mara, they have a broader niche to allow coexistence with its relative. This flexibility is reflected by its subfamily's high diversity, recorded as early as the late Miocene epoch.

Chacoan maras live in small groups of up to four animals.
