= Enneapogon elegans =

Scientific classification
- Kingdom: Plantae
- Clade: Tracheophytes
- Clade: Angiosperms
- Clade: Monocots
- Clade: Commelinids
- Order: Poales
- Family: Poaceae
- Subfamily: Chloridoideae
- Genus: Enneapogon
- Species: E. elegans

Binomial name
- Enneapogon elegans (Nees ex Steud.) Stapf

Synonyms
- Calotheria elegans Wight & Arn. ex Steud.; Pappophorum elegans Nees ex Steud.

Species of grass

Enneapogon elegans is a species of plant in the grass family. It is found in Burma and Tamil Nadu, India.
