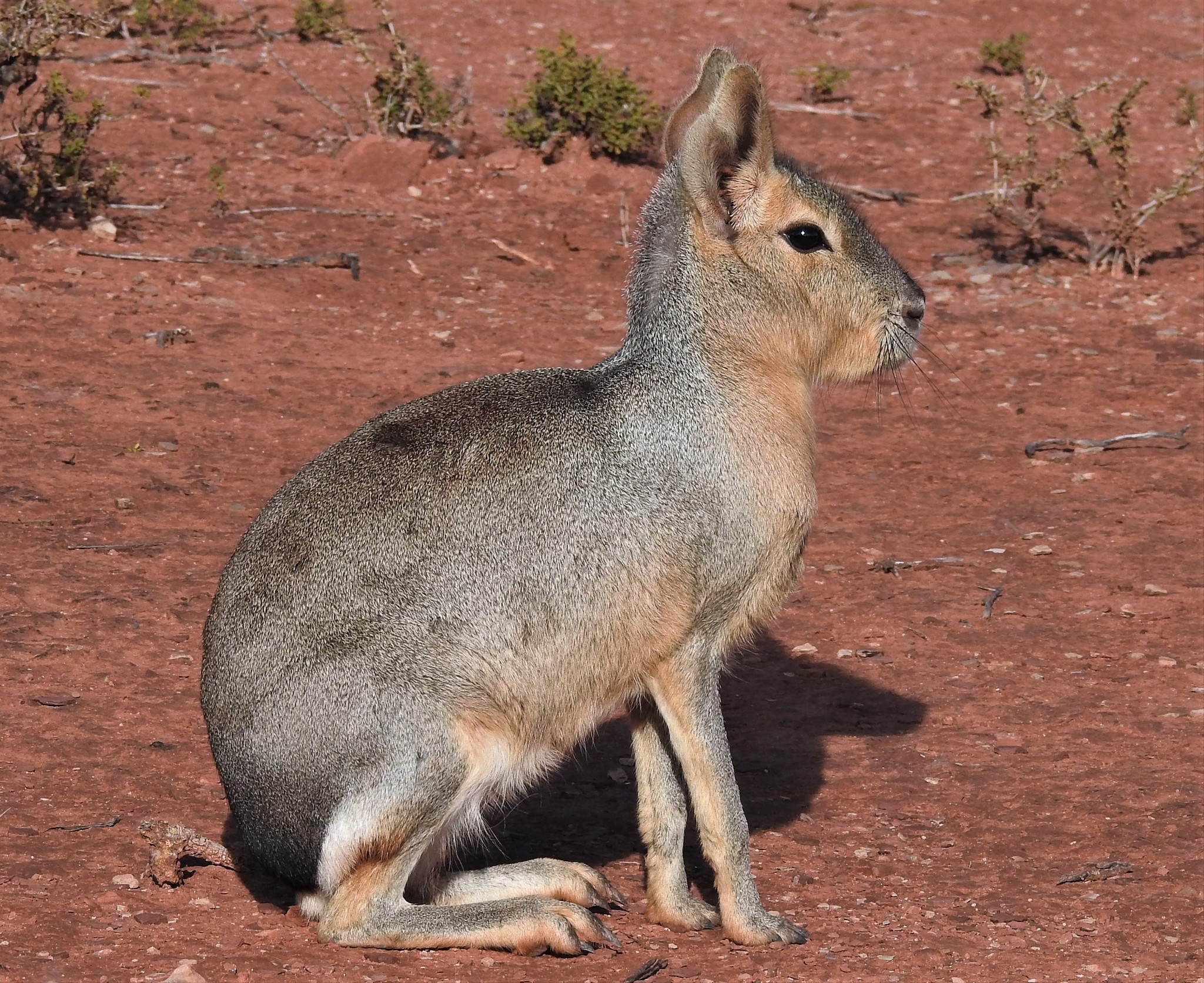
- At Sierra de las Quijadas National Park in San Luis Province, Argentina

Conservation status
- Near Threatened (IUCN 3.1)

Scientific classification
- Kingdom: Animalia
- Phylum: Chordata
- Class: Mammalia
- Order: Rodentia
- Family: Caviidae
- Genus: Dolichotis
- Species: D. patagonum

Binomial name
- Dolichotis patagonum (Zimmermann, 1780)
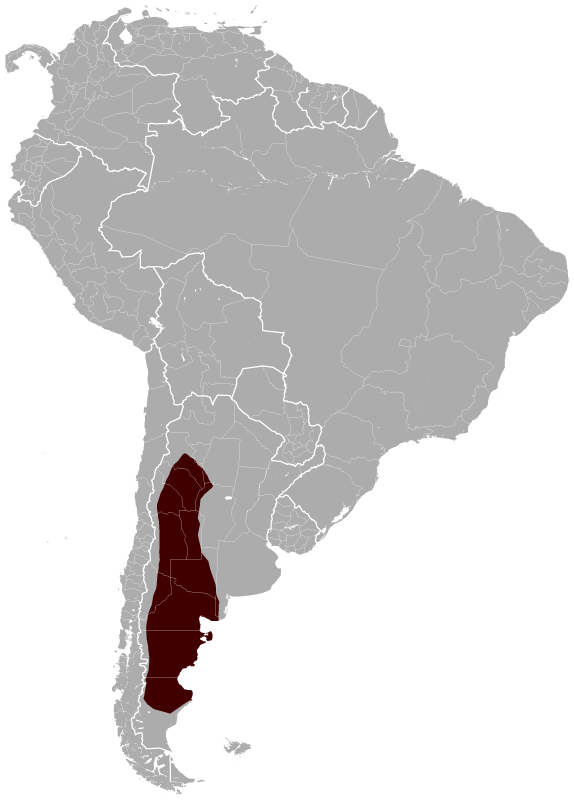
- native range

= Patagonian mara =

Patagonian mara Temporal range: Pleistocene - Holocene

Species of rodent

The Patagonian mara (Dolichotis patagonum) is a rodent in the mara genus Dolichotis. It is also known as the Patagonian cavy or Patagonian hare. This herbivorous, somewhat rabbit-like animal is found in open and semi-open habitats in Argentina, including large parts of Patagonia. It is monogamous, but often breeds in warrens shared by several pairs.

== Description ==
The Patagonian mara resembles a jackrabbit. It has distinctive upright ears and long limbs. Its hind limbs are longer and more muscular than its fore limbs and it has a longer radius than humerus. The feet are compressed, making them hoof-like, which contributes to Patagonian maras resembling small ungulates, especially when standing or walking. The fore feet have four digits, while the hind feet have three digits. Its tail is short, depressed, and hairless. It has a gray dorsal pelage with a white patch on the rump separated from the dorsal fur by a black area. In addition, the mara has a white underside with a somewhat orange flank and chin. The typical Patagonian mara has a head and body length of 69–75 cm (27–30 in) with a tail of 4–5 cm (1.6–2.0 in). It weighs 8–16 kg (18–35 lb). Unlike most other caviids, such as guinea pigs and capybaras, the anal glands of the mara are between the anus and the base of the tail rather than being anterior to the anus.

== Ecology and activity ==
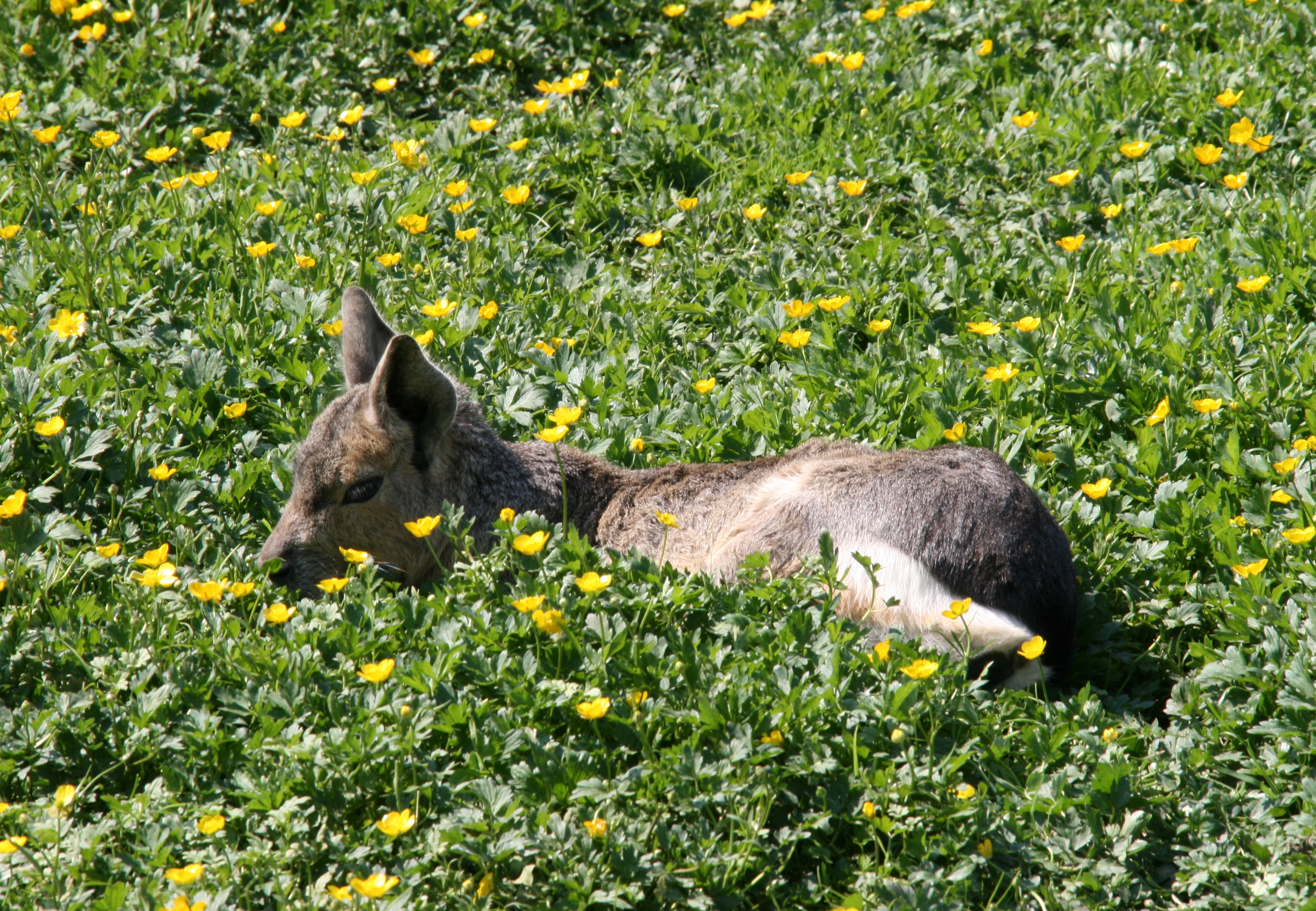
Mara foraging

Patagonian maras are found only in Argentina, from 28 to 50°S. They prefer to live in habitats with shrub cover, but they also inhabit overgrazed and barren soils in the Monte Desert biome. In northwestern Argentina, they primarily inhabit lowland habitats such as forest and creosote bush or larrea. Maras prefer sandy and low-shrub habitat in Valdes Peninsula. They have adapted well to a cursorial lifestyle on the open plains and steppe, with long legs, reduced clavicles, and well-developed sensory organs making them capable of running and communicating in these open habitats. When running, maras have been compared to deer and antelope. Maras are largely herbivorous. They feed primarily on green vegetation and fruit. In the Monte Desert, monocots make up 70% of their diet, while dicots make up 30%. Preferred grass species eaten are those of the genera Chloris, Pappophorum, and Trichloris, while dicots that are eaten include Atriplex lampa, Lycium spp., and Prosopis spp.

Maras are primarily diurnal and around 46% of their daily activities involve feeding. Their temporal activity rhythms are related to environmental factors. Light, precipitation, and temperature have positive effects on annual activities, while darkness and relative humidity have negative effects. The daily activity of maras is unimodal in winter and bimodal in other seasons. Their preferred temperature is around 20 °C or 68 °F. Females spend more time feeding than the males, due to the demands of gestation and lactation. Males spend most of the day sitting and being vigilant for predators. Predators of maras, particularly the young, are felids, grisons, foxes, and birds of prey. Maras are also hosts for parasites such as the nematode worm Wellcomia dolichotis.

== Social behavior and reproduction ==
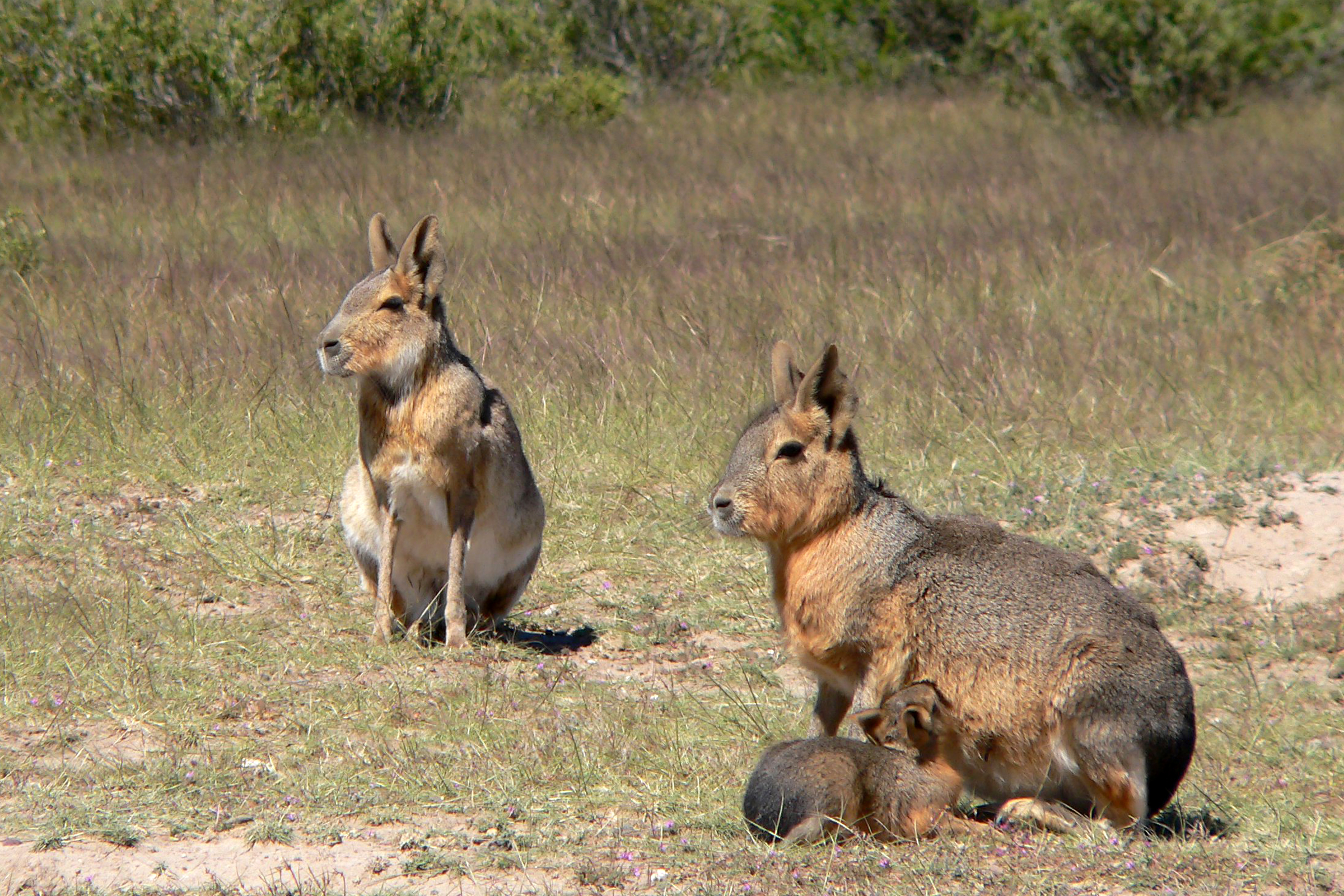
Mara pair with young

Their social organizations have a unique combination of monogamy and communal breeding. Being monogamous, pairs of maras stay together for life, with replacement of partners only occurring after one's death. The male has almost the sole responsibility in maintaining the pair by following the female wherever she goes. A male marks his female with urine and marks the ground around her with secretions from his glands and with feces, making the grounds around the female a mobile territory. Pairs breed together alone or with other pairs in warrens shared by up to 29 pairs. Maras breed, at least in southern Argentina, from August to January. Gestation lasts 100 days in wild. Most births in Patagonia occur between September and October, which is before the summer dry season and after the winter rains. Females produce one litter each year in the wild, but can produce as many as four litters a year in captivity. Young can walk almost immediately postpartum.

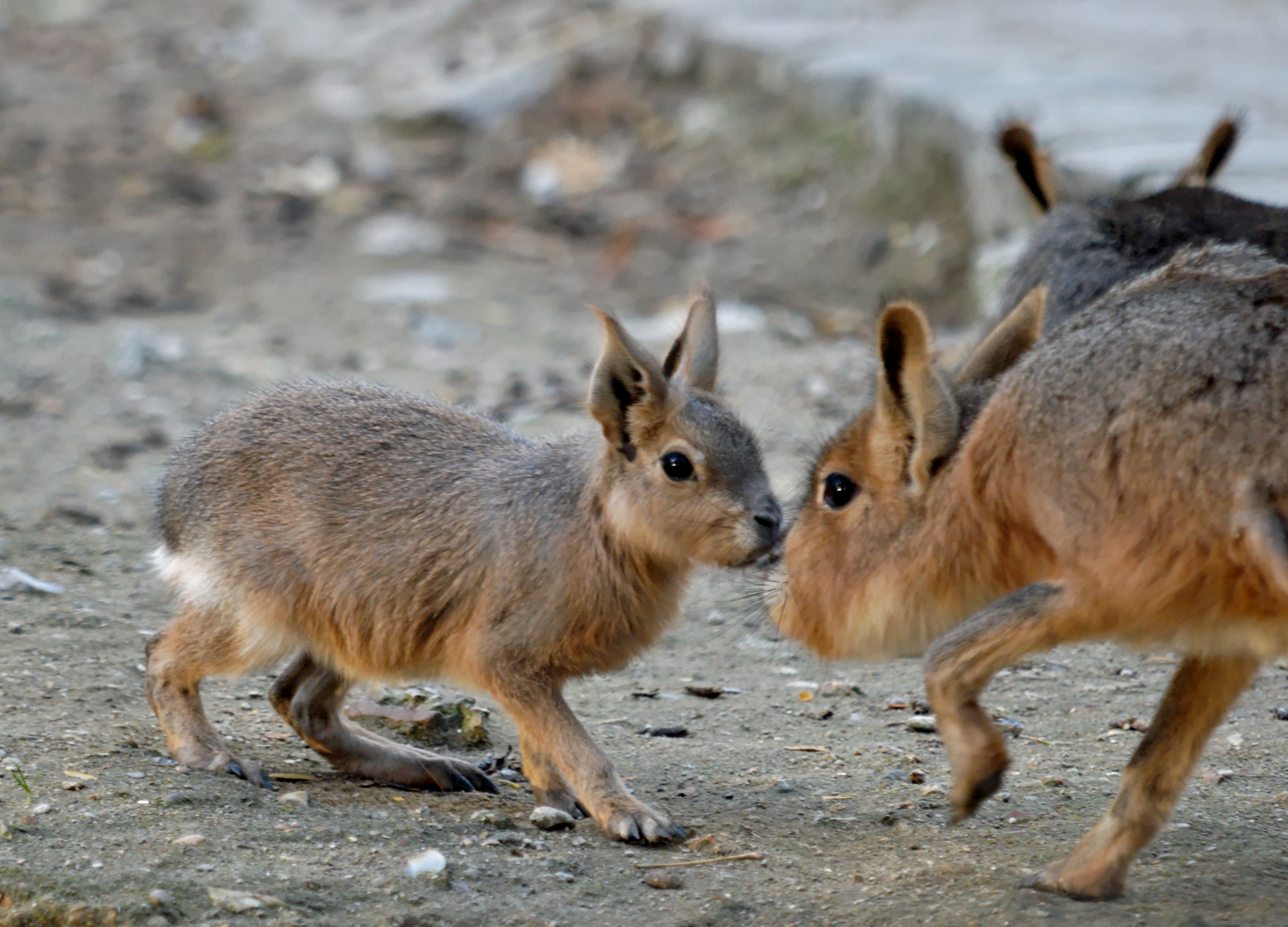
Young mara and older one sniffing each other, from the zoological garden of the Jardin des plantes in Paris

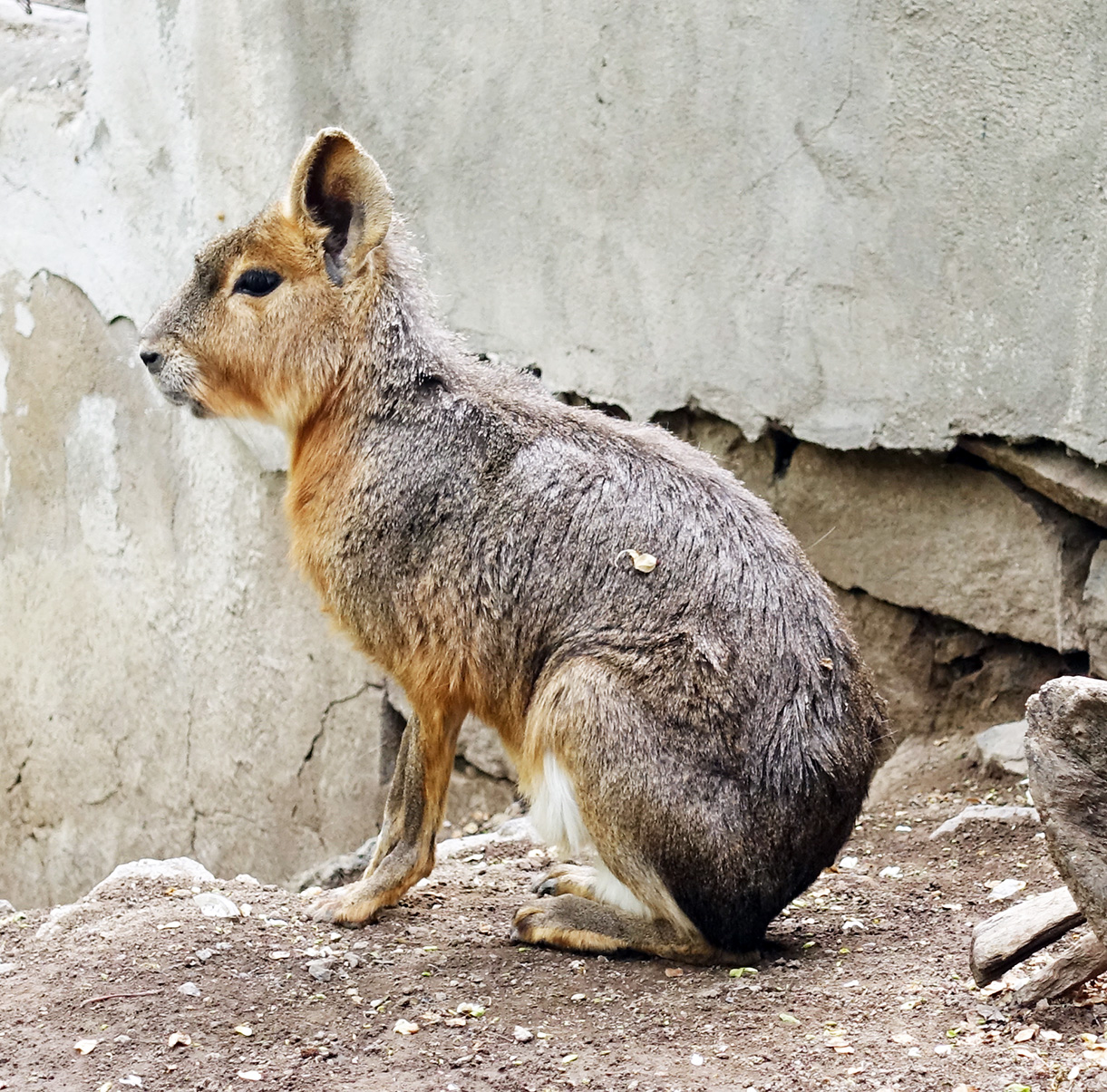
Mara at Yerevan Zoo, Armenia

Dens are dug during the breeding season for the young to be raised. Litters from one to 22 pairs are grouped together in these dens. Communal living provides protection from predators, with the survival rate for young being higher in larger groups than in smaller groups. One pair visits the den at a time for around one hour and the other parents circle around the den. One or two pups are nursed at a time by a female. A female may sometimes nurse a young from another pair. While a female may prevent young other than her own from nursing her, some young are able to steal milk. Mothers do not actively cooperate in raising their young. For the first three weeks, young remain near the den. At this time, distance between individuals is low, with frequent body contact, huddling, allogrooming, and extended play among the pups. After this, the young are able to leave the den and graze with their parents. Young are weaned after 13 weeks.

Maras make a number of vocalizations during grazing or slow locomotion. When seeking contact, a mara emits an inflected "wheet", while a low, repetitive grunt is made when following a conspecific. Maras tooth chatter and emit low grunts when threatened. They also produce a series of short grunts when grooming. Scent marking is used by maras for complex and intense social interactions. Maras stretch and sniff the soil and then sit upright with an arched back and the anogenital area flattened to the ground, a process known as anal digging. In addition, a male stands on his hind legs and urinates on a female's rump, to which the female responds by spraying a jet of urine backwards into the face of the male. The male's urination is meant to repel other males from his partner, while the female's urination is a rejection of any approaching male when she is not receptive. Both anal digging and urination are more frequent during the breeding season and are more commonly done by males.

== Status ==
A Patagonian mara family in Southwick's Zoo - note pup nursing.

Patagonian maras are considered to be a near threatened species. Historically, maras have ranged from north-central Argentina south almost to Tierra del Fuego. Nevertheless, maras have been greatly affected by hunting and habitat alteration and have been extirpated in some areas, including Buenos Aires Province. Mara skins have been used for bedspreads and rugs.

A population of as many as 200 maras lives in the Al Marmoom Desert Conservation Reserve, in the central part of the United Arab Emirates, possibly from escaped pets.
