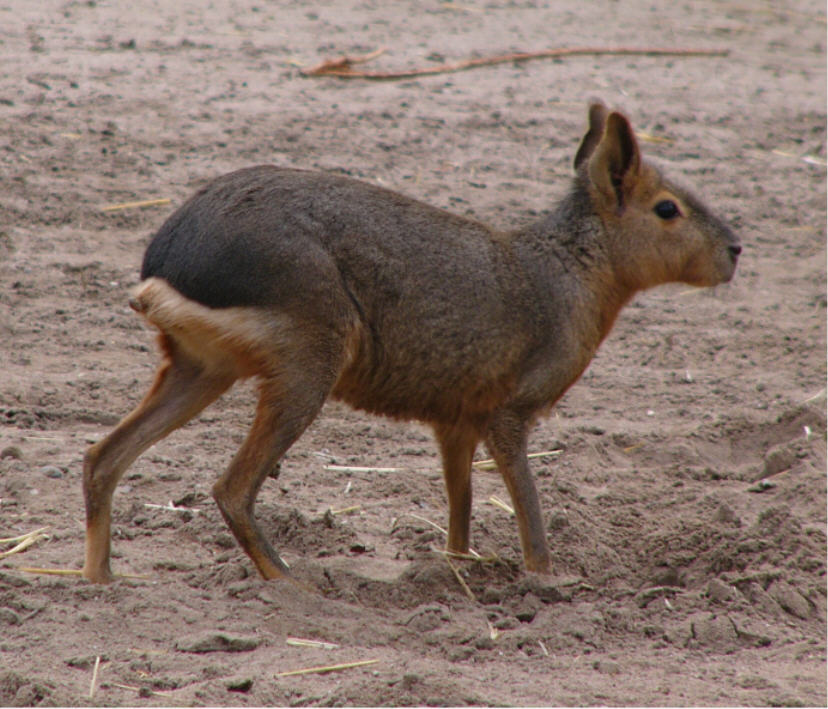
- A male Patagonian mara

Scientific classification
- Kingdom: Animalia
- Phylum: Chordata
- Class: Mammalia
- Infraclass: Placentalia
- Order: Rodentia
- Family: Caviidae
- Subfamily: Dolichotinae
- Genus: Dolichotis; Desmarest, 1820

Type species
- Cavia patachonica Shaw, 1801 (= Cavia patagonum Zimmermann, 1780)

Species
- D. patagonum, Patagonian mara; D. salinicola, Chacoan mara; †D. intermedia Ameghino 1889; †D. platycephala Ameghino 1889
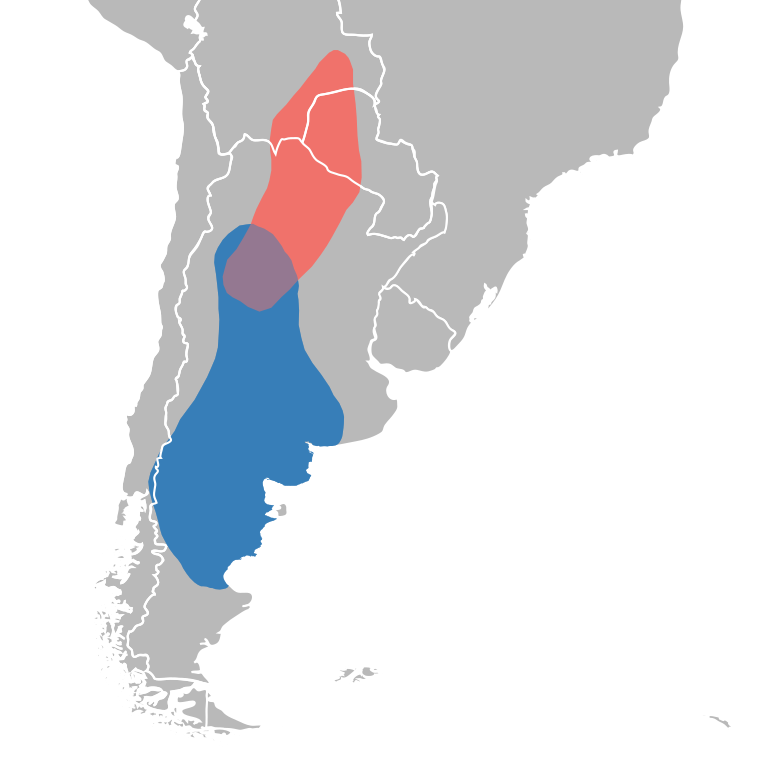
- Dolichotis distribution D. patagonum in blue, D. salinicola in red, purple where ranges overlap

= Dolichotis =

Genus of rodents

Dolichotis is a genus of the cavy family of rodents. These large relatives of guinea pigs are common in the Patagonian steppes of Argentina, but also live in Paraguay and elsewhere in South America. It contains a single extant species, the Patagonian mara, which is one of the largest rodents in the world after the two species each of capybaras and beavers, and the large species of porcupines, reaching about 45 cm (18 in) in height.

The Chacoan mara has and sometimes still is also considered a member of this genus. However, a 2020 study by the American Society of Mammalogists found significant difference between the two mara species to warrant placing it in the genus Pediolagus.

== Etymology ==
Dolichotis means "long-eared", from Ancient Greek "δολιχός" (dolikhos) meaning "long" and "οὖς" (ous) meaning "ear".

== Species ==
Two extant and two extinct species of in this genus are recognized:

Image	Scientific name	Common name	Distribution
	Dolichotis patagonum	Patagonian mara	Argentina
	Dolichotis salinicola	Chacoan mara	Argentina, Paraguay and Bolivia

Fossil species

- †D. intermedia Ameghino, 1889
- †D. platycephala Ameghino, 1889

Fossils are known from Argentina:

- Montehermosan
  - Andalhuala Formation
- Huayquerian
  - Chiquimil Formation
- Chapadmalalan
  - Barranca de los Lobos Formation
  - San Andrés Formation
- Ensenadan
  - Vorohué Formation
  - Yupoí Formation
- Lujanian
  - Luján Formation

== Gallery ==
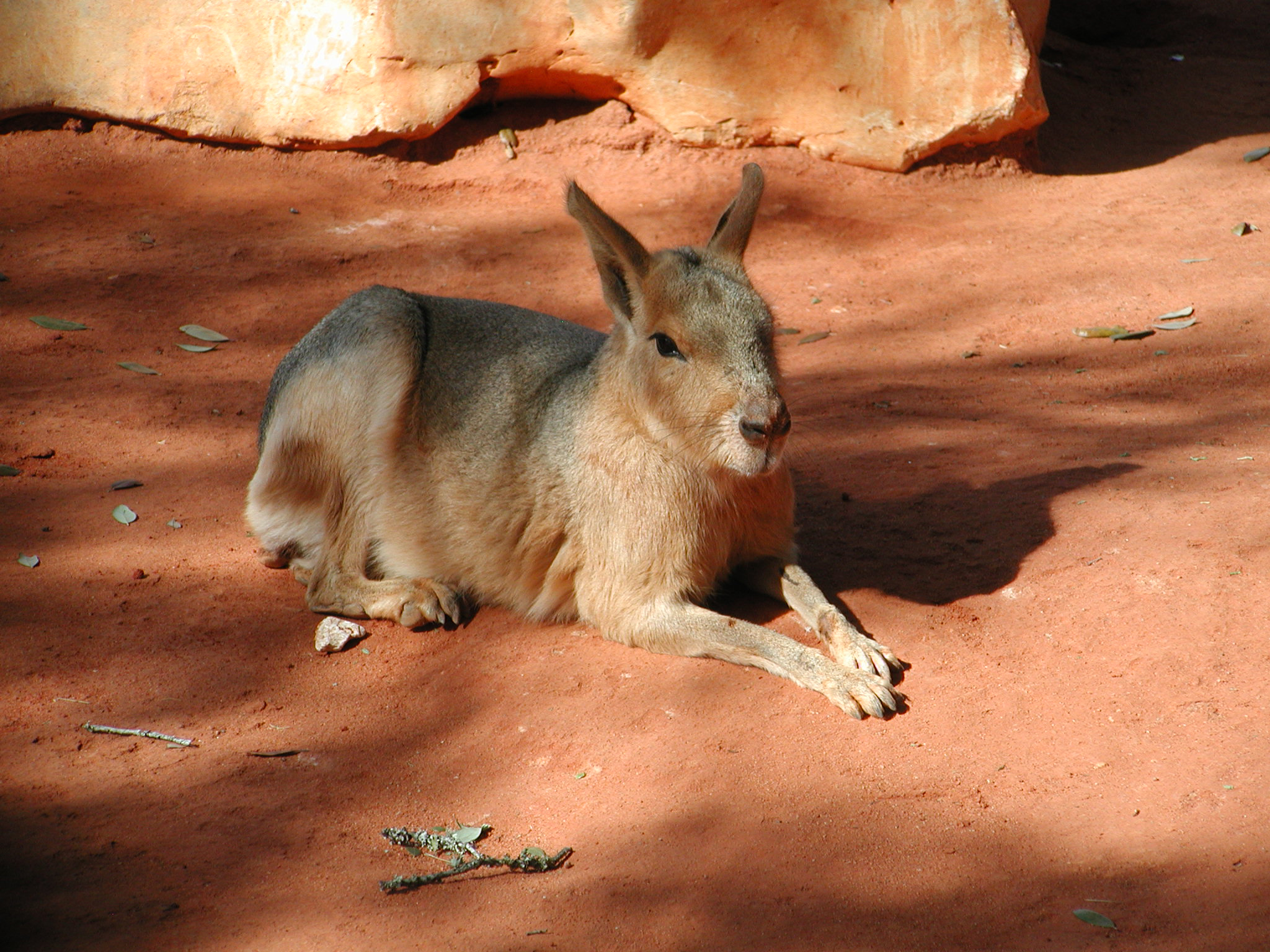
Patagonian mara at the Wildlife Ranch in San Antonio, Texas

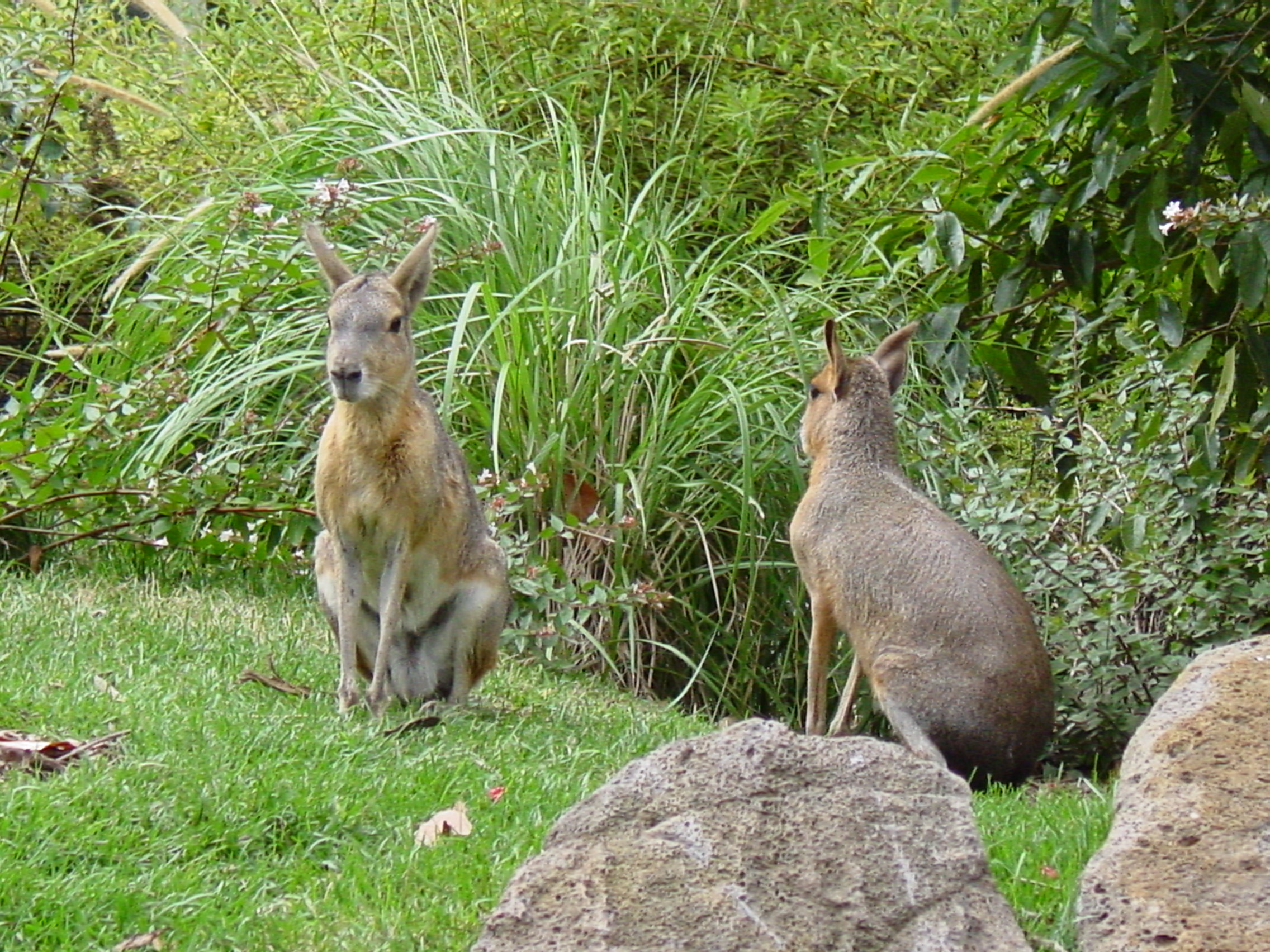
A pair of Patagonian maras at the Melbourne Zoo

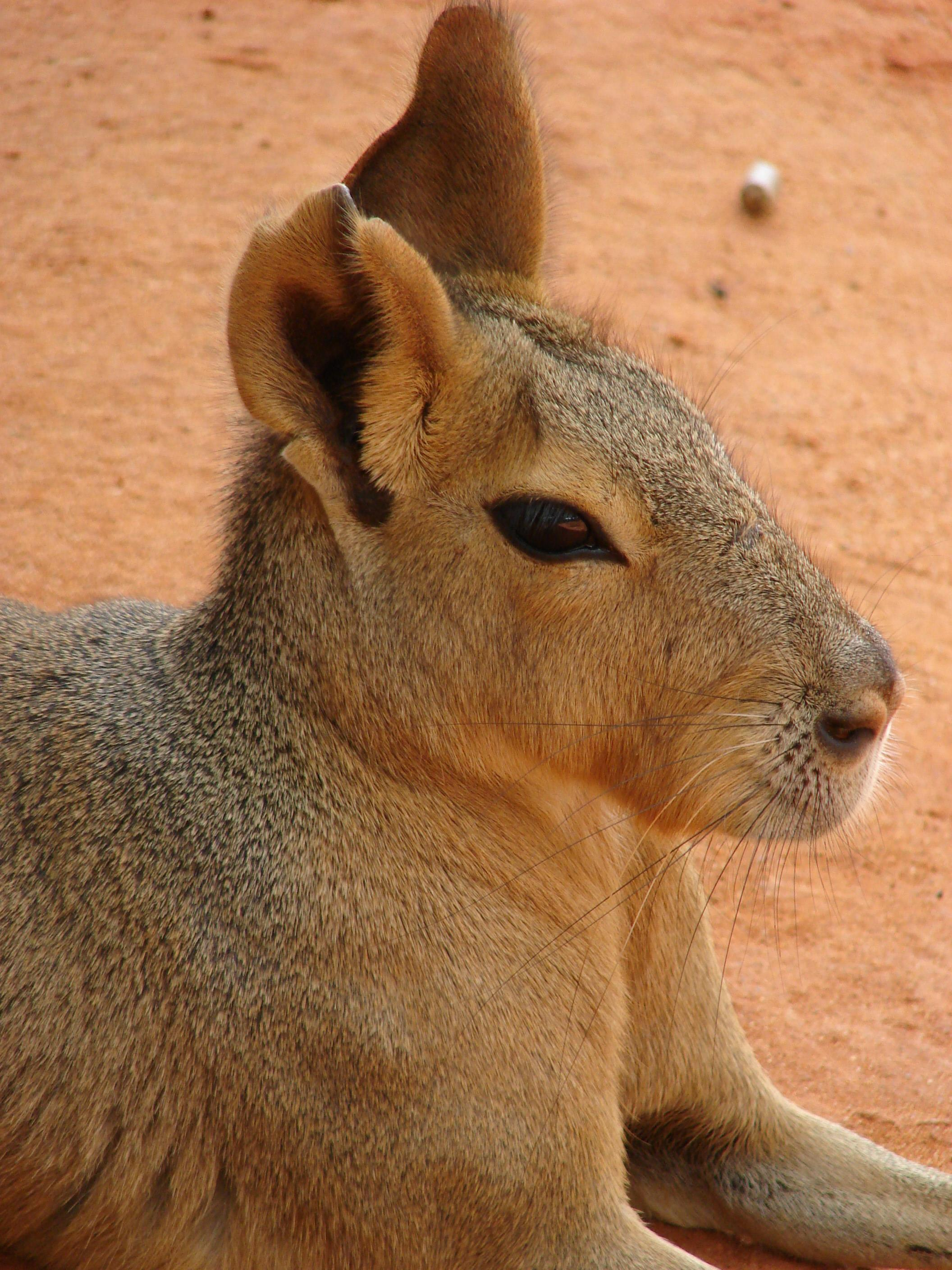
Close-up of a Patagonian mara

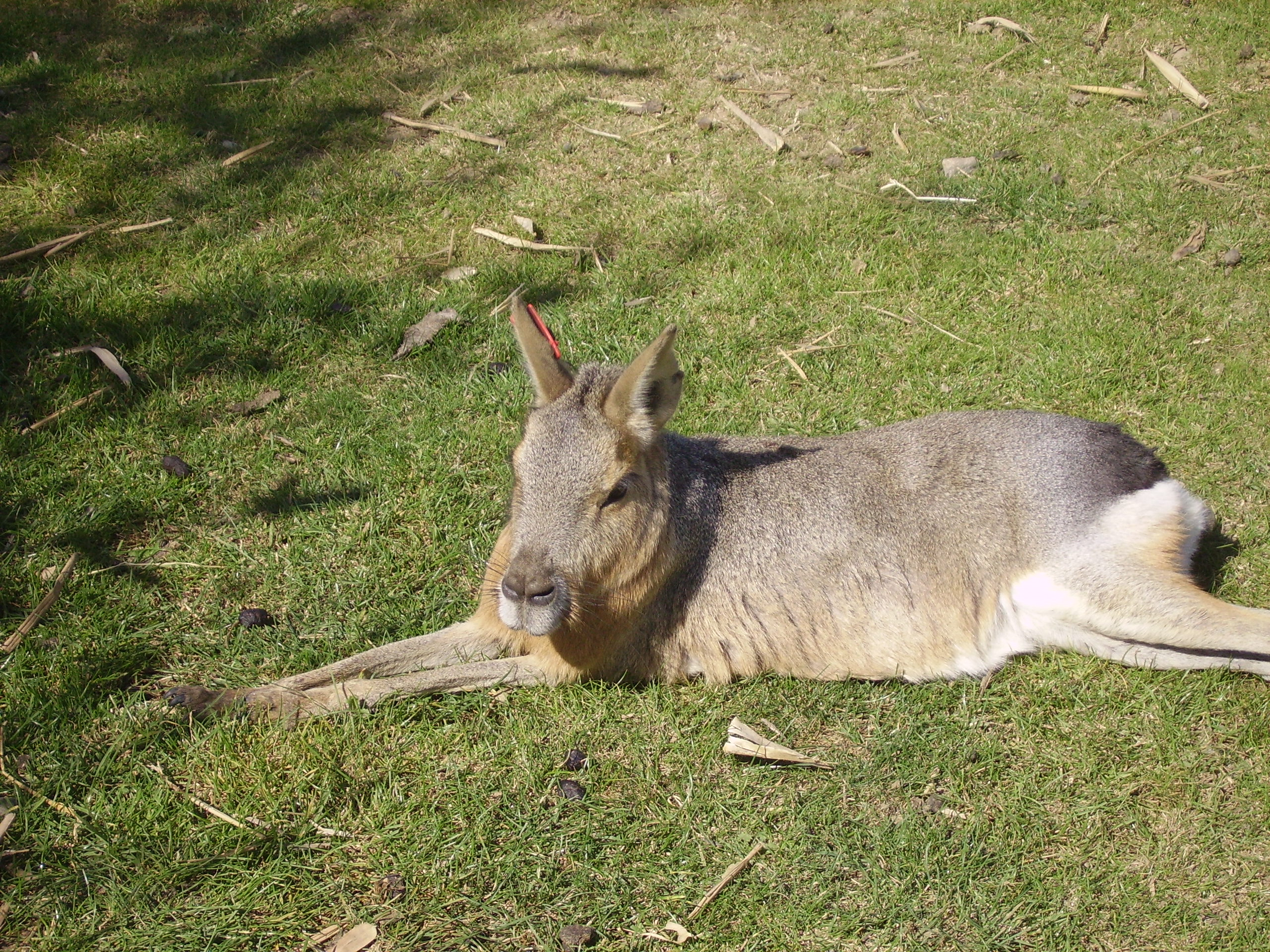
Mara at Tropical Wings
