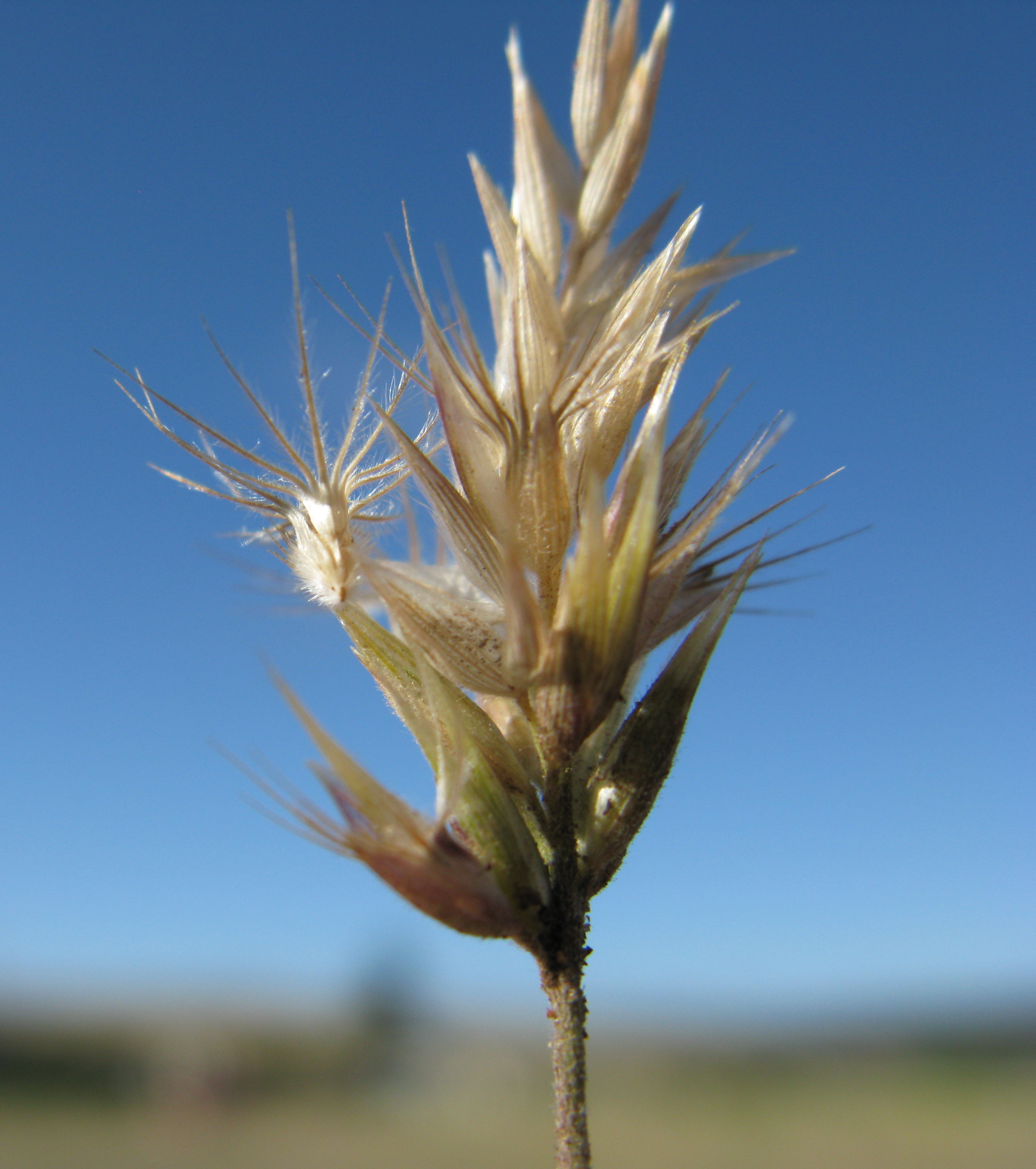

Scientific classification
- Kingdom: Plantae
- Clade: Embryophytes
- Clade: Tracheophytes
- Clade: Spermatophytes
- Clade: Angiosperms
- Clade: Monocots
- Clade: Commelinids
- Order: Poales
- Family: Poaceae
- Subfamily: Chloridoideae
- Genus: Enneapogon
- Species: E. nigricans

Binomial name
- Enneapogon nigricans (R.Br.) P.Beauv.

Synonyms
- Enneapogon flavescens (Lindl.) N.T.Burb.; Pappophorum flavescens Lindl.; P. nigricans R.Br. (basionym)

= Enneapogon nigricans =

Species of plant

Enneapogon nigricans, known by the common names blackheads, bottle washers, pappus grass, purpletop grass, and niggerheads, is a perennial Australian grass.

Distinctive lance-shaped seedheads appear in late spring and summer. They form at the top of wiry stalks over 30 cm long. They start as an olive green colour, but dry to a light brown. The seed itself is much like a parasol in appearance, and is around 5mm across. Germination is slow and unreliable and requires warm temperatures.

Leaves are smooth and of a bright, light green. Plants like sunny positions and generally grow in sunny, open mallee forests. Plants form tall dense tussocks to a maximum of only 20 cm across. They die down in late summer, before reshooting when the rains return.
