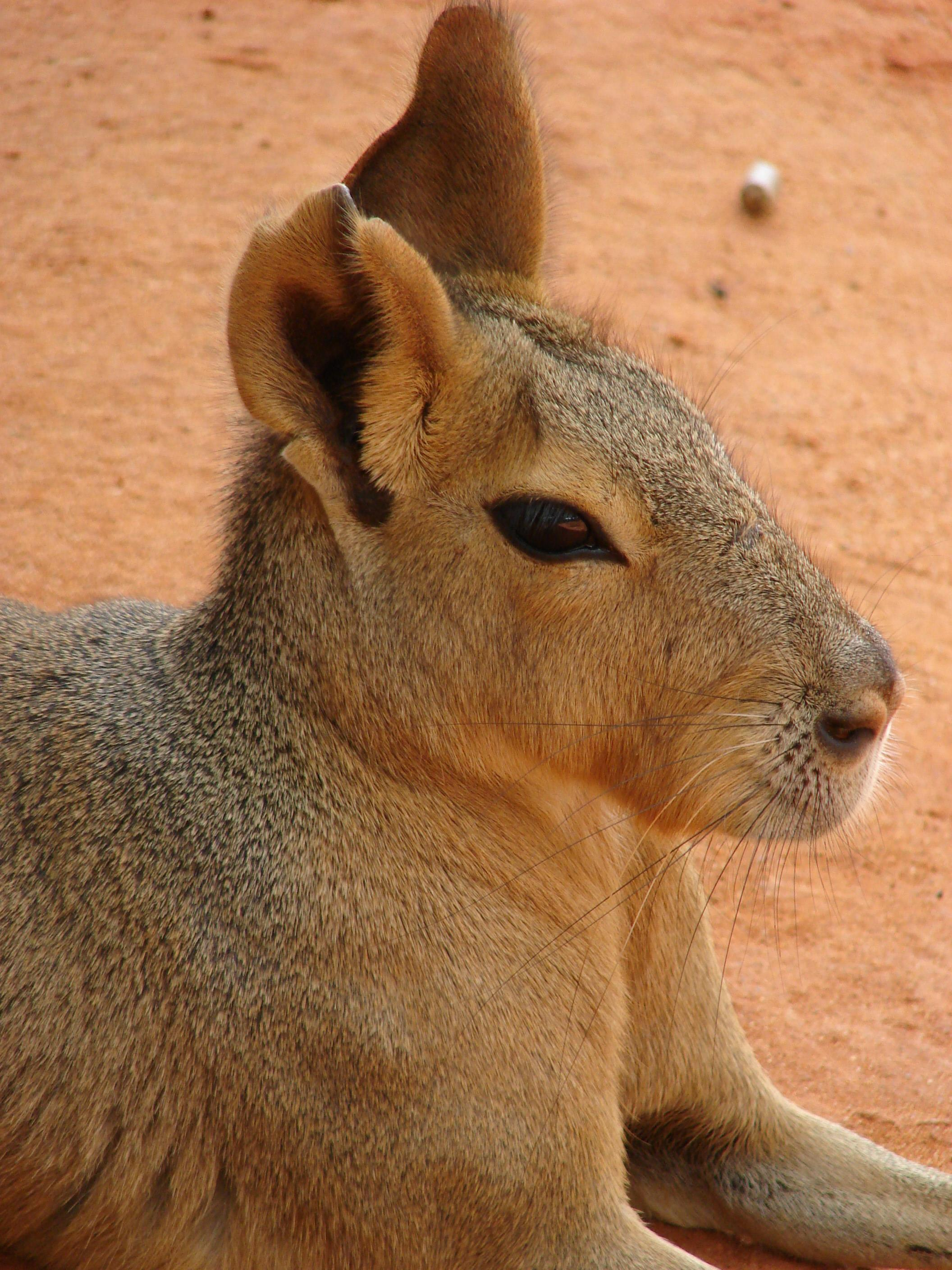
- Patagonian mara (Dolichotis patagonum)

Scientific classification
- Kingdom: Animalia
- Phylum: Chordata
- Class: Mammalia
- Infraclass: Placentalia
- Order: Rodentia
- Family: Caviidae
- Subfamily: Dolichotinae; Pocock, 1922

Genera
- See text
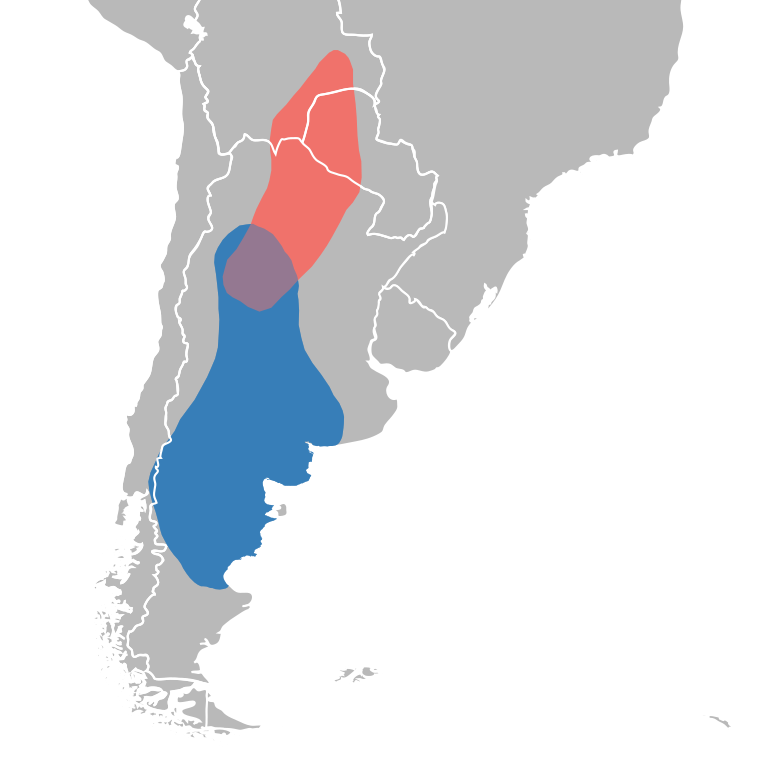
- Extant Dolichotinae distribution Dolichotis patagonum in blue, Dolichotis salinicola in red, purple where ranges overlap

= Mara (mammal) =

Dolichotinae Temporal range: Montehermosan-Recent ~6.8–0 Ma

Genus of rodents

Maras, subfamily Dolichotinae, are a group of rodents in the family Caviidae. These large relatives of guinea pigs are common in the Patagonian steppes of Argentina, but also live in Paraguay and elsewhere in South America. The two extant species are the Patagonian mara and the Chacoan mara. Traditionally, both species have been included in the genus Dolichotis, but a 2020 study by the American Society of Mammalogists found significant difference to warrant resurrecting the genus Pediolagus for the Chacoan mara. Several extinct genera are also known.

== Description ==
A mara feeding at Sunshine City, Tokyo

Maras have stocky bodies, three sharp-clawed digits on the hind feet, and four digits of the fore feet. They have been described as resembling long-legged rabbits; while standing, they can also resemble a small ungulate. Patagonian maras can run at speeds up to 29 km/h (18 mph). The Patagonian species can weigh over 11 kg (24 lb) in adulthood. The average weight of adult male Patagonian maras is 8.3 kg (18 lb) and in adult females is 7.75 kg (17.1 lb). Meanwhile, the Chacoan mara, though still large for a rodent, is much smaller, weighing around 1 to 3 kg (2.2 to 6.6 lb).

Most maras have brown heads and bodies, dark (almost black) rumps with a white fringe around the base, and white bellies.

Maras may amble, hop in a rabbit-like fashion, gallop, or bounce on all fours. They have been known to leap up to 6 ft (1.8 m).

Maras mate for life and may have from one to three offspring each year. Mara young are very well-developed and can start grazing within 24 hours. They use a crèche system, where one pair of adults keeps watch over all the young in the crèche. If they spot danger, the young rush below ground into a burrow, and the adults are left to run to escape.

== Genera ==
- Dolichotis
- †Eodolichotis
- †Pliodolichotis
- †Propediolagus
- †Rhodanodolichotis

== Interaction with humans ==
Patagonian maras are often kept in zoos or as pets and are also known as "Patagonian cavies" or "Patagonian hares". They can be quite social with humans if raised with human interaction from a young age, though they avoid people in the wild. Maras may even change their habits from coming out in day to becoming nocturnal, simply to avoid social interaction.

== Gallery ==
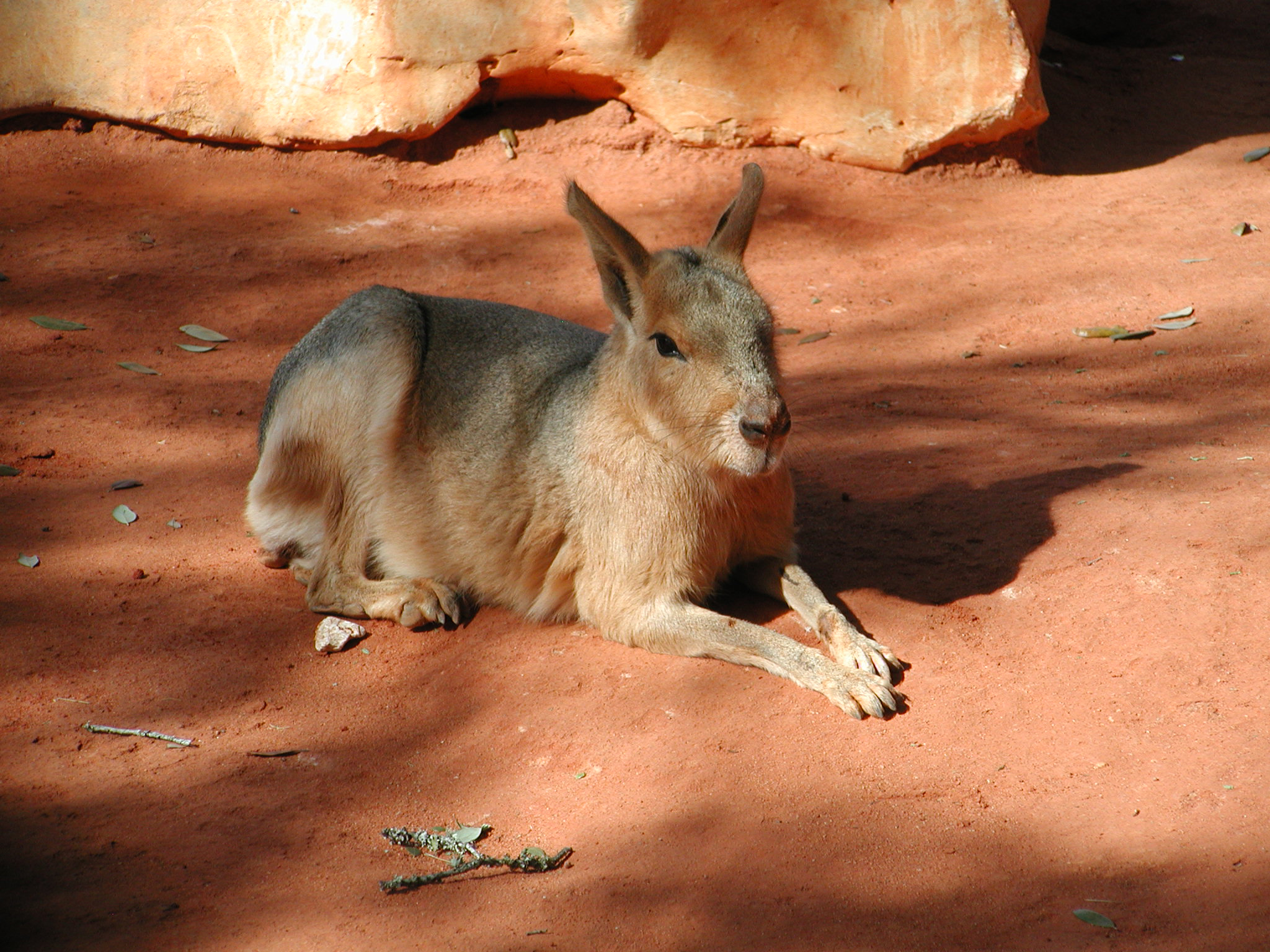
Patagonian mara at the Wildlife Ranch in San Antonio, Texas

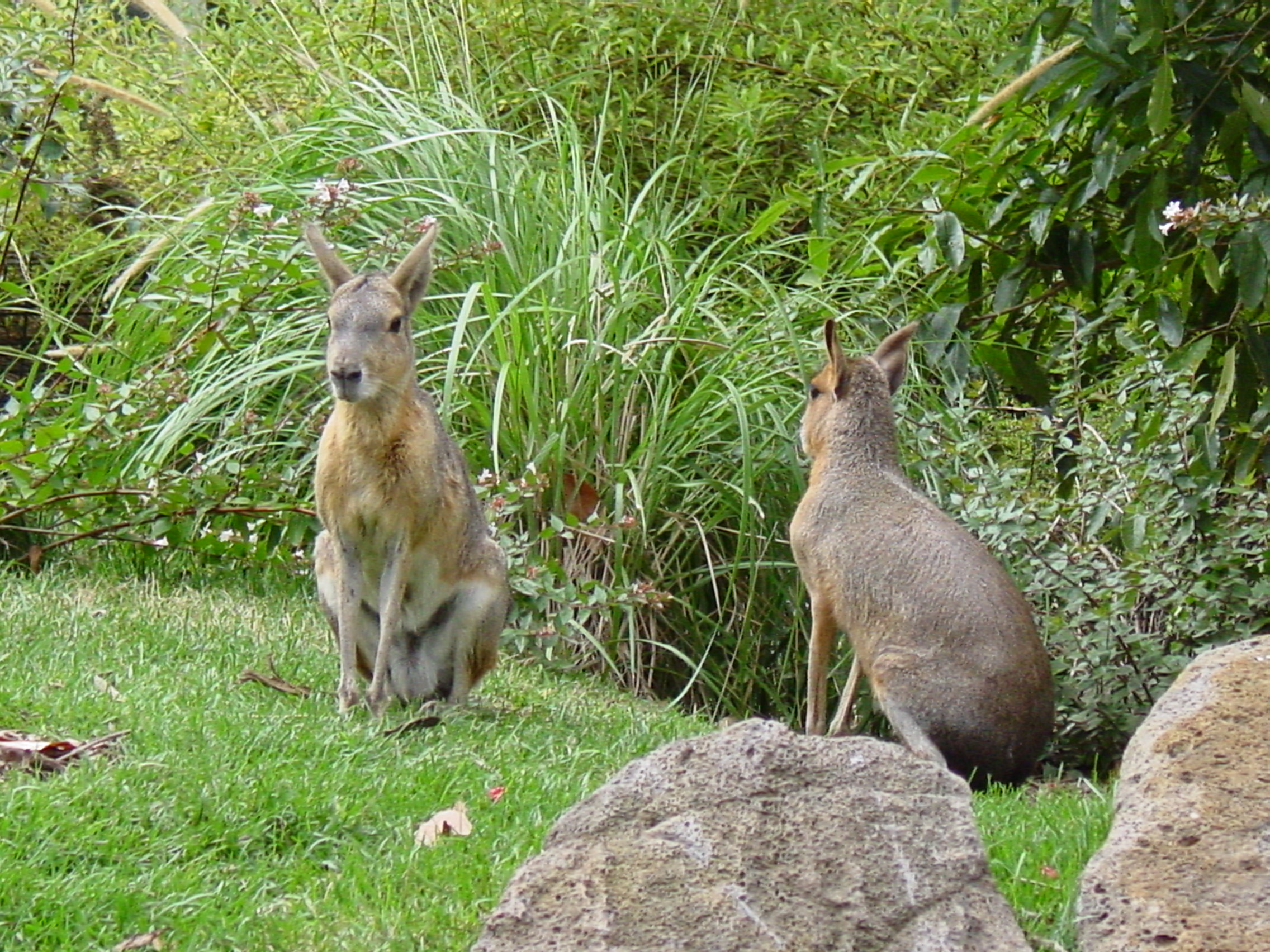
A pair of Patagonian maras at the Melbourne Zoo

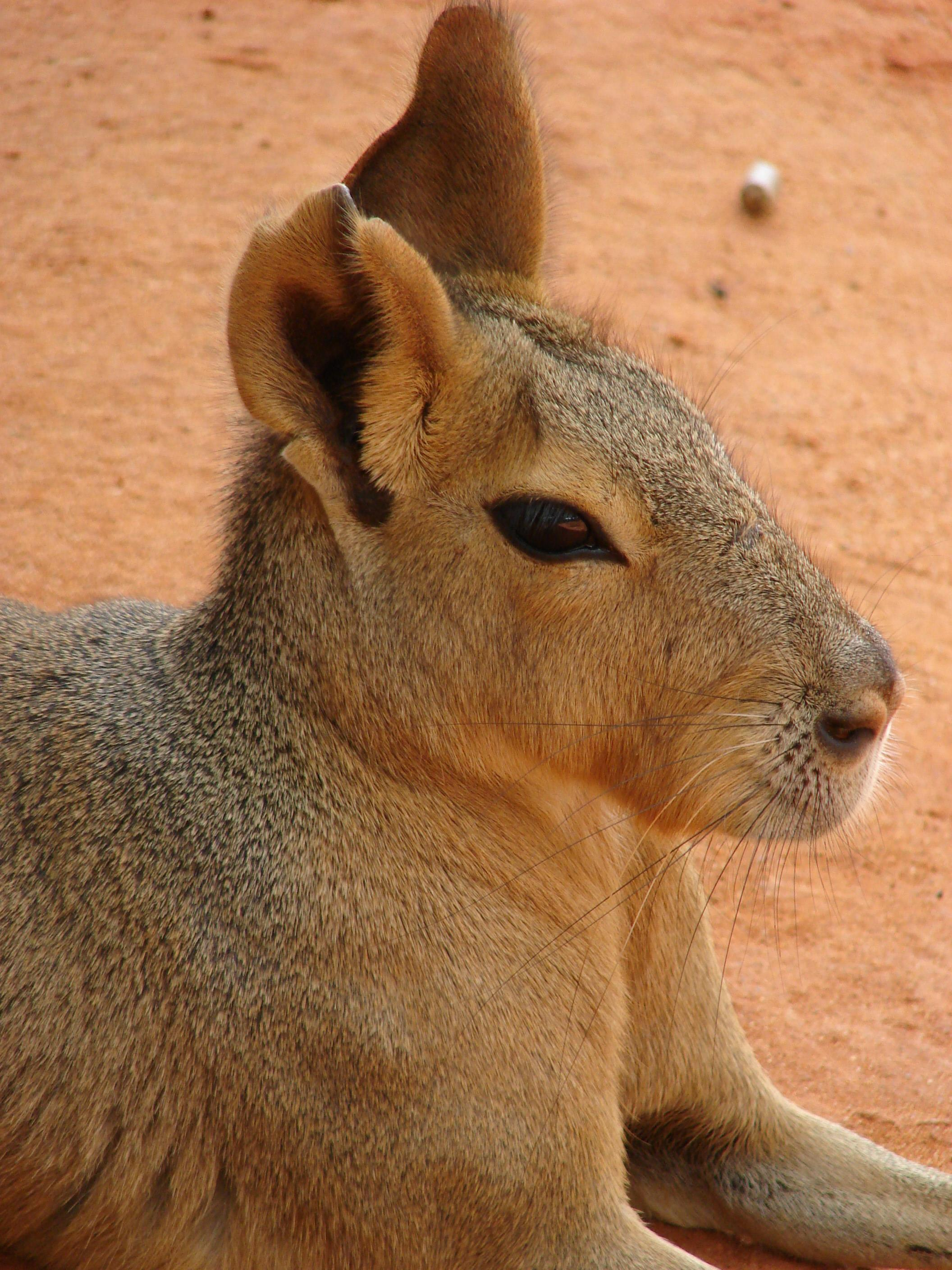
Close-up of a Patagonian mara

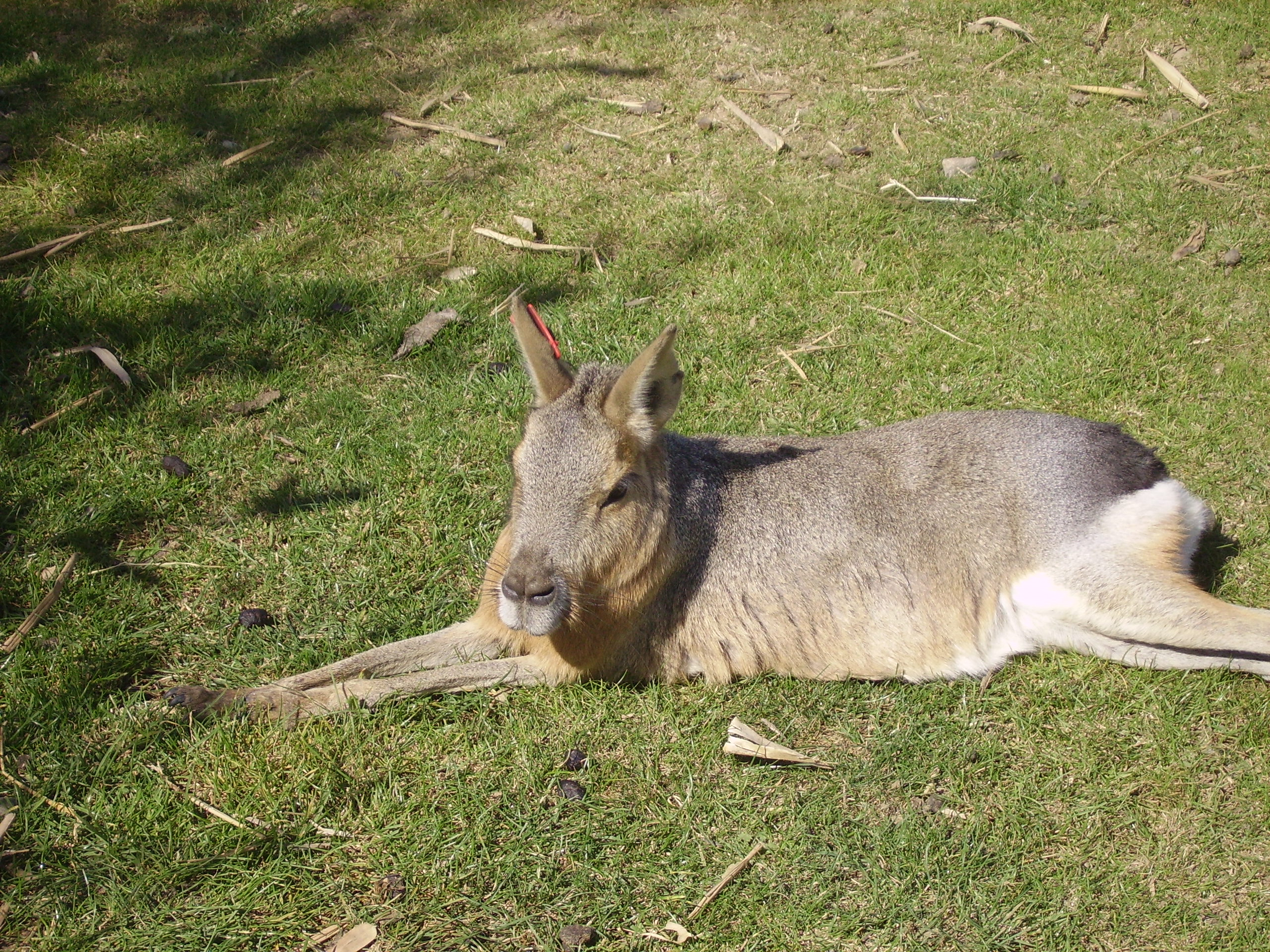
Mara at Tropical Wings
