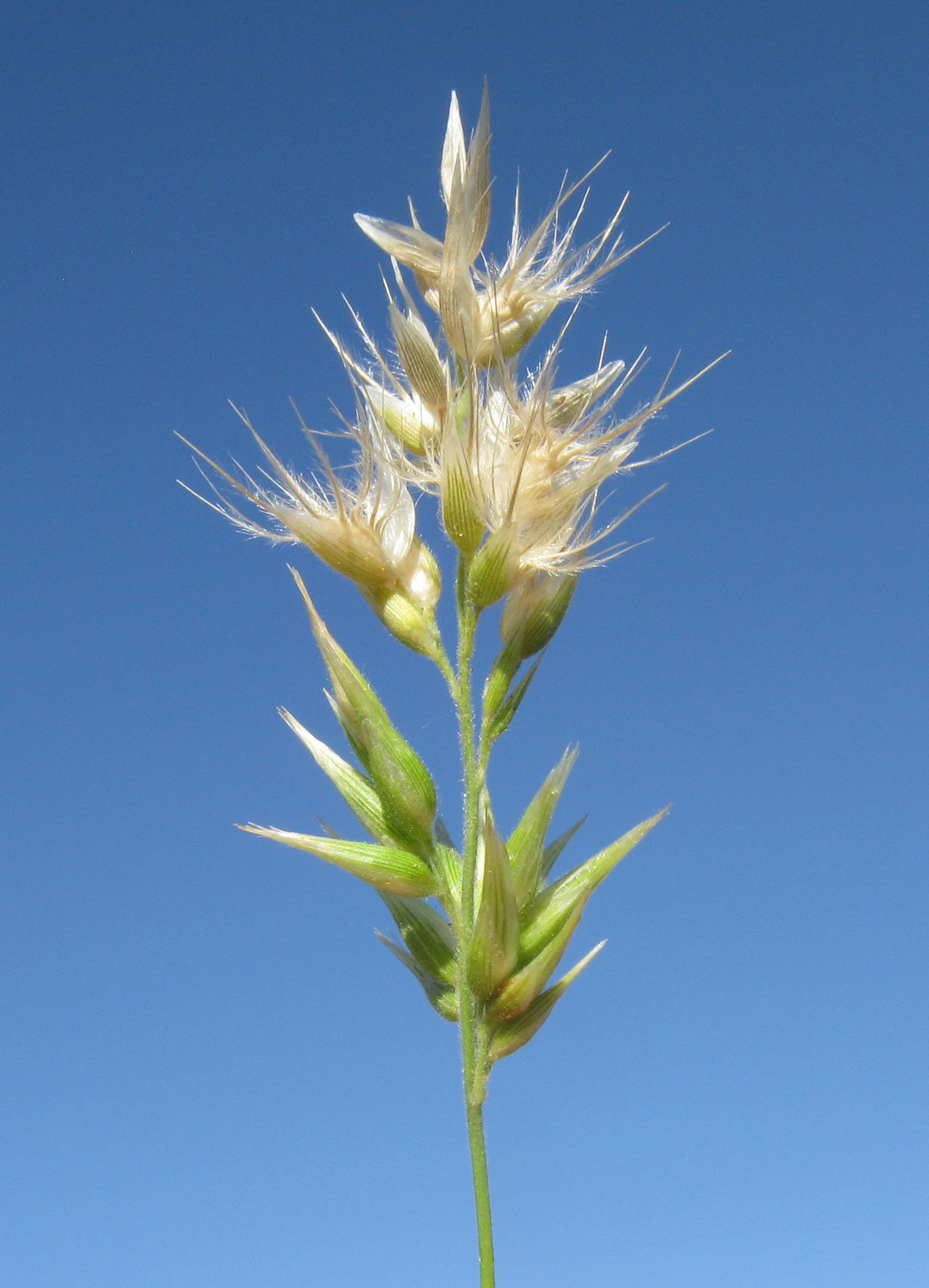

Scientific classification
- Kingdom: Plantae
- Clade: Tracheophytes
- Clade: Angiosperms
- Clade: Monocots
- Clade: Commelinids
- Order: Poales
- Family: Poaceae
- Subfamily: Chloridoideae
- Genus: Enneapogon
- Species: E. gracilis

Binomial name
- Enneapogon gracilis (R.Br.) P.Beauv.

= Enneapogon gracilis =

Species of grass

Enneapogon gracilis, or slender nineawn, is a species of grass found in Eastern Australia. It is also called slender bottlewashers.

== Distribution ==
Slender nineawn is common in inland New South Wales and Queensland, and is also found in Victoria and possibly the Northern Territory. It is most abundant in an inland belt from the western parts of the Great Dividing Range westwards to central New South Wales; in Queensland, its extent is somewhat narrower, for the most part sticking within 400 kilometres (250 mi) of the east coast, but its presence does extend as far as north as the Shire of Mareeba; in the state of Victoria, there are scattered records along the border with New South Wales, especially in and around Snowy River National Park. There are also isolated reports of slender nineawn from the Bass Coast, from the area of the Gregory River, and from the mid-northern inland Northern Territory.
