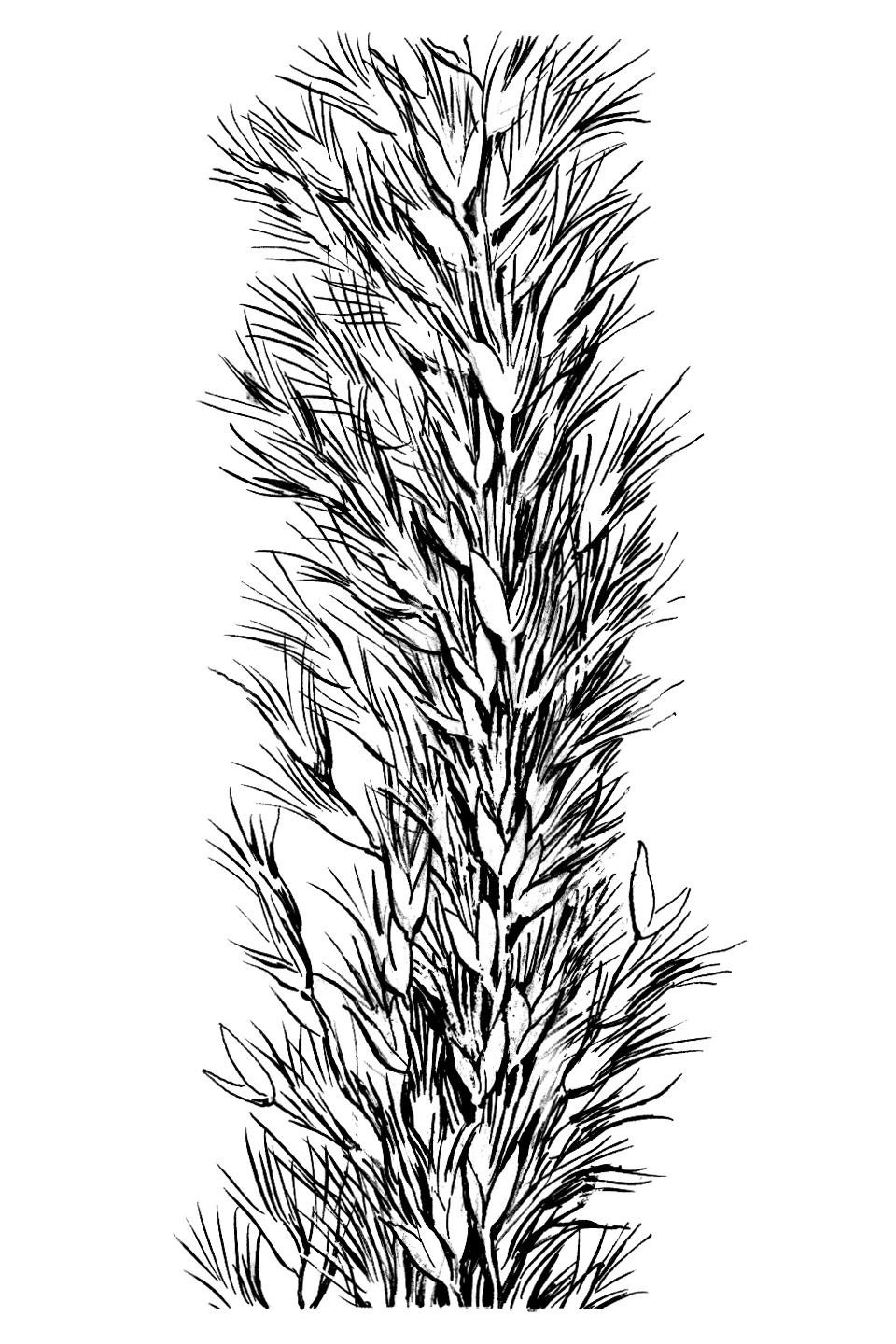
- Pappophorum bicolor

Conservation status
- Secure (NatureServe)

Scientific classification
- Kingdom: Plantae
- Clade: Tracheophytes
- Clade: Angiosperms
- Clade: Monocots
- Clade: Commelinids
- Order: Poales
- Family: Poaceae
- Subfamily: Chloridoideae
- Genus: Pappophorum
- Species: P. bicolor

Binomial name
- Pappophorum bicolor E.Fourn.

= Pappophorum bicolor =

Species of flowering plant

Pappophorum bicolor is a species of grass known by the common name pink pappusgrass.

== Distribution ==
The plant is bunchgrass endemic to North America, where it occurs in Northeastern Mexico and in Texas (United States). It is found in the Great Plains, other prairies, meadows, pastures, oak savannahs, and along roadsides.

== Description ==
This perennial bunchgrass grows up to 1 m (3 ft.) tall. The leaves are up to 20 or 30 centimeters long.

The narrow panicle is somewhat pink to purple in color. It blooms from April to November.

== Uses ==
Pink pappusgrass is used for the revegetation of rangeland, seeding along roadways, and for native habitat restoration. It is good for wildlife, and it provides a forage for livestock.

=== Cultivation ===
Pappophorum bicolor is cultivated as an ornamental grass, for use in traditional, native plant, and wildlife gardens.

The grass may be attacked by the rice stink bug (Oebalus pugnax).
