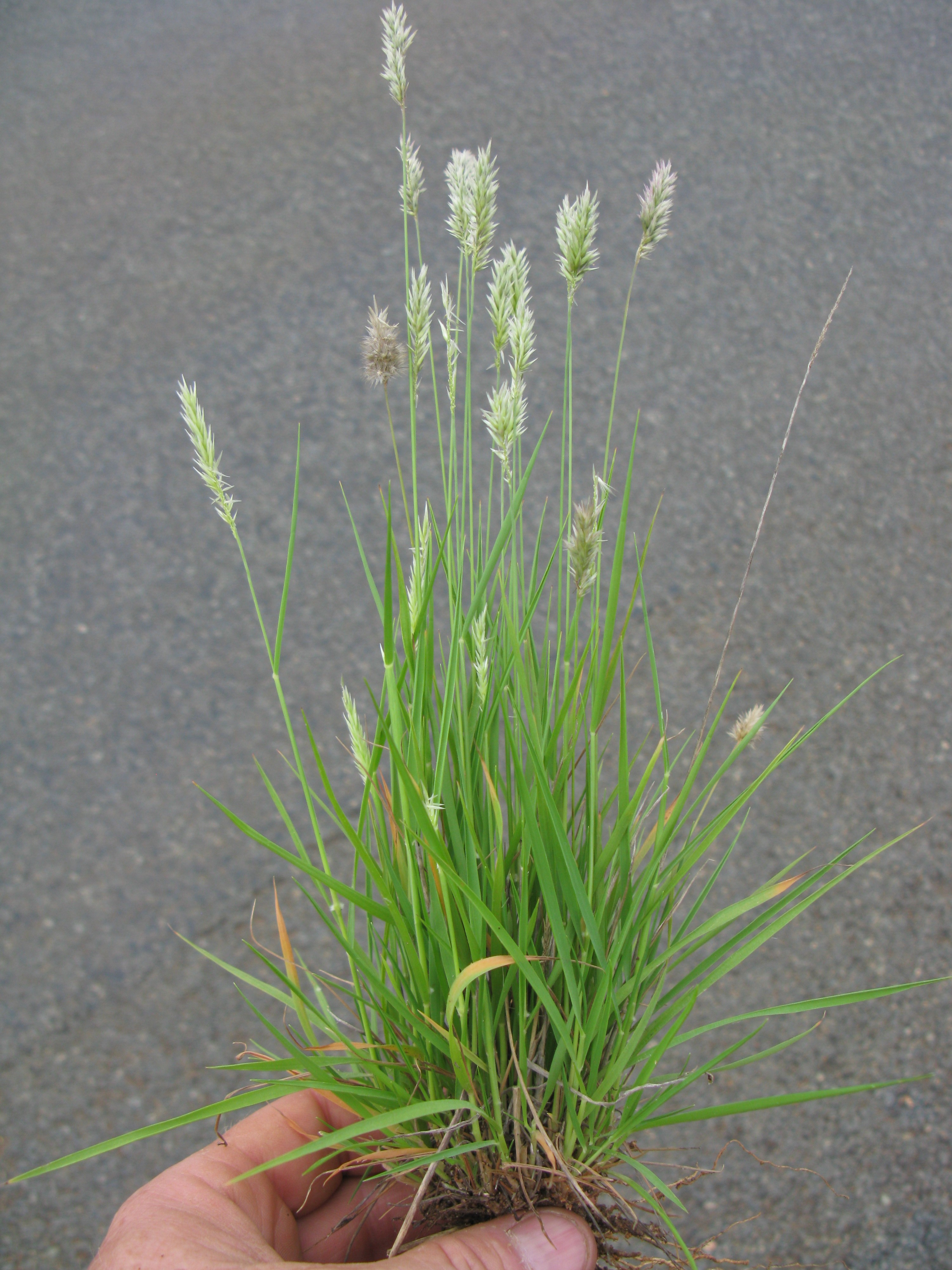
- Enneapogon nigricans

Scientific classification
- Kingdom: Plantae
- Clade: Tracheophytes
- Clade: Angiosperms
- Clade: Monocots
- Clade: Commelinids
- Order: Poales
- Family: Poaceae
- Subfamily: Chloridoideae
- Tribe: Eragrostideae
- Subtribe: Cotteinae
- Genus: Enneapogon; Desv. ex P.Beauv.

Type species
- Enneapogon desvauxii Desv. ex P.Beauv.

Synonyms
- Pappophorum sect. Enneapogon (Desv. ex P. Beauv.) Hack.; Pappophorum sect. Enneapogon (Desv. ex P. Beauv.) Trin.; Calotheria Wight & Arn. ex Steud.

= Enneapogon =

Genus of grasses

Enneapogon is a cosmopolitan genus of plants in the grass family.

They are also called bottle washers or pappus grass. These perennial grass species are found in tropical and warm temperate areas. They have small, narrow inflorescences.

Species

- Enneapogon asperatus - Queensland
- Enneapogon avenaceus - bottle-washers - Australia
- Enneapogon caerulescens - Australia
- Enneapogon cenchroides - Africa, Madagascar, Arabian Peninsula, Indian subcontinent
- Enneapogon cylindricus - jointed nineawn - Australia
- Enneapogon decipiens - Australia
- Enneapogon desvauxii - nineawn pappusgrass - Africa, temperate Asia, southwestern United States, Mexico, Bolivia, Peru, Chile, Argentina
- Enneapogon elegans - Burma, India
- Enneapogon eremophilus - Northern Territory, Queensland
- Enneapogon foxii - Israel
- Enneapogon gracilis - slender bottle-washers - Queensland, New South Wales
- Enneapogon intermedius - Australia
- Enneapogon lindleyanus - conetop nineawn - Australia
- Enneapogon nigricans - blackheads, niggerheads - Australia
- Enneapogon pallidus - Australia, New Guinea, Lesser Sunda Islands
- Enneapogon persicus - Xinjiang, Afghanistan, Jammu-Kashmir, Pakistan, Central Asia, Spain, Egypt, Algeria, tropical Africa, Middle East
- Enneapogon polyphyllus - leafy nineawn - Australia
- Enneapogon pretoriensis - Botswana to Free State, Limpopo, Mpumalanga
- Enneapogon purpurascens - Western Australia, Northern Territory
- Enneapogon robustissimus - Australia
- Enneapogon scaber - Saudi Arabia, drier parts of Africa
- Enneapogon scoparius - Yemen, Africa
- Enneapogon spathaceus - Limpopo
- Enneapogon truncatus - Queensland, New South Wales
- Enneapogon virens - Queensland, New South Wales
