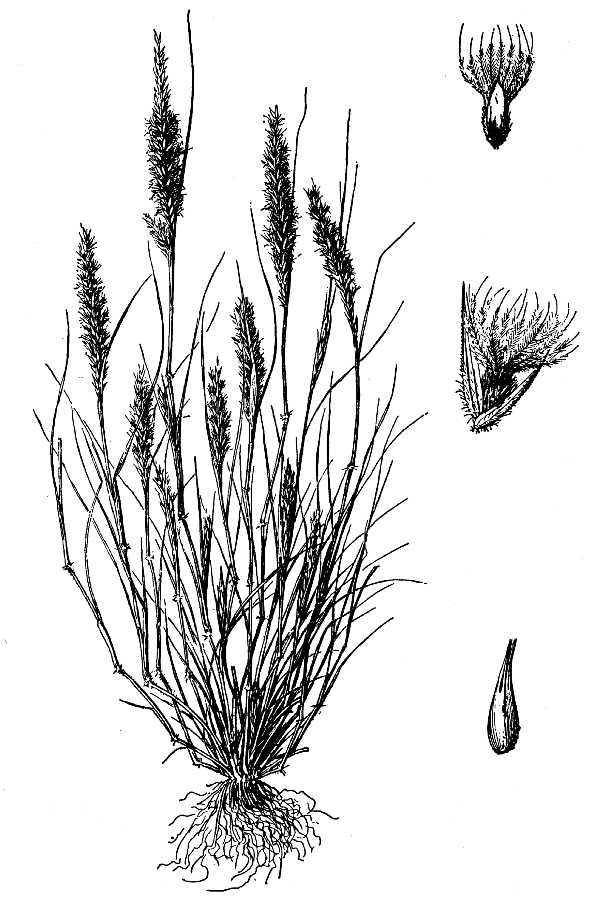

Conservation status
- Secure (NatureServe)

Scientific classification
- Kingdom: Plantae
- Clade: Tracheophytes
- Clade: Angiosperms
- Clade: Monocots
- Clade: Commelinids
- Order: Poales
- Family: Poaceae
- Subfamily: Chloridoideae
- Genus: Enneapogon
- Species: E. desvauxii

Binomial name
- Enneapogon desvauxii Desv. ex P.Beauv.

Synonyms
- Pappophorum wrightii Cottea sarmentosa

= Enneapogon desvauxii =

Species of flowering plant

Enneapogon desvauxii is a species of grass known by the common name nineawn pappusgrass. This is a short perennial bunchgrass native to the southwestern United States, northern Mexico, parts of South America, and occurs throughout arid parts of Africa. It is known less often on other continents.

== Description ==
Enneapogon desvauxi grows erect stems 10 to 40 centimetres (3.9 to 15.7 in) tall.

It has a few hairy, thready leaves and fluffy gray inflorescences. Each spike is 3 to 6 centimetres (1.2 to 2.4 in) long and contains fertile florets which form the fruit grain, each with nine spreading awns with white hairs.
