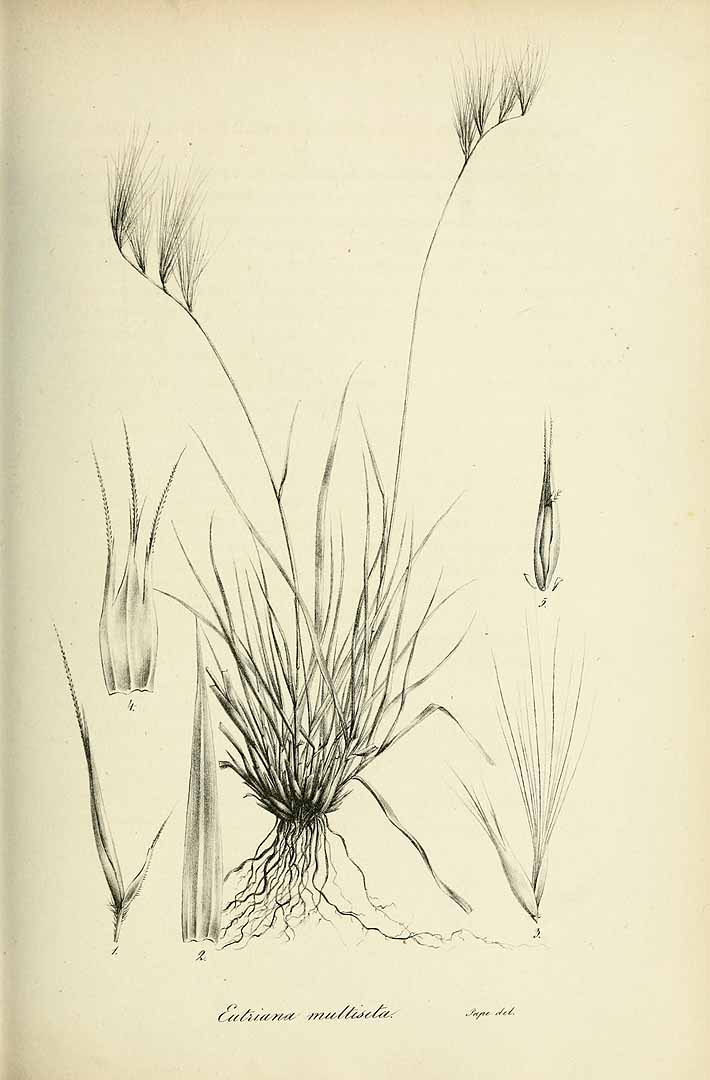
- Bouteloua megapotamica.

Scientific classification
- Kingdom: Plantae
- Clade: Tracheophytes
- Clade: Angiosperms
- Clade: Monocots
- Clade: Commelinids
- Order: Poales
- Family: Poaceae
- Subfamily: Chloridoideae
- Genus: Bouteloua
- Species: B. megapotamica

Binomial name
- Bouteloua megapotamica (Spreng.) Kuntze

Synonyms
- Pappophorum megapotamicum Spreng.; Bouteloua multiseta (Nees) Griseb.; Bouteloua multiseta var. pallida Hack.; Eutriana multiseta Nees; Pappophorum eutrianoides Trin. ex Nees [invalid]; Atheropogon multisetus (Nees) E.Fourn.

= Bouteloua megapotamica =

Species of grass

Bouteloua megapotamica is a species of grass in the genus Bouteloua, family Poaceae. It has a disjunct distribution in Mexico, Brazil, Uruguay, Bolivia, Paraguay and Argentina.
