= List of Sporobolus species =

The genus Sporobolus contains about 220 species.

- Sporobolus acinifolius Stapf
- Sporobolus actinocladus (F.Muell.) F.Muell.
- Sporobolus aculeatus (L.) P.M.Peterson
- Sporobolus acuminatus (Trin.) Hack.
- Sporobolus adustus (Trin.) Roseng., B.R.Arrill. & Izag.
- Sporobolus advenus (Stapf) P.M.Peterson
- Sporobolus aeneus (Trin.) Kunth
- Sporobolus africanus (Poir.) Robyns & Tournay
- Sporobolus agrostoides Chiov.
- Sporobolus airiformis Chiov.
- Sporobolus airoides (Torr.) Torr.
- Sporobolus albicans (Nees ex Trin.) Nees
- Sporobolus aldabrensis Renvoize
- Sporobolus alopecuroides (Piller & Mitterp.) P.M.Peterson
- Sporobolus alterniflorus (Loisel.) P.M.Peterson & Saarela
- Sporobolus amaliae Veldkamp
- Sporobolus anglicus (C.E.Hubb.) P.M.Peterson & Saarela
- Sporobolus angustifolius A.Rich.
- Sporobolus apiculatus Boechat & Longhi-Wagner
- Sporobolus arcuatus (K.E.Rogers) P.M.Peterson
- Sporobolus arenicola P.M.Peterson
- Sporobolus atrovirens (Kunth) Kunth
- Sporobolus australasicus Domin
- Sporobolus bahamensis Hack.
- Sporobolus bakeri (Merr.) P.M.Peterson & Saarela
- Sporobolus balansae Henrard
- Sporobolus bechuanicus Gooss.
- Sporobolus blakei B.K.Simon
- Sporobolus bogotensis Swallen & García-Barr.
- Sporobolus borszczowii (Regel) P.M.Peterson
- Sporobolus bosseri A.Camus
- Sporobolus brevipilis (Torr.) P.M.Peterson
- Sporobolus brockmanii Stapf
- Sporobolus buckleyi Vasey
- Sporobolus caespitosus Kunth
- Sporobolus camporum Swallen
- Sporobolus capillaris Miq.
- Sporobolus caroli Mez
- Sporobolus centrifugus (Trin.) Nees
- Sporobolus clandestinus (Biehler) Hitchc.
- Sporobolus coahuilensis J.Valdés
- Sporobolus coarctatus (Trin.) P.M.Peterson & Saarela
- Sporobolus collettii (Hook.f.) Bor
- Sporobolus compactus Clayton
- Sporobolus compositus (Poir.) Merr.
- Sporobolus confinis (Steud.) Chiov.
- Sporobolus congoensis Franch.
- Sporobolus consimilis Fresen.
- Sporobolus contiguus S.T.Blake
- Sporobolus contractus Hitchc.
- Sporobolus copei Verloove
- Sporobolus cordofanus (Hochst. ex Steud.) Hérincq ex Coss.
- Sporobolus coromandelianus (Retz.) Kunth
- Sporobolus creber De Nardi
- Sporobolus crucensis Renvoize
- Sporobolus cryptandrus (Torr.) A.Gray
- Sporobolus cubensis Hitchc.
- Sporobolus curtissii Small ex Kearney
- Sporobolus cynosuroides (L.) P.M.Peterson & Saarela
- Sporobolus diandrus (Retz.) P.Beauv.
- Sporobolus dinklagei Mez
- Sporobolus discosporus Nees
- Sporobolus disjunctus B.K.Simon
- Sporobolus distichivaginatus R.W.Pohl
- Sporobolus domingensis (Trin.) Kunth
- Sporobolus durus Brongn.
- Sporobolus × eatonianus P.M.Peterson & Saarela
- Sporobolus elatior Bosser
- Sporobolus elongatus R.Br.
- Sporobolus engleri Pilg.
- Sporobolus erectus Hitchc.
- Sporobolus eximius (Nees ex Trin.) Ekman
- Sporobolus factorovskyi (Eig) P.M.Peterson
- Sporobolus farinosus Hosok.
- Sporobolus fertilis (Steud.) Clayton
- Sporobolus festivus Hochst. ex A.Rich.
- Sporobolus fibrosus Cope
- Sporobolus fimbriatus (Nees ex Trin.) Nees
- Sporobolus flexuosus (Vasey) Rydb.
- Sporobolus floridanus Chapm.
- Sporobolus foliosus (Trin.) P.M.Peterson & Saarela
- Sporobolus fourcadei Stent
- Sporobolus geminatus Clayton
- Sporobolus giganteus Nash
- Sporobolus gloeoclados Cope
- Sporobolus hadjikyriakou (Raus & H.Scholz) P.M.Peterson
- Sporobolus hajrae P.Umam. & P.Daniel
- Sporobolus halophilus Bosser
- Sporobolus hancei Rendle
- Sporobolus harmandii Henrard
- Sporobolus helvolus (Trin.) T.Durand & Schinz
- Sporobolus heterolepis (A.Gray) A.Gray
- Sporobolus hians Van Schaack
- Sporobolus hintonii W.Hartley
- Sporobolus hookerianus P.M.Peterson & Saarela
- Sporobolus humilis J.Presl
- Sporobolus indicus (L.) R.Br.
- Sporobolus infirmus Mez
- Sporobolus interruptus Vasey
- Sporobolus ioclados (Nees ex Trin.) Nees
- Sporobolus ivakoanyensis A.Camus
- Sporobolus junceus (P.Beauv.) Kunth
- Sporobolus kerrii Bor
- Sporobolus lanuginellus Maire
- Sporobolus lasiophyllus Pilg.
- Sporobolus latzii B.K.Simon
- Sporobolus laxus B.K.Simon
- Sporobolus lenticularis S.T.Blake
- Sporobolus linearifolius Nicora
- Sporobolus linearis Mez
- Sporobolus longispicus (Hauman & Parodi ex St.-Yves) P.M.Peterson & Saarela
- Sporobolus ludwigii Hochst.
- Sporobolus macer (Trin.) Hitchc.
- Sporobolus macranthelus Chiov.
- Sporobolus macrospermus Scribn. ex Beal
- Sporobolus maderaspatanus Bor
- Sporobolus maritimus (Curtis) P.M.Peterson & Saarela
- Sporobolus maximus Hauman
- Sporobolus megalospermus (F.Muell. ex Benth.) P.M.Peterson
- Sporobolus mendocinus Méndez
- Sporobolus metallicola Longhi-Wagner & Boechat
- Sporobolus michauxianus (Hitchc.) P.M.Peterson & Saarela
- Sporobolus micranthus (Steud.) T.Durand & Schinz
- Sporobolus microprotus Stapf
- Sporobolus mildbraedii Pilg.
- Sporobolus minarum Boechat & Longhi-Wagner
- Sporobolus minimus Cope
- Sporobolus minor Kunth
- Sporobolus minuartioides (Bornm.) P.M.Peterson
- Sporobolus minutus Link
- Sporobolus mirabilis Pilg.
- Sporobolus mitchellii (Trin.) C.E.Hubb.
- Sporobolus mobberleyanus P.M.Peterson & Saarela
- Sporobolus molleri Hack.
- Sporobolus monandrus Roseng., B.R.Arrill. & Izag.
- Sporobolus montanus Engl.
- Sporobolus montevidensis (Arechav.) P.M.Peterson & Saarela
- Sporobolus mopane Cope
- Sporobolus multinodis Hack.
- Sporobolus multiramosus Longhi-Wagner & Boechat
- Sporobolus myrianthus Benth.
- Sporobolus natalensis (Steud.) T.Durand & Schinz
- Sporobolus nealleyi Vasey
- Sporobolus nebulosus Hack.
- Sporobolus neglectus Nash
- Sporobolus nervosus Hochst.
- Sporobolus nesiotioides Longhi-Wagner, R.J.V.Alves & N.G.Silva
- Sporobolus niliacus (Fig. & De Not.) P.M.Peterson
- Sporobolus nitens Stent
- Sporobolus novoguineensis Baaijens
- Sporobolus nudiramus Boechat & Longhi-Wagner
- Sporobolus olivaceus Napper
- Sporobolus osceolensis E.L.Bridges & Orzell
- Sporobolus oxyphyllus Fish
- Sporobolus palmeri Scribn.
- Sporobolus pamelae B.K.Simon
- Sporobolus panicoides A.Rich.
- Sporobolus paniculatus (Trin.) T.Durand & Schinz
- Sporobolus partimpatens B.K.Simon
- Sporobolus pauciflorus A.Chev.
- Sporobolus paucifolius Boechat & Longhi-Wagner
- Sporobolus pectinatus Hack.
- Sporobolus pectinellus Mez
- Sporobolus pellucidus Hochst.
- Sporobolus perrieri A.Camus
- Sporobolus phleoides Hack. ex Stuck.
- Sporobolus piliferus (Trin.) Kunth
- Sporobolus pinetorum Weakley & P.M.Peterson
- Sporobolus platensis Parodi
- Sporobolus potosiensis Wipff & S.D.Jones
- Sporobolus pseudairoides Parodi
- Sporobolus pulchellus R.Br.
- Sporobolus pumilus (Roth) P.M.Peterson & Saarela
- Sporobolus pungens (Schreb.) Kunth
- Sporobolus purpurascens (Sw.) Ham.
- Sporobolus pyramidalis P.Beauv.
- Sporobolus pyramidatus (Lam.) Hitchc.
- Sporobolus quadratus Clayton
- Sporobolus ramigerus (F.Muell.) R.L.Barrett & P.M.Peterson
- Sporobolus recurvatus Boechat & Longhi-Wagner
- Sporobolus reflexus Boechat & Longhi-Wagner
- Sporobolus rhizomatosus (Steud.) T.Durand & Schinz
- Sporobolus rigens (Trin.) É.Desv.
- Sporobolus rigidifolius (Trin.) Mez ex Veldkamp
- Sporobolus rigidus (Buckley) P.M.Peterson
- Sporobolus robustus Kunth
- Sporobolus ruspolianus Chiov.
- Sporobolus salsus Mez
- Sporobolus sanguineus Rendle
- Sporobolus scabridus S.T.Blake
- Sporobolus schoenoides (L.) P.M.Peterson
- Sporobolus sciadocladus Ohwi
- Sporobolus scitulus Clayton
- Sporobolus sessilis B.K.Simon
- Sporobolus silveanus Swallen
- Sporobolus somalensis Chiov.
- Sporobolus spartinae (Trin.) P.M.Peterson & Saarela
- Sporobolus spicatus (Vahl) Kunth
- Sporobolus spiciformis Swallen
- Sporobolus splendens Swallen
- Sporobolus stapfianus Gand.
- Sporobolus stolzii Mez
- Sporobolus subglobosus A.Chev.
- Sporobolus subtilis Kunth
- Sporobolus subulatus Hack.
- Sporobolus temomairemensis Judz. & P.M.Peterson
- Sporobolus tenellus (A.Spreng.) Kunth
- Sporobolus tenuissimus (Mart. ex Schrank) Kuntze
- Sporobolus teretifolius R.M.Harper
- Sporobolus testudinum Renvoize
- Sporobolus tetragonus Bor
- Sporobolus texanus Vasey
- Sporobolus tourneuxii Coss.
- Sporobolus × townsendii (H.Groves & J.Groves) P.M.Peterson & Saarela
- Sporobolus trichodes Hitchc.
- Sporobolus tsiafajavonensis A.Camus
- Sporobolus turkestanicus (Eig) P.M.Peterson
- Sporobolus uniglumis Stent & J.M.Rattray
- Sporobolus vaginiflorus (Torr. ex A.Gray) Alph.Wood
- Sporobolus vaseyi P.M.Peterson
- Sporobolus versicolor (E.Fabre) P.M.Peterson & Saarela
- Sporobolus virginicus (L.) Kunth
- Sporobolus viscidus Sohns
- Sporobolus wallichii Munro ex Thwaites
- Sporobolus welwitschii Rendle
- Sporobolus wrightii Scribn.
