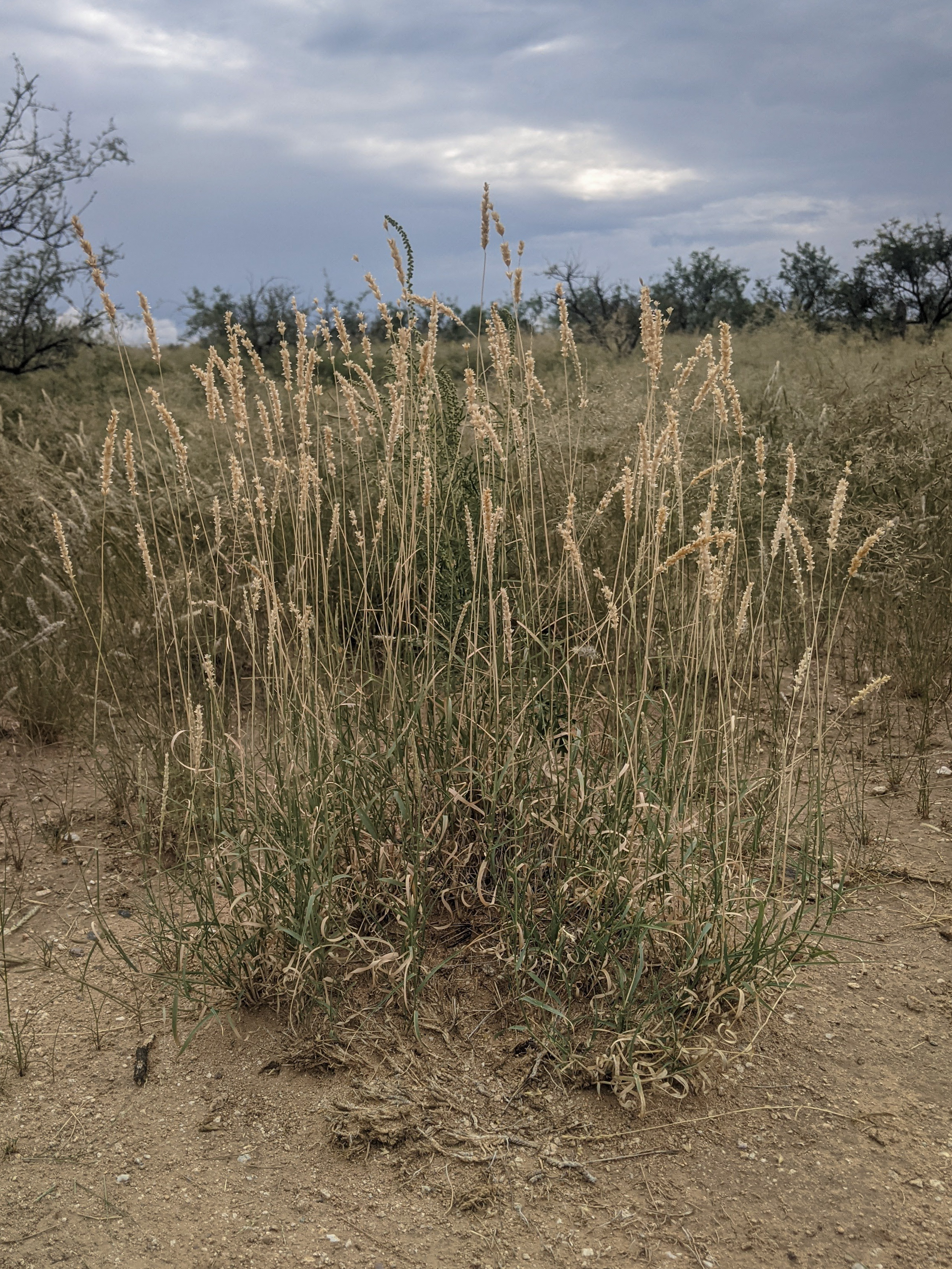

Conservation status
- Secure (NatureServe)

Scientific classification
- Kingdom: Plantae
- Clade: Tracheophytes
- Clade: Angiosperms
- Clade: Monocots
- Clade: Commelinids
- Order: Poales
- Family: Poaceae
- Subfamily: Chloridoideae
- Genus: Hilaria
- Species: H. mutica

Binomial name
- Hilaria mutica (Buckley) Benth.

Synonyms
- Pleuraphis mutica Buckley

= Hilaria mutica =

Grass species

Hilaria mutica, synonym Pleuraphis mutica, is a species of grass known by the common name tobosa, or tobosa grass. It is native to Northern Mexico, and the Southwestern United States, in Arizona, New Mexico, Oklahoma, and Texas.

== Description ==
Hilaria mutica is perennial grass that is rhizomatous and forms sod. It usually grows 30 to 60 cm (0.98 to 1.97 ft) tall, sometimes reaching up to 90 cm (3.0 ft). The stems have decumbent bases and erect tops.

Most of the stiff, hairless leaves are basal. They are up to 15 cm (5.9 in) long. The bases of the stems come from a thick, woody rootstock and a system of roots that penetrates up to 1.8 m (5.9 ft) deep in the soil.

The inflorescence is a few centimeters long and is white, straw, or purplish. Spikelets are borne in clusters of three. The plant reproduces mainly by spreading by its rhizome, and does not often form viable seeds. The plant is susceptible to ergot.

== Distribution ==
Hilaria mutica is one of the most common species on the semidesert grasslands in the region. It is a climax species on frequently flooded lowlands. It also occurs on upland territory. Habitat types that feature the grass include pinyon-juniper woodland and mesquite, creosote, and grassy shrubsteppe. It does best on land that is flooded for a few days and then dries up. It also grows on drier soils, and it is somewhat drought-tolerant.

It grows on clay with honey mesquite and other species such as burrograss (Scleropogon brevifolius), alkali sacaton (Sporobolus airoides) and sacaton (S. wrightii) and other dropseed grasses (Sporobolus spp.), grama grasses (Bouteloua spp.), muhly grasses (Muhlenbergia spp.), and tarbush (Flourensia cernua).

== Uses ==
Tobosa is an important forage for cattle and horses in the American Southwest. It is productive and palatable until it becomes rough at maturity. It is especially valuable during drought when it persists after other grasses die. It can be cut into hay when still green. In Texas, it yields 1000 pounds per acre, and this can be increased with careful and deliberate management. In areas with adequate precipitation, burning is used to remove litter, which then stimulates the stems to produce more green matter.

The grass can cause ergot poisoning if eaten when infested with the fungus.
