= Rough dropseed =

Rough dropseed is a common name for several plants and may refer to:

- Sporobolus clandestinus
- Sporobolus compositus (syn. Sporobolus asper)
