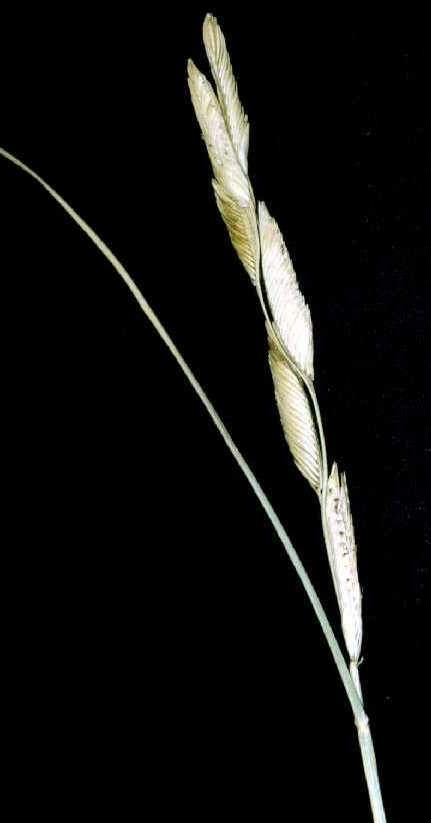

Scientific classification
- Kingdom: Plantae
- Clade: Tracheophytes
- Clade: Angiosperms
- Clade: Monocots
- Clade: Commelinids
- Order: Poales
- Family: Poaceae
- Subfamily: Chloridoideae
- Genus: Sporobolus
- Section: Spartina
- Species: S. hookerianus

Binomial name
- Sporobolus hookerianus P.M.Peterson & Saarela

Synonyms
- Spartina gracilis Trin.

= Sporobolus hookerianus =

Species of plant

Sporobolus hookerianus is a species of grass known by the common name alkali cordgrass.

== Distribution ==
It is native to western North America from north-western Canada through the western United States and eastern California, and into central Mexico. It grows in moist alkaline habitat, such as evaporating streams and shorelines, alkali flats, and inland marshes.

== Description ==
It is a perennial grass growing from elongated, slender rhizomes measuring 3-5 millimeters wide. It typically produces solitary, erect, slender culms that range from 1.8 to 10 decimeters tall, with firm internodes and the stem bases 2-5 millimeters wide. The leaves are flat and ridged, with blades 15-27 centimeters long and 2.5-6 millimeters wide at the base; they are often inrolled when fresh and bear approximately five ridges per millimeter on the upper surface.

The inflorescence is a narrow, dense, spike-like panicle measuring 4-25 centimeters in length and 5-12 millimeters in width. Its 2-12 branches are usually appressed and overlapping for about half their length, only rarely separate at the lowest node. Spikelets are 6-11 millimeters long. Lemmas measure 6.5-10 millimeters and have keels that are ciliate at least near the tip, with hairs on the glumes and lemmas generally 0.3-1 millimeter long. The lower glume is 3-7 millimeters long and the upper glume is 5-11 millimeters long. The chromosome number is reported as 2n = 40 or 42. Flowering occurs from June through August.

== Taxonomy ==
Sporobolus hookerianus was previously known as Spartina gracilis Trin. Molecular phylogenetic analysis based on plastid and nuclear DNA regions demonstrated that the genus Spartina is nested within Sporobolus, making Sporobolus paraphyletic if Spartina were retained as a separate genus. Sporobolus hookerianus was established as a new name in 2014 by P.M. Peterson and Saarela.
