= Sporobolus neglectus =

Scientific classification
- Kingdom: Plantae
- Clade: Tracheophytes
- Clade: Angiosperms
- Clade: Monocots
- Clade: Commelinids
- Order: Poales
- Family: Poaceae
- Subfamily: Chloridoideae
- Genus: Sporobolus
- Species: S. neglectus

Binomial name
- Sporobolus neglectus Nash

Species of grass

Sporobolus neglectus, common names small dropseed, small rushgrass, and puffsheath dropseed, is a plant found in North America. It is listed as endangered in Connecticut, Massachusetts, New Hampshire and New Jersey. It is listed is as endangered and extirpated in Maryland and as possibly extirpated in Maine.
