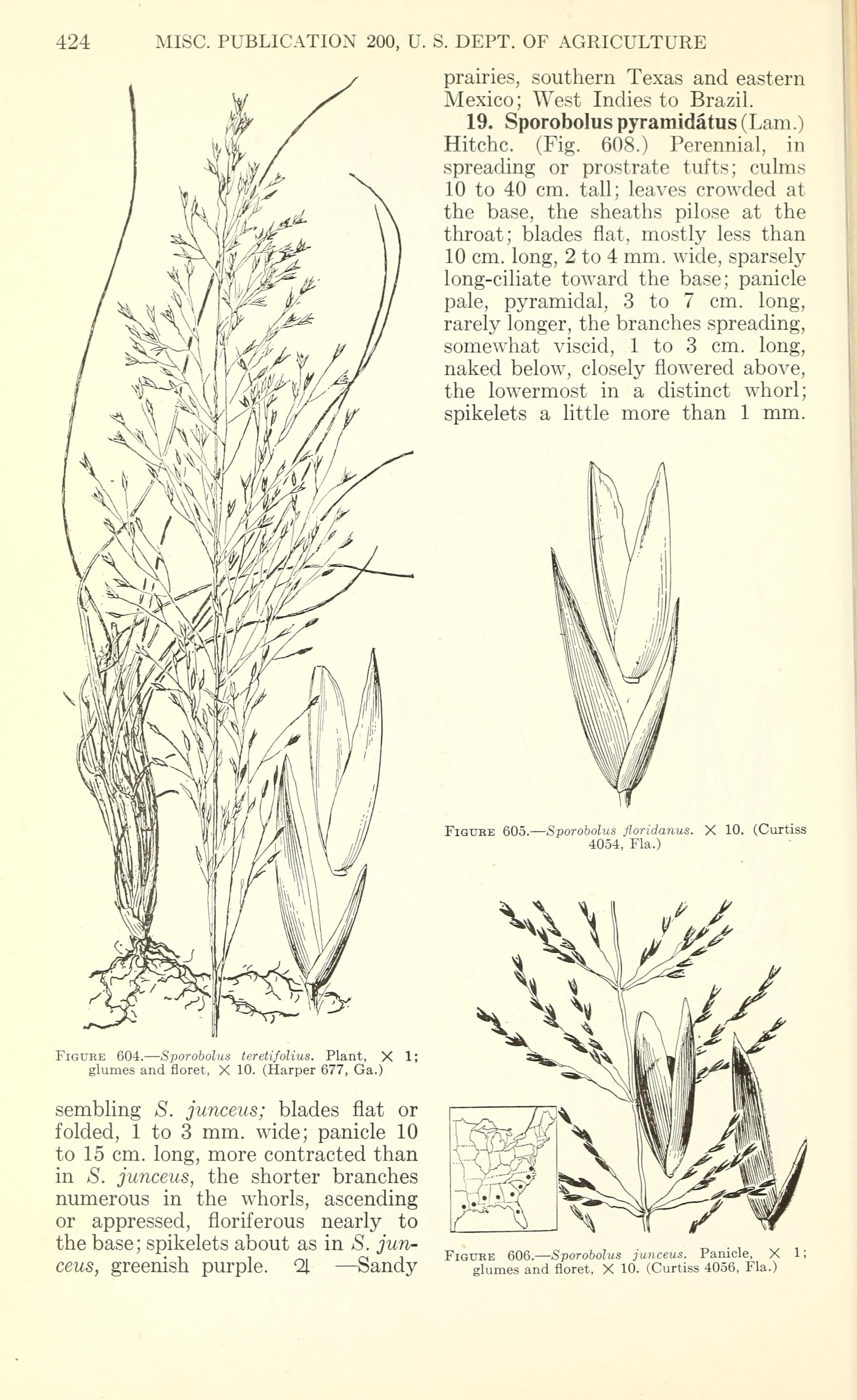

Scientific classification
- Kingdom: Plantae
- Clade: Tracheophytes
- Clade: Angiosperms
- Clade: Monocots
- Clade: Commelinids
- Order: Poales
- Family: Poaceae
- Subfamily: Chloridoideae
- Genus: Sporobolus
- Species: S. floridanus

Binomial name
- Sporobolus floridanus Chapm. 1860

= Sporobolus floridanus =

Florida dropseed

Sporobolus floridanus, commonly referred to as Florida dropseed, is a species of perennial graminoid, which is endemic to the southeastern region of the United States.

== Description ==
Sporobolus floridanus possesses culms that range in height between 1 and 2 m (3.3 and 6.6 ft) and pale blue-green blades that reach a length between 25 and 50 cm (10 and 20 in) and a width between 3 and 10 mm (0.12 and 0.39 in). The blades are glabrous on both sides.

The panicles range between 30 and 50 cm (12 and 20 in) in length and 4 to 15 cm (1.6 to 5.9 in) in width. Spikelets are purple to brown in color and 4 to 6 mm (0.16 to 0.24 in) in length. When fruit is produced it is reddish-brown in color and ranges from 1.7 to 2 mm (0.07 to 0.08 in) across.

== Distribution and habitat ==
The range of S. floridanus is limited to the southeasternmost corner of the United States, with populations found in South Carolina, Georgia, Alabama, and Florida. The majority of the species is located in Florida.

S. floridanus may be found in habitats such as wet pine savannas, bogs, treeless swales, and other mesic environments.

It is used an indicator species within mesic flatwood communities in northern Florida.
