= Bucculatrix sporobolella =

Scientific classification
- Kingdom: Animalia
- Phylum: Arthropoda
- Clade: Pancrustacea
- Class: Insecta
- Order: Lepidoptera
- Family: Bucculatricidae
- Genus: Bucculatrix
- Species: B. sporobolella

Binomial name
- Bucculatrix sporobolella Busck, 1910

Species of moth

Bucculatrix sporobolella is a moth in the family Bucculatricidae. It was described by August Busck in 1910 and is found in North America, where it has been recorded from New Mexico and California.

The larvae have been reported as feeding on Sporobolus airoides.
