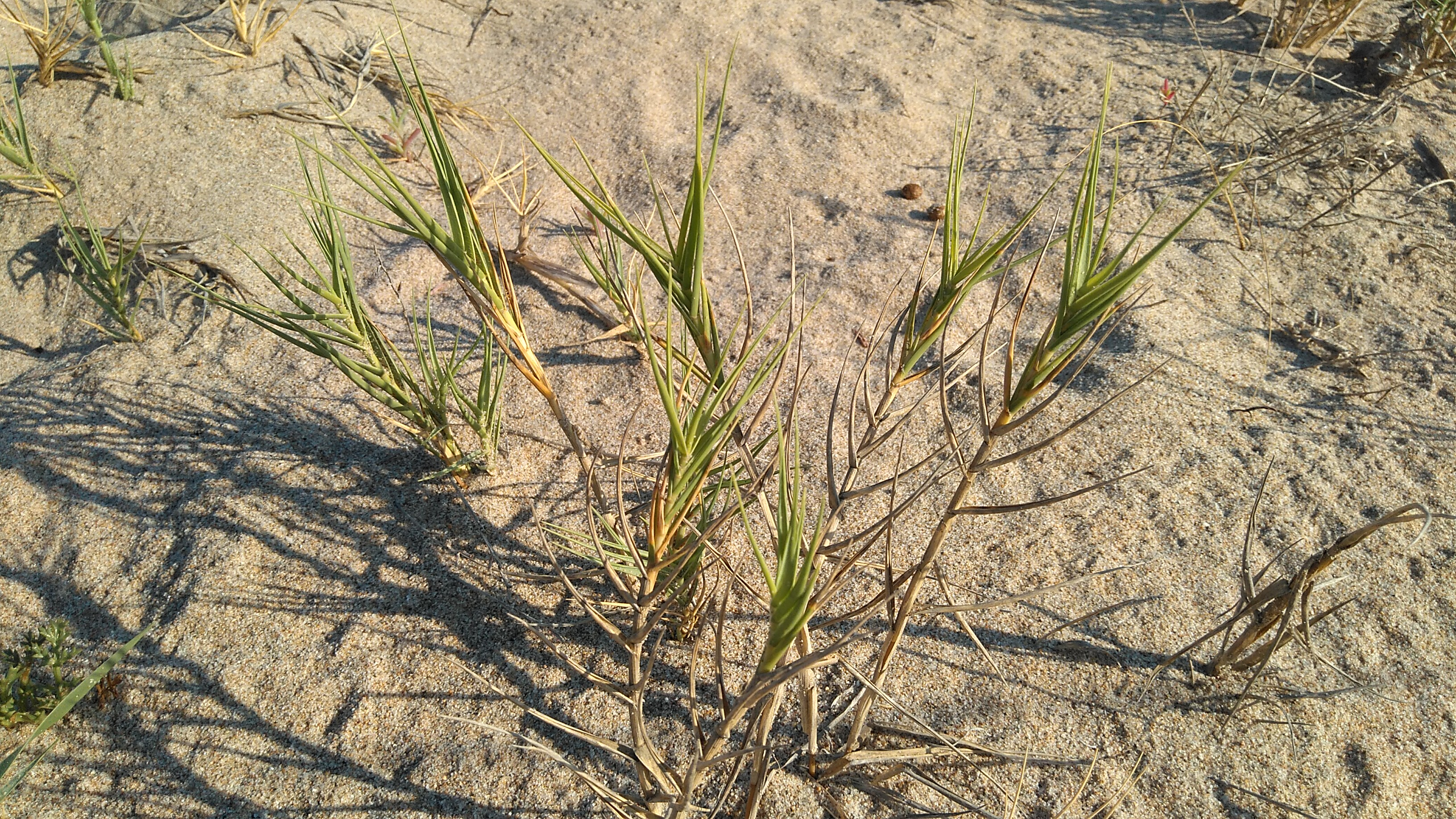

Scientific classification
- Kingdom: Plantae
- Clade: Tracheophytes
- Clade: Angiosperms
- Clade: Monocots
- Clade: Commelinids
- Order: Poales
- Family: Poaceae
- Subfamily: Chloridoideae
- Genus: Sporobolus
- Species: S. pungens

Binomial name
- Sporobolus pungens (Schreb.) Kunth

Synonyms
- Agrostis pungens

= Sporobolus pungens =

Species of plant

Sporobolus pungens is a species of perennial grass in the family Poaceae (true grasses). They have a self-supporting growth form and simple, broad leaves. Individuals can grow to 0.17 m.

== Sources ==
This article incorporates text from a free content work. Licensed under CC0 (license statement/permission). Text taken from Sporobolus pungens. Encyclopedia of Life.
