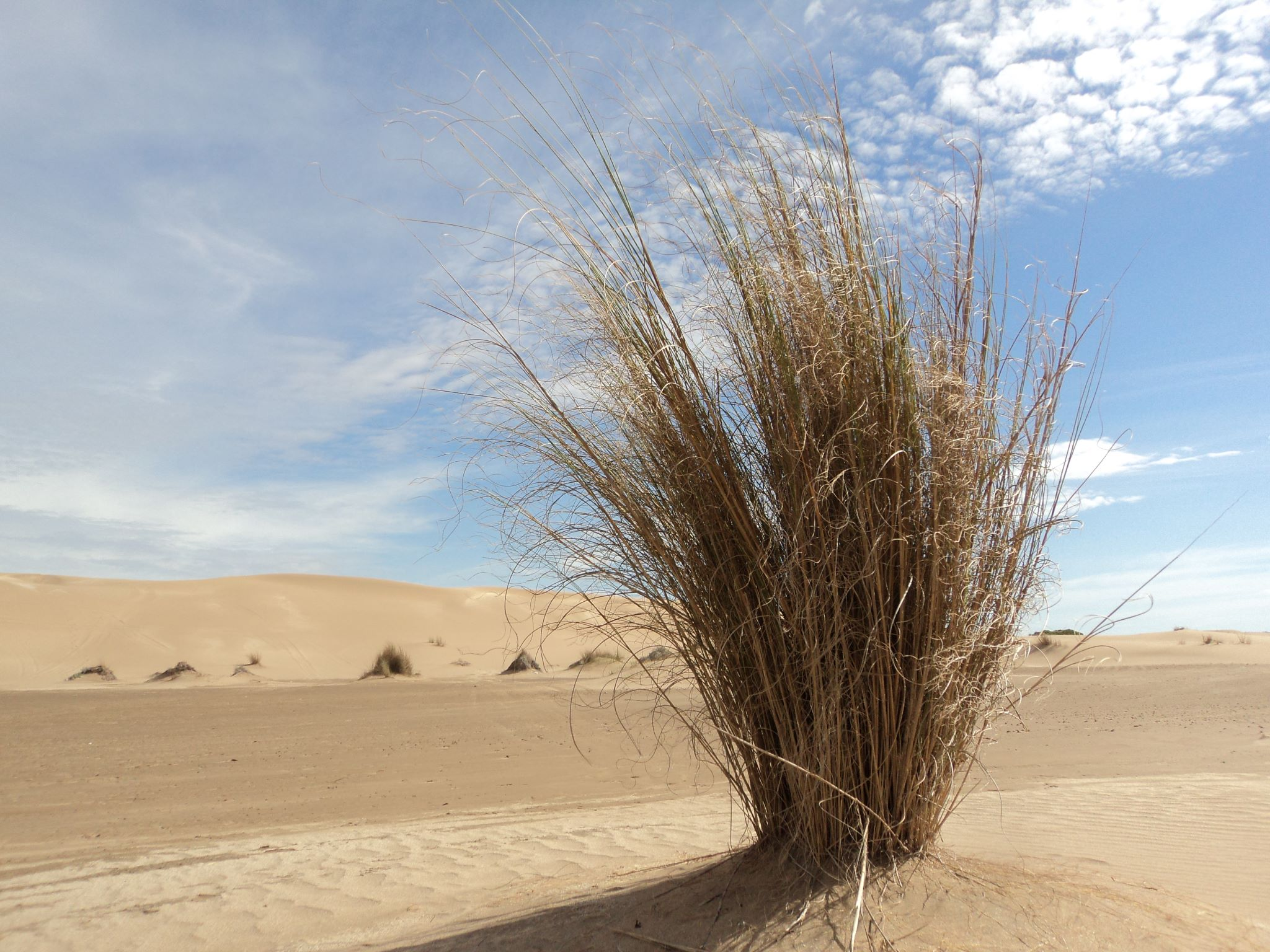

Conservation status
- Apparently Secure (NatureServe)

Scientific classification
- Kingdom: Plantae
- Clade: Tracheophytes
- Clade: Angiosperms
- Clade: Monocots
- Clade: Commelinids
- Order: Poales
- Family: Poaceae
- Subfamily: Chloridoideae
- Genus: Sporobolus
- Section: Spartina
- Species: S. spartinae

Binomial name
- Sporobolus spartinae (Trin.) P.M.Peterson & Saarela

Synonyms
- List: Spartina argentinensis Parodi; Spartina spartinae (Trin.) Merr. ex Hitchc.; Vilfa spartinae Trin.; Spartina densiflora var. junciformis (Engelm. & A.Gray) St.-Yves; Spartina densiflora var. obtusa Hack.; Spartina gouinii E.Fourn.; Spartina junciformis Engelm. & A.Gray; Spartina multiflora Beal; Spartina pittieri Hack.

= Sporobolus spartinae =

Species of plant

Sporobolus spartinae is a species of grass known by the common names gulf cordgrass and sacahuista. It is native to the Americas, where it occurs from the Gulf Coast of the United States south to Argentina.

This species forms dense clumps of sharp-tipped leaves. The stems may grow up to 2 meters tall. The inflorescence is a cylindrical panicle up to 70 centimeters long. It has many branches each a few centimetres long which grow pressed to the stem. They contain spikelets each up to a centimeter in length.

This grass grows in moist to wet habitat and it can live in saline environments. Habitat types include marshes and wet prairies. It can sometimes be found inland alongside Pinus palustris.
