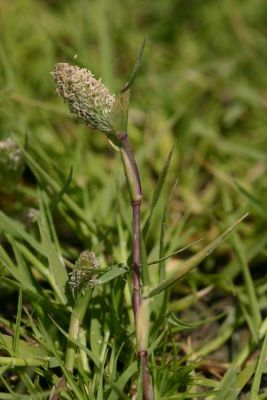

Conservation status
- Least Concern (IUCN 3.1)

Scientific classification
- Kingdom: Plantae
- Clade: Embryophytes
- Clade: Tracheophytes
- Clade: Angiosperms
- Clade: Monocots
- Clade: Commelinids
- Order: Poales
- Family: Poaceae
- Subfamily: Chloridoideae
- Genus: Sporobolus
- Species: S. schoenoides

Binomial name
- Sporobolus schoenoides (L.) P.M.Peterson

Synonyms
- List: Crypsis schoenoides (L.) Lam.; Heleochloa schoenoides (L.) Host ex Roem.; Phleum schoenoides L.; Spartina phleoides (L.) Roth; Spartina schoenoides (L.) Roth; Crypsis schoenoides var. gracilis Lojac.; Crypsis schoenoides f. minima Roshev.; Crypsis schoenoides var. minima Roshev.; Crypsis schoenoides var. minor Lange; Crypsis schoenoides var. subcylindrica Batt.; Heleochloa schoenoides var. macrostachys Podp.; Phleum supinum Lam.

= Sporobolus schoenoides =

Species of grass

Sporobolus schoenoides is a species of grass known by the common names swamp pricklegrass, swamp timothy, and cowpond grass. This grass is native to Europe but it is present in most other continents where it was introduced and took hold. This is an annual grass with purple-tinted green stems which forms mats and low clumps near water. It has wide-sheathed leaves and large sheaths that partially cover the inflorescences. The clublike inflorescence may exceed four centimetres (1.6 in) in length and two centimetres (0.79 in) in width. It is chunky and purple or purplish-green.
