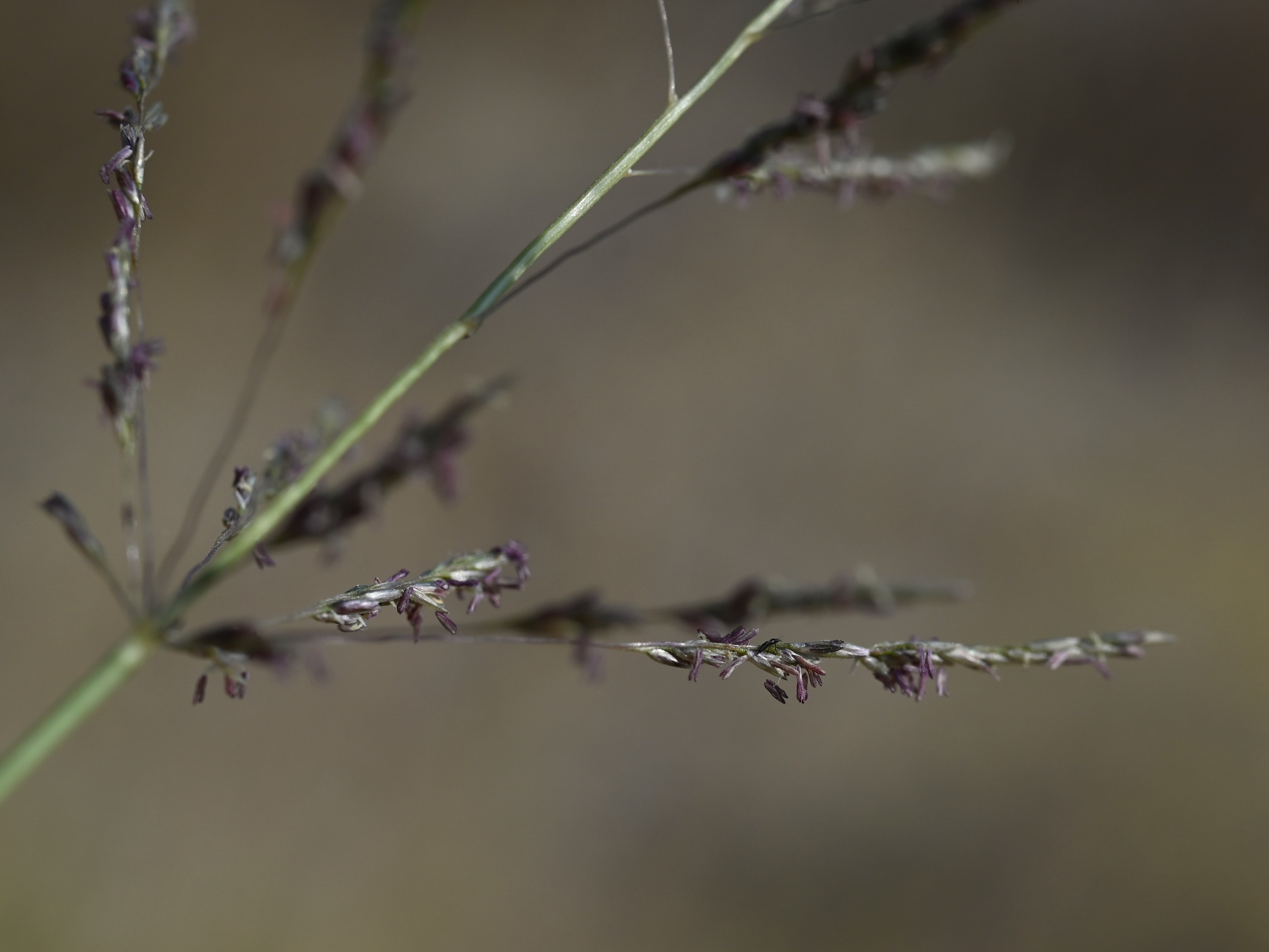
- In Oman
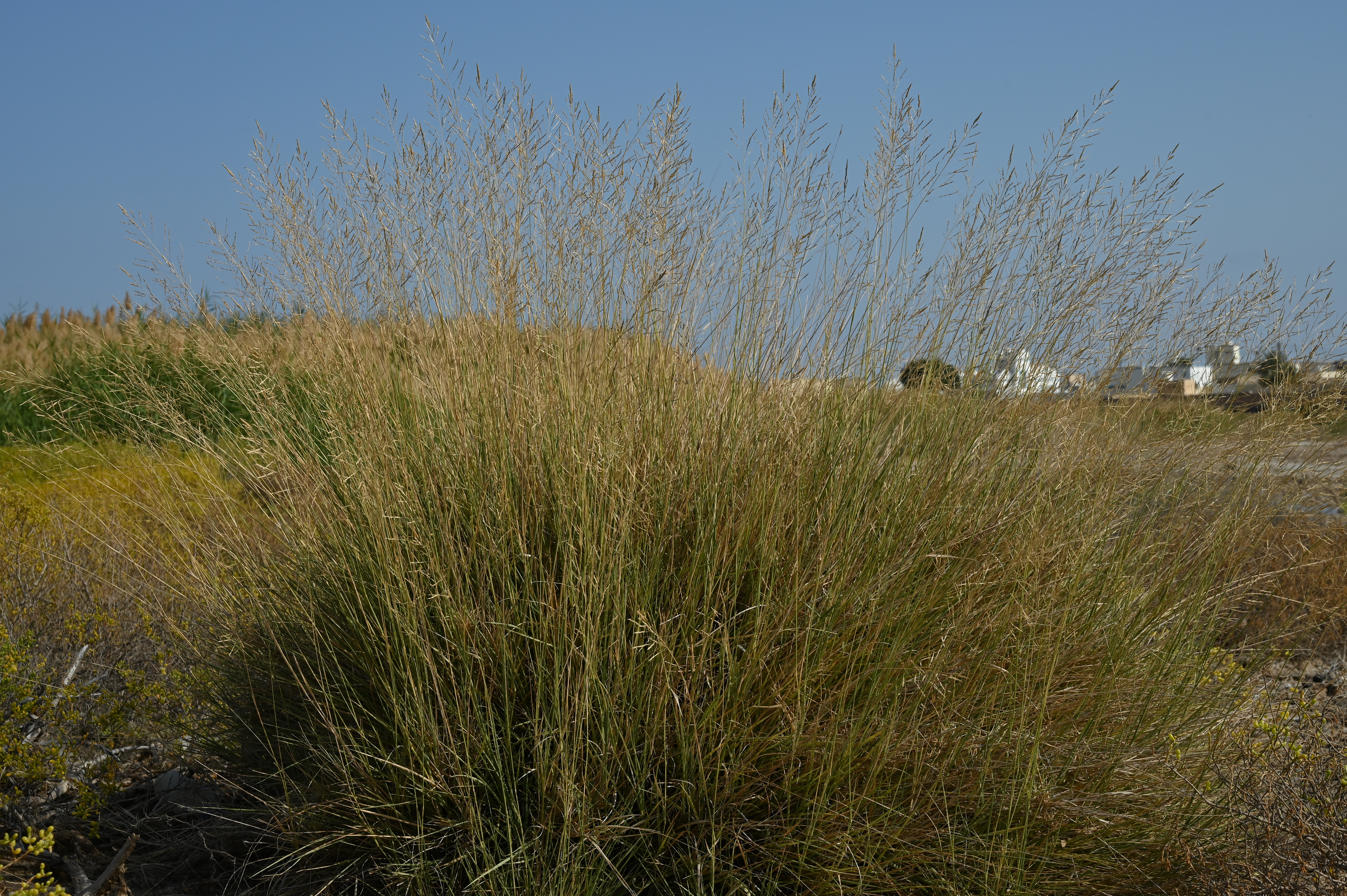
- Habit

Scientific classification
- Kingdom: Plantae
- Clade: Embryophytes
- Clade: Tracheophytes
- Clade: Angiosperms
- Clade: Monocots
- Clade: Commelinids
- Order: Poales
- Family: Poaceae
- Subfamily: Chloridoideae
- Genus: Sporobolus
- Species: S. ioclados

Binomial name
- Sporobolus ioclados (Nees ex Trin.) Nees

Synonyms
- List: Agrostis kentrophyllum K.Schum.; Sporobolus arabicus Boiss.; Sporobolus arabicus var. latifolius Peter; Sporobolus arabicus var. littoralis Peter; Sporobolus genalensis Chiov.; Sporobolus ghikae Schweinf. & Volkens; Sporobolus gillii Stent; Sporobolus inconspicuus Hack.; Sporobolus ioclados var. usitatus (Stent) Chippind.; Sporobolus jemenicus Pilg.; Sporobolus kentrophyllum (K.Schum.) Clayton; Sporobolus laetevirens Coss.; Sporobolus marginatus Hochst. ex A.Rich.; Sporobolus marginatus var. anceps Chiov.; Sporobolus marginatus var. scabrifolius Chiov.; Sporobolus pallidus (Nees ex Trin.) Boiss.; Sporobolus rangei Pilg.; Sporobolus seineri Mez; Sporobolus smutsii Stent; Sporobolus smutsii var. longifolius Gooss.; Sporobolus usitatus Stent; Sporobolus verdcourtii Napper; Sporobolus vryburgensis Stent; Vilfa arabica (Boiss.) Steud.; Vilfa ioclados Nees ex Trin.; Vilfa marginata (Hochst. ex A.Rich.) Steud.; Vilfa pallida Nees ex Trin.; Vilfa scabrifolia Hochst. ex Edgew.; Vilfa ioclados Nees ex Trin.

= Sporobolus ioclados =

Species of plant

Sporobolus ioclados (Note: This species is much better known by its synonym Sporobolus marginatus), the pan dropseed, is a species of flowering plant in the grass family Poaceae. It is native to seasonally dry areas with salty, sandy soils in Africa, Western Asia, and the Indian Subcontinent. A tussock-forming perennial reaching 15 to 90 cm (6 to 35 in), it is an extremophile halophyte. A C_{4} plant, it has been recognized as a variable but useful forage in saline soils.
