= Sporobolus jacquemontii =

Scientific classification
- Kingdom: Plantae
- Clade: Tracheophytes
- Clade: Angiosperms
- Clade: Monocots
- Clade: Commelinids
- Order: Poales
- Family: Poaceae
- Subfamily: Chloridoideae
- Genus: Sporobolus
- Species: S. jacquemontii

Binomial name
- Sporobolus jacquemontii Kunth

Synonyms
- Sporobolus pyramidalis P. Beauv. var. jacquemontii (Kunth) Jovet & Guds; Vilfa jacquemontii (Kunth) Trin.

Species of grass

Sporobolus jacquemontii, commonly known as American rat's tail grass, is a species of grass native to the southeastern United States, Central and South America. It has become a weed in Queensland in Australia.

== Taxonomy ==
The Latin specific epithet jacquemontii refers to the French botanist and geologist Victor Jacquemont (1844–1912).
