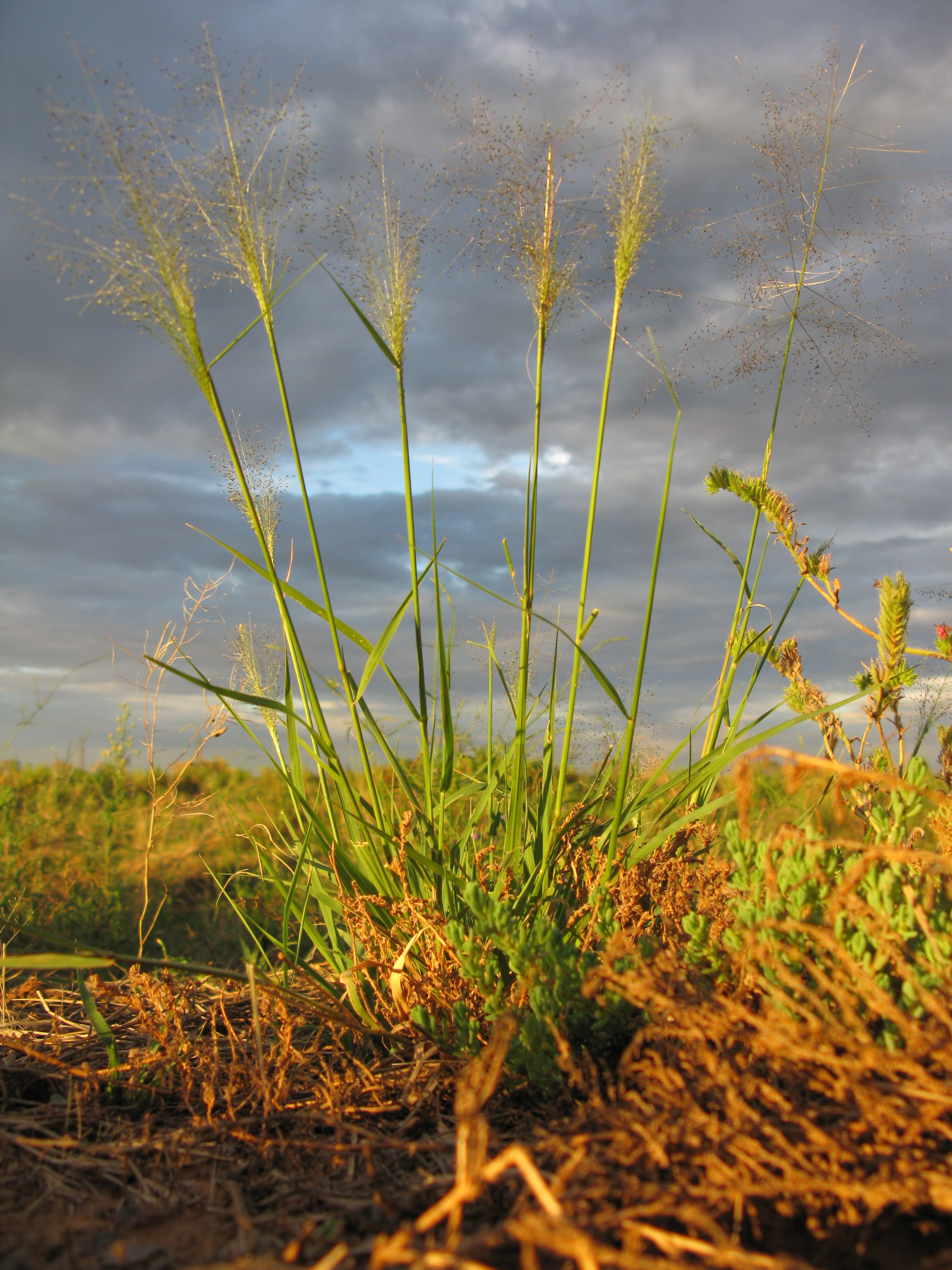

Scientific classification
- Kingdom: Plantae
- Clade: Embryophytes
- Clade: Tracheophytes
- Clade: Spermatophytes
- Clade: Angiosperms
- Clade: Monocots
- Clade: Commelinids
- Order: Poales
- Family: Poaceae
- Subfamily: Chloridoideae
- Genus: Sporobolus
- Species: S. caroli

Binomial name
- Sporobolus caroli Mez

Synonyms
- Heterotypic Synonyms: Sporobolus subtilis F.Muell.

= Sporobolus caroli =

Species of plant

Sporobolus caroli is a species of flowering plant in the grass family, Poaceae. It is sometimes referred to by the common names fairy grass or yakka grass. It is a native to inland Australia and is an introduced species in Germany.
