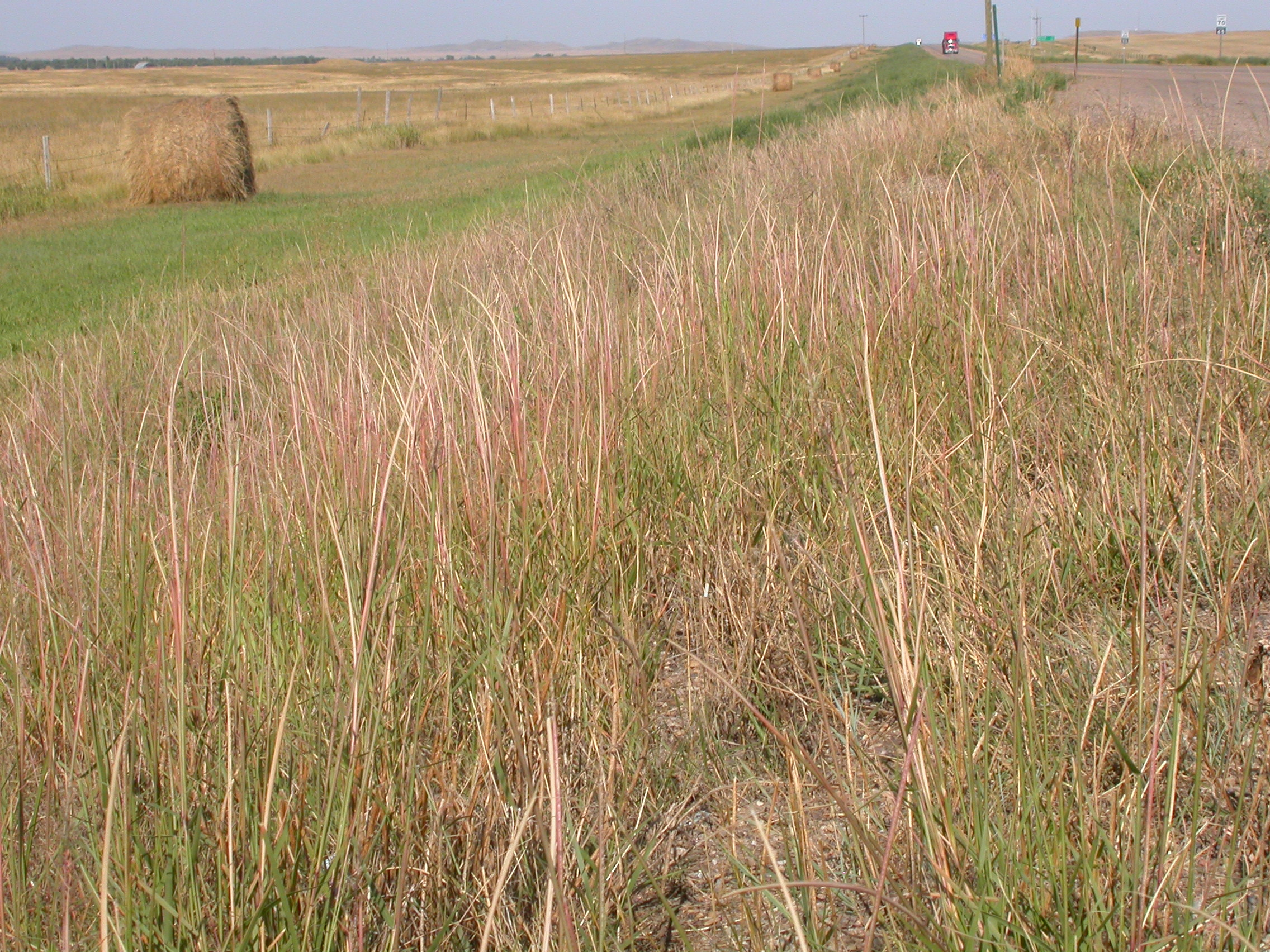
- Growing on a roadside near Alzada, Montana

Scientific classification
- Kingdom: Plantae
- Clade: Tracheophytes
- Clade: Angiosperms
- Clade: Monocots
- Clade: Commelinids
- Order: Poales
- Family: Poaceae
- Subfamily: Chloridoideae
- Genus: Sporobolus
- Species: S. cryptandrus

Binomial name
- Sporobolus cryptandrus (Torr.) A.Gray

= Sporobolus cryptandrus =

Species of grass

Sporobolus cryptandrus, commonly known as sand dropseed, is a species of grass in the family Poaceae. It is native to North America, where it is widespread in southern Canada, most of the United States, and northern Mexico.

== Description ==
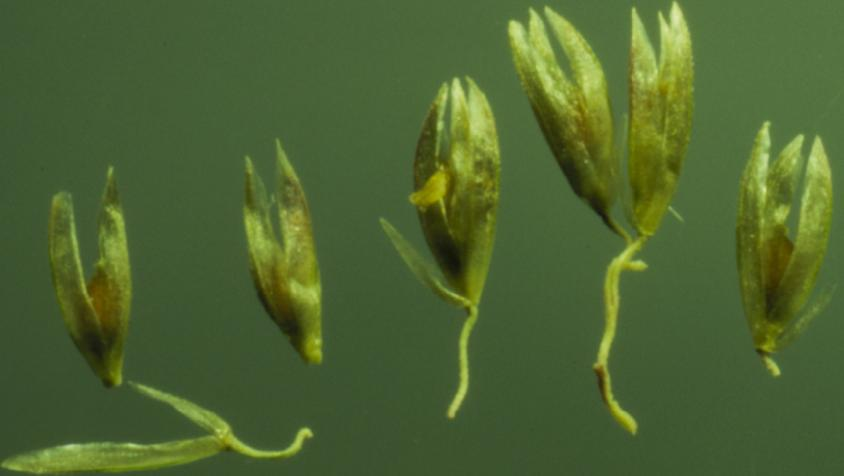
Spikelets

Sporobolus cryptandrus is a perennial bunchgrass that forms loose tufts of erect to decumbent stems, which can grow up to one meter in length. The stem bases are thickened but remain non-woody. The leaves are rough-haired along the margins, reaching up to 26 centimeters (10 in) in length, and some emerge perpendicularly from the stem. Its inflorescence is initially dense and narrow, eventually spreading out with age, and may be partly sheathed within the uppermost leaf. The species produces a large number of small seeds—each inflorescence can bear up to 10,000—which enhances its ability to colonize new areas and establish a persistent presence in the seed bank. These tiny seeds, approximately 1 mm in size, are often sticky when wet, which may facilitate dispersal via animals or equipment.

== Habitat ==
Sand dropseed is a common grass in many types of North American prairies and grows in a wide variety of other habitats, including disturbed areas such as roadsides.

In its native range, S. cryptandrus is common across a variety of habitats including prairies, sagebrush deserts, chaparral, and disturbed environments such as roadsides and dry riverbeds. It typically prefers sandy soils and often acts as an early successional species in both arid and semi-arid systems. The species is considered a component of climax plant communities on deep sands, particularly at low elevations.

Beyond North America, S. cryptandrus has become increasingly invasive in parts of Central and Eastern Europe. In Hungary, it has rapidly expanded since its discovery in 2016 and has now been documented in over 620 localities. These include urban grasslands, degraded steppes, sandy forest-steppe mosaics, and old fields of various successional stages. It is particularly common in disturbed and dry habitats, where it establishes along dirt roads, motocross trails, firebreaks, and plowed plantation edges. The spread of this species has been especially pronounced in the Kiskunság and Nyírség regions of Hungary, where large stands have formed in both natural and anthropogenically altered environments.

== Ecology ==
The seeds of S. cryptandrus are consumed by a range of small birds and mammals, including scaled quail (Callipepla squamata) and black-tailed prairie dogs (Cynomys ludovicianus), providing a food source within the ecosystems it inhabits. Ecologically, the species is notable for its C4 photosynthetic pathway, which allows it to photosynthesize efficiently under conditions of high light, temperature, and drought. This physiology gives it a competitive advantage in the warm and dry environments where it thrives.

One of the defining ecological features of S. cryptandrus is its ability to build a dense and long-lasting soil seed bank. Recent studies in Central Europe have found seed densities of up to 95,000 seeds per square meter in the upper soil layers of invaded sites. The seeds are especially concentrated within the top 2.5 centimeters of soil, although viable seeds are often found deeper. The persistence of these seed banks enables the species to recolonize rapidly after disturbances such as fire, mowing, or drought, and makes management particularly challenging. Viable seeds have even been detected in areas where the species is no longer visible above ground, indicating a significant potential for future re-emergence.

Seed bank studies have revealed that while increasing S. cryptandrus cover correlates with a higher proportion of its seeds in the soil, it does not necessarily lead to a reduction in the density or diversity of other species' seeds. However, in vegetation, increasing cover is often associated with lower species richness and altered community composition. The discrepancy between the soil seed bank and aboveground patterns suggests a lag in ecological impact, with belowground communities serving as a form of successional memory that can buffer or delay the effects of invasion.

== Invasive potential and management challenges ==
Sporobolus cryptandrus has been classified as a transformer invasive species in its introduced range due to its capacity to modify ecological processes and displace native vegetation. In Hungary, the species has spread aggressively into both disturbed and semi-natural grasslands, reducing biodiversity and altering plant community structure. Its expansion is facilitated by anthropogenic disturbances such as road construction, plowing, and firebreak creation, which expose bare soil and trigger germination from the seed bank.

Climate change is expected to exacerbate the invasion potential of S. cryptandrus. As droughts, heatwaves, and wildfires become more frequent in Central and Southern Europe, C4 grasses like S. cryptandrus may gain further advantages over native C3 species. The species is particularly well-suited to thrive under elevated atmospheric CO_{2} levels and increased aridity, both of which are predicted in future climate scenarios. In this context, even previously resistant ecosystems may become vulnerable to its establishment and spread.

The management of S. cryptandrus is complicated by its reproductive strategy and ecological plasticity. Strategies such as mowing, grazing, and suppression through competition with native species are being explored, but their effectiveness remains uncertain. There is also a need to assess the species' potential allelopathic effects, its interactions with native flora and fauna, and the possible role of natural enemies in biocontrol. Preventing soil disturbance remains one of the most effective ways to limit its spread, but this is not always feasible in dynamic or multi-use landscapes.
