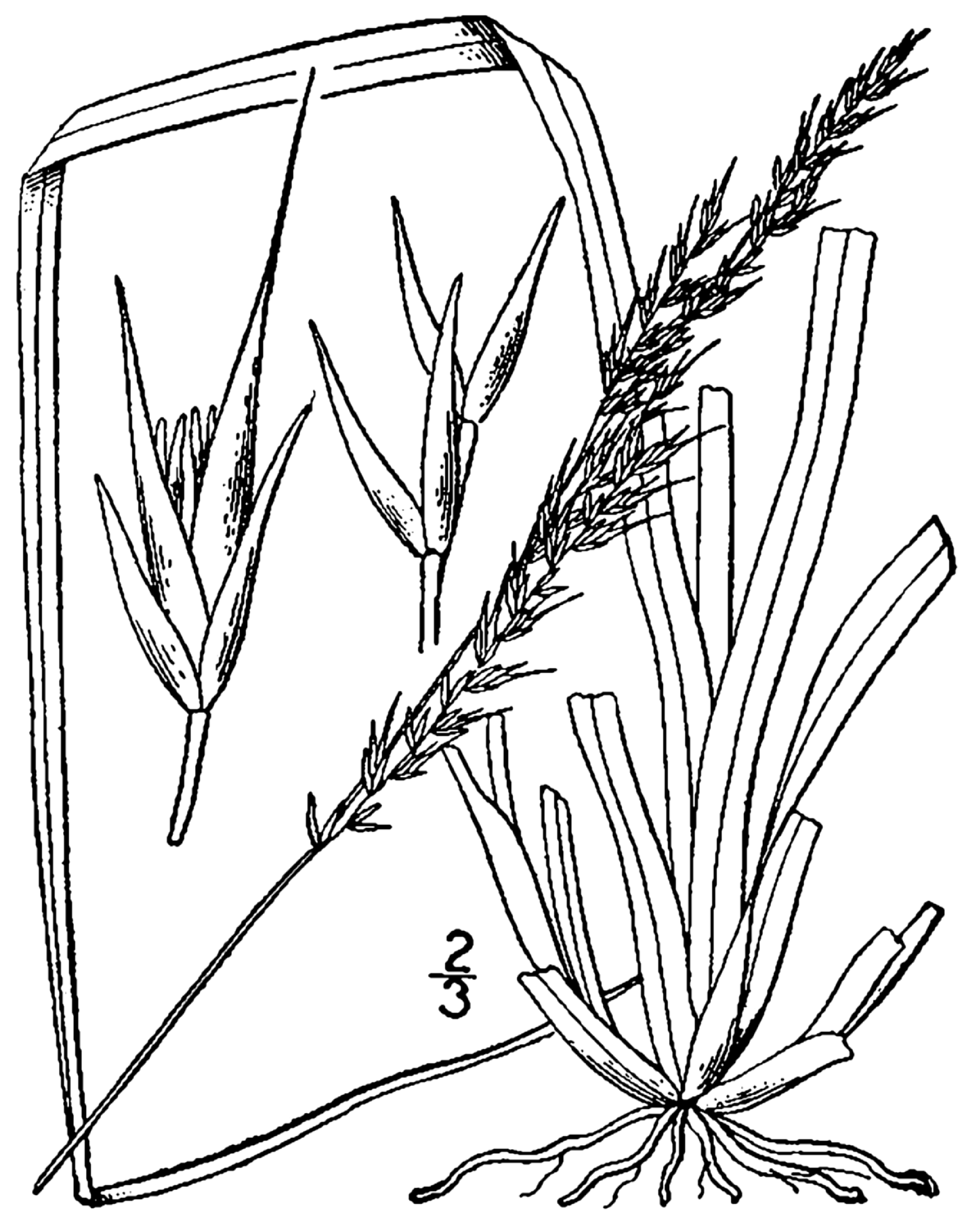
- 1913 illustration

Scientific classification
- Kingdom: Plantae
- Clade: Tracheophytes
- Clade: Angiosperms
- Clade: Monocots
- Clade: Commelinids
- Order: Poales
- Family: Poaceae
- Subfamily: Chloridoideae
- Genus: Sporobolus
- Species: S. clandestinus

Binomial name
- Sporobolus clandestinus (Biehler) Hitchc.

= Sporobolus clandestinus =

Species of grass

Sporobolus clandestinus, common names rough dropseed and rough rushgrass, is a species of grass found in North America. It is listed as endangered in Connecticut, Maryland, New York, and Pennsylvania and listed as threatened in Kentucky.
