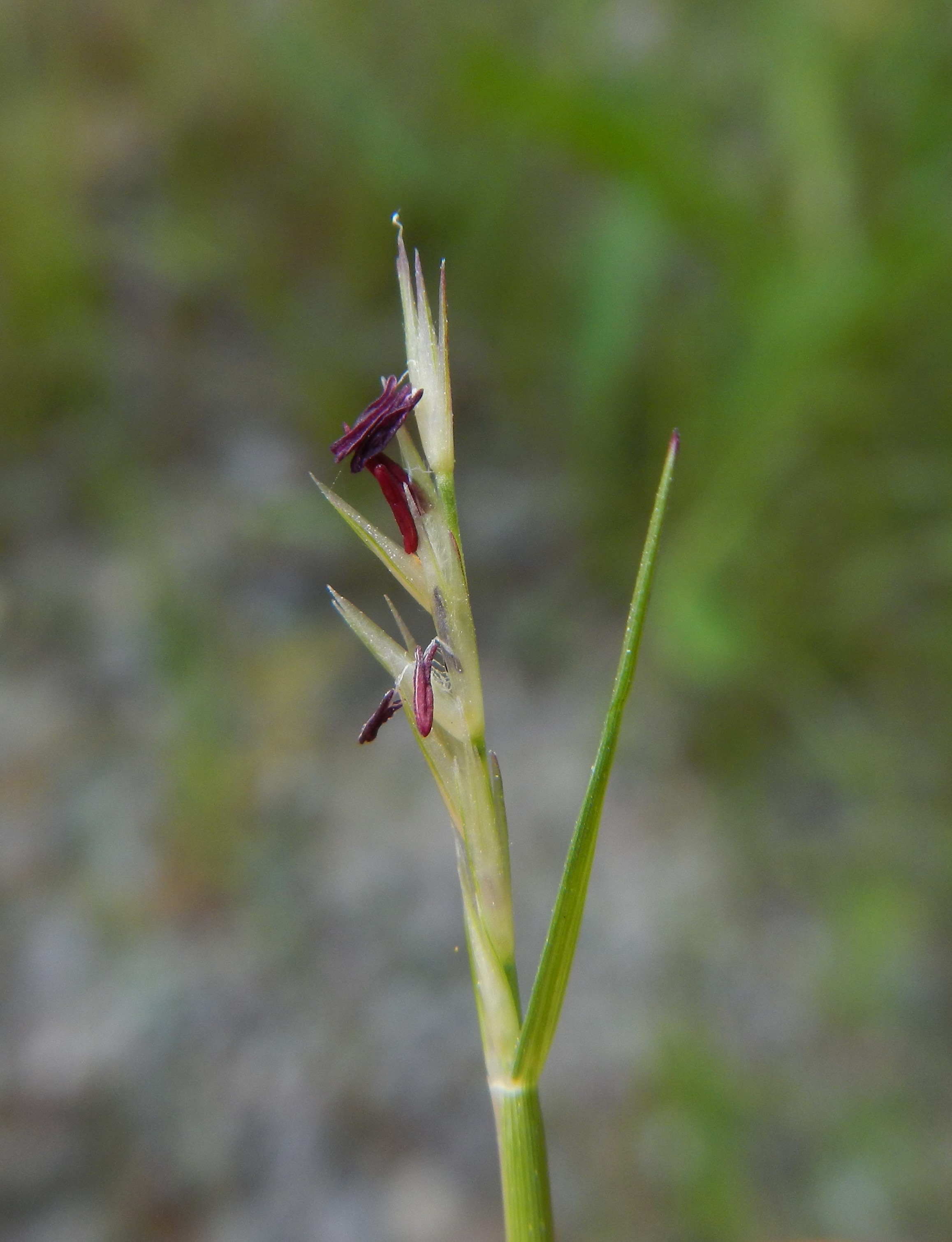

Scientific classification
- Kingdom: Plantae
- Clade: Tracheophytes
- Clade: Angiosperms
- Clade: Monocots
- Clade: Commelinids
- Order: Poales
- Family: Poaceae
- Subfamily: Chloridoideae
- Genus: Sporobolus
- Species: S. vaginiflorus

Binomial name
- Sporobolus vaginiflorus (Torr. ex A.Gray) Alph.Wood

= Sporobolus vaginiflorus =

Species of flowering plant

Sporobolus vaginiflorus is a species of grass known by the common names poverty grass, poverty dropseed, and sheathed dropseed.

== Distribution ==
This bunchgrass is native to eastern, central North America, including the Great Plains, extreme Southwestern United States, and the California Sierra Nevada. It is present elsewhere in western and northwestern North America, as native or an introduced species.

It grows in many types of habitats, including grasslands, open woodlands, and montane meadows, often in disturbed areas and in sandy and calcareous soils.

== Description ==
Sporobolus vaginiflorus is an annual bunchgrass producing one or more stems 70 to 80 cm (28 to 31 in) long. The wiry stems may be decumbent or erect, and are bent near the bases. They are sheathed by the leaf bases, which are sometimes swollen or inflated and may have lines or tufts of short hairs. The herbage is green to purple in color.

The inflorescence is a dense, narrow, spikelike panicle no more than about 5 cm (2 in) long. It may be partially or completely enclosed in the sheath of the uppermost leaf. The spikelets are purple, pinkish, yellowish, or grayish in color and may be shiny.
