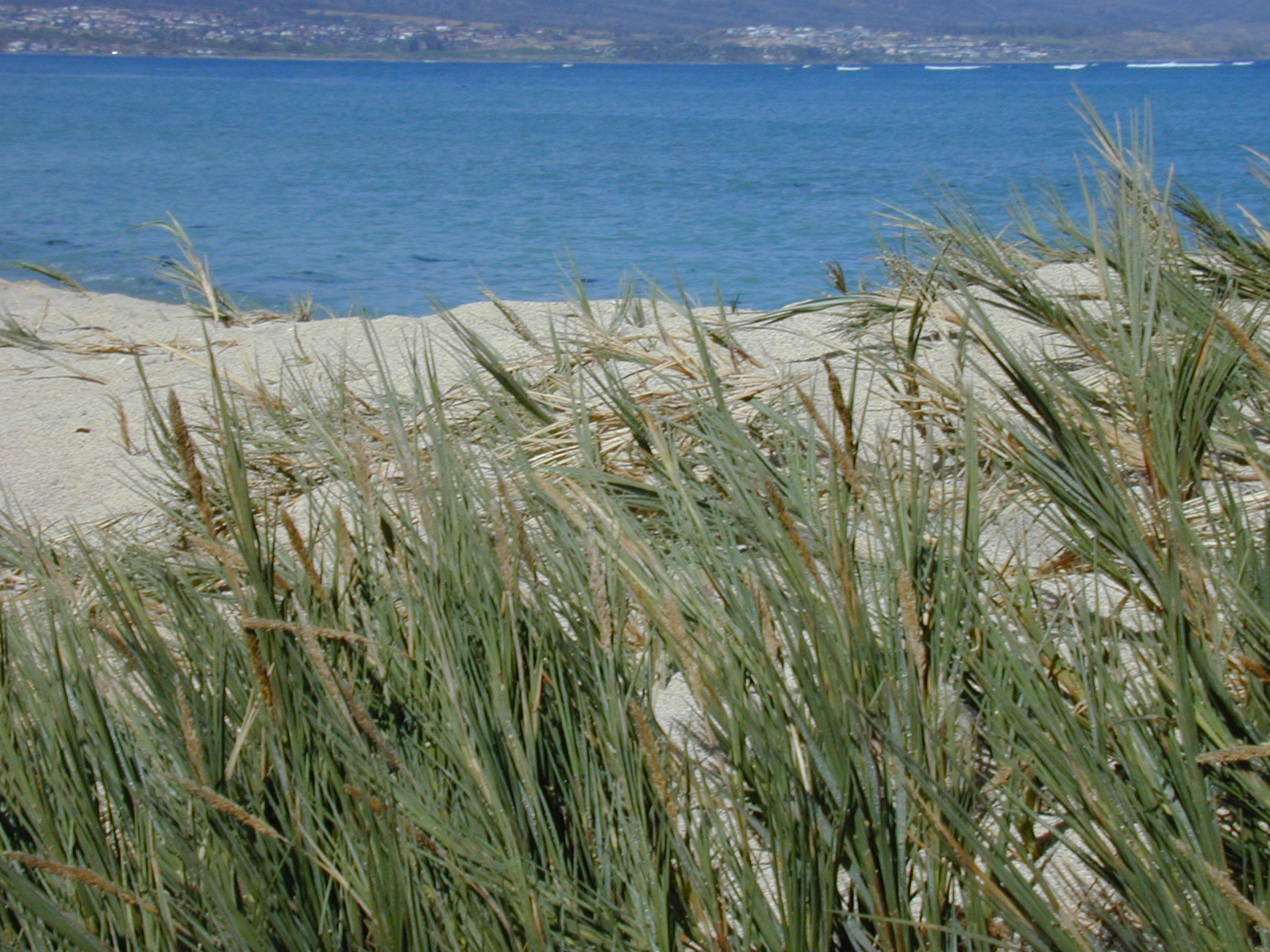

Conservation status
- Least Concern (IUCN 3.1)

- Secure (NatureServe)

Scientific classification
- Kingdom: Plantae
- Clade: Tracheophytes
- Clade: Angiosperms
- Clade: Monocots
- Clade: Commelinids
- Order: Poales
- Family: Poaceae
- Subfamily: Chloridoideae
- Genus: Sporobolus
- Species: S. virginicus

Binomial name
- Sporobolus virginicus (L.) Kunth

Synonyms
- Agrostis virginica Linnaeus; Vilfa virginica (L.) P. Beauv.; Podosemum virginica (L.) Link; Agrostis littoralis Lam.; Sporobolus virginicus var. virginicus; Sporobolus benthamii var. robustus Domin; Sporobolus virginicus var. pallidus Benth.; Sporobolus virginicus var. minor F.M. Bailey ex B.K. Simon; Vilfa intermedia Trin.

= Sporobolus virginicus =

Species of plant

Sporobolus virginicus, known by numerous common names including seashore dropseed, marine couch, sand couch, salt couch grass, saltwater couch, coastal rat-tail grass, and nioaka, is a species of grass with a wide distribution.

== Description ==
It is a spreading perennial tussock grass from 10 to 50 cm (3.9 to 19.7 in) in height. Its flowers are green or purple. It reproduces asexually by use of both stolons and rhizomes.

== Taxonomy ==
It was originally published by Carl Linnaeus in 1753, under the name Agrostis virginicus. It was transferred into Sporobolus by Karl Sigismund Kunth in 1829. It has a great many synonyms.

At least in Australia, the species can grade between narrow and broad leaf forms.

== Distribution and habitat ==
It grows in Australia, New Zealand, many Pacific Islands, the Caribbean, Africa, India, China and Indonesia. It is widespread in Australia, occurring in every state.
