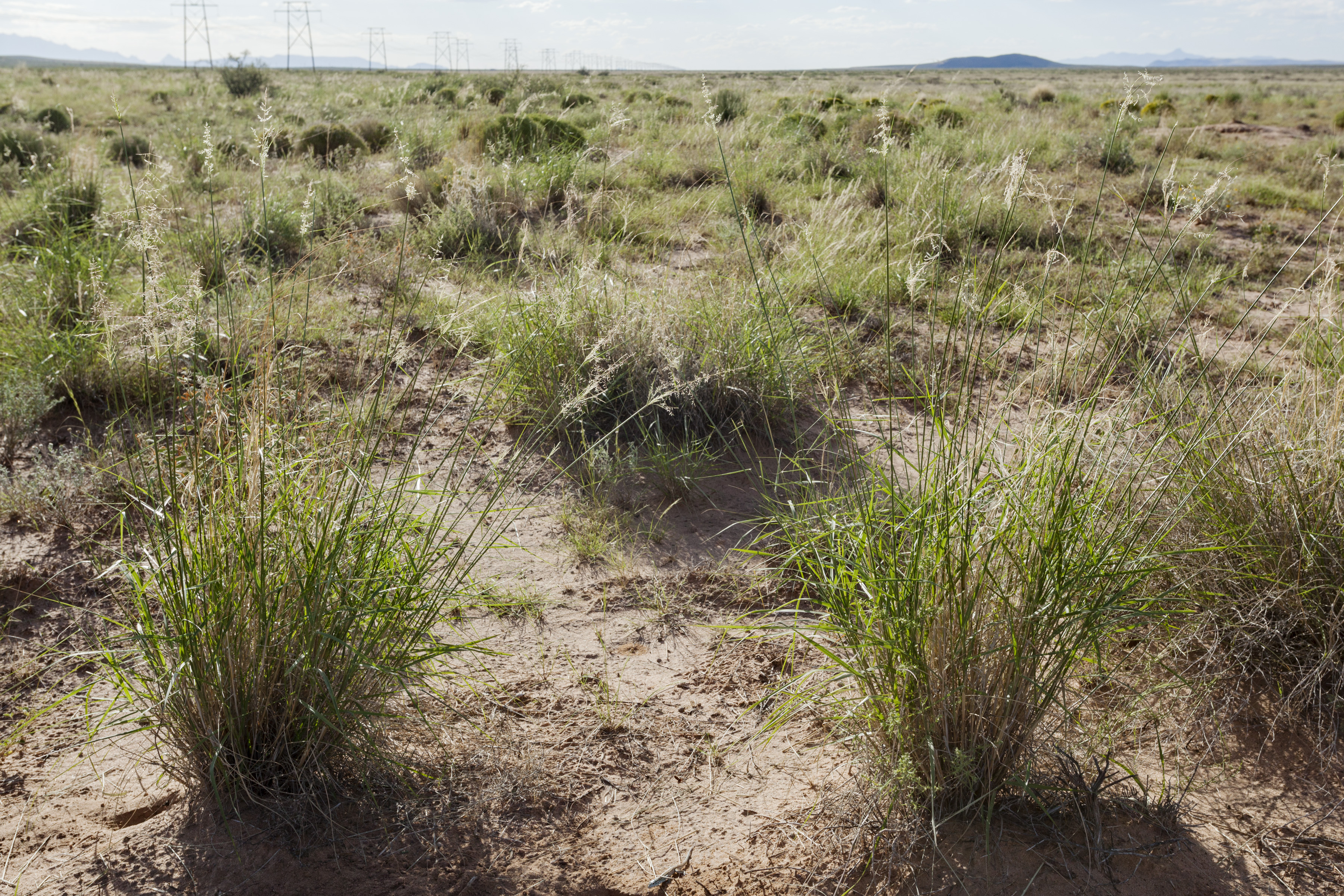

Scientific classification
- Kingdom: Plantae
- Clade: Tracheophytes
- Clade: Angiosperms
- Clade: Monocots
- Clade: Commelinids
- Order: Poales
- Family: Poaceae
- Subfamily: Chloridoideae
- Genus: Sporobolus
- Species: S. flexuosus

Binomial name
- Sporobolus flexuosus (Thurb. ex Vasey) Rydb.

= Sporobolus flexuosus =

Species of flowering plant

Sporobolus flexuosus is a species of grass known by the common name mesa dropseed. It is native to western North America, where it can be found in the deserts and woodlands of the Southwestern United States and Northern Mexico.

This bunchgrass forms a tuft of stems growing up to 1 metre (3.3 ft) long, erect to decumbent in form. It is a perennial grass but it is short-lived and is sometimes an annual. The leaves are up to 26 centimetres (10 in) long and rough-haired along the margins. The inflorescence is an open panicle of spreading branches bearing grayish spikelets.
