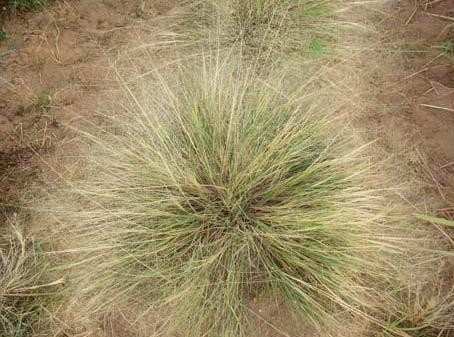

Conservation status
- Secure (NatureServe)

Scientific classification
- Kingdom: Plantae
- Clade: Tracheophytes
- Clade: Angiosperms
- Clade: Monocots
- Clade: Commelinids
- Order: Poales
- Family: Poaceae
- Subfamily: Chloridoideae
- Genus: Sporobolus
- Species: S. texanus

Binomial name
- Sporobolus texanus Vasey

= Sporobolus texanus =

Species of grass

Sporobolus texanus is a species of grass known by the common name Texas dropseed. It is native to the western United States.

This species is a perennial bunchgrass with fibrous roots. The stems grow 20 to 70 cm (7.9 to 27.6 in) long and may be erect or decumbent. The leaf blades are up to 18 cm long, but are generally shorter. The panicle is an open array of thin branches bearing tiny purplish spikelets.

This species is added to seed mixes for rangeland. It can tolerate saline and alkaline soils, such as those around oil well pads. It grows close to the ground and has fibrous roots, which help it bind the soil to reduce erosion. It provides good cover for small animals.
