= Sporobolus durus =

Conservation status
- Extinct (After 1886) (IUCN 3.1)

Scientific classification
- Kingdom: Plantae
- Clade: Tracheophytes
- Clade: Angiosperms
- Clade: Monocots
- Clade: Commelinids
- Order: Poales
- Family: Poaceae
- Subfamily: Chloridoideae
- Genus: Sporobolus
- Species: †S. durus

Binomial name
- †Sporobolus durus Brongn.

Extinct species of grass

Sporobolus durus was a species of grass in the family Poaceae, found only on Ascension Island in the South Atlantic. It went extinct due to overgrazing and displacement by invasive weeds. Its date of extinction is unknown; it was last recorded in 1886 but not searched for, specifically, until 1998.
