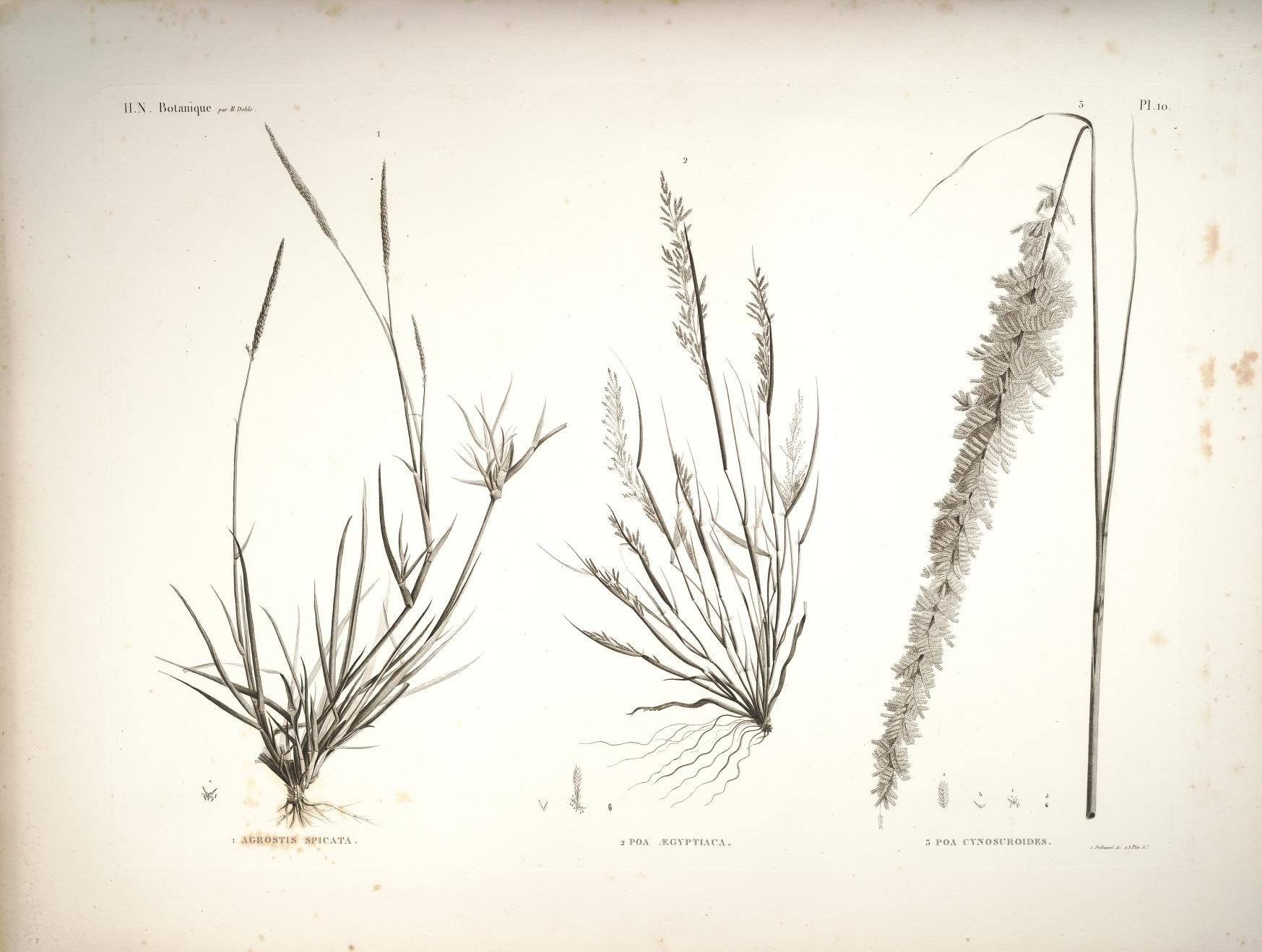
- Sporobolus spicatus (plant on left side)

Scientific classification
- Kingdom: Plantae
- Clade: Tracheophytes
- Clade: Angiosperms
- Clade: Monocots
- Clade: Commelinids
- Order: Poales
- Family: Poaceae
- Subfamily: Chloridoideae
- Genus: Sporobolus
- Species: S. spicatus

Binomial name
- Sporobolus spicatus Kunth

= Sporobolus spicatus =

Species of plant

Sporobolus spicatus, also known as salt grass, is a halophyte.

== Distribution ==
This bunchgrass is distributed:

- in dryer parts of Africa such as Namibia, as a well known common plant in the western desert of Egypt
- from the Mediterranean coast to South Africa
- from the Middle East southwest to Pakistan and India.

== Description ==
Sporobolus spicatus is a perennial bunchgrass forming turfs near water and which has short, pointed flat blade leaves. It grows up to a maximum height of 40 cm and is distinguishable by a dark green colour.
