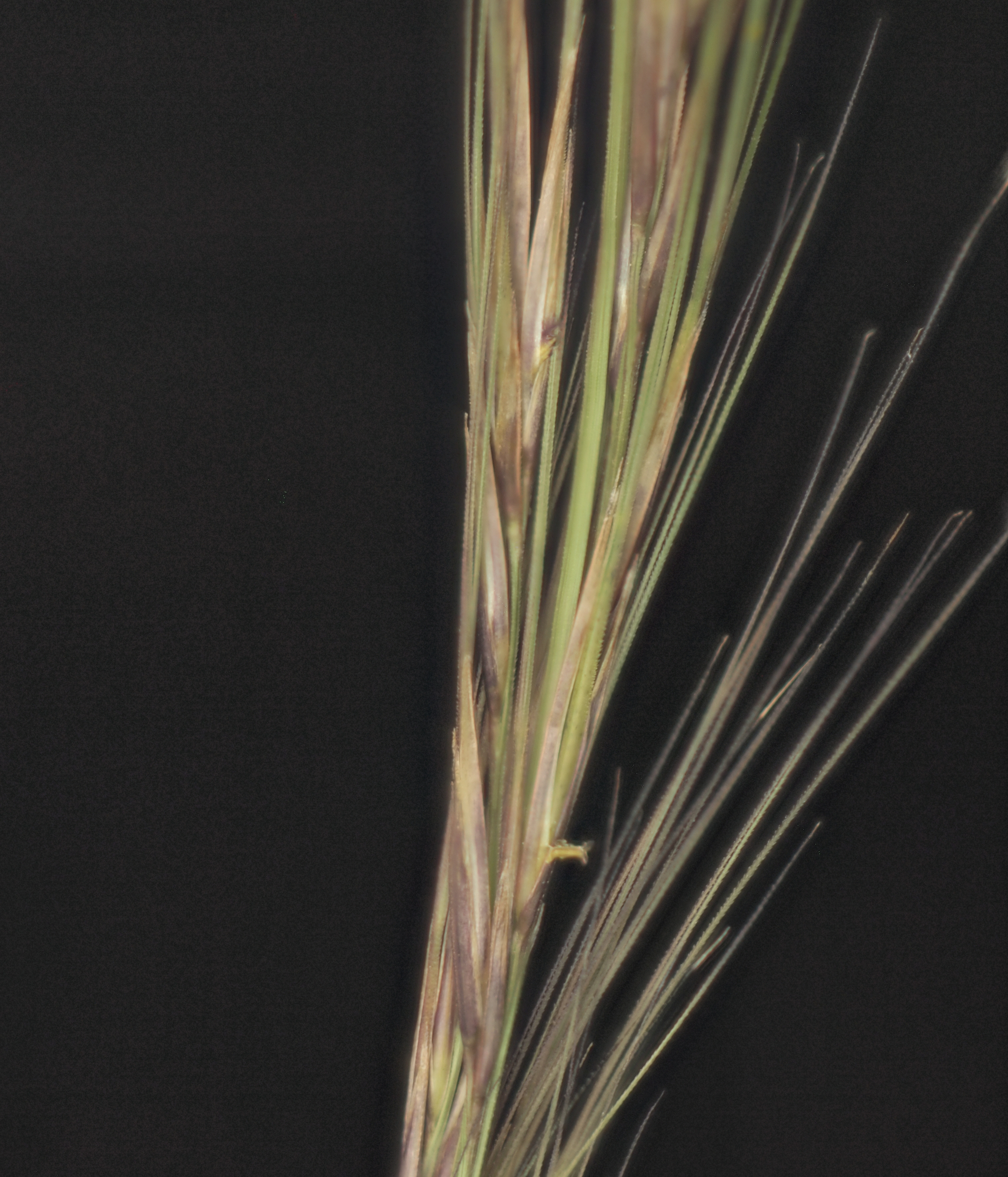

Scientific classification
- Kingdom: Plantae
- Clade: Tracheophytes
- Clade: Angiosperms
- Clade: Monocots
- Clade: Commelinids
- Order: Poales
- Family: Poaceae
- Subfamily: Chloridoideae
- Genus: Sporobolus
- Species: S. contractus

Binomial name
- Sporobolus contractus Hitchc.

= Sporobolus contractus =

Species of flowering plant

Sporobolus contractus is a species of grass known by the common name spike dropseed. It is native to western North America, including the southwestern United States and northern Mexico. It grows in desert and plateau habitat, in woodlands, scrub, and dry, sandy, open areas.

== Description ==
It is a perennial bunchgrass forming a clump or tuft of stems reaching up to 1.2 m (3.9 ft) in maximum height. The stem bases are thick and sheathed by the hairless leaves. The inflorescence is dense, cylindrical, and narrow. It is a spikelike series of many small whitish or grayish spikelets.
