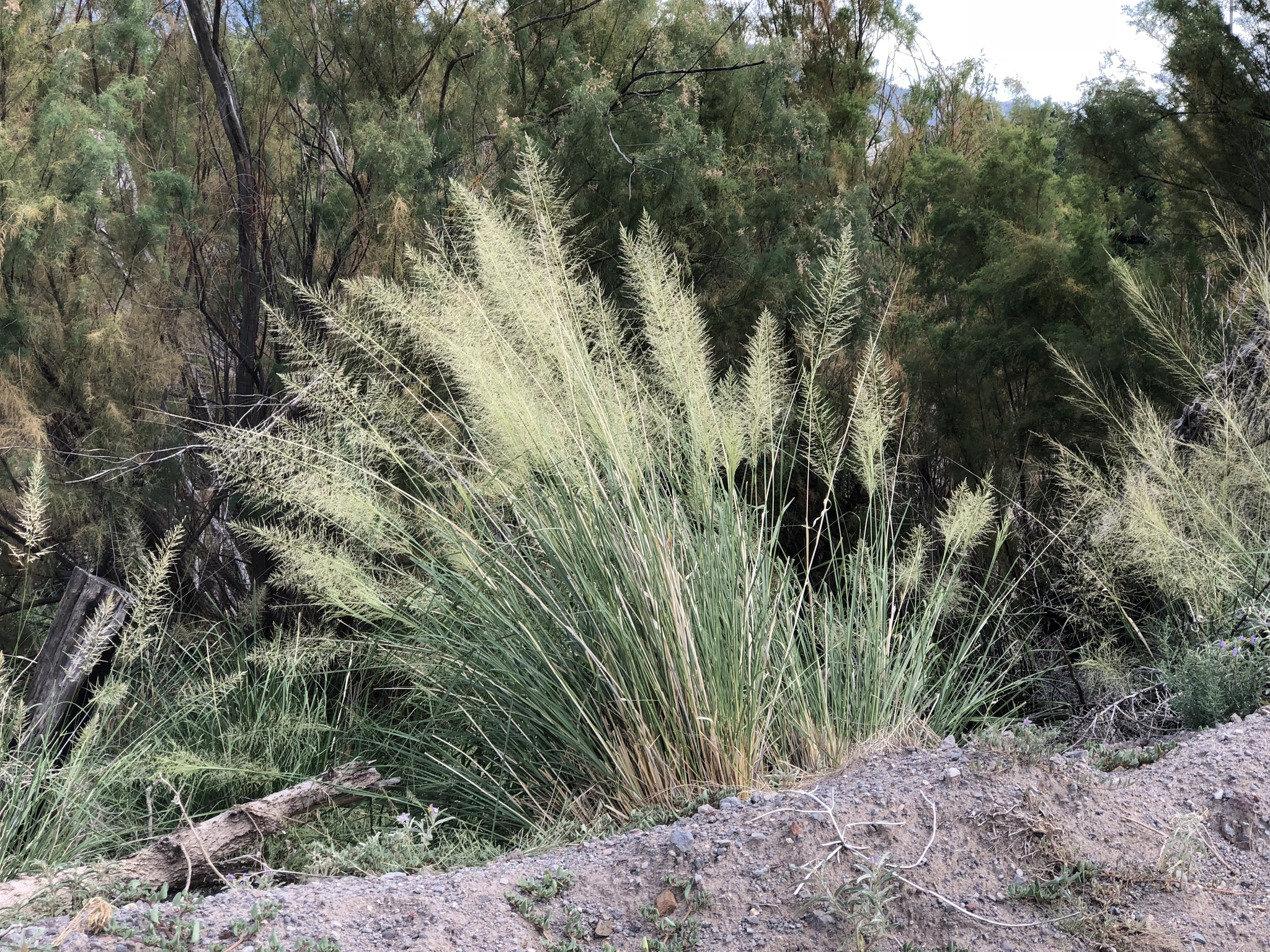
- Sporobolus wrightii in Three Rivers Petroglyph Site, Tularosa, New Mexico, USA (2018)

Conservation status
- Secure (NatureServe)

Scientific classification
- Kingdom: Plantae
- Clade: Embryophytes
- Clade: Tracheophytes
- Clade: Spermatophytes
- Clade: Angiosperms
- Clade: Monocots
- Clade: Commelinids
- Order: Poales
- Family: Poaceae
- Subfamily: Chloridoideae
- Genus: Sporobolus
- Species: S. wrightii

Binomial name
- Sporobolus wrightii Munro ex Scribn.

Synonyms
- Sporobolus airoides var. wrightii (Munro ex Scribn.) Gould

= Sporobolus wrightii =

Species of grass

Sporobolus wrightii is a species of grass known by the common names big sacaton and giant sacaton. It is native to the western United States and northern and central Mexico.

== Description ==
This species is a perennial bunchgrass with thick stems that can reach 2.5 metres tall. The leaves are 20 to 70 centimetres long. The panicle is lance-shaped in outline and up to 60 centimetres long. It contains purplish or greenish spikelets.

== Ecology ==
This plant grows in plains and desert grassland, shrubsteppe, and desert shrubland habitat. It may occur in desert wetland habitat types such as desert marshes, seasonal lakes, and floodplains. In this kind of habitat it is an important species for preventing erosion and slowing runoff by trapping sediments. It may be a common to prominent or dominant species. It dominates some grasslands in its native range, alongside other common grasses. This type of grassland has been reduced to a fraction of its pristine range by forces such as overgrazing and the channelization of water.

This grass provides a good forage for livestock, producing large amounts of green matter. It is an important species for grazers on grasslands in parts of Arizona. It is also valuable for wildlife.
