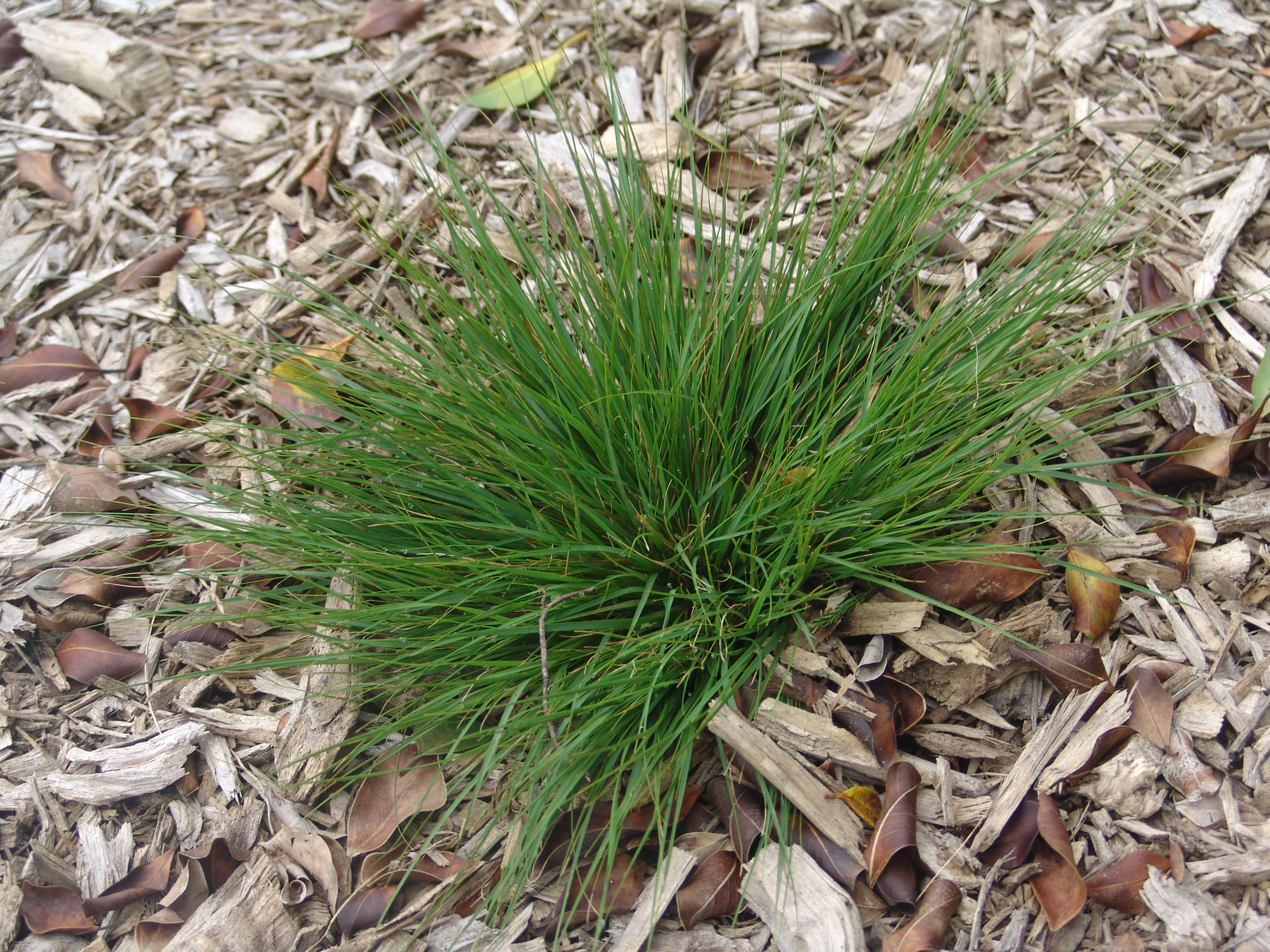

Conservation status
- Critically Endangered (IUCN 3.1)

Scientific classification
- Kingdom: Plantae
- Clade: Tracheophytes
- Clade: Angiosperms
- Clade: Monocots
- Clade: Commelinids
- Order: Poales
- Family: Poaceae
- Subfamily: Chloridoideae
- Genus: Sporobolus
- Species: S. caespitosus

Binomial name
- Sporobolus caespitosus Kunth

= Sporobolus caespitosus =

Species of grass

Sporobolus caespitosus, commonly known as Ascension hedgehog grass, is a species of grass in the family Poaceae. It is endemic to Ascension Island, in the South Atlantic Ocean, where it is known only from the weather side of the Green Mountain area, where it occupies an area of less than 0.5 km^{2}. It inhabits the vertical and sloping cinder banks of Green Mountain where very few other species are present, and seems to be adapted to the exposed conditions found at these sites. It is threatened by introduced vegetation and habitat loss.
