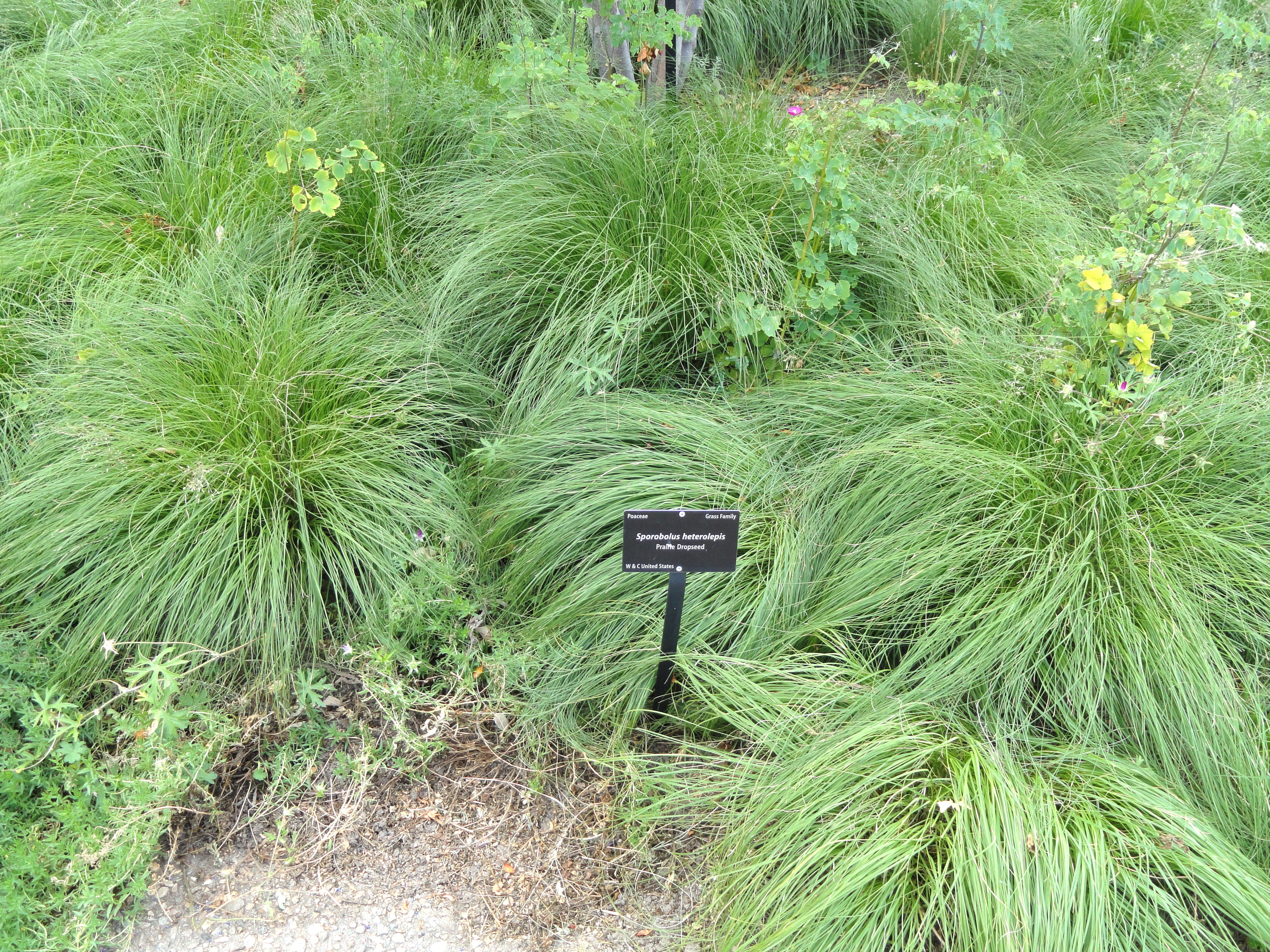

Conservation status
- Secure (NatureServe)

Scientific classification
- Kingdom: Plantae
- Clade: Tracheophytes
- Clade: Angiosperms
- Clade: Monocots
- Clade: Commelinids
- Order: Poales
- Family: Poaceae
- Subfamily: Chloridoideae
- Genus: Sporobolus
- Species: S. heterolepis

Binomial name
- Sporobolus heterolepis A.Gray

= Sporobolus heterolepis =

Prairie dropseed

Species of flowering plant

Sporobolus heterolepis, commonly known as prairie dropseed, is a species of prairie grass native to the tallgrass and mixed grass prairies of central North America from Texas to southern Canada. It is also found further east, to the Atlantic coast of the United States and Canada, but is much less common beyond the Great Plains and is restricted to specialized habitats. It is found in 27 states and four Canadian provinces.

== Description ==
Prairie dropseed is a perennial bunchgrass whose mound of leaves is typically from 1 to 2 ft (30 to 60 cm) high and 2 to 3 ft (60 to 90 cm) across. Its flowering stems (culms) grow from 1 1/2 to 3 ft (45 to 90 cm) tall, extending above the leaves.

The flower cluster is an airy panicle 3 to 8 in (8 to 20 cm) long with many branches. They terminate in small spikelets, which each contain a single fertile floret. When it blooms, the floret has three reddish anthers and a short feathery stigma. If it is pollinated, the floret produces a nearly round seed 1.5 to 2.0 mm (0.06 to 0.08 in) long.

At the base of the spikelet are two bracts (glumes), one of them 4 to 6 mm (0.16 to 0.24 in) long and the other 2 to 4 mm (0.08 to 0.16 in) long. The bracts each are long and tapered, with sharply pointed tips. Around the floret are a lemma and palea, each about 3.5 to 5.5 mm (0.14 to 0.22 in) long, though the palea is sometimes longer than the lemma.

Prairie dropseed is a fine-textured grass with long, narrow leaves that arch outward, forming attractive, round tufts. The leaves range in color from a rich green hue in summer to a golden rust color in the fall. Foliage is resilient enough to resist flattening by snow, so it provides year-round interest. From late July to mid-September, the grass blooms with rusty-tan flowers that rise 30 to 36 in (760 to 910 mm) in height.

== Ecology ==
Prairie dropseed is a plant which typically only thrives in established prairie ecosystems, and does not easily establish when planted from seeds early in prairie restoration attempts. Once established, it is fairly hardy, being able to tolerate brief periods of drought, water inundation, and juglone toxicity from close proximity to black walnut trees. This plant is known to be an important part of the diet of several lepidopteran species. While prairie dropseed often fails to establish in natural prairie ecosystems due to its slow growth, studies investigating its growth under controlled conditions have found that it favors warmer temperatures and moist soil for germination.
