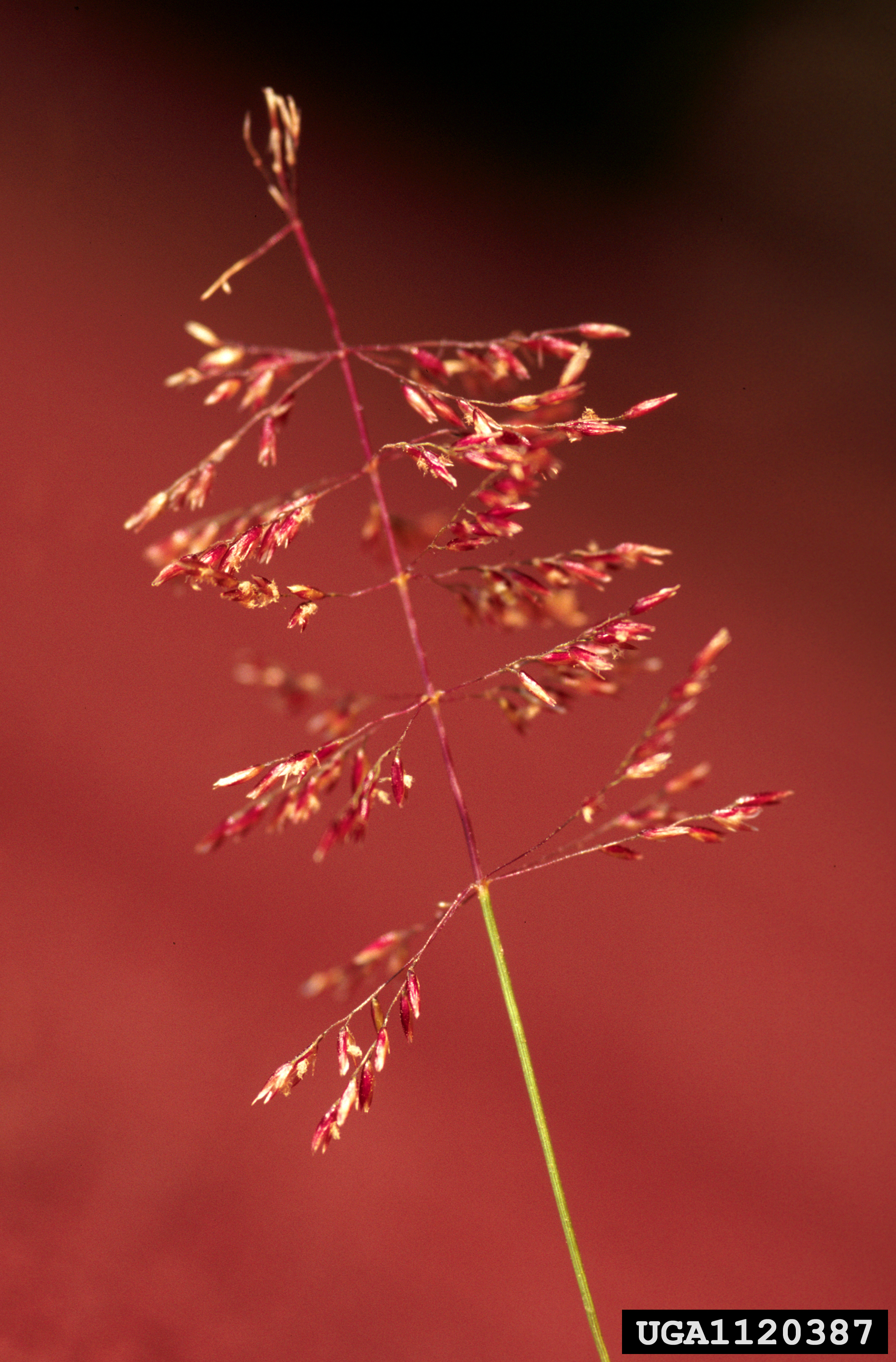

Conservation status
- Secure (NatureServe)

Scientific classification
- Kingdom: Plantae
- Clade: Tracheophytes
- Clade: Angiosperms
- Clade: Monocots
- Clade: Commelinids
- Order: Poales
- Family: Poaceae
- Subfamily: Chloridoideae
- Genus: Sporobolus
- Species: S. junceus

Binomial name
- Sporobolus junceus (P.Beauv.) Kunth

= Sporobolus junceus =

Species of grass

Sporobolus junceus is a species of grass known by the common name pineywoods dropseed. It is native to the southern United States.

This perennial bunchgrass has stems up to a meter tall. The leaves are up to 30 centimeters long and are flat or rolled. They are blue-green in color. The panicle is pyramidal in shape with spreading branches. They are lined with purplish or reddish spikelets.

S. junceus may be found in habitats such as pine or scrub barrens, open pinelands, or open oak woods.

This grass species is sometimes grazed by livestock, but it is not one of the more palatable grasses. It increases in abundance as the better grasses are consumed, and it indicates a pasture that is declining in quality.
