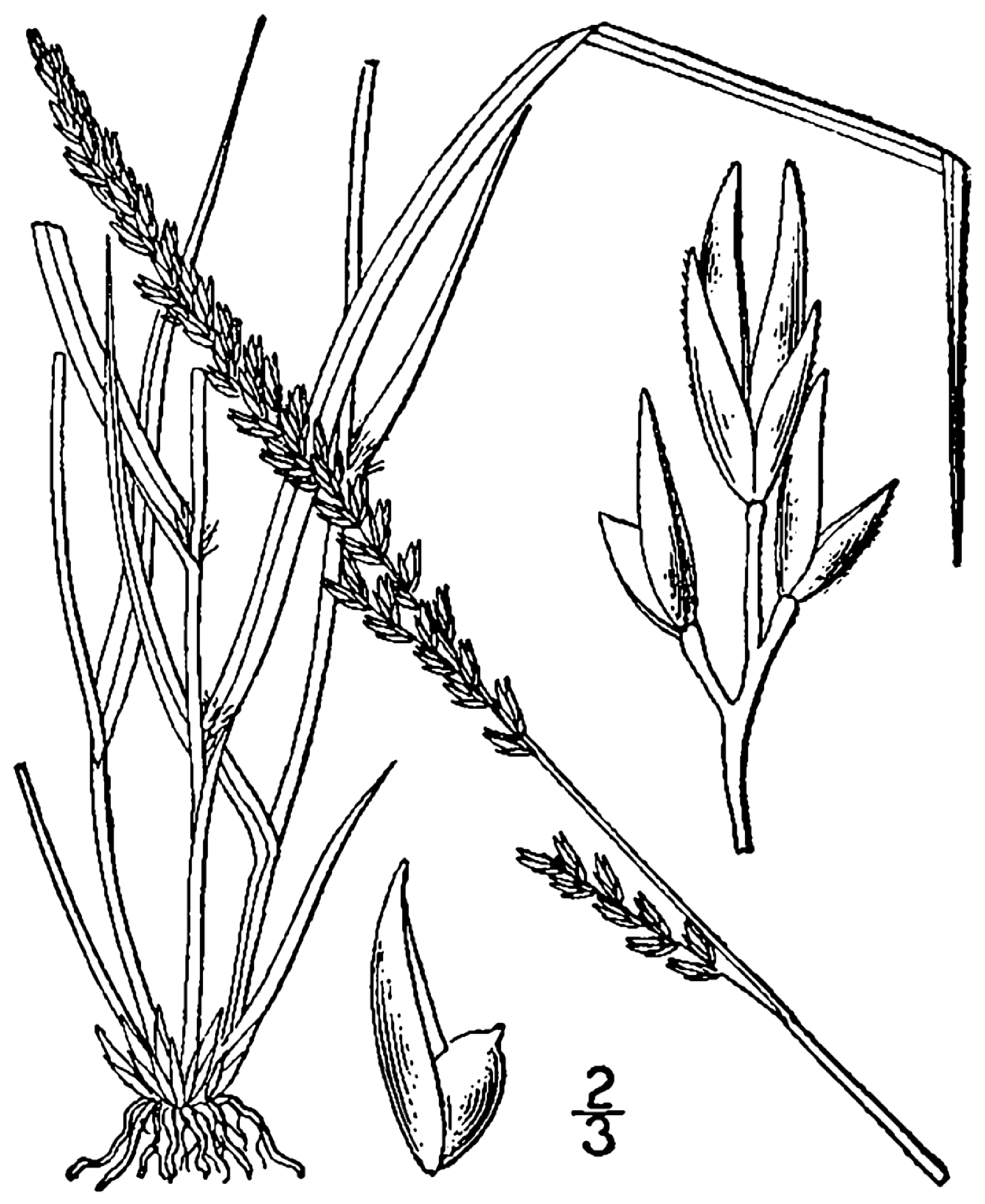
- 1913 illustration S. compositus var. compositus

Conservation status
- Secure (NatureServe)

Scientific classification
- Kingdom: Plantae
- Clade: Embryophytes
- Clade: Tracheophytes
- Clade: Spermatophytes
- Clade: Angiosperms
- Clade: Monocots
- Clade: Commelinids
- Order: Poales
- Family: Poaceae
- Subfamily: Chloridoideae
- Genus: Sporobolus
- Species: S. compositus

Binomial name
- Sporobolus compositus (Poir.) Merr.

Synonyms
- List: Agrostis composita Poir.; Vilfa composita (Poir.) P.Beauv.; Agrostis aspera Michx.; Agrostis involuta Muhl.; Agrostis longifolia (Torr.) Torr. ex A.Gray; Agrostis polystachya Bosc ex Steud.; Apera aspera P.Beauv.; Glyceria stricta Buckley; Muhlenbergia aspera Kunth; Muhlenbergia composita Trin. ex Steud.; Sporobolus asper (P.Beauv.) Kunth; Sporobolus asper var. drummondii (Trin.) Vasey; Sporobolus asper var. hookeri (Trin.) Vasey; Sporobolus asper var. pilosus (Vasey) Hitchc.; Sporobolus attenuatus Nash; Sporobolus compositus var. drummondii (Trin.) Kartesz & Gandhi; Sporobolus drummondii (Trin.) Vasey; Sporobolus longifolius (Torr.) Alph.Wood; Sporobolus pilosus Vasey; Vilfa aspera P.Beauv.; Vilfa drummondii Trin.; Vilfa hookeri Trin.; Vilfa longifolia Torr.

= Sporobolus compositus =

Tall dropseed

Species of flowering plant

Sporobolus compositus, the composite dropseed or tall dropseed, is a native North American prairie grass growing from two to four feet tall. Also called rough dropseed and meadow dropseed, it is common on the Great Plains, and found in most states in the United States.

It flowers from August to September. The name derives from the readily falling grain. Dropseed has little value as food; its palatability decreases with its age.
