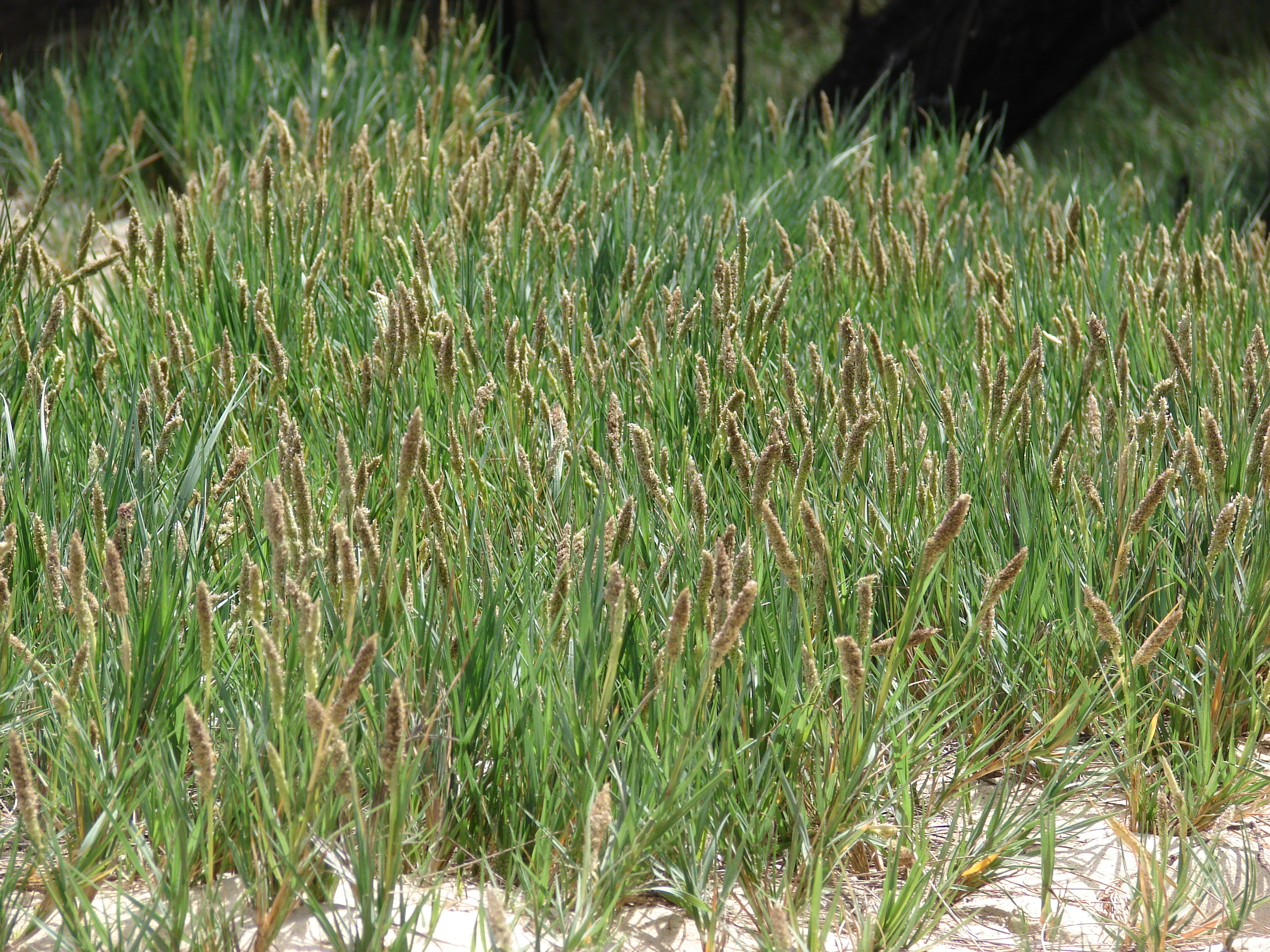
- Sporobolus virginicus

Scientific classification
- Kingdom: Plantae
- Clade: Tracheophytes
- Clade: Angiosperms
- Clade: Monocots
- Clade: Commelinids
- Order: Poales
- Family: Poaceae
- Subfamily: Chloridoideae
- Tribe: Zoysieae
- Subtribe: Sporobolinae
- Genus: Sporobolus; R.Br.

Type species
- Sporobolus indicus (L.) R.Br.

Synonyms
- Agrosticula Raddi; Bauchea E. Fourn.; Bennetia Raf.; Cryptostachys Steud.; Diachyrium Griseb.; Heleochloa Host ex Roem.; Spermachiton Llanos; Spermatochiton Pilg., alternate spelling; Thellungia Stapf; Triachyrum Hochst.

= Sporobolus =

Genus of grasses

Sporobolus is a nearly cosmopolitan genus of plants in the grass family. The name Sporobolus means "seed-thrower", and is derived from Ancient Greek word σπόρος (spóros), meaning "seed", and the root of βάλλειν (bállein) "to throw", referring to the dispersion of seeds. Members of the genus are usually called dropseeds or sacaton grasses. They are typical prairie and savanna plants, occurring in other types of open habitat in warmer climates. At least one species (S. caespitosus from Saint Helena) is threatened with extinction, and another (S. durus from Ascension Island) is extinct.

== Uses ==
While some dropseeds, such as prairie dropseed (Sporobolus heterolepis), make nice gardening plants, they are generally considered to make inferior pastures, but seeds of at least some species are edible and nutritious; they were used as food, for example, by the Chiricahua Apaches. Other species are reported to be used as famine foods, such as Sporobolus indicus in parts of the Oromia Region of Ethiopia, where it is known as muriy in Oromiffa.

Known as popote de cambray, Sporobolus grasses are used in popotillo art or straw mosaics, a Mexican folk art with pre-Columbian origins.

The 1889 book The Useful Native Plants of Australia records that Sporobolus actinocladus is a "Perennial; seeds in October and November. A much esteemed pasture grass of the back country, common on rich loamy soil; stock of all kinds are very fond of it."

== Ecology ==
Caterpillars of the small moth Bucculatrix sporobolella have only been found on alkali sacaton (Sporobolus airoides). The Laysan dropseed noctuid moth (Hypena laysanensis) on Laysan Island apparently became extinct with the local eradication of S. virginicus by feral rabbits. Seed-eating birds including American sparrows (genus Aimophila) feed on sacaton seeds. S. wrightii is a critical resource for Botteri's sparrow (Aimophila botterii) which at one time was extirpated from Arizona.

== Selected species ==
About 160 species are placed in the genus, including:

- Sporobolus airoides (Torr.) Torr. – alkali sacaton
- Sporobolus caespitosus Kunth
- Sporobolus caroli Mez – fairy grass, yakka grass
- Sporobolus compositus (Poir.) Merr. – composite dropseed, tall dropseed
- Sporobolus contractus Hitchc. – spike dropseed
- Sporobolus cryptandrus (Torr.) A.Gray – sand dropseed
- †Sporobolus durus Brongn. (extinct)
- Sporobolus fertilis (Steud.) Clayton
- Sporobolus flexuosus (Thurb. ex Vasey) Rydb. – mesa dropseed
- Sporobolus heterolepis (A.Gray) A.Gray – prairie dropseed
- Sporobolus indicus (L.) R.Br. – smut grass
- Sporobolus jacquemontii Kunth
- Sporobolus junceus (P. Beauv.) Kunth – pineywoods dropseed
- Sporobolus pyramidalis P.Beauv. – giant rat's-tail grass
- Sporobolus spicatus Kunth – salt grass
- Sporobolus texanus Vasey – Texas dropseed
- Sporobolus vaginiflorus (Torr. ex A.Gray) Alph.Wood – poverty dropseed, poverty grass, sheathed dropseed
- Sporobolus virginicus (L.) Kunth. – seashore dropseed, beach dropseed
- Sporobolus wrightii Munro ex Scribn. – big sacaton, giant sacaton

This list does not include numerous species moved from other genera to Sporobolus after a 2014 taxonomic revision, including species in Crypsis, Eragrostis, Thellungia, Calamovilfa, and Spartina.

Numerous species have been moved from Sporobolus to other genera: Agrostis, Arctagrostis, Eragrostis, Mosdenia, Muhlenbergia, Poa, Sacciolepis, Thysanolaena, and Urochondra.

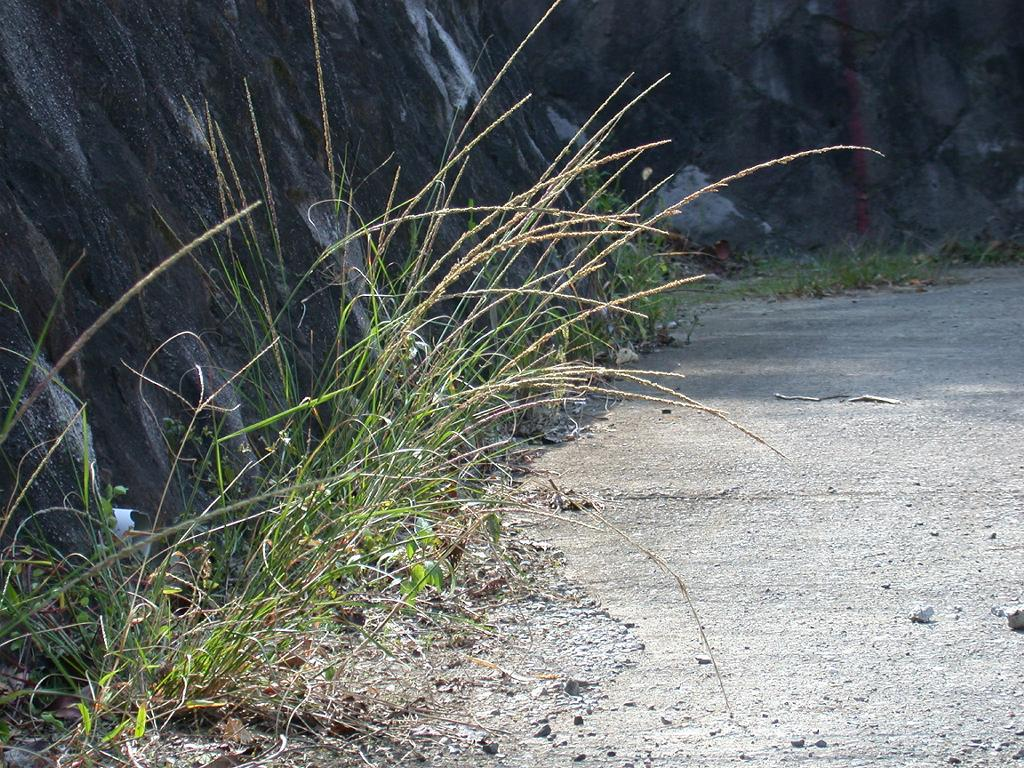
Giant parramatta grass (Sporobolus fertilis)

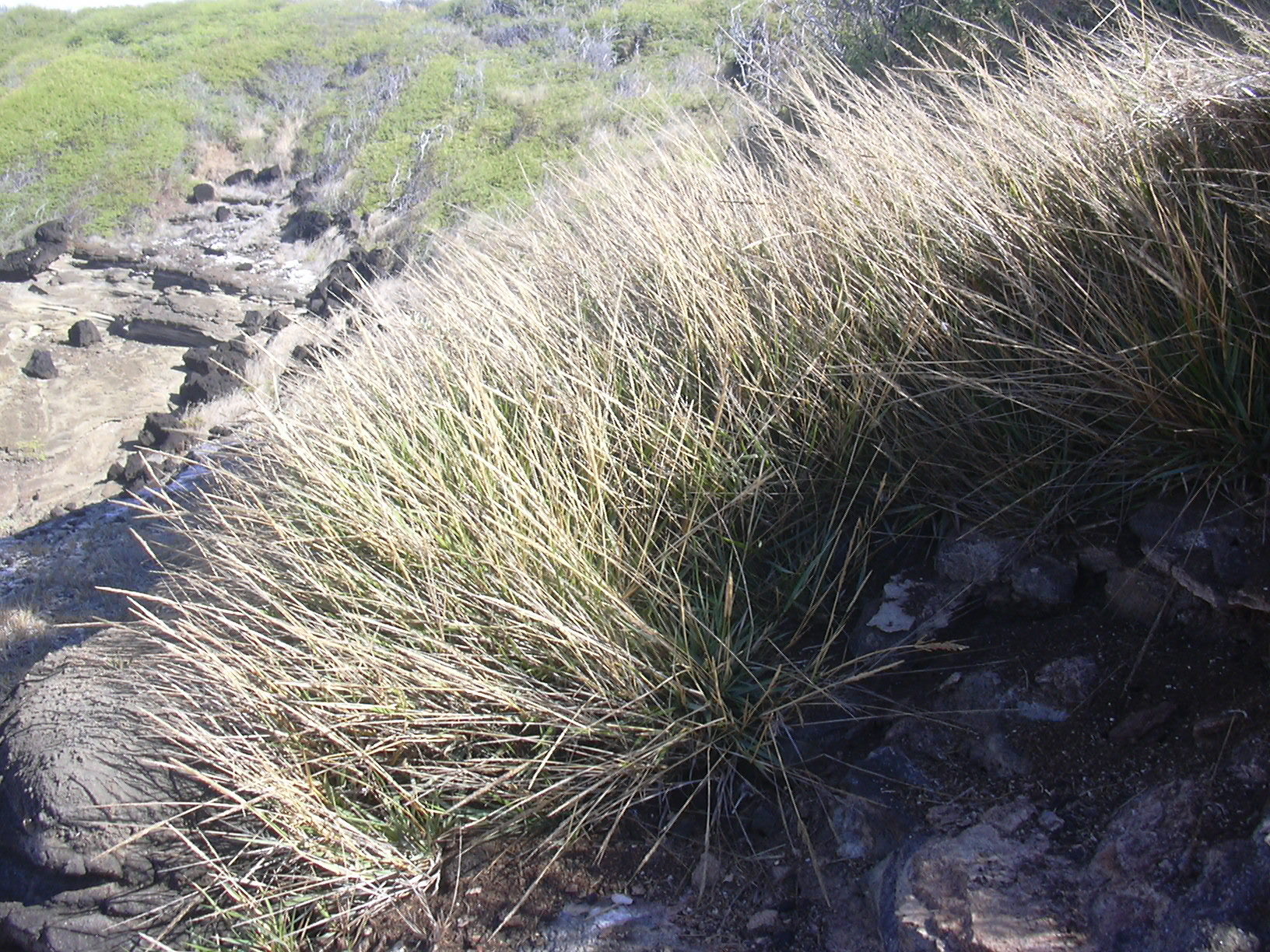
Madagascar dropseed (Sporobolus pyramidatus)
