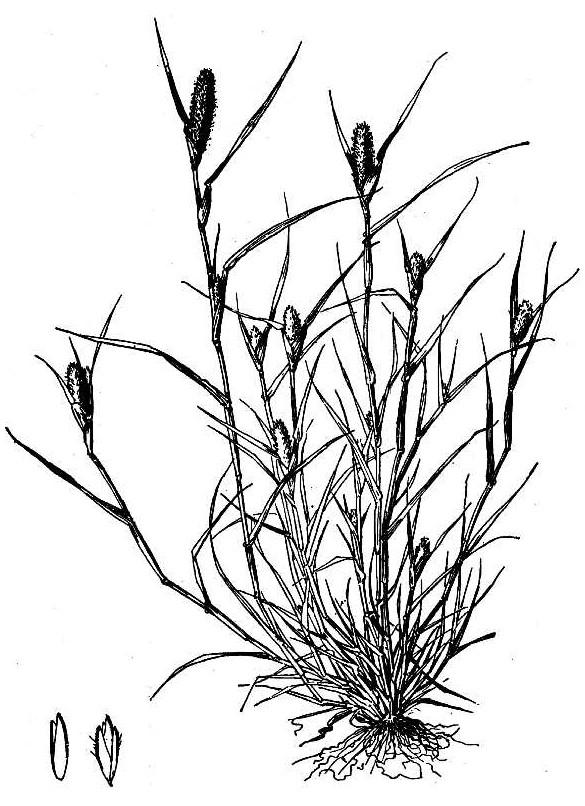
- Crypsis alopecuroides

Scientific classification
- Kingdom: Plantae
- Clade: Embryophytes
- Clade: Tracheophytes
- Clade: Angiosperms
- Clade: Monocots
- Clade: Commelinids
- Order: Poales
- Family: Poaceae
- Subfamily: Chloridoideae
- Genus: Crypsis; Ait.

Type species
- Crypsis aculeata (L.) Ait.

Species
- See text

Synonyms
- Pallasia Scop. 1777, rejected name not L.f. 1782 nor L'Hér. ex Aiton 1789 nor Klotzsch 1853; Antitragus Gaertn.; Raddia Mazziari 1834, illegitimate homonym not Bertol. 1819 nor DC. 1824; Ceytosis Munro; Torgesia Bornm.

= Crypsis (genus) =

Pricklegrass

Genus of grasses

Crypsis is a genus of African and Eurasian plants in the grass family, sometimes referred to as pricklegrass. These are annual grasses with short leaves. A few species are invasive weeds outside their native ranges.

== Taxonomy ==
=== Accepted species ===
The following species belong in the genus Crypsis, according to contemporary taxonomic treatments:

- Crypsis aculeata – from Portugal and Mauritania to Korea
- Crypsis acuminata – from Turkey to Kazakhstan
- Crypsis alopecuroides – from Portugal and Morocco to Korea; introduced in western North America (British Columbia + western USA)
- Crypsis factorovskyi – Caucasus, Turkey, Cyprus, Syria, Lebanon, Palestine, Jordan
- Crypsis hadjikyriakou – Cyprus
- Crypsis minuartioides – Sharon Plain in northwestern Israel
- Crypsis schoenoides – from Britain to China + Pakistan + Mozambique; introduced in North America (western USA, Great Lakes region, Baja California)
- Crypsis turkestanica – Central Asia, western Siberia, Caucasus, southern European Russia
- Crypsis vaginiflora – Africa; Middle East, India, Pakistan; introduced in North America (Idaho, Oregon, California, Baja California)

=== Former species ===
The following species were formerly included in the genus Crypsis, but have since been combined into other genera (Muhlenbergia, Munroa, Phleum, Rhizocephalus, Sporobolus, Urochondra):

- Crypsis arenaria – Phleum arenarium
- Crypsis dura – Urochondra setulosa
- Crypsis juncea – Sporobolus junceus
- Crypsis macroura – Muhlenbergia macroura
- Crypsis maritima – Sporobolus virginicus
- Crypsis myosurus – Sporobolus spicatus
- Crypsis phleoides – Muhlenbergia angustata
- Crypsis pygmaea – Rhizocephalus orientalis
- Crypsis setifolia – Muhlenbergia macroura
- Crypsis setulosa – Urochondra setulosa
- Crypsis squarrosa – Munroa squarrosa
- Crypsis stricta – Muhlenbergia angustata
- Crypsis virginica – Sporobolus virginicus
