= Zoysia 'Emerald' =

Grass cultivar

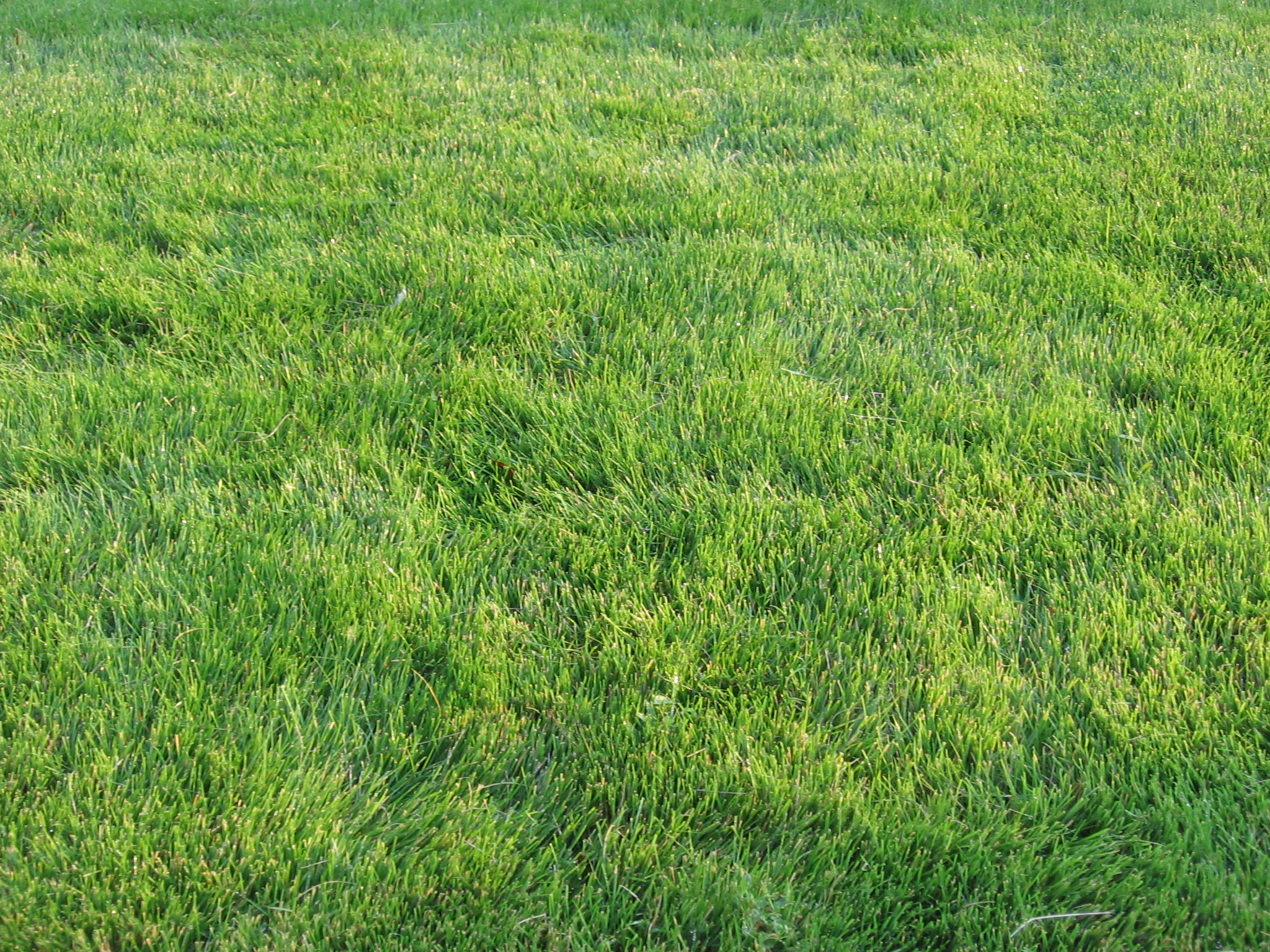
- Genus: Zoysia
- Hybrid parentage: Zoysia japonica × Zoysia matrella
- Cultivar: 'Emerald'
- Origin: Tifton, Georgia, United States; 1955

Emerald Zoysia (Zoysia 'Emerald') is a cultivar of Zoysia grass with a thin bladed leaf that forms a very lush lawn. It shares the drought and shade resistance of the other varieties.

This grass has a fine, soft texture and can be left unmown as it only grows to a height of 6–12 inches (15–30 cm). When left unmown, it forms a humpy convoluted surface which is sometimes used in oriental landscapes (see picture on Zoysia page).

== Adaptation and characteristics ==
Emerald Zoysia is adapted to zones 7-11 and does well in warm, humid environments. It is an excellent grass for the southern and southeastern states. Once established it requires less water than St. Augustine but slightly more than Bermuda. It is drought tolerant due to its deep root structure. Browning may occur in triple digit heat, but adequate hydration can restore its vibrant green color in a matter of minutes. The grass is moderately shade tolerant, coming close to the shade tolerance of St. Augustine. However, it does not do well in full shade as compared to Rye and Fescue. An average of at least 3–4 hours of full sun per day is a good measure for healthy growth. Flooding is tolerated, but constant saturation will eventually weaken the grass. This zoysia has a moderate cold tolerance and can be damaged by hard freezes and is not hardy in transition zones. Emerald Zoysia is a very slow growing lawn grass. Zoysia grasses are generally slower growing than Bermuda and St. Augustine, with Emerald Zoysia being one of the slowest growing Zoysia grasses. The grass exhibits a dense creeping growth, rather than an aggressive upward, or sprawling growth. The blade density is much higher than for other grasses, giving a very dense, carpet-like, or "hedgehog" appearance.

== Care and maintenance ==
Due to the density of the grass, excess thatch can accumulate and should be removed every several weeks. Mowing can be performed every 7–10 days, with no more than 1/3 of the blade cut at one time. Recommended mowing height of this grass is between .75 and 2 inches (1.9 and 5.1 cm). Mowing the grass shorter than this height can produce a weaker less attractive product, whereas mowing the grass higher than this height will promote a less-dense, wispy appearance. The use of reel mowers is suggested since common rotary lawn mowers will tear the fine-blade grass and leave a grey/white tip instead of a clean cut.

Emerald Zoysia has an adverse reaction to excessive fertilization, requiring no more than two light distributions per year. 8-8-8 or 13-13-13 fertilizer is recommended. If over fertilized, it will turn yellow and could die. Since regrowth of this grass is slow, its best to err on the light side of fertilization than to over fertilize.
