= Z. japonica =

Z. japonica may refer to:

- Zostera japonica, a seagrass species in the genus Zostera
- Zoysia japonica, a creeping grass species in the genus Zoysia native to southeastern and eastern Asia

== Synonyms ==
- Zelkova japonica var. verschaffeltii, a synonym for Zelkova × verschaffeltii, the cut-leaf zelkova, a plant cultivar of hybrid origin
- Zosterops japonica, a synonym for Zosterops japonicus, the Japanese white-eye or mejiro, a small passerine bird species native to east Asia, including Japan, China, Vietnam and the Philippines

== See also ==
- Japonica (disambiguation)
