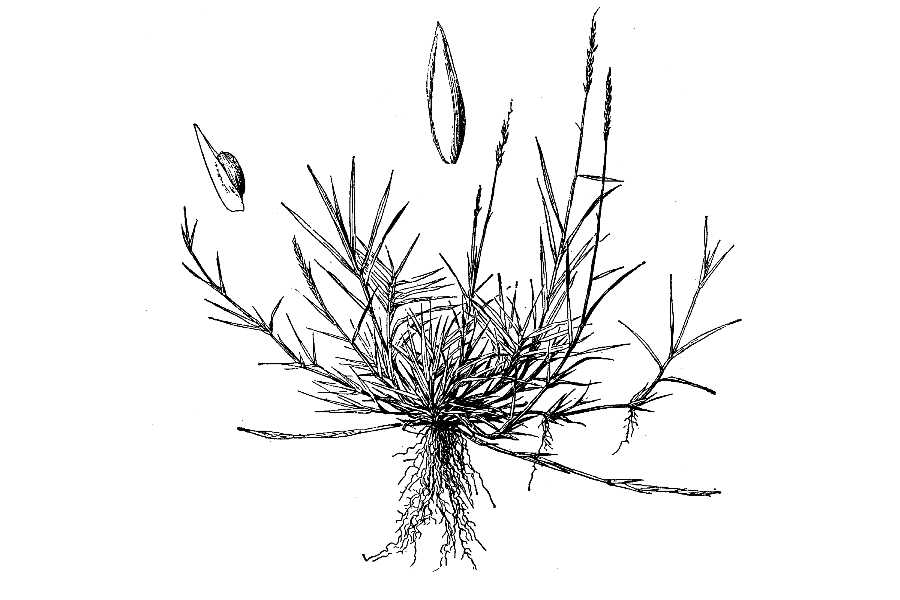
- Manila grass (Zoysia matrella)

Scientific classification
- Kingdom: Plantae
- Clade: Tracheophytes
- Clade: Angiosperms
- Clade: Monocots
- Clade: Commelinids
- Order: Poales
- Family: Poaceae
- Clade: PACMAD clade
- Subfamily: Chloridoideae
- Tribe: Zoysieae; Benth. (1881)

Genera
- Psilolemma; Sporobolus; Urochondra; Zoysia

Synonyms
- Spartineae Steele (1847); Sporoboleae Stapf (1898)

= Zoysieae =

Tribe of grasses

Zoysieae is a tribe of grasses in subfamily Chloridoideae, with around 250 species in four genera. All species use the C_{4} photosynthetic pathway.

The 4 genera are classified in these subtribes:

Sporobolinae Benth. (1881)
- Psilolemma
- Sporobolus (nom. cons., syn. Calamovilfa, Crypsis, Heleochloa, Spartina, Thellungia)
Zoysiinae Benth. (1878)
- Urochondra
- Zoysia
