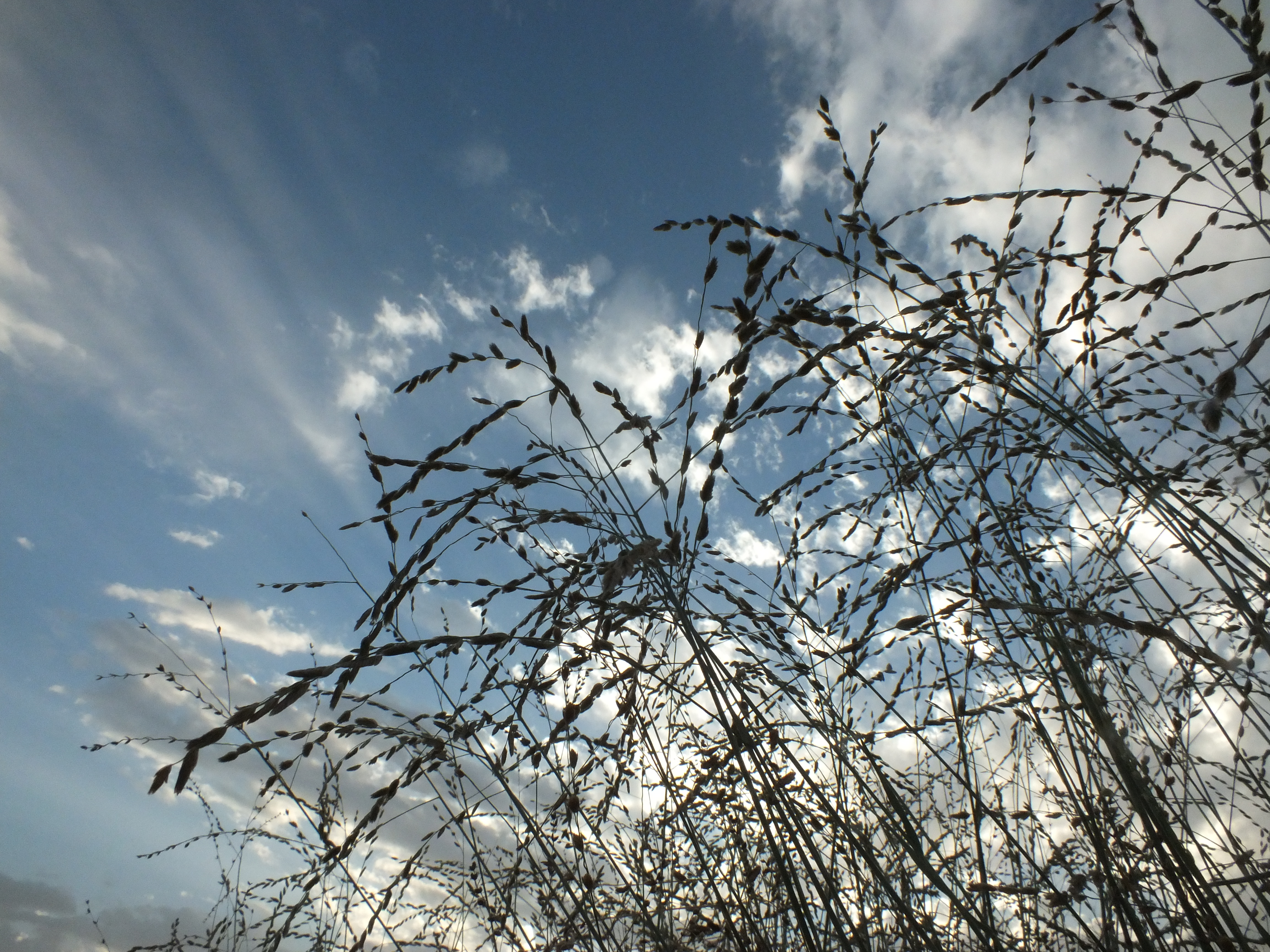
- Coelachyrum piercii

Scientific classification
- Kingdom: Plantae
- Clade: Embryophytes
- Clade: Tracheophytes
- Clade: Spermatophytes
- Clade: Angiosperms
- Clade: Monocots
- Clade: Commelinids
- Order: Poales
- Family: Poaceae
- Subfamily: Chloridoideae
- Tribe: Cynodonteae
- Subtribe: Eleusininae
- Genus: Coelachyrum; Hochst. & Nees

Type species
- Coelachyrum brevifolium Hochst. & Nees

Synonyms
- Apochiton C.E.Hubb.; Coelachyropsis Bor; Coelochloa Steud.; Cypholepis Chiov.

= Coelachyrum =

Genus of grasses

Coelachyrum is a genus of Asian and African plants in the grass family.

== Species ==
Six species are accepted.

- Coelachyrum brevifolium Hochst. & Nees - Algeria, Egypt, Mali, Mauritania, Niger, Nigeria, Chad, Sudan, Ethiopia, Eritrea, Somalia, Oman, Yemen, Saudi Arabia, Persian Gulf sheikdoms
- Coelachyrum burttii (C.E.Hubb.) P.M.Peterson – Tanzania
- Coelachyrum lagopoides (Burm.f.) Senaratna - India, Bangladesh, Sri Lanka
- Coelachyrum longiglume Napper - Somalia, Kenya Tanzania
- Coelachyrum piercei (Benth.) Bor - Somalia, Oman, Yemen, Saudi Arabia, Persian Gulf sheikdoms, Pakistan
- Coelachyrum poiflorum Chiov. - Djibouti, Eritrea, Ethiopia, Somalia, Oman, Yemen, Saudi Arabia,

formerly included

see Aeluropus Desmazeria

- Coelachyrum annuum - Desmazeria philistaea
- Coelachyrum indicum - Aeluropus lagopoides
- Coelachyrum yemenicum - Disakisperma yemenicum
