= Gelora Bung Tomo Stadium =

Sports venue in Surabaya, Indonesia

- Stadion Gelora Bung Tomo
- GBT
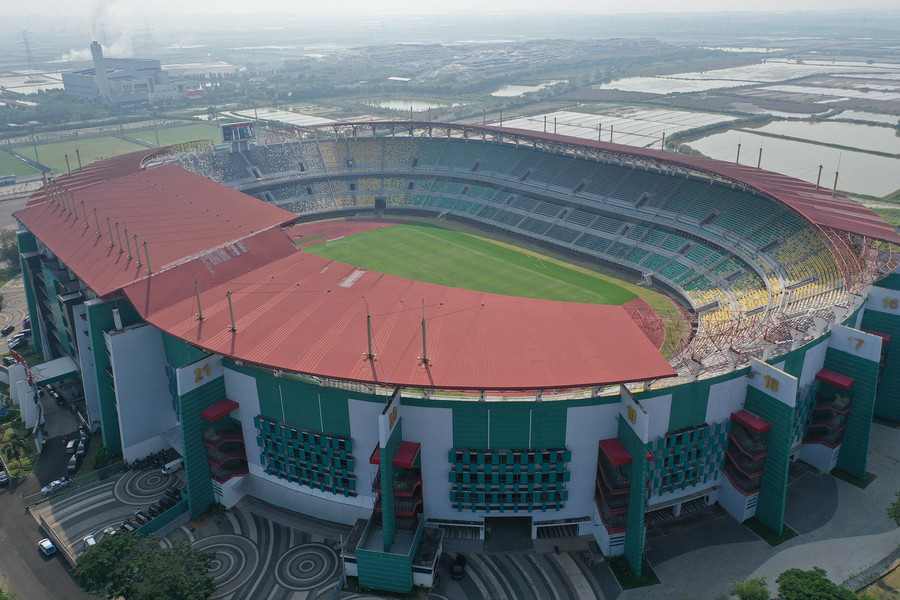
- The stadium in 2023

- Location in Surabaya
- Location: Benowo, Surabaya, East Java, Indonesia
- Coordinates: 7°13′23.8″S 112°37′21.8″E
- Owner: Government of Surabaya
- Capacity: 46,806 Capacity history: 55,000 (2010–2020) 46,806 (2020–present)
- Surface: Zoysia japonica
- Public transit: Benowo; Wirawiri Suroboyo feeder: Stadion GBT

Construction
- Groundbreaking: 2008
- Built: 2008–2010
- Opened: 6 August 2010; 16 years ago
- Renovated: 2019–2020
- Cost: IDR500 billion (2008–2010); IDR100 billion (2019–2020)

Tenant
- Persebaya Surabaya (2012–present)

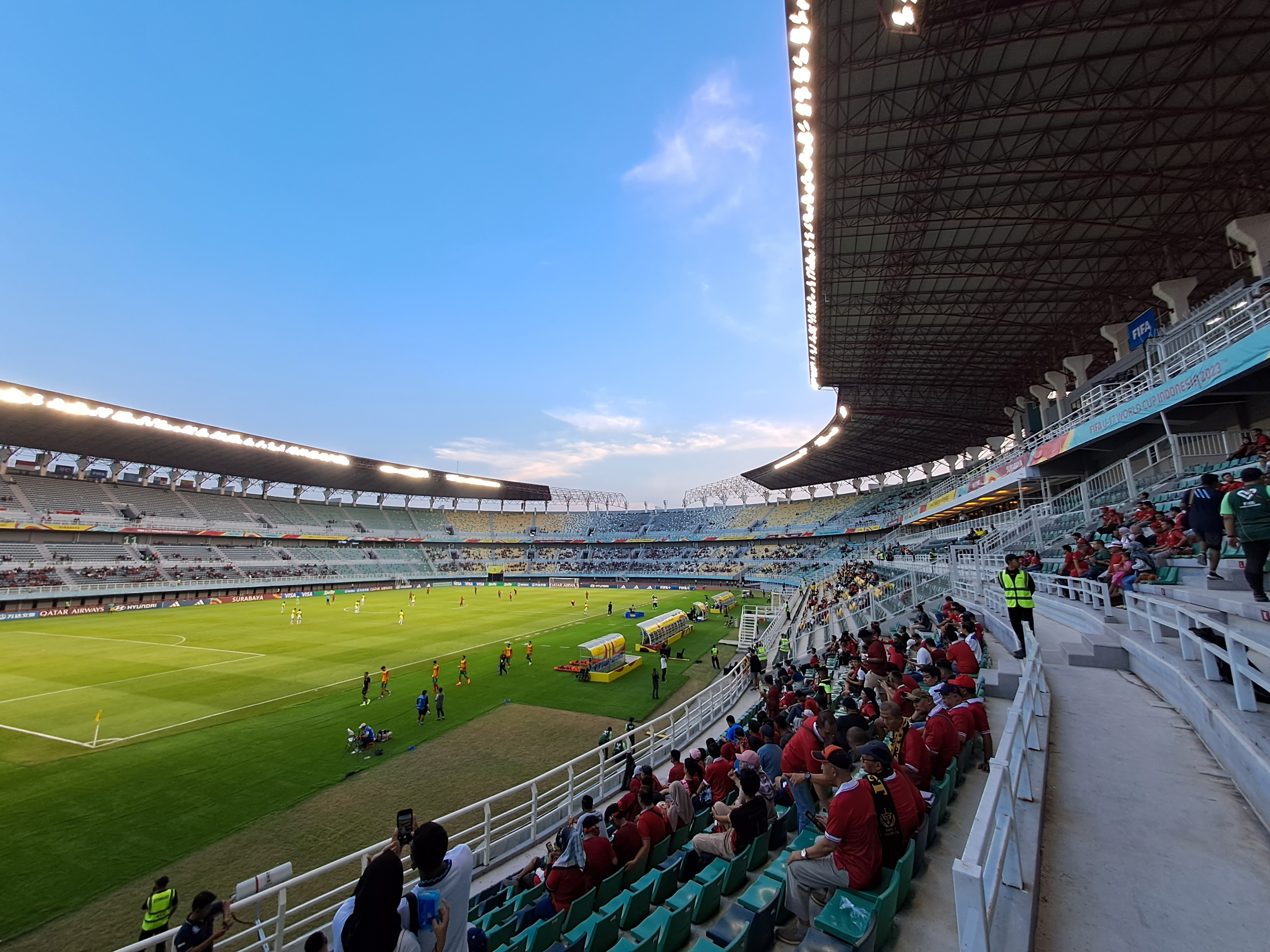
The stadium during the 2023 FIFA U-17 World Cup.

Gelora Bung Tomo Stadium is a multi-purpose stadium in Benowo, Surabaya, East Java, Indonesia. It is a part of the Surabaya Sports Center. The rest of the sports complex consists of an indoor stadium, a racing circuit, a roller skating track, three football training pitches, and a mosque. This stadium is used mostly for football matches. It replaced the older Gelora 10 November Stadium. The stadium is used for football matches and is a new base for Persebaya Surabaya. GBT can accommodate 46,806 spectators. The stadium is named after Bung Tomo, who is a National Hero of Indonesia.

== History ==
Groundbreaking occurred on 1 January 2008. Construction cost was estimated at Rp100 billion. The arena was designed by Malaysian architects KLIA. Stadion Gelora Bung Tomo was officially opened by President Susilo Bambang Yudhoyono on 11 August 2010.

== International football matches ==
Date	Competition	Team 1	Res.	Team 2
10 September 2012	2012 SCTV Cup	Indonesia	0–2	North Korea
15 September 2012	Friendly	Indonesia	0–0	Vietnam
14 June 2023	Friendly	Indonesia	0–0	Palestine
8 September 2023	Friendly	Indonesia	2–0	Turkmenistan
5 September 2025	Friendly	Indonesia	6–0	Chinese Taipei
8 September 2025	Friendly	Indonesia	0–0	Lebanon

=== 2023 FIFA U-17 World Cup ===
The stadium hosted eight matches during the 2023 FIFA U-17 World Cup, including all of Indonesia U-17 team group stage matches. The stadium capacity for the tournament was reduced to 44,200 seats.

Date	Team #1	Res.	Team #2	Round	Attendance
10 November 2023	Panama	0–2	Morocco	Group A	13,437
10 November 2023	Indonesia	1–1	Ecuador	Group A	30,583
13 November 2023	Morocco	0–2	Ecuador	Group A	5,498
13 November 2023	Indonesia	1–1	Panama	Group A	17,239
16 November 2023	Canada	1–5	Mali	Group B	10,269
16 November 2023	Morocco	3–1	Indonesia	Group A	26,454
21 November 2023	Mali	5–0	Mexico	Round of 16	7,034
21 November 2023	Morocco	1–1 (4–1 p)	Iran	Round of 16	1,552

== Renovations ==
To accommodate the stadium facilities for the 2021 FIFA U-20 World Cup, renovations are being done to the stadium. Including the installation of the scoreboard in the north upper tribune, repainting and repairing the facade, and adding seats to the stadium to make it a suitable all-seater stadium. The seats are arranged in a mosaic based in a green color representing the home team colors of Persebaya.

The Bung Tomo ornament and the stadium sign is already installed outside the Gelora Bung Tomo and also the floodlights (2400 lux) in December 2020. The first test of the new floodlights was in December, the second test of the new floodlights was increased at the brightness of 3500 lux. Three training fields are now finished. The floodlights were tested after the installation and the brightness is 800 lux, the second test in March 2021 was now in 1200 lux.

== Gallery ==
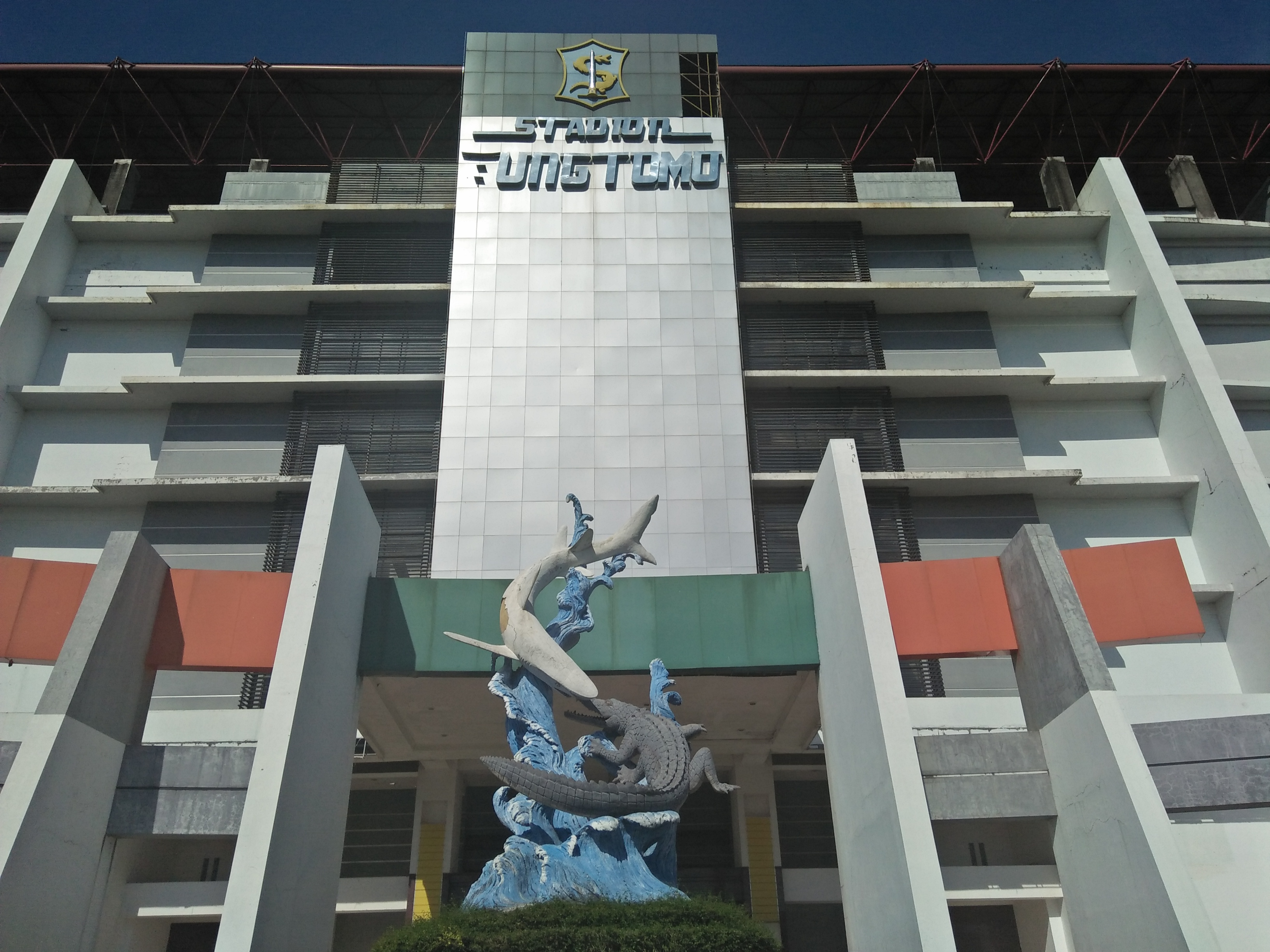
Front of GBT and statue of shark-crocodile

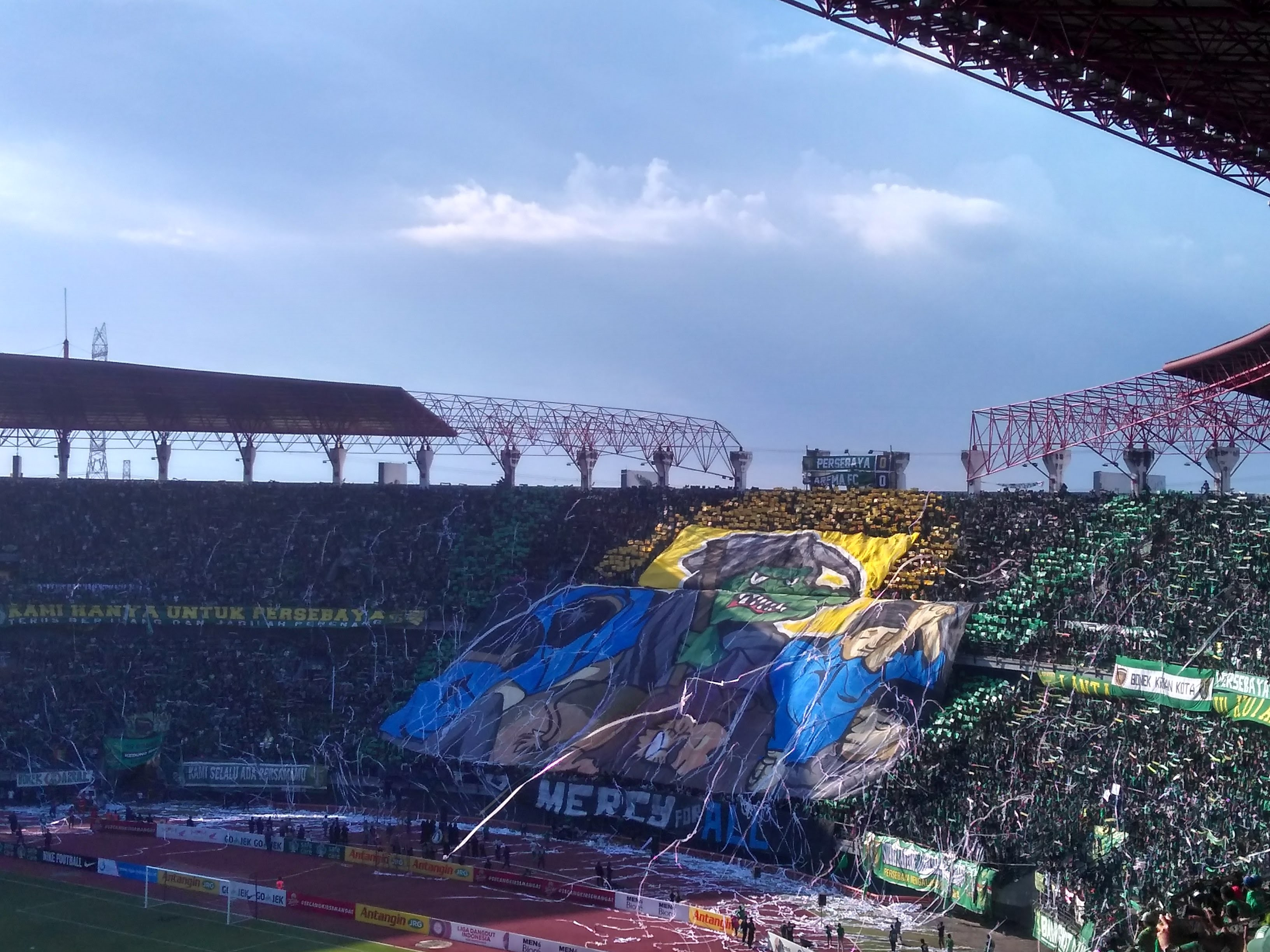
An ultras choreography of Persebaya during the match

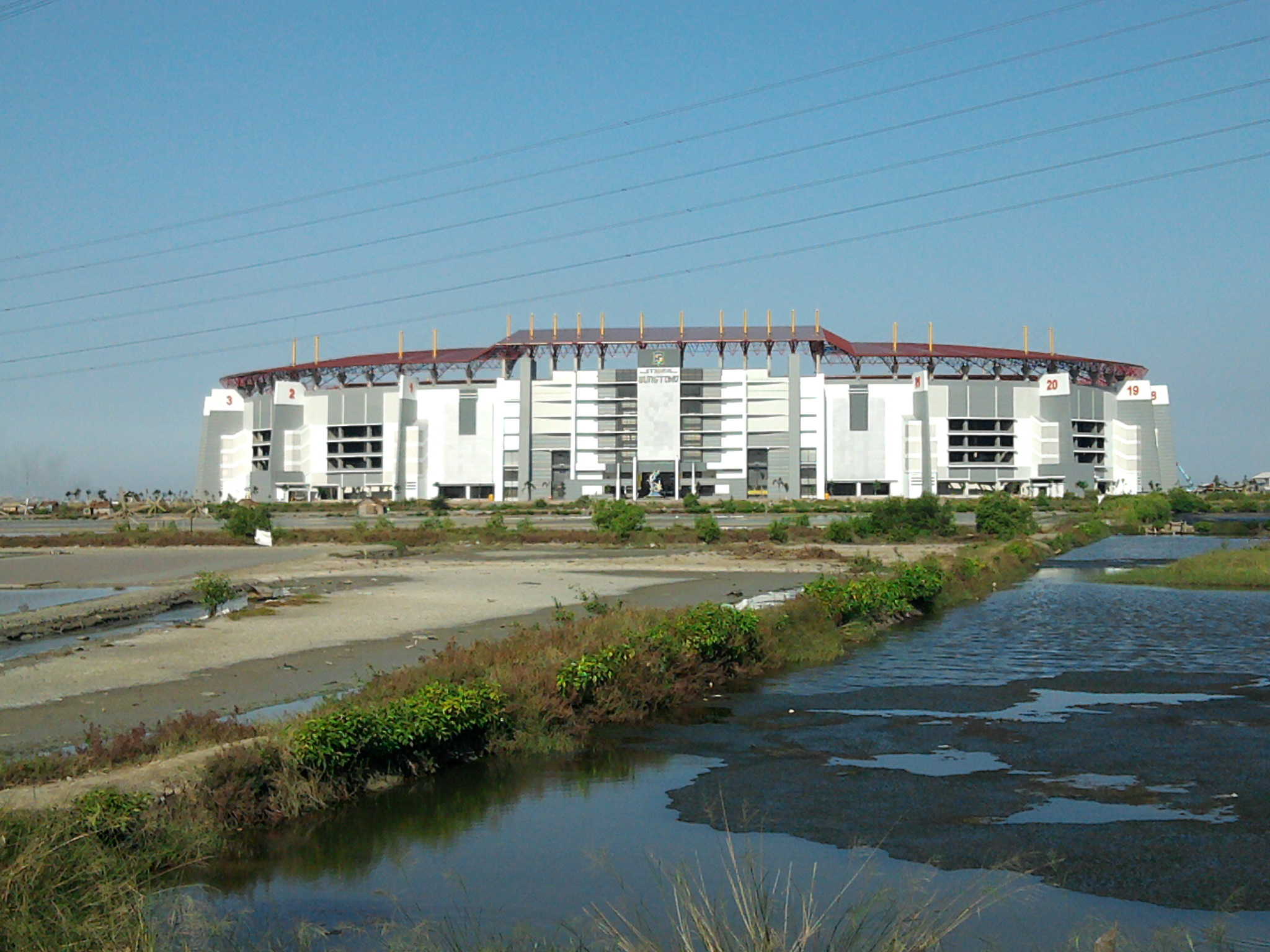
View of stadium from the salt ponds before renovation.
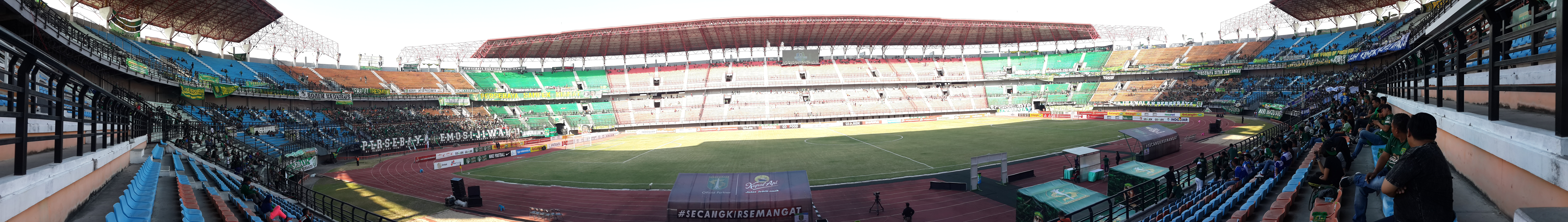
An inside panorama of Gelora Bung Tomo before renovation

== See also ==
- Persebaya
- List of stadiums in Indonesia
- List of stadiums by capacity
- List of stadiums
