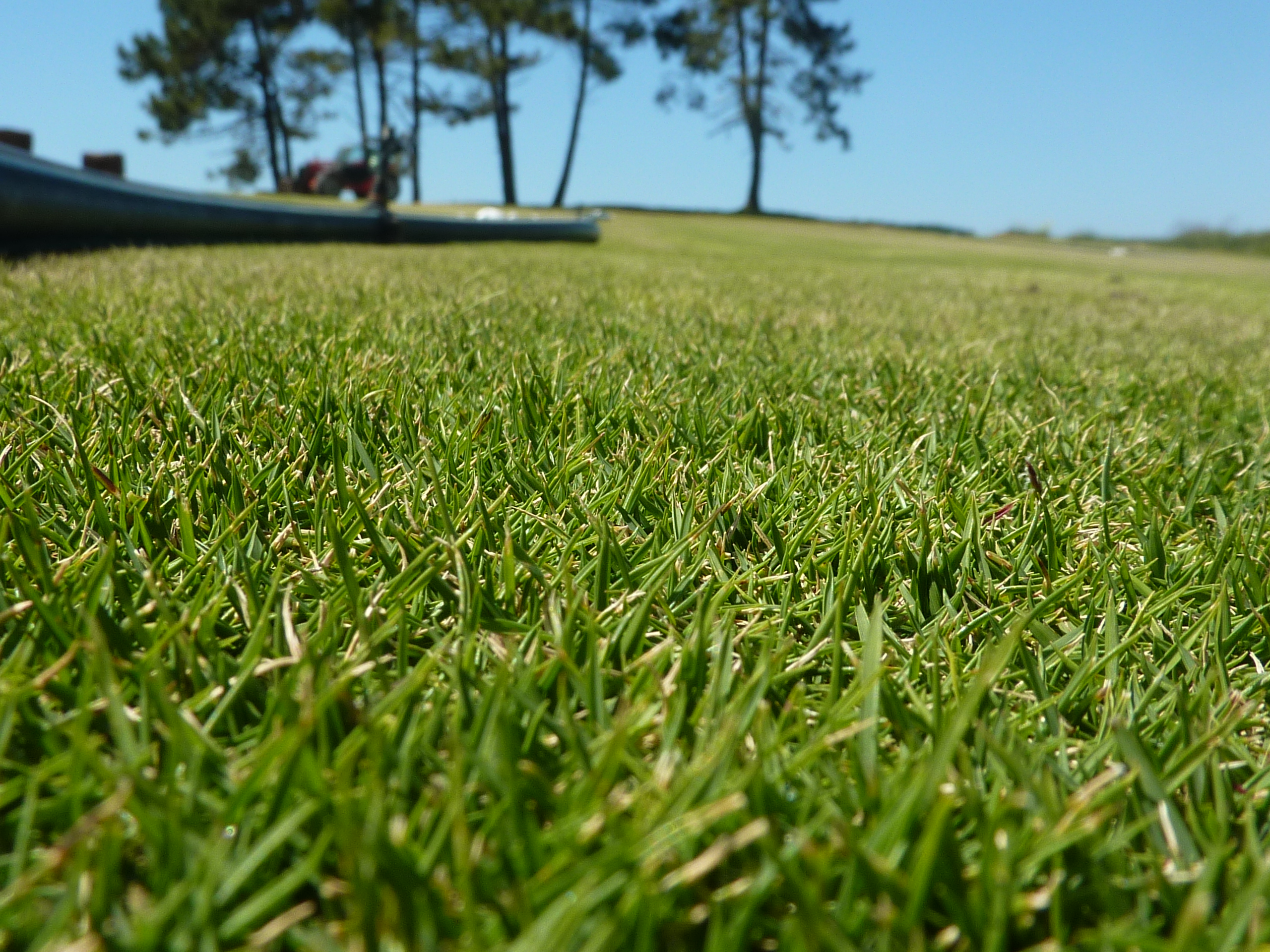

Scientific classification
- Kingdom: Plantae
- Clade: Tracheophytes
- Clade: Angiosperms
- Clade: Monocots
- Clade: Commelinids
- Order: Poales
- Family: Poaceae
- Subfamily: Chloridoideae
- Genus: Zoysia
- Species: Z. tenuifolia

Binomial name
- Zoysia tenuifolia Thiele

= Zoysia tenuifolia =

Species of grass

Zoysia tenuifolia is a type of grass originally thought to be one of the native grass type to the Mascarene Island. The epithet tenuifolia is commonly used to describe plant specimens in Mascarene Islands and Zoysia tenuifolia is also called Mascarene grass. Korean grass is another common name for this species. Z. tenuifolia is not widely used as a general lawn grass due to its slow growth rate and tendency to form clumps, although this species is commonly bred with Zoysia japonica to create popular hybrid zoysia cultivars, such as Emerald and Geo. It was once part of the diet of Cylindraspis tortoises before their extinction.

This grass may also be a subspecies of the commonly used lawn grass Manila grass, being referred to as Zoysia matrella var. pacifica.
