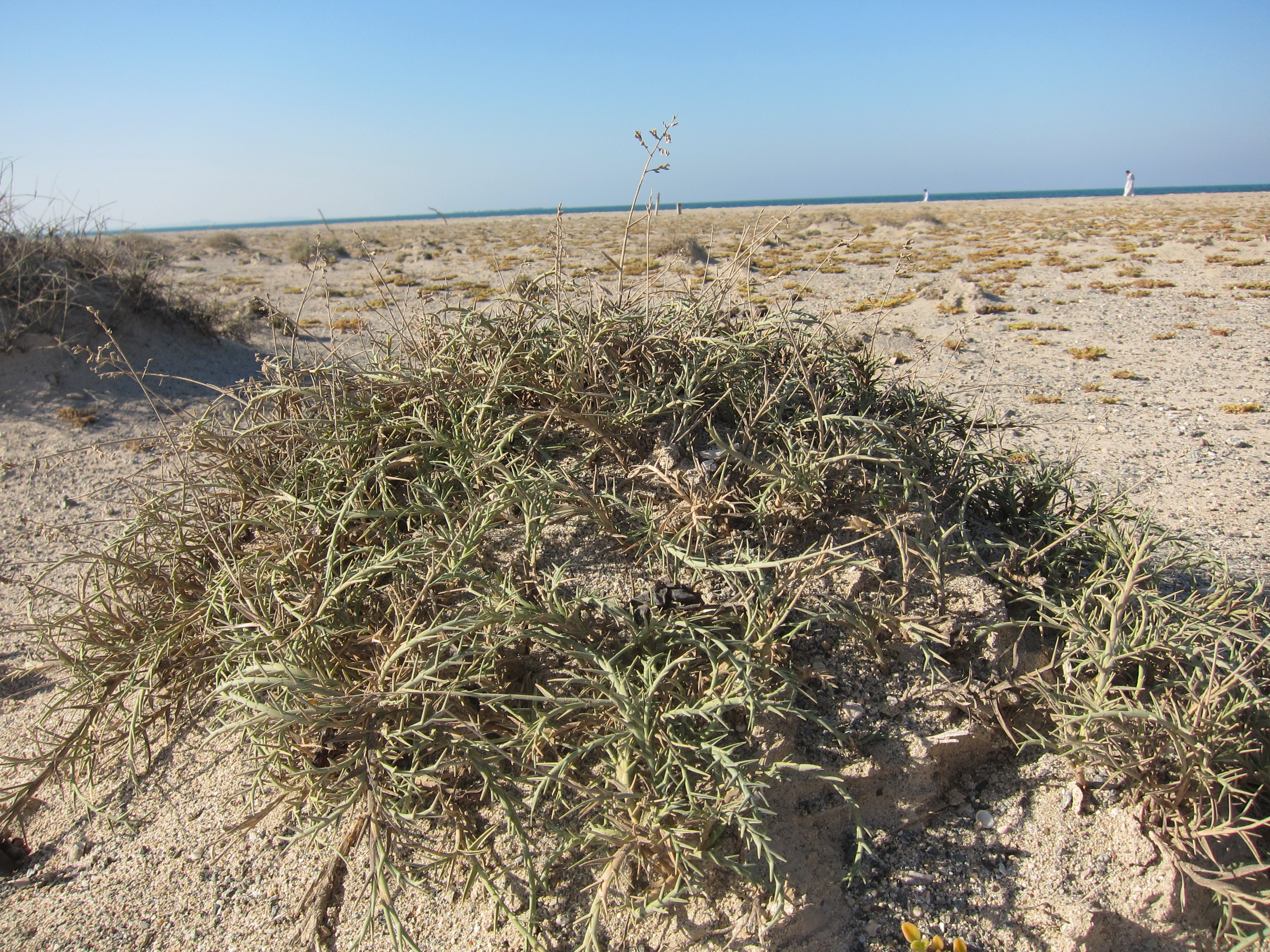
- Odyssea mucronata from Masirah Island, Omani territory in the Arabian Sea

Scientific classification
- Kingdom: Plantae
- Clade: Tracheophytes
- Clade: Angiosperms
- Clade: Monocots
- Clade: Commelinids
- Order: Poales
- Family: Poaceae
- Subfamily: Chloridoideae
- Tribe: Cynodonteae
- Subtribe: Aeluropodinae
- Genus: Odyssea; Stapf

Type species
- Odyssea paucinervis Stapf

= Odyssea =

Genus of grasses

Odyssea is a genus of African and Arabian plants in the grass family.

The genus is named after the ancient Greek tale "The Odyssey," in allusion to the long journey the type species has been taken through nine genera before settling in this one.

Species

- Odyssea mucronata (Forssk.) Stapf - Eritrea, Somalia, Yemen, possibly Saudi Arabia
- Odyssea paucinervis (Nees) Stapf - Zaire, Somalia, Tanzania, Angola, Zambia, Zimbabwe, Botswana, Cape Province, Namibia, Limpopo, Mpumalanga

formerly included

see Psilolemma

- Odyssea jaegeri - Psilolemma jaegeri
