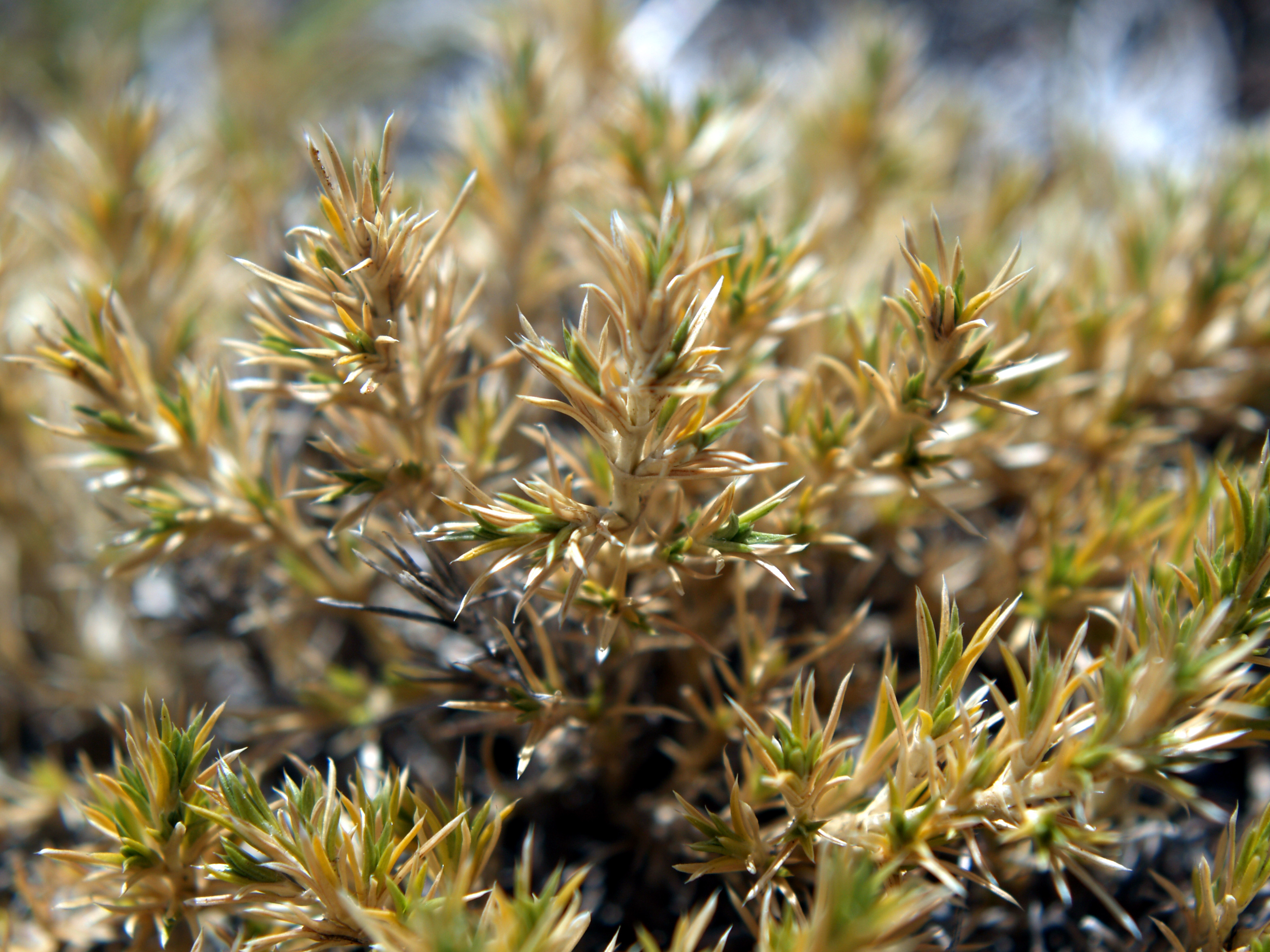
- Munroa squarrosa

Scientific classification
- Kingdom: Plantae
- Clade: Tracheophytes
- Clade: Angiosperms
- Clade: Monocots
- Clade: Commelinids
- Order: Poales
- Family: Poaceae
- Subfamily: Chloridoideae
- Tribe: Cynodonteae
- Subtribe: Scleropogoninae
- Genus: Munroa; Torr. 1857 not Hack. 1887

Type species
- Munroa squarrosa (Nutt.) Torr.

Synonyms
- Monroa Torr., alternate spelling; Hemimunroa Parodi; Dasyochloa Willd. ex Rydb.

= Munroa =

Genus of flowering plants

Munroa is a genus of New World plants in the grass family, native to North and South America.

Species

- Munroa andina Phil. - Bolivia, Chile, Argentina
- Munroa argentina Griseb. - Bolivia, Chile, Argentina
- Munroa decumbens Phil. - Peru, Bolivia, Chile, Argentina
- Munroa mendocina Phil. - Argentina
- Munroa pulchella (Kunth) Amarilla - west-central United States
- Munroa squarrosa (Nutt.) Torr. - western Canada, west-central United States, north-central Mexico (Chihuahua, Coahuila, Durango)

formerly included

see Blepharidachne

- Munroa benthamiana - Blepharidachne benthamiana
