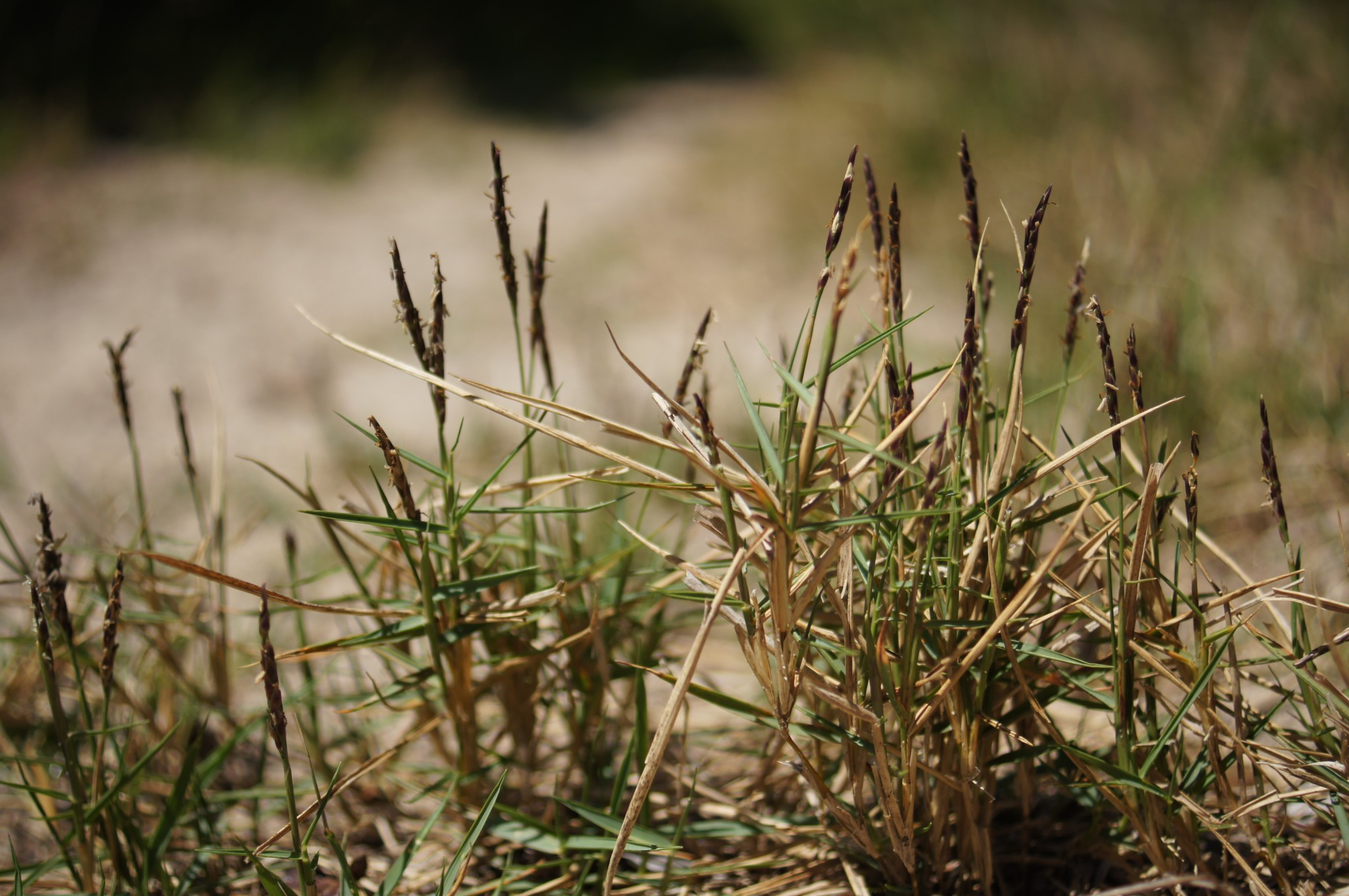

Scientific classification
- Kingdom: Plantae
- Clade: Embryophytes
- Clade: Tracheophytes
- Clade: Spermatophytes
- Clade: Angiosperms
- Clade: Monocots
- Clade: Commelinids
- Order: Poales
- Family: Poaceae
- Subfamily: Chloridoideae
- Genus: Zoysia
- Species: Z. macrantha

Binomial name
- Zoysia macrantha Desv.

= Zoysia macrantha =

Prickly couch

Species of plant

Zoysia macrantha, the prickly couch, is a type of grass.

It is a creeping perennial plant found near the coastal dunes and inland salt marsh habitats in Eastern Australia. Two subspecies are recognized, Zoysia macrantha subsp. macrantha and Zoysia macrantha subsp. walshii.

== Epithet ==
The specific epithet macrantha is derived from Greek, meaning large flower.

== Distribution and Habitat ==
Both subspecies have partially overlaping distributions where subsp. macrantha is found from Byfield in Central Queensland down to Eastern and South Victoria. Subsp. walshii occurs from Eastern Victoria to Eastern South Australia, and Tasmania.

Zoysia macrantha subsp. macrantha can be found growing in coastal foredunes, littoral areas such as mangrove creeks, salt marshes, tidal estuaries, rocky headlands, and lagoons. During erosion events rhizomes may become buried of depths up to 20cm and recover and regrow. It is often found growing behind Spinifex sericeus and with Casaurina equisetifolia, Pandanus tectorius, Banksia integrifolia, livistona australis, Ipomoea pes-caprae, scaevola calendulacea, and Carpobrotus glaucescens all of which assist in dune stabilisation. It is also often found growing with Sporobolus virginicus and Paspalum vaginatum.

== Uses ==
=== Agriculture ===
It is palatable by livestock and its density increases with grazing.

=== No mow lawn ===
It is used a low maintenance lawn.
