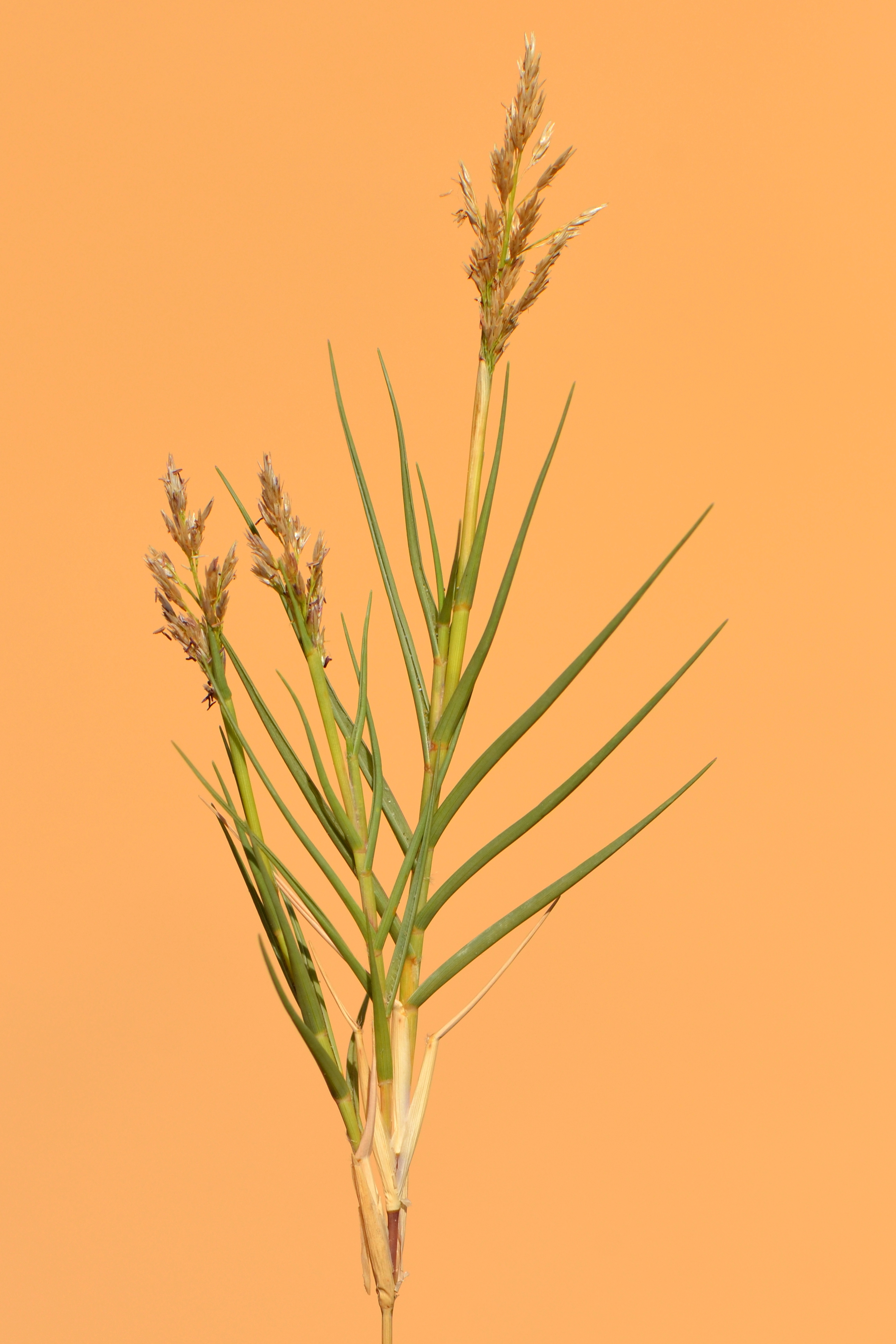
- Aeluropus littoralis

Scientific classification
- Kingdom: Plantae
- Clade: Tracheophytes
- Clade: Angiosperms
- Clade: Monocots
- Clade: Commelinids
- Order: Poales
- Family: Poaceae
- Subfamily: Chloridoideae
- Tribe: Cynodonteae
- Subtribe: Aeluropodinae
- Genus: Aeluropus; Trin.

Type species
- Aeluropus laevis (syn of A. lagopoides) Trin.

Synonyms
- Calotheca Spreng. 1817, illegitimate homonym not Desv. 1810 (syn of Briza); Chamaedactylis T.Nees

= Aeluropus =

Genus of grasses

Aeluropus is a genus of Eurasian and African plants in the grass family, found primarily in desert regions.

Species

- Aeluropus badghyzii Tzvelev - Turkmenistan
- Aeluropus laciniatus Khodash. - Iran
- Aeluropus lagopoides (L.) Thwaites - Mediterranean, Sahara, and Asia from Mauritania + Sicily to Kazakhstan + Nicobar Islands
- Aeluropus littoralis (Gouan) Parl. - Mediterranean + Asia from Spain + Morocco to China
- Aeluropus macrostachyus Hack. - Iran, Afghanistan, Pakistan
- Aeluropus pilosus (X.L.Yang) S.L.Chen & X.L.Yang - Xinjiang

formerly included

see Dactylis Odyssea

- Aeluropus arabicus - Odyssea mucronata
- Aeluropus mucronatus - Odyssea mucronata
- Aeluropus pungens (Vahl) Boiss 1884 not K.Koch 1848 - Odyssea mucronata
- Aeluropus smithii - Dactylis smithii

== See also ==
- List of Poaceae genera
