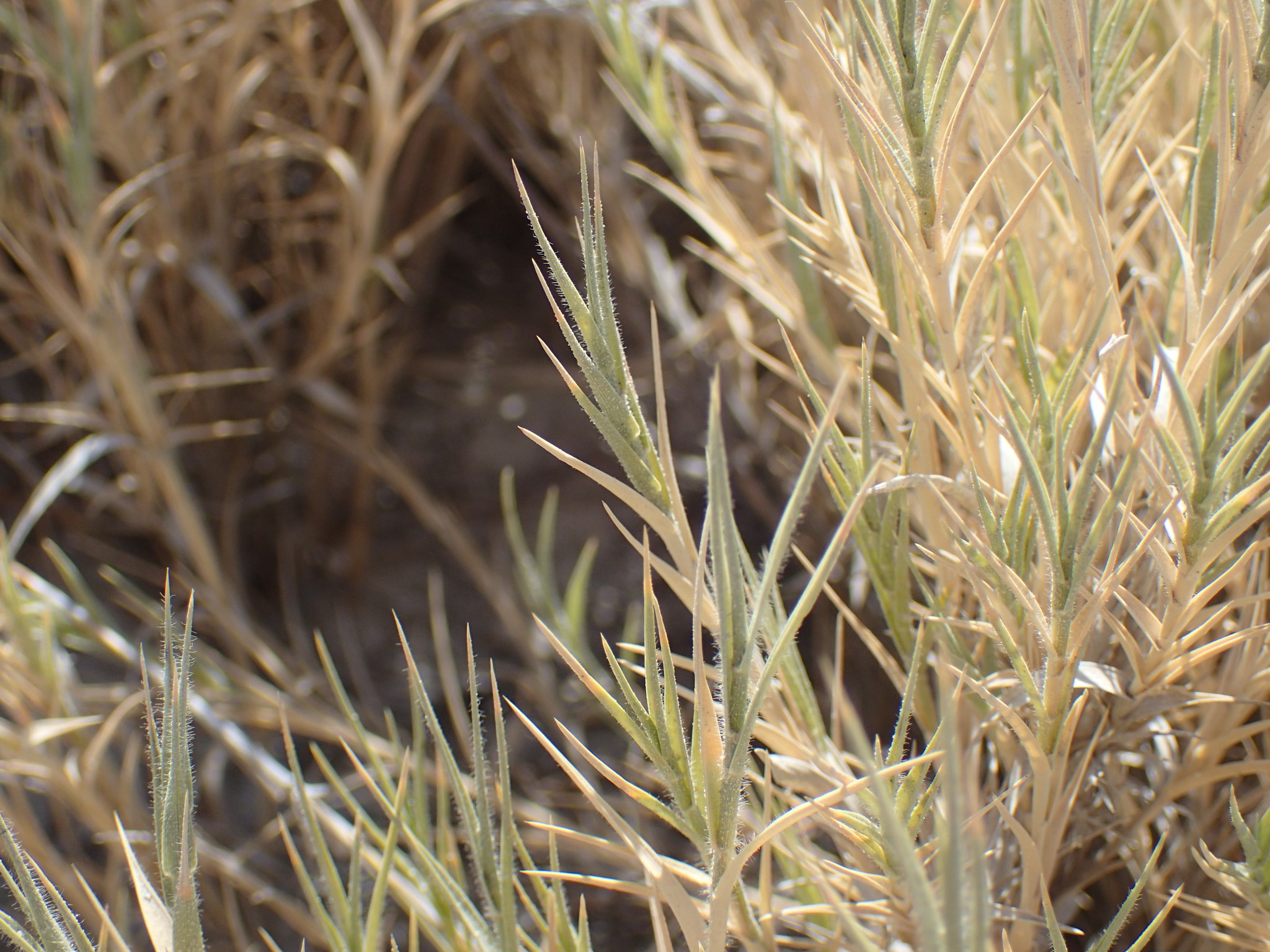

Scientific classification
- Kingdom: Plantae
- Clade: Tracheophytes
- Clade: Angiosperms
- Clade: Monocots
- Clade: Commelinids
- Order: Poales
- Family: Poaceae
- Subfamily: Chloridoideae
- Genus: Odyssea
- Species: O. paucinervis

Binomial name
- Odyssea paucinervis (Nees) Stapf

Synonyms
- Dactylis paucinervis Nees; Diplachne paucinervis (Nees) Stapf ex Rendle

= Odyssea paucinervis =

Species of grass

Odyssea paucinervis is a species of African plants in the grass family. The genus is named after the ancient Greek tale the "Odyssey", in allusion to the long journey the type species has taken through nine genera before settling in this one. The specific name means "few veined".

== Description ==
This grass is a perennial plant with long, stout, rhizomes that penetrate deeply into the ground. The stems branch only at the base, have an L-shaped bend and are up to 30 cm (10 in) in length. They grow in matted tufts and are bluish-green. The ligules are formed from rings of hairs and the leaves are rolled, stiff and tough, and somewhat pungent. The inflorescence is narrowly elliptic or elliptic-oblong and up to 7 cm (3 in) long. It is composed of many spikelets, each with four to nine flowers.

== Distribution ==
Odyssea paucinervis is native to Zaire, Somalia, Tanzania, Angola, Zambia, Zimbabwe, Botswana, Cape Province, Namibia, Limpopo and Mpumalanga.

== Uses ==
Odyssea paucinervis is a salt-tolerant plant that grows on sand and it is often the only plant in its habitat. The leaves are tough and spiky and are of little use as fodder. The plant has a very deep root system and grows by means of extensive rhizomes. Wind-blown sand builds up around the plants which mat together and form mounds. If planted in dunes this grass can bind the sand and help stabilize the dunes.
