= Coelachyrum burttii =

Scientific classification
- Kingdom: Plantae
- Clade: Tracheophytes
- Clade: Angiosperms
- Clade: Monocots
- Clade: Commelinids
- Order: Poales
- Family: Poaceae
- Subfamily: Chloridoideae
- Tribe: Cynodonteae
- Subtribe: Eleusininae
- Genus: Coelachyrum
- Species: C. burttii

Binomial name
- Coelachyrum burttii (C.E.Hubb.) P.M.Peterson

Synonyms
- Apochiton burttii C.E.Hubb.

Genus of grasses

Coelachyrum burttii is a species of grass. it is a loosely tufted annual native to the Kondoa District of north-central Tanzania. Its leaf blades are up to 30 cm. long and 4 mm. wide, glabrous or sparsely hairy on the upper side. Culms are 20 to 90 cm high, erect or sharply bent and rooting at lower nodes. It grows in grey sandy seasonally-wet soils in deciduous bushland and farm fallows between 1100 and 1600 meters elevation.
