= Crypsis vaginiflora =

Scientific classification
- Kingdom: Plantae
- Clade: Tracheophytes
- Clade: Angiosperms
- Clade: Monocots
- Clade: Commelinids
- Order: Poales
- Family: Poaceae
- Subfamily: Chloridoideae
- Genus: Crypsis
- Species: C. vaginiflora

Binomial name
- Crypsis vaginiflora (Forssk.) Opiz

Species of grass

Crypsis vaginiflora is a species of grass known by the common name modest pricklegrass. It is native to North Africa but it can be found in other parts of the world as an introduced species, including the western United States, particularly California, where it is common in wet habitat such as vernal pools. It is an annual grass forming mats of green, prostrate stems not generally exceeding 30 centimeters long. The stems are enveloped in the sheaths of the leaves, the small blades of which break off. The inflorescence is a dense panicle usually no more than 1.5 centimeters long tucked into the sheaths of the uppermost leaves.
