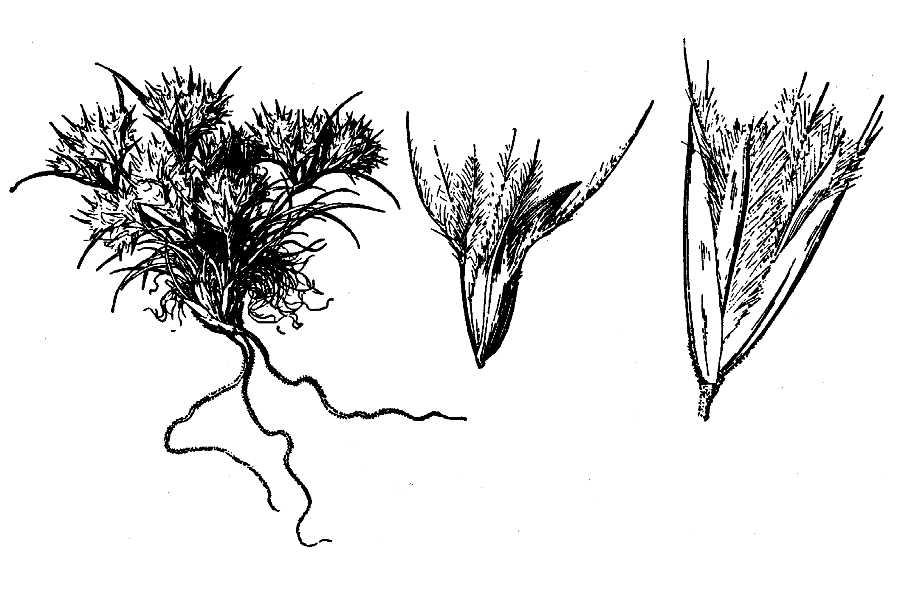

Conservation status
- Apparently Secure (NatureServe)

Scientific classification
- Kingdom: Plantae
- Clade: Tracheophytes
- Clade: Angiosperms
- Clade: Monocots
- Clade: Commelinids
- Order: Poales
- Family: Poaceae
- Subfamily: Chloridoideae
- Genus: Blepharidachne
- Species: B. kingii

Binomial name
- Blepharidachne kingii (S.Wats.) Hack.

= Blepharidachne kingii =

Species of flowering plant

Blepharidachne kingii is a species of grass known by the common name King's eyelashgrass. It is native to the Great Basin in the United States, where it grows in habitat such as pinyon-juniper woodland. It is rare in California and Idaho, but it is one of the most common grasses of the northeastern deserts of Nevada.

== Description ==
Blepharidachne kingii is a perennial bunchgrass growing in clumps or mats of stems 3 to 14 centimetres (1.2 to 5.5 in) tall. The curved, twisted, stiff, hairlike leaf blades are up to 3 centimetres (1.2 in) long. The inflorescence is a purplish to straw-colored panicle of finely hairy spikelets.

Common associates in the flora of the plant's basin and desert habitat include saltbush, winterfat, creosote bush, ragweed, greasewood, hopsage, and boxthorn.
