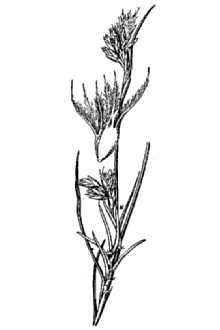

Conservation status
- Vulnerable (NatureServe)

Scientific classification
- Kingdom: Plantae
- Clade: Tracheophytes
- Clade: Angiosperms
- Clade: Monocots
- Clade: Commelinids
- Order: Poales
- Family: Poaceae
- Subfamily: Chloridoideae
- Genus: Blepharidachne
- Species: B. bigelovii

Binomial name
- Blepharidachne bigelovii (S.Watson) Hack.

= Blepharidachne bigelovii =

Species of grass

Blepharidachne bigelovii is a species of grass endemic to the northern Chihuahuan Desert. It grows in rocky slopes in west Texas, southern New Mexico, and northern Coahuila.
