= Benowo railway station =

Railway station in Indonesia

Benowo Station Stasiun Benowo
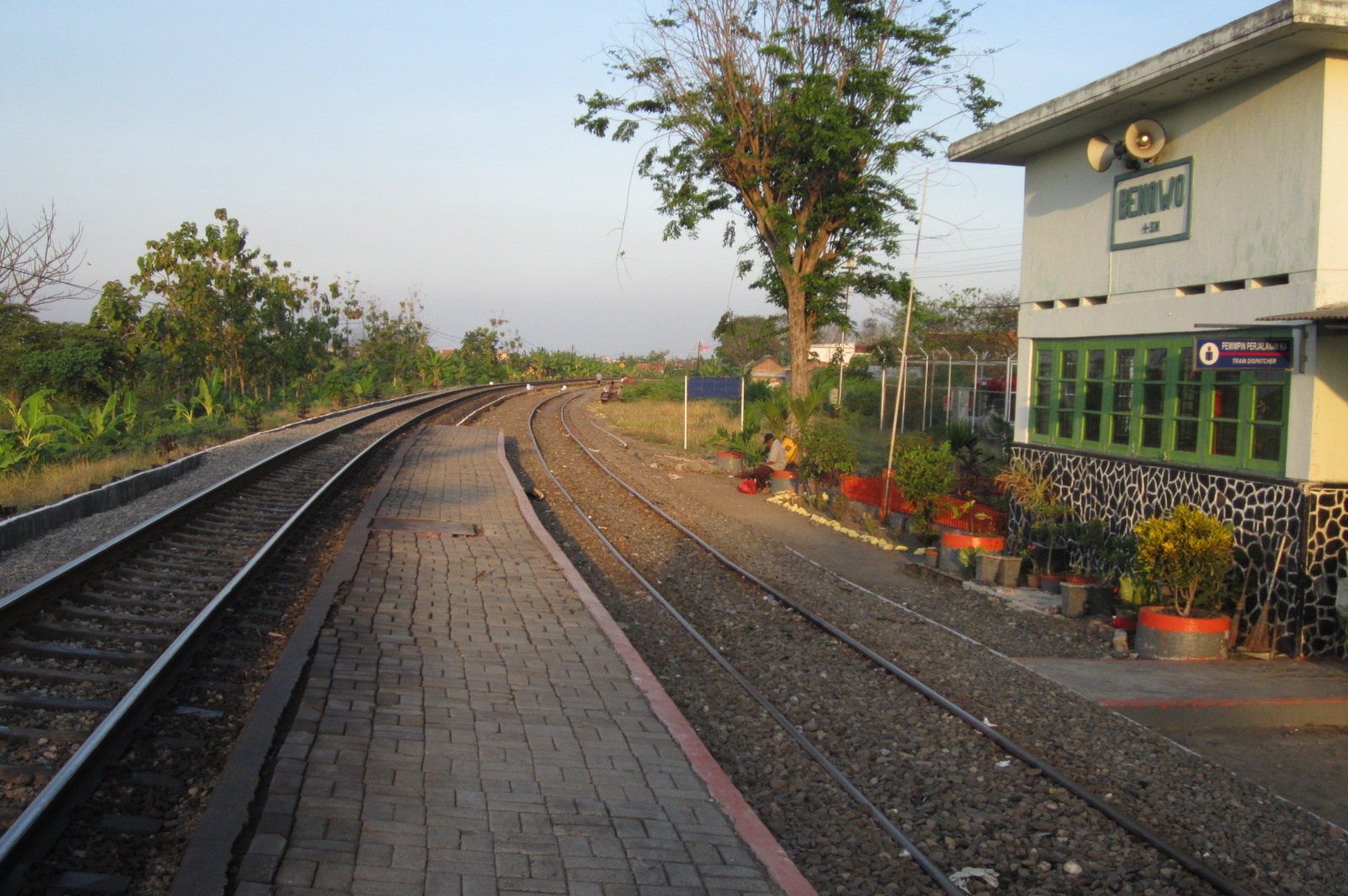
- Benowo Station in 2011

General information
- Location: Benowo, Pakal, Surabaya; East Java; Indonesia
- Coordinates: 07.2340056°S 112.6151944°E
- Elevation: +3 m (9.8 ft)
- Owner: Kereta Api Indonesia
- Operator: Kereta Api Indonesia
- Line: Gambringan–Surabaya Pasar Turi
- Platforms: single island platform single side platform
- Tracks: 4

Construction
- Structure type: Ground
- Parking: Available
- Accessible: Available

Other information
- Station code: BNW • 4419
- Classification: Class III

History
- Opened: 1903

Services
Preceding station		Following station
Cerme towards Cepu	Commuter Line Blorasura	Kandangan towards Surabaya Pasarturi
Cerme towards Babat or Bojonegoro	Commuter Line Arjonegoro	Kandangan towards Surabaya Pasarturi or Sidoarjo
Cerme towards	Commuter Line Arjonegoro BBT-SDA	Kandangan towards
Cerme towards	Commuter Line Arjonegoro BJ-SDA	Kandangan towards
Cerme towards Indro or Babat	Commuter Line Jenggala BBT-MR	Kandangan towards Mojokerto
Location
- Location within Surabaya

Benowo Station is a class III railway station located in Benowo, Pakal, Surabaya, East Java, Indonesia. The station is located at an altitude of 3 meters and is controlled by Operational Area VIII Surabaya. To the north of this station is the Gelora Bung Tomo Stadium.

== Services ==
The following is a list of train services at the Benowo Station

=== Passenger services ===
- Commuter
  - Komuter Sulam, destination of Surabaya Pasar Turi and Lamongan
- Local economy
  - Bojonegoro Local, destination of Bojonegoro and Sidoarjo

Preceding station	Kereta Api Indonesia	Following station
Cerme towards Gambringan	Gambringan–Surabaya Pasar Turi	Kandangan towards Surabaya Pasar Turi
