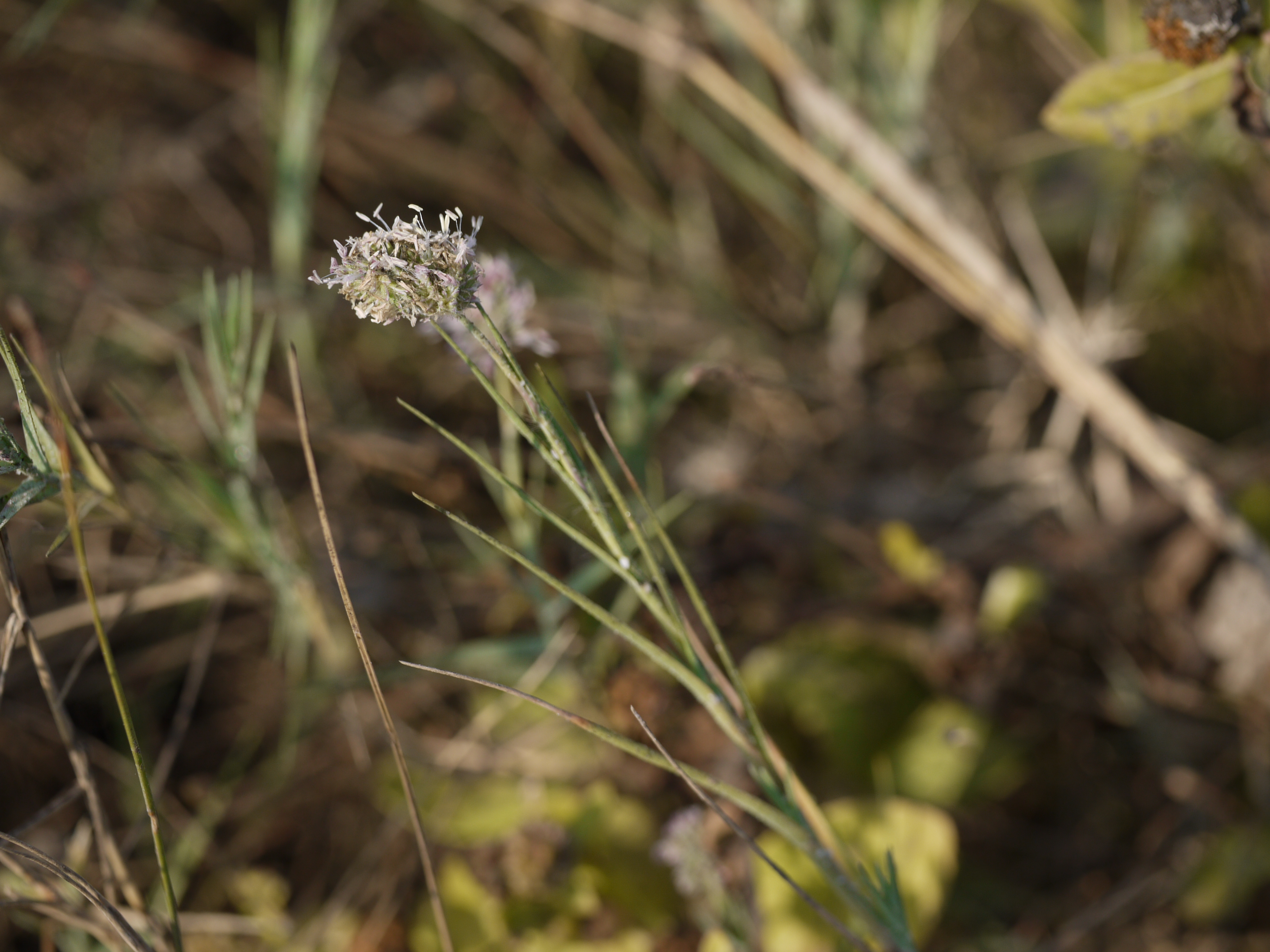

Scientific classification
- Kingdom: Plantae
- Clade: Tracheophytes
- Clade: Angiosperms
- Clade: Monocots
- Clade: Commelinids
- Order: Poales
- Family: Poaceae
- Subfamily: Chloridoideae
- Genus: Aeluropus
- Species: A. lagopoides

Binomial name
- Aeluropus lagopoides (L.) Thwaites

Synonyms
- Poa pungens; Poa repens; Aeluropus concinnus

= Aeluropus lagopoides =

Species of grass

Aeluropus lagopoides, sometimes called mangrove grass or rabbit-foot aeluropus, is a species of Eurasian and African plant in the grass family, found primarily in salty soils and waste places.

== Description ==
Aeluropus lagopoides is a mat-forming, straggling perennial with long stolons and pungent foliage. The stems grow to a maximum length of 30 cm (12 in) and may become woody. The growth is sometimes in the form of tufted erect stems, or may have prostrate stems that root at the nodes. The greyish-green leaves have loose leaf-sheaths, and grow in a single plane from either side of the stem. They are lanceolate with rounded bases, stiff and leathery, 5 to 40 mm (0.2 to 1.6 in) long and 2 to 3 mm (0.08 to 0.12 in) wide. The leaf blades have rough surfaces and are ribbed, with entire margins and pointed tips. The inflorescence is a globose, elliptic or oblong head of densely crowded spikelets, up to 20 mm (0.8 in) long and 10 to 15 mm (0.4 to 0.6 in) wide.

== Distribution and habitat ==
Aeluropus lagopoides is found in northern Africa, the eastern Mediterranean region, the Middle East, the Arabian Peninsula and eastwards in Asia as far as Pakistan and India. It is a halophytic plant and is found in damp soil on the fringes of salt marshes, near sulphurous springs, on salt flats, on vacant ground, road verges and in places where little else grows. In the Indian subcontinent it is only found in areas with arid and semi-arid soils. It is found in wet and even waterlogged saline conditions but not in highly alkaline soils.

== Ecology ==
Aeluropus lagopoides is adapted to the saline conditions in which it is often found by having a thick waxy cuticle, and by having glands that can secrete excess salt. The seeds are able to germinate at concentrations of up to 500 mM NaCl in warmer conditions, a concentration of salt roughly equivalent to sea water, but not at temperatures below 20 °C (68 °F); the seeds remain viable at high salt concentrations and can germinate when the concentration reduces, after rainfall for example.

Aeluropus lagopoides is useful for stabilising sand and produces good fodder, dying back in the dry season and sprouting well after winter rains. Despite a three-fold increase in soil salt content in some areas in summer, the concentration of salt in the tissues shows little variation. It is favoured by grazing animals because the foliage does not accumulate salt in the same way as does that of Suaeda fruticosa and Salsola stocksii, other plants with which it is found growing on saltlands.
