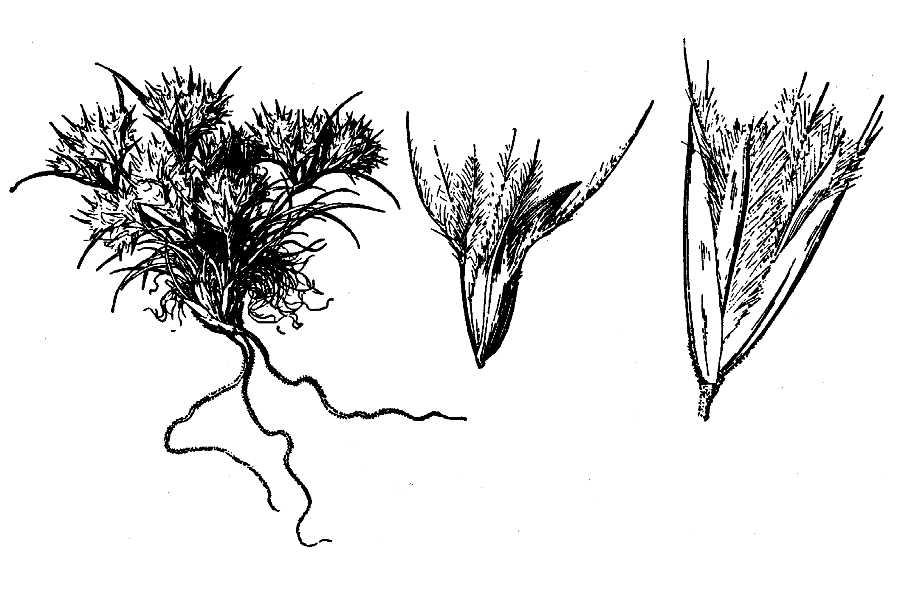
- Blepharidachne kingii

Scientific classification
- Kingdom: Plantae
- Clade: Tracheophytes
- Clade: Angiosperms
- Clade: Monocots
- Clade: Commelinids
- Order: Poales
- Family: Poaceae
- Subfamily: Chloridoideae
- Tribe: Cynodonteae
- Subtribe: Scleropogoninae
- Genus: Blepharidachne; Hack.

Type species
- Blepharidachne kingii (S. Wats.) Hack.

Synonyms
- Eremochloe S. Wats. 1871 not Buse 1854

= Blepharidachne =

Genus of grasses

Blepharidachne is a small genus of New World plants in the grass family, generally known as eyelashgrass or desertgrass. .

Species

- Blepharidachne benthamiana - Argentina
- Blepharidachne bigelovii - Texas, New Mexico, Coahuila
- Blepharidachne hitchcockii - Argentina
- Blepharidachne kingii - California, Nevada, Utah, Idaho

== See also ==
- List of Poaceae genera
