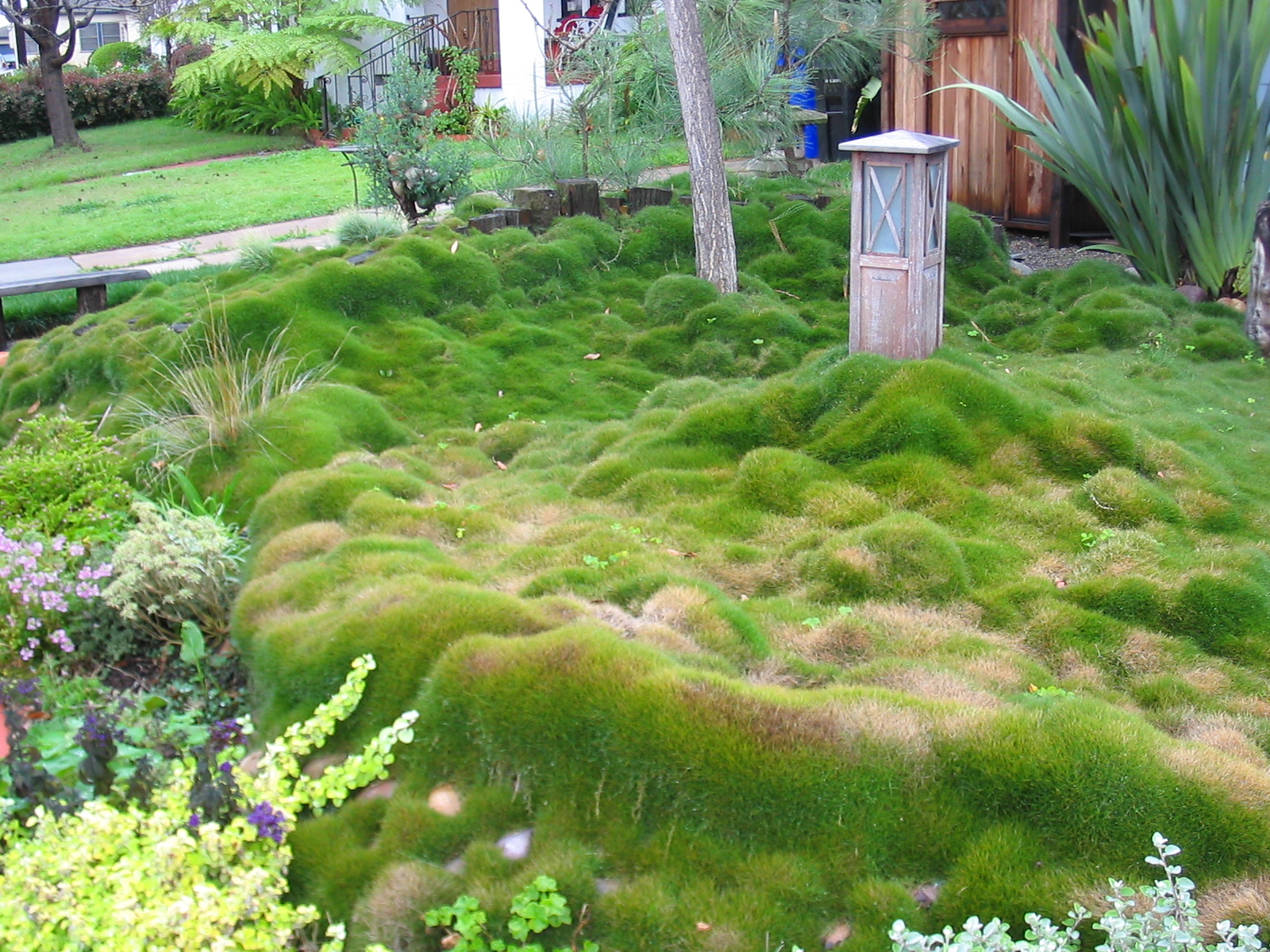
- Cultivated Zoysia

Scientific classification
- Kingdom: Plantae
- Clade: Tracheophytes
- Clade: Angiosperms
- Clade: Monocots
- Clade: Commelinids
- Order: Poales
- Family: Poaceae
- Subfamily: Chloridoideae
- Tribe: Zoysieae
- Subtribe: Zoysiinae
- Genus: Zoysia; Willd.

Synonyms
- Brousemichea Balansa; Matrella Pers.; Osterdamia Neck. ex Kuntze; Zoydia Pers., alternate spelling

= Zoysia =

Genus of flowering plants

Zoysia (UK: /ˈzɔɪziə/; US: /ˈzɔɪsiə/, -/ziə/, -/ʃə/, -/ʒə/) is a genus of creeping grasses widespread across much of Asia and Australia, as well as various islands in the Pacific. These species, commonly called zoysia or zoysiagrass, are found in coastal areas or grasslands. It is a popular choice for fairways and teeing areas at golf courses. The genus is named after the Slovenian botanist Karl von Zois (1756–1799).

== Species ==
Sources:

- Zoysia × forbesiana Traub - Japan - (Z. japonica × Z. matrella)
- Zoysia × hondana Ohwi - Japan - (Z. japonica × Z. macrostachya)
- Zoysia japonica Steud. - zenith zoysia, Korean lawngrass - Japan (incl Bonin Is), Korea, China, Primorye; naturalized in India, North America, etc.
- Zoysia macrantha Desv. - Australia
- Zoysia macrostachya Franch. & Sav. - Japan, Korea, eastern China, Ryukyu Is
- Zoysia matrella (L.) Merr. - Southeast Asia, Japan, China, Indian subcontinent, New Guinea, Queensland, Micronesia; naturalized in parts of Africa, North and South America, and assorted oceanic islands
- Zoysia minima (Colenso) Zotov - New Zealand
- Zoysia pauciflora Mez - North Island of New Zealand
- Zoysia seslerioides (Balansa) Clayton & F.R.Richardson - Vietnam
- Zoysia sinica Hance Japan, Korea, eastern China, Ryukyu Is
- Zoysia tenuifolia Thiele - mascarene grass, Korean velvet grass

== Cultivation and uses ==
Because they can tolerate wide variations in temperature, sunlight, and water, zoysia are widely used for lawns in temperate climates. They are used on golf courses to create fairways and teeing grounds. Zoysia grasses stop erosion on slopes, and are excellent at repelling weeds throughout the year. They resist disease and hold up well under traffic.

The cultivar Zoysia 'Emerald' (Emerald Zoysia), a hybrid between Z. japonica and Z. tenuifolia, is particularly popular.

Some types of zoysia are available commercially as sod in some areas. In typical savanna climates with warm wet and dry seasons, such as southern Florida, zoysia grasses grow during the warm-wet summer and are dormant in the drier, cooler winter months. They are popular because of their fine texture, soft feel, and low growth habit. They can form dense mats and even mounds that grow over low features. Compared to St. Augustine grass, they generally require less fertilization and are less vulnerable to insect and fungus damage, depending on environmental conditions. For best appearance, turf experts recommend reel blade mowers for zoysia.
