= Rhizocephalus =

Scientific classification
- Kingdom: Plantae
- Clade: Embryophytes
- Clade: Tracheophytes
- Clade: Angiosperms
- Clade: Monocots
- Clade: Commelinids
- Order: Poales
- Family: Poaceae
- Subfamily: Pooideae
- Supertribe: Poodae
- Tribe: Poeae
- Subtribe: Beckmanniinae
- Genus: Rhizocephalus; Boiss.
- Species: R. orientalis

Binomial name
- Rhizocephalus orientalis Boiss.

Synonyms
- Heleochloa orientalis (Boiss.) Dinsm.; Crypsis pygmaea Jaub. & Spach; Heleochloa pygmaea (Jaub. & Spach) B.D.Jacks.; Heleochloa turkestanica Litv.; Rhizocephalus turkestanicus (Litv.) Roshev.

Genus of plants

Rhizocephalus is a genus of plants in the grass family, Poaceae. The only known species is Rhizocephalus orientalis, native to Afghanistan, Armenia, Georgia, Iran, Iraq, Israel, Jordan, Lebanon, Palestine, Syria, Asiatic Turkey, and Uzbekistan.
