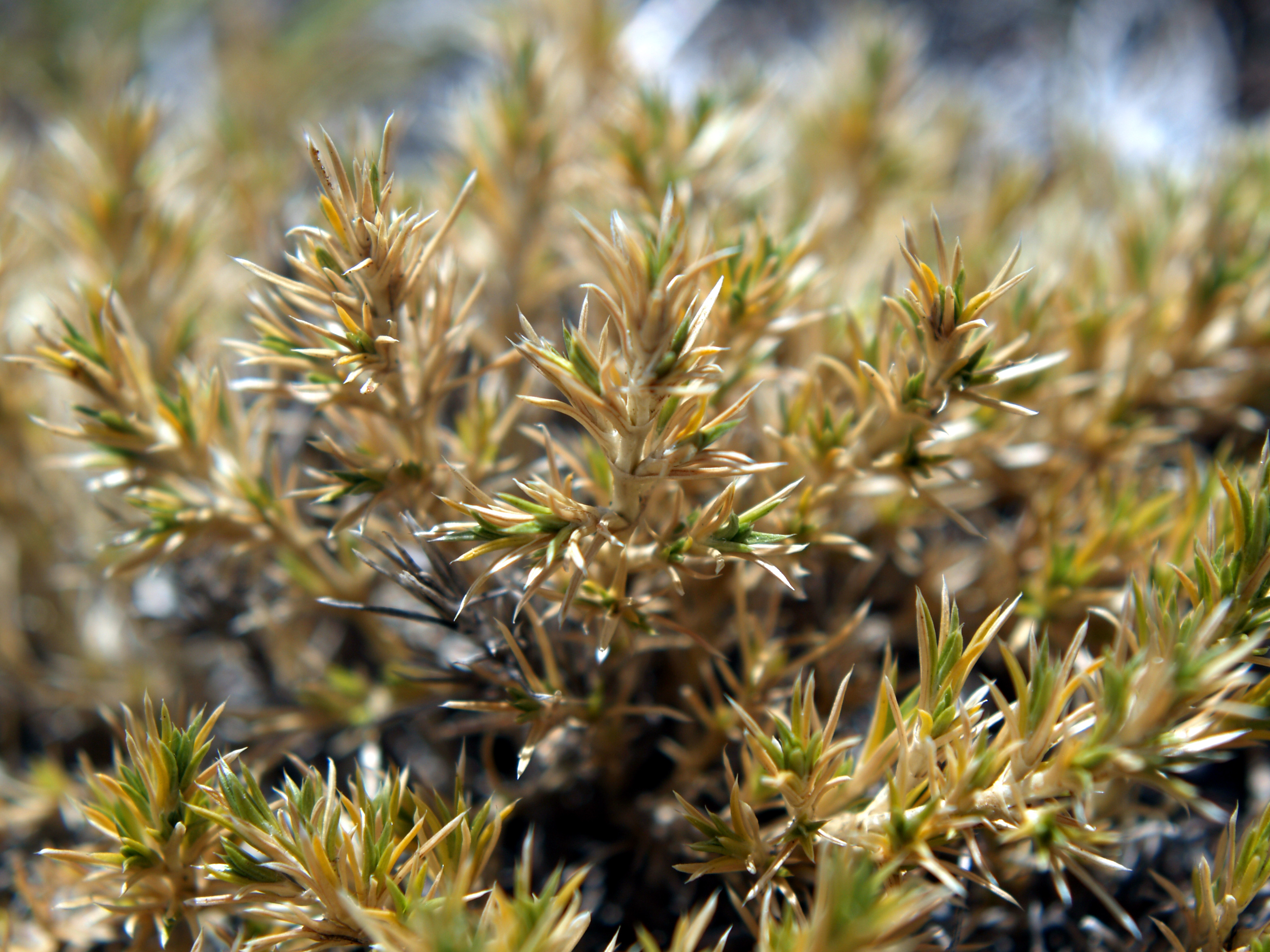

Scientific classification
- Kingdom: Plantae
- Clade: Tracheophytes
- Clade: Angiosperms
- Clade: Monocots
- Clade: Commelinids
- Order: Poales
- Family: Poaceae
- Subfamily: Chloridoideae
- Genus: Munroa
- Species: M. squarrosa

Binomial name
- Munroa squarrosa (Nutt.) Torr.

= Munroa squarrosa =

Species of flowering plant

Munroa squarrosa is a species of grass known by the common name false buffalograss. It is native to North America from central Canada to Chihuahua in Mexico. It can be found in many types of dry, open habitat, including disturbed areas.

== Description ==
It is an annual bunchgrass producing a stem with many branches forming a tangled mat no more than 20 centimeters wide. The short, narrow, spiky leaves are 1 to 2 centimeters long and have hair-lined edges. The inflorescence is short and sometimes located within a crowded cluster of leaves toward the ends of the stems. The hairy spikelets are just under a centimeter in length.
