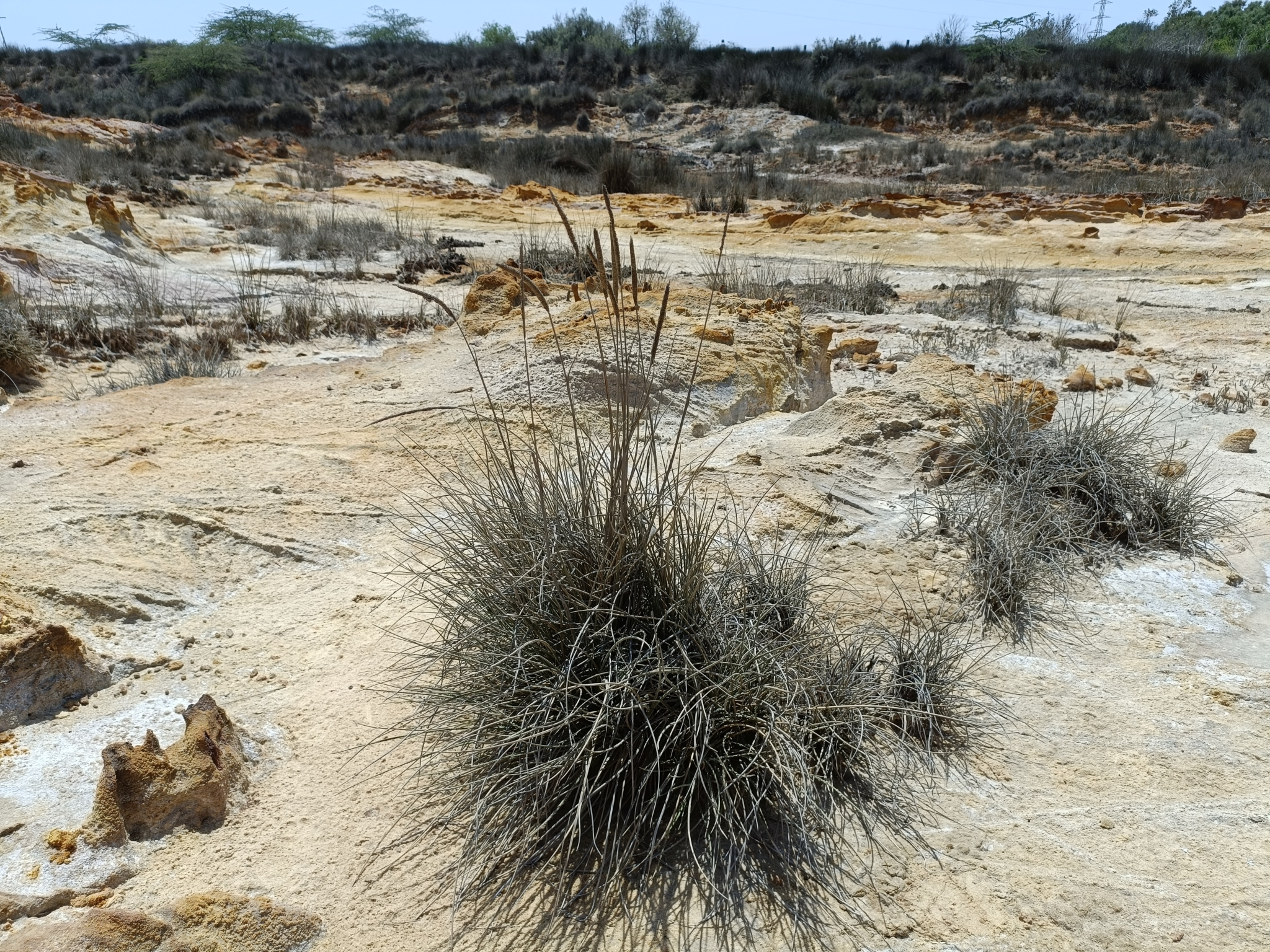
- Urochondra setulosa in India

Scientific classification
- Kingdom: Plantae
- Clade: Tracheophytes
- Clade: Angiosperms
- Clade: Monocots
- Clade: Commelinids
- Order: Poales
- Family: Poaceae
- Subfamily: Chloridoideae
- Tribe: Zoysieae
- Subtribe: Zoysiinae
- Genus: Urochondra; C.E.Hubb.
- Species: U. setulosa

Binomial name
- Urochondra setulosa (Trin.) C.E.Hubb.

Synonyms
- Vilfa setulosa Trin.; Sporobolus setulosus (Trin.) A.Terracc.; Crypsis setulosa (Trin.) Mez; Heleochloa setulosa (Trin.) Blatt. & McCann; Agrostis elatior Steud.; Crypsis dura Boiss.; Heleochloa dura (Boiss.) Boiss.; Heleochloa dura subsp. kuriensis Vierh.; Heterochloa dura (Boiss.) Balf.f.

= Urochondra =

Genus of grasses

Urochondra is a genus of plants in the grass family. The only known species is Urochondra setulosa, native to northeastern Africa (Djibouti, Eritrea, Sudan, Somalia, Socotra) and southwestern Asia (Saudi Arabia, Oman, Yemen, northwestern India, and Sindh Province in Pakistan). The species grows in coastal sand dunes, salt marshes and estuaries.
