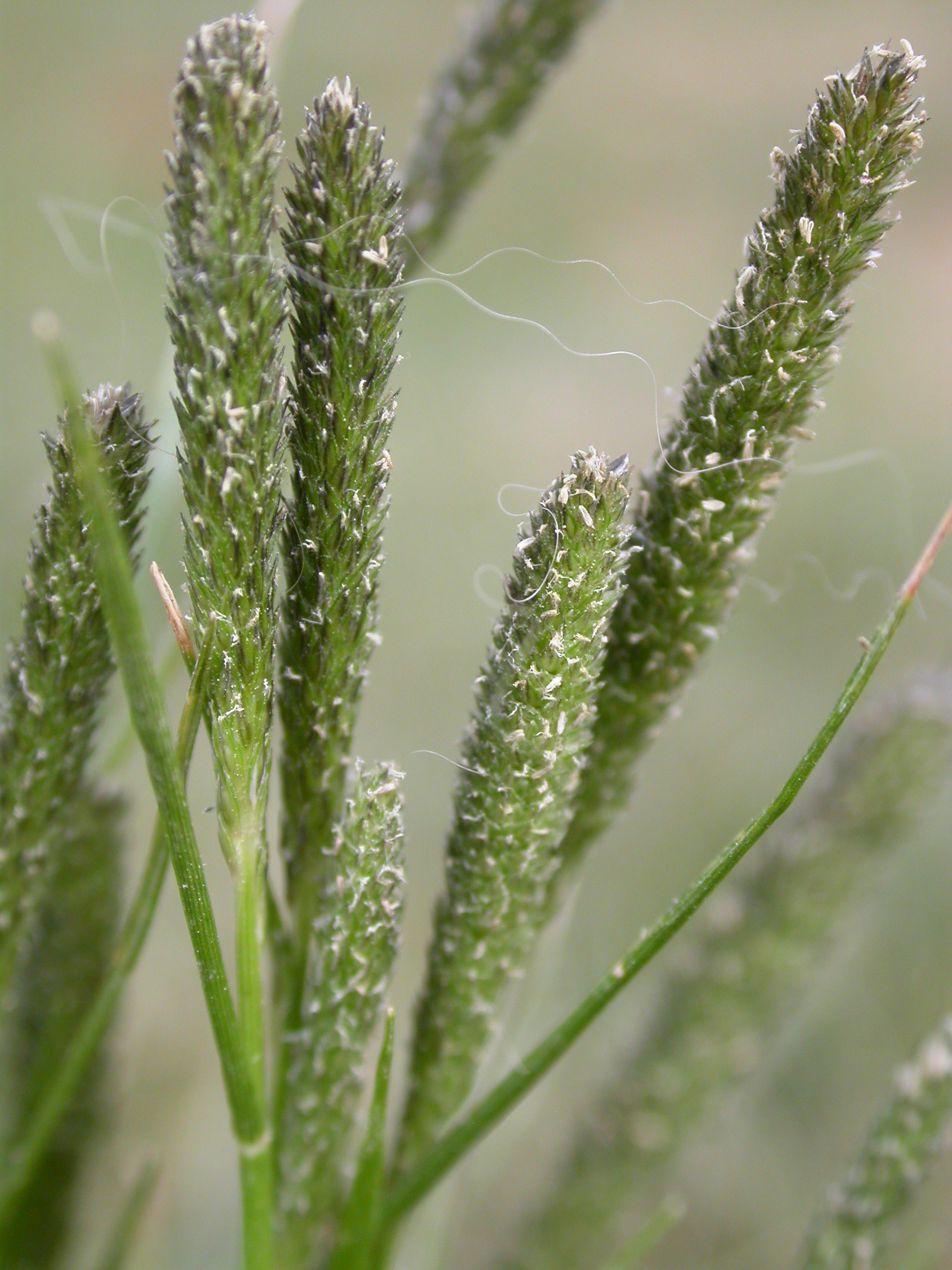

Scientific classification
- Kingdom: Plantae
- Clade: Tracheophytes
- Clade: Angiosperms
- Clade: Monocots
- Clade: Commelinids
- Order: Poales
- Family: Poaceae
- Subfamily: Chloridoideae
- Genus: Sporobolus
- Species: S. alopecuroides

Binomial name
- Sporobolus alopecuroides (Piller & Mitterp.) P.M.Peterson

Synonyms
- List: Crypsis alopecuroides (Piller & Mitterp.) Schrad.; Heleochloa alopecuroides (Piller & Mitterp.) Host ex Roem.; Phleum alopecuroides Piller & Mitterp.; Agrostis brachystachys (C.Presl) Schult. & Schult.f.; Alopecurus fulvus Forssk. ex Steud.; Alopecurus geniculatus Sibth. ex Steud.; Chilochloa explicata (Link) Roem. & Schult.; Crypsis aegyptiaca Tausch; Crypsis alopecuroides subsp. brachystachys (C.Presl) Trab.; Crypsis alopecuroides var. celakovskyi Rohlena; Crypsis alopecuroides var. nigricans (Guss.) Coss.; Crypsis alopecuroides var. sicula (Jan) Asch. & Graebn.; Crypsis alopecuroides var. tenella Heuff.; Crypsis alopecuroides var. tenella Adamovic, nom. illeg.; Crypsis brachystachys Trab.; Crypsis explicata (Link) F.Herm.; Crypsis geniculata Roem. & Schult.; Crypsis macrostachya Brot.; Crypsis nigricans Guss.; Crypsis phalaroides M.Bieb.; Crypsis schoenoides Hochst. ex Steud.; Crypsis sicula Jan; Crypsis tenella Pančić; Crypsis tenuissima Tausch; Heleochloa alopecuroides var. celakovskyi (Rohlena) Soó; Heleochloa alopecuroides var. nigricans (Guss.) T.Durand & Schinz; Heleochloa alopecuroides var. nigricans (Guss.) Soó; Heleochloa alopecuroides f. subvaginata Hack.; Heleochloa brachystachys (C.Presl) K.Richt.; Heleochloa explicata (Link) Hack. ex Fritsch; Phalaris explicata Link; Phalaris geniculata Sm.; Vilfa brachystachys C.Presl

= Sporobolus alopecuroides =

Species of grass

Sporobolus alopecuroides is a species of grass known by the common name foxtail pricklegrass. It is native to Europe, the Middle East, and North Africa. It is also known in the western United States as a common and widespread introduced species, especially in sandy areas around water, such as lakesides. It has also been collected at shipping points near Philadelphia but has not been seen there in about a century. This is an annual grass producing mostly upright and unbranching stems, often dark in color, up to about 75 centimeters in maximum height. The green leaves are up to 12 centimeters long, sometimes waxy in texture. The inflorescence is a dense cylindrical panicle of tiny green to purple spikelets.
