= Psilolemma =

Scientific classification
- Kingdom: Plantae
- Clade: Tracheophytes
- Clade: Angiosperms
- Clade: Monocots
- Clade: Commelinids
- Order: Poales
- Family: Poaceae
- Subfamily: Chloridoideae
- Tribe: Zoysieae
- Subtribe: Sporobolinae
- Genus: Psilolemma; S.M.Phillips
- Species: P. jaegeri

Binomial name
- Psilolemma jaegeri (Pilg.) S.M.Phillips

Synonyms
- Diplachne jaegeri Pilg.; Odyssea jaegeri (Pilg.) Robyns & Tournay

Genus of grasses

Psilolemma is a genus of plants in the grass family. The only known species is Psilolemma jaegeri, native to the Democratic Republic of the Congo, Kenya, Uganda and Tanzania.

A wiry, somewhat spiny perennial mat-grass 7–35 cm tall with long, tough, thin, wide-spreading stolons and pungent-smelling leaves. Glaucous or yellowish shoots of numerous bristly leaves form dense tufts at the stolon nodes. Stems are leafy, slender, with bulbous bases. Leaf-blades are stiff and 0.5–7 cm. long, 1.5–2 mm. wide, with sheaths that usually overlap and 0.3–0.75 mm. long ligules. Flowering clusters are narrow and 3.5–12 cm. long.
