= Sporobolus aculeatus =

Scientific classification
- Kingdom: Plantae
- Clade: Tracheophytes
- Clade: Angiosperms
- Clade: Monocots
- Clade: Commelinids
- Order: Poales
- Family: Poaceae
- Subfamily: Chloridoideae
- Genus: Sporobolus
- Species: S. aculeatus

Binomial name
- Sporobolus aculeatus (L.) P.M.Peterson

Synonyms
- Schoenus aculeatus L.; Agrostis aculeata (L.) Scop.; Anthoxanthum aculeatum (L.) L.f.; Antitragus aculeatus (L.) Gaertn.; Crypsis aculeata (L.) Aiton; Crypsis schoenoides P.Beauv.; Heleochloa diandra Host; Ischaemum aculeatum Munro; Pallasia aculeata (L.) Kuntze; Phleum aculeatum (L.) Lam.; Raddia aculeata (L.) Mazziari

Species of plant

Sporobolus aculeatus, also known as sharp-leaved grass, is a species of plants in the family Poaceae (true grasses).
