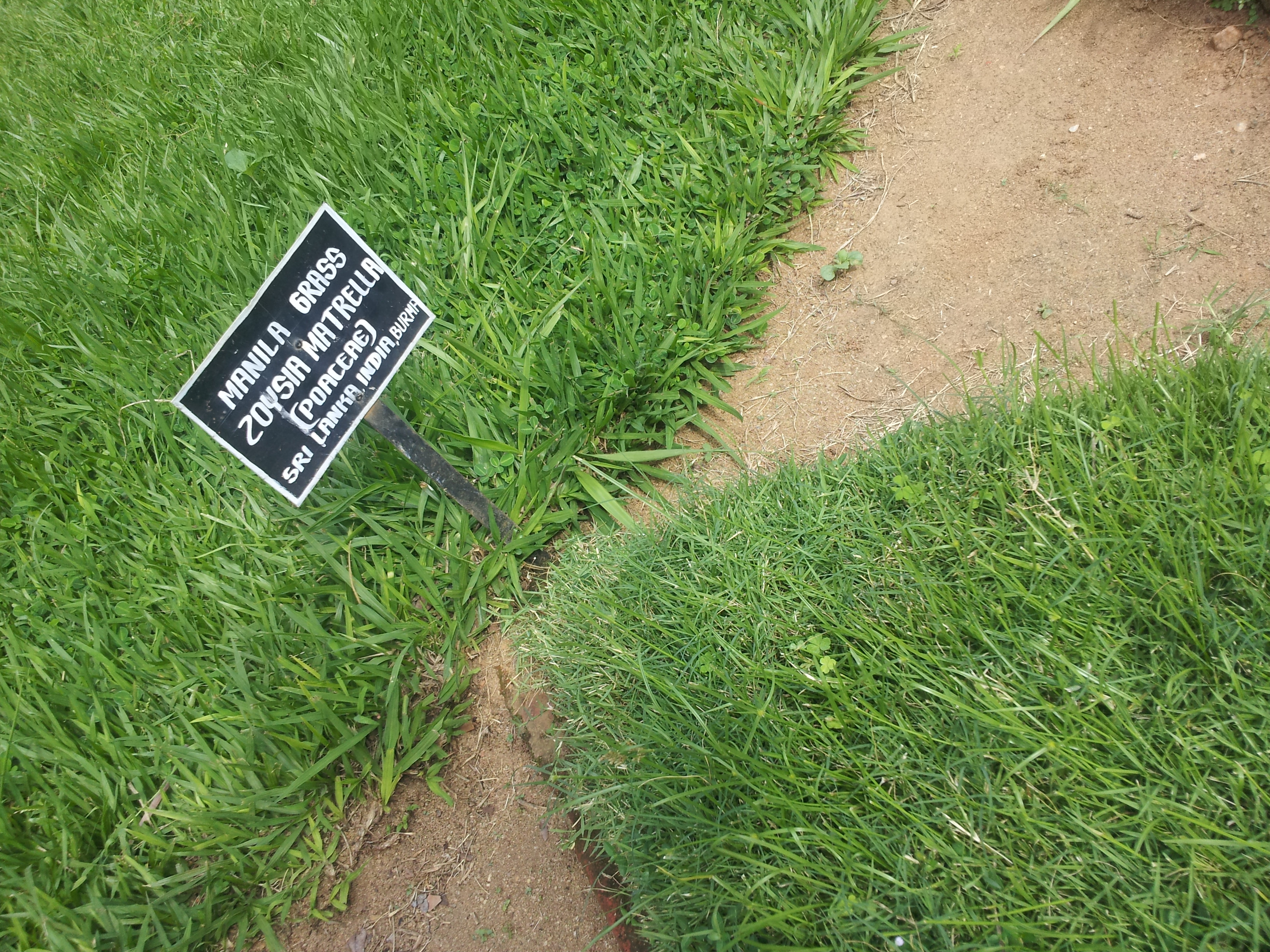
- at Peradeniya Botanical Garden

Scientific classification
- Kingdom: Plantae
- Clade: Embryophytes
- Clade: Tracheophytes
- Clade: Angiosperms
- Clade: Monocots
- Clade: Commelinids
- Order: Poales
- Family: Poaceae
- Subfamily: Chloridoideae
- Genus: Zoysia
- Species: Z. matrella

Binomial name
- Zoysia matrella (L.) Merr.

Synonyms
- Agrostis matrella L.; Zoysia pungens Willd. (1801); Zoysia tenuifolia Willd. ex Thiel (1834)

= Zoysia matrella =

Species of plant

Zoysia matrella (L.) Merr., commonly known as Manila grass, is a species of mat-forming, perennial grass native to temperate coastal southeastern Asia and northern Australasia, from southern Japan (Ryukyu Islands), Taiwan, and southern China (Guangdong, Hainan) south through Thailand, Indonesia, Malaysia and the Philippines to northern Australia (northeast Queensland), and west to the Cocos Islands in the eastern Indian Ocean.

Other common names include Manila templegrass, siglap grass (after an area in Singapore), temple grass, harishiba, hierba Manila (Spanish), Japanese carpet, jukut kakawatan hijau (Sundanese), rebha sekem-sekeman (Madurese), burikit (on Seram), rumput siglap (Malay), damong-alat, barit-baritan (Tagalog), malakuwerdas (Pangasinan), ya-nuannoi (Thai).

== Description ==
It forms extensive, velvety, green mats, spreading vigorously by stolons, or occasionally by rhizomes, once established. Z. matrella grows in low elevation preferring sandy soils where other grasses establish poorly. The stems are slender and prostrate, ranging from 5–25 cm in length. The leaves are alternate, produced at 1.5–3 cm intervals along the stem; they are slender, 2–10 cm long and 1–3 mm broad. The flowers are greenish, produced on erect racemes 6–35 mm long with a single 2–3.5 mm flower in each spikelet.

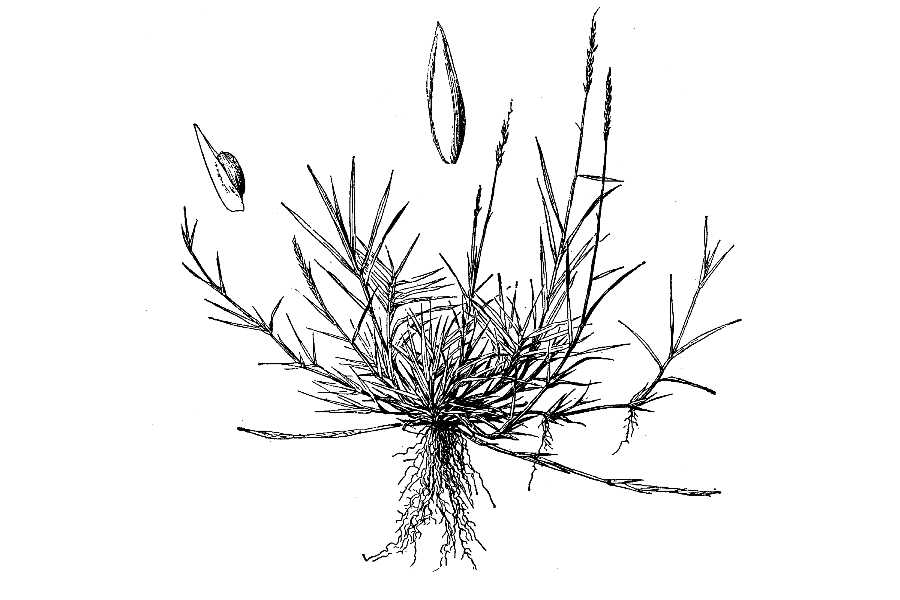
Zoysia matrella line drawing

Two varieties are distinguished by some authors:

- Zoysia matrella var. matrella
- Zoysia matrella var. pacifica Goudswaard (Syn Zoysia tenuifolia)

== Cultivation and uses ==
Manila grass is grown as an ornamental grass, and is used for turf on golf courses in Asia, Europe and the Americas, as a lawn grass in the United States especially in the South, and is planted for grazing stock among the trees on tropical coconut plantations. In addition to its ability to grow on sandy soils, it tolerates high salinity, making it ideal for erosion control and lawns in coastal areas.

The variety of common names attests to its widespread occurrence in these regions along with its usefulness as a cultivated grass in diverse areas. It is naturalised in many places, as in Hawaii, and can become weedy, like many plant species with desirable horticultural characteristics.

The 1889 book 'The Useful Native Plants of Australia’ records that this plant is "A grass of considerable value on littoral swamps and dry flats near the sea. According to Kirk, it is found sometimes forming a compact turf of dry land, and affording a large supply of succulent herbage for horses, cattle and sheep. Its value, however, in such localities, if bulkier grasses would grow there, must be comparatively little, as, from its close-growing habit, it chokes out all other species. It is evidently much relished by stock, and is worthy of introduction in sand-hill districts near the sea, or saline soil inland; it would clothe the wet fiats with a valuable sward. It will be easiest propagated by roots, the closely-matted, wiry fibres forming coherent masses of turf, which are easily conveyed in fragments to a distance without injury."

== Cultivars ==
A number of cultivars have been developed:

- 'BRF (Blade Runner Farms) Zoysia'
- 'Sir Grange' - Sold in Australia

== Allelopathy ==
Zoysia matrella shoot's contain allelopathic chemicals that appear to affect germination rates, radicle length, and shoot length with varying levels of harm with other plants. These chemicals also appear to decompose into inert chemicals within 15–30 days under moist soil conditions.
