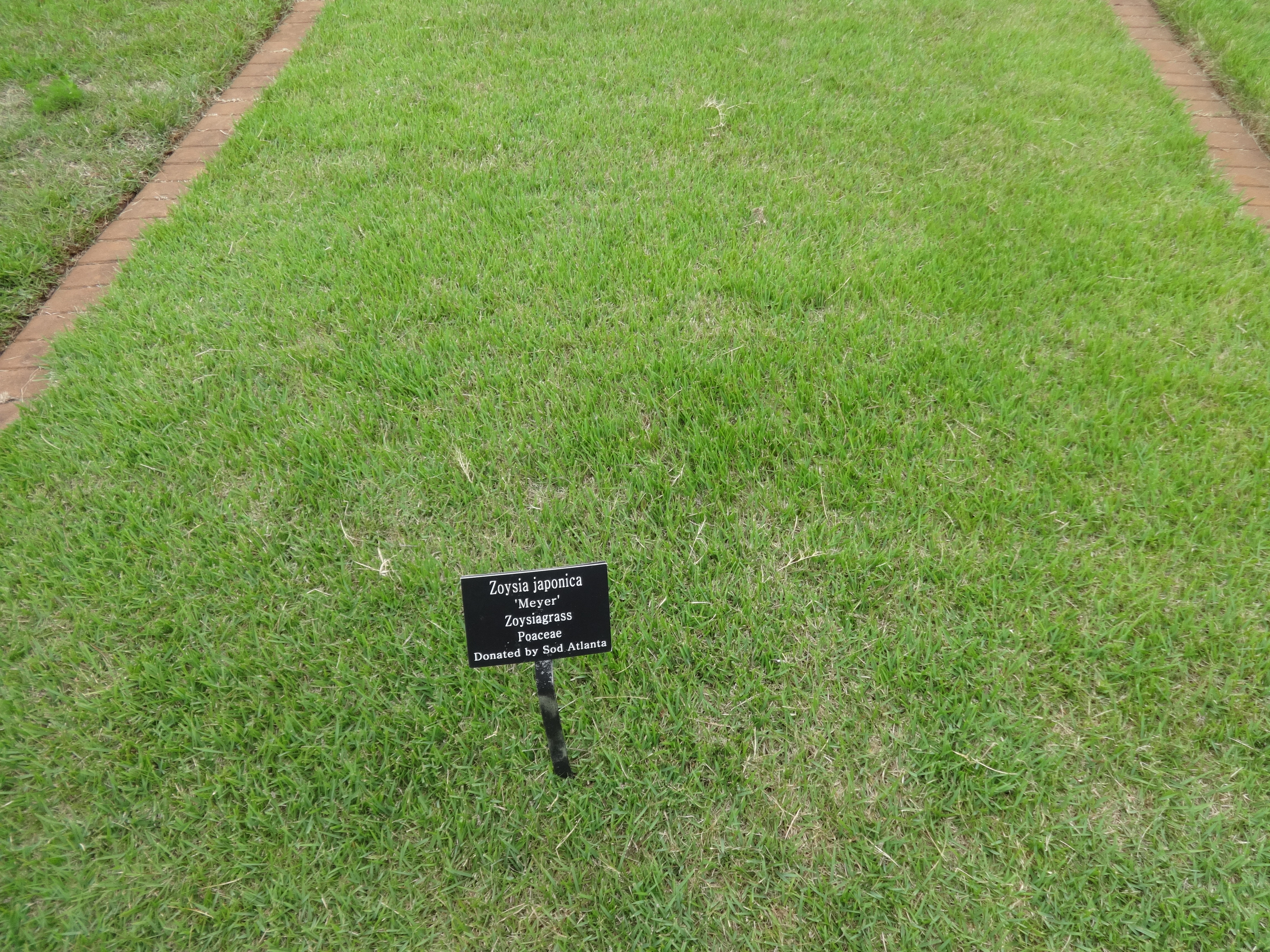

Scientific classification
- Kingdom: Plantae
- Clade: Tracheophytes
- Clade: Angiosperms
- Clade: Monocots
- Clade: Commelinids
- Order: Poales
- Family: Poaceae
- Subfamily: Chloridoideae
- Genus: Zoysia
- Species: Z. japonica

Binomial name
- Zoysia japonica Steud.

= Zoysia japonica =

Species of grass

Zoysia japonica (commonly known as Korean lawngrass, zoysia grass or Japanese lawngrass) is a species of creeping, mat-forming, short perennial grass that grows by both rhizomes and stolons. It is native to the coastal grasslands of southeast Asia and Indonesia. The United States was first introduced to Z. japonica in 1895. It received its first import from the Chinese region of Manchuria. Today, Z. japonica has become one of the most widely used species of turfgrass in the United States and other countries worldwide such as in Brazil, serving as a close and cheaper alternative to bermudagrass.

== Morphology/characteristics ==
Zoysia japonica has smooth, stiff, vertical leaf blades that roll in the bud. It grows to around 0.5 millimetres (3/128 in) in width, and is hairy near the base and exhibits short inflorescences. The pedicles grow to about 1.75 millimetres (9/128 in), while the ascending culm internodes measure to roughly 14 millimetres (35/64 in) long. Z. japonica has a very coarse texture, compared to others of its genus. Its high tolerance to drought, freezing temperatures, salt, and shade make for a favorable lawn grass. An adventitious root system grounds the grass. When exposed to prolonged drought, it easily adapts by developing deeper rooting systems. Although it is tolerant to freezing temperatures, it does lose its bright green color, turning brown after frost.

== Genomics ==
Z. japonica is tetraploid.

== Climate and regions ==
Zoysia japonica needs a humid climate to survive. It does well in cool temperate zones, transition zones, and warm temperate or marine zones. It was originally cultivated in such climates in China, Japan, and Korea. In the United States, it is cultivated south of Connecticut, along the Atlantic Coast, and along the Gulf Coast to Texas. In Australia, it is cultivated along the northeastern coastline.

== Cultivation ==
Although Z. japonica is one of the only Zoysia species that can be seeded, it has a lengthy germination rate of at least a month, so vegetative planting is the primary form of cultivation. Z. japonica seeds require a moist environment and a temperature of at least 70 °F (21 °C) to germinate, and therefore sod, sprigs, and plugs are less prohibitive methods of planting. Nevertheless, sod is sold at a steep price. Although it can be planted at almost any time of year, late summer planting is discouraged.

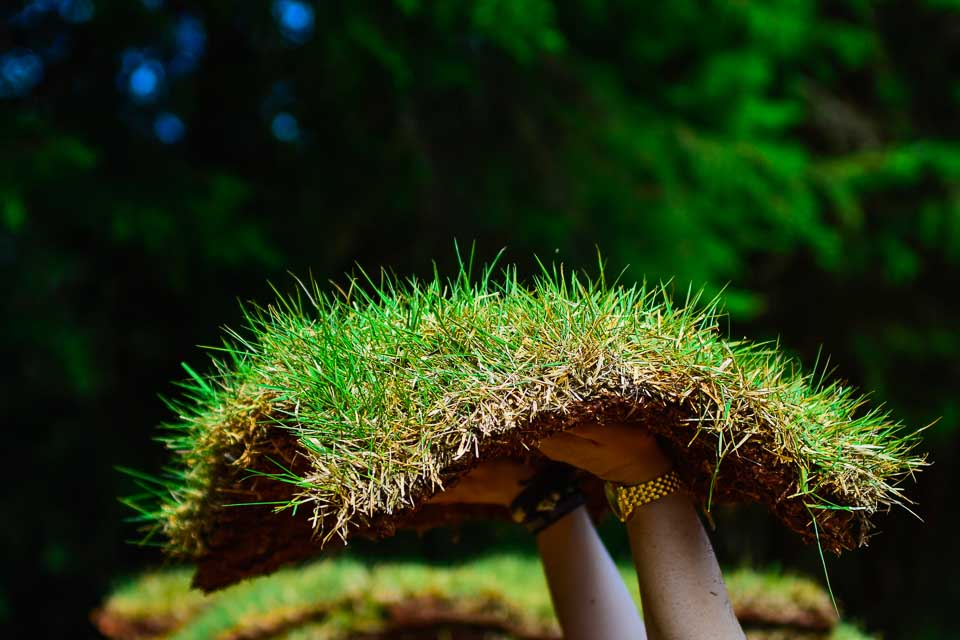
Carpet tile of 40 by 62.5 centimetres (16 in × 25 in)

Upkeep of Z. japonica varies based on uses, in general requiring a moderate level of nitrogen fertilizer to keep its density. Treatment should be planned for early spring or late fall. On average, it requires 1–1 1/2 inches (2.5–3.8 cm) of irrigation a week. Experts suggest that it is mown to a height of 1/2–2 1/2 inches (1.3–6.4 cm) every 5–10 days. Z. japonica is nearly resistant to disease, yet is subject to insect attack from white grubs. One major problem with Z. japonica in recreational landscapes is its seeding in spring, which is aesthetically unacceptable requiring additional maintenance costs. Brosnan et al., 2012 suppresses seedhead development with imidazolinones without killing the grass, and Patton et al., 2018 achieves the same result with ethephon. (Neither treatment has been tested or adapted for other Zoysia spp. however.)

== Cultivars ==
'El Toro' and 'Belair' are the newest cultivars of Z. japonica from the USDA. They are coarse, and have the ability to spread fast.

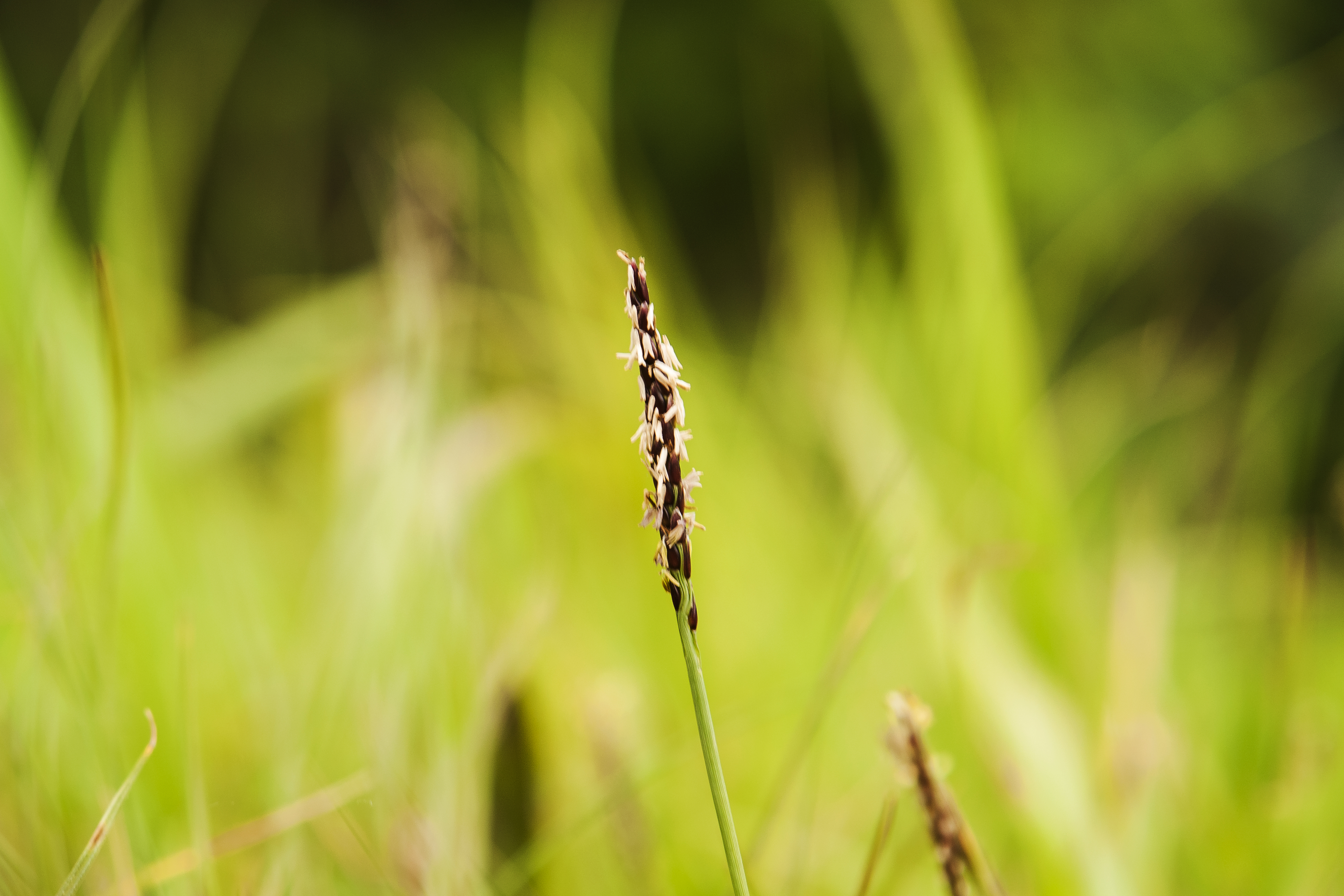

Other cultivars:

- Meyer
- Midwest
- Palisades
- JaMur
- Empire
- Zenith
- Compadre
- El Toro
- Zoysia Australis

== Uses ==
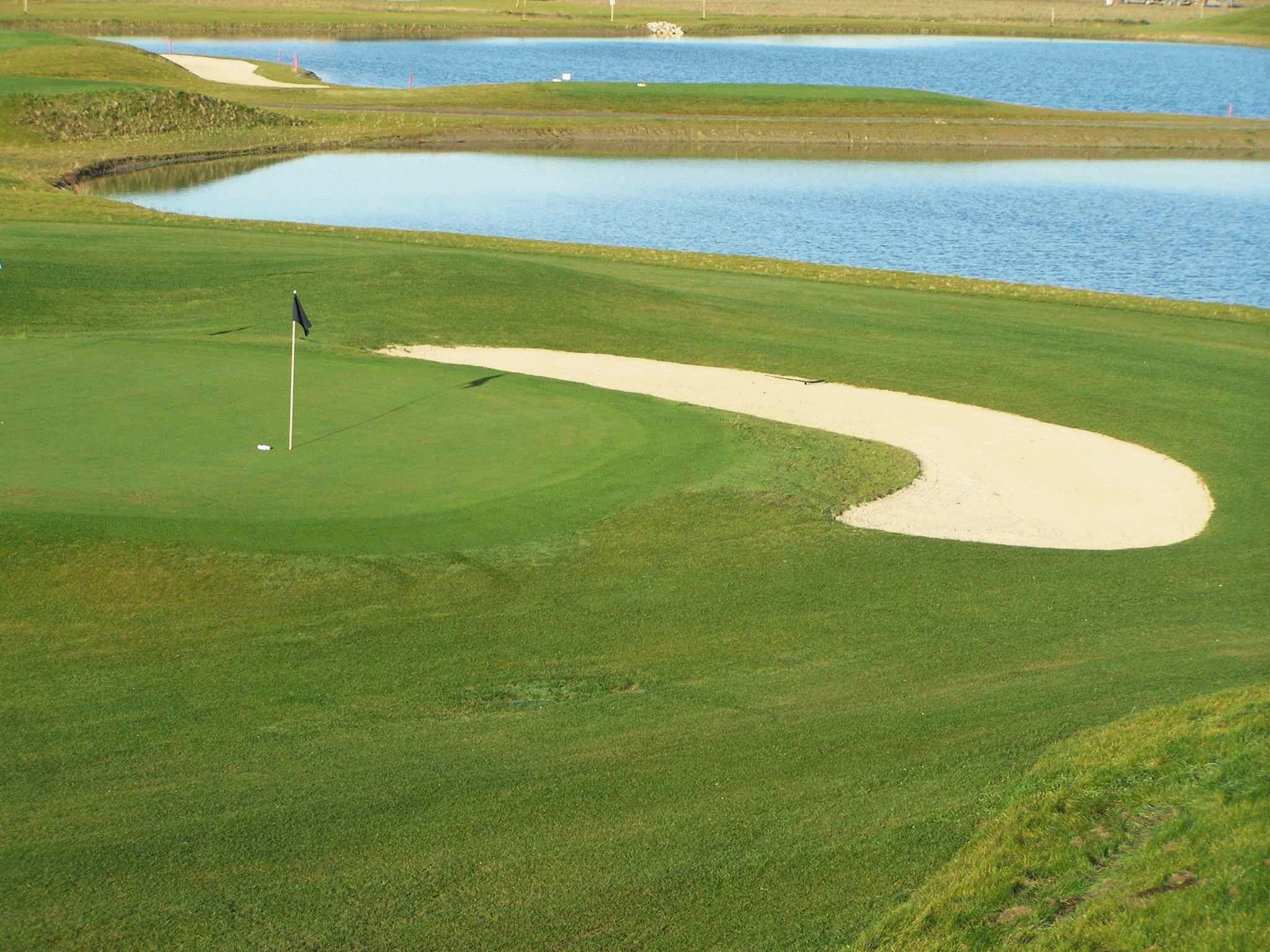

Zoysia japonica is most commonly used as turfgrass. It is often used on golf course fairways, teeing grounds, and roughs. It is also used for home lawns, parks, schoolyards, and athletic fields. Landscapers use Z. japonica as a buffer around flower beds or sand pits to keep invasive species out.

Some accounts have it being used for horse pastures in Japan, and for Christian burial tombs in Korea.

Zoysia japonica makes up a large part of sika deer diets. They graze on the seeds produced at the top of the grass. This has been widely observed on the island of Kinkasan in northeastern Japan.
