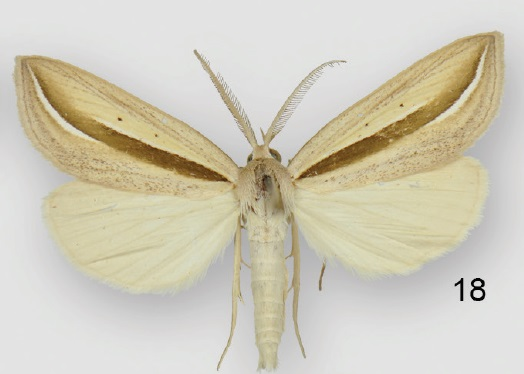
- Male
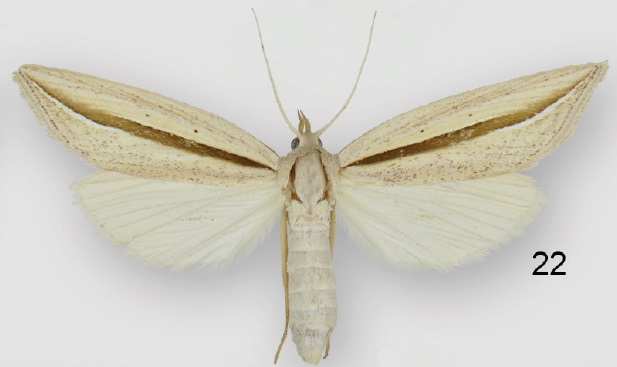
- Female

Scientific classification
- Domain: Eukaryota
- Kingdom: Animalia
- Phylum: Arthropoda
- Class: Insecta
- Order: Lepidoptera
- Superfamily: Noctuoidea
- Family: Erebidae
- Genus: Doryodes
- Species: D. broui

Binomial name
- Doryodes broui Lafontaine & Sullivan, 2015

= Doryodes broui =

Species of moth

Doryodes broui is a moth of the family Erebidae first described by J. Donald Lafontaine and James Bolling Sullivan in 2015. It is found in the United States from Alabama to southern Texas.

The length of the forewings is 13–15.5 mm for males and 13.5–17 mm for females. The forewings are buffy brown to whitish gray with faint buffy streaks, darker forms in colder months. The longitudinal stripe is dark brown, similar in width to that of Doryodes spadaria, narrower than for Doryodes latistriga, wider than for Doryodes tenuistriga. Adults occur throughout the year, but concentration of collecting dates suggests a primary brood between mid-March and mid-June and a secondary protracted brood between late July and mid-October

== Etymology ==
The species is named after Vernon A. Brou Jr. in recognition of his impressive and tireless efforts in collecting and researching the Lepidoptera of Louisiana.
