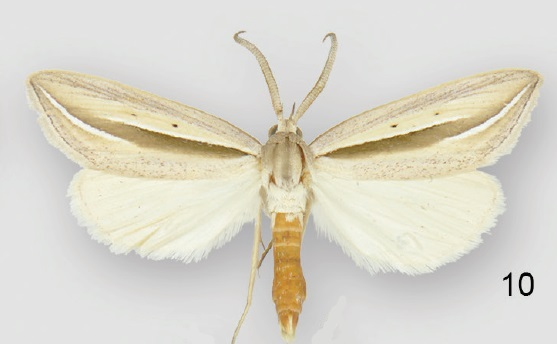
- Male
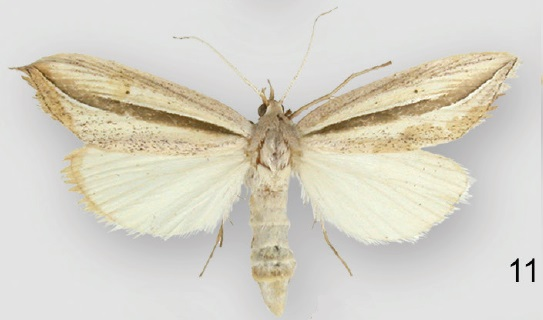
- Female

Scientific classification
- Domain: Eukaryota
- Kingdom: Animalia
- Phylum: Arthropoda
- Class: Insecta
- Order: Lepidoptera
- Superfamily: Noctuoidea
- Family: Erebidae
- Genus: Doryodes
- Species: D. fusselli

Binomial name
- Doryodes fusselli Sullivan & Lafontaine, 2015

= Doryodes fusselli =

Species of moth

Doryodes fusselli is a moth of the family Erebidae first described by J. Donald Lafontaine and James Bolling Sullivan in 2015. It is found in the US state of North Carolina, occurring from Dare County in the north to Brunswick and New Hanover counties in the south.

The length of the forewings is 12–17 mm for males and 16 mm for females. Adults are slightly larger than Doryodes bistrialis, but noticeably smaller (especially females) than Doryodes spadaria. The medial chocolate stripe on the forewing is broader than in D. bistrialis, but narrower than that of D. spadaria. Spring males are larger than those of the summer and fall generations, so they are more easily confused with D. spadaria. The hindwing is white, without the buff coloring of D. spadaria. In late summer some males of D. spadaria can have white hindwings, but size ranges for the two species do not overlap in this generation. The hindwings are white with a very faint buffy tone. Adults are on wing from April to October.

Larvae have been reared on the leaves of Spartina alterniflora and fresh and wilted Bermuda grass.

== Etymology ==
The species is named in honor of John Fussell from Morehead City, North Carolina, who has worked tirelessly for decades to describe and protect the unique flora and fauna of the North Carolina coastal plain, particularly the Croatan National Forest.
