= Dehnel =

Dehnel is a surname. Notable people with this surname include:

- August Dehnel (1903–1962), Polish biologist
- Jacek Dehnel (born 1980), Polish poet, writer, translator and painter
- Marian Dehnel (1880–1936), Polish physician, independence fighter, statesman
- Jacenty Dehnel (1911–1984), Polish military officer
- Wolfgang Dehnel (born 1945), German politician
