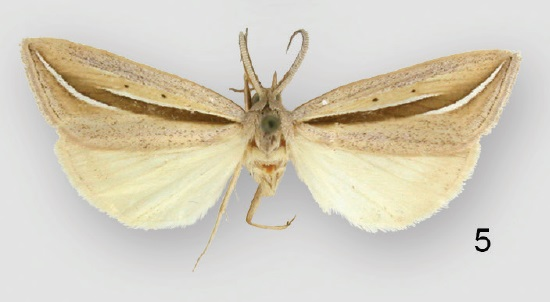

Scientific classification
- Domain: Eukaryota
- Kingdom: Animalia
- Phylum: Arthropoda
- Class: Insecta
- Order: Lepidoptera
- Superfamily: Noctuoidea
- Family: Erebidae
- Genus: Doryodes
- Species: D. okaloosa

Binomial name
- Doryodes okaloosa Sullivan & Lafontaine, 2015

= Doryodes okaloosa =

Species of moth

Doryodes okaloosa is a moth of the family Erebidae first described by J. Donald Lafontaine and James Bolling Sullivan in 2015. It is found in the US in Okaloosa County, Florida and likely ranges south in the coastal brackish marshes toward the St. Petersburg/Tampa area and to the west along the Florida coast.

The length of the forewings is 16.5 mm. The forewing stripe is dark brown, narrower than for Doryodes spadaria but wider than for Doryodes desoto. The forewing is wider and browner than in Doryodes spadaria and Doryodes desoto, but not as wide as in Doryodes reineckei, and the longitudinal stripe is sharply defined, unlike that of Doryodes reineckei. The hindwings are white with a buff tinge. Adults are on wing in January, February and July.

== Etymology ==
The species is named in honor of the Okaloosa, a tribe of the Creek Nation and longtime inhabitants of the area.
