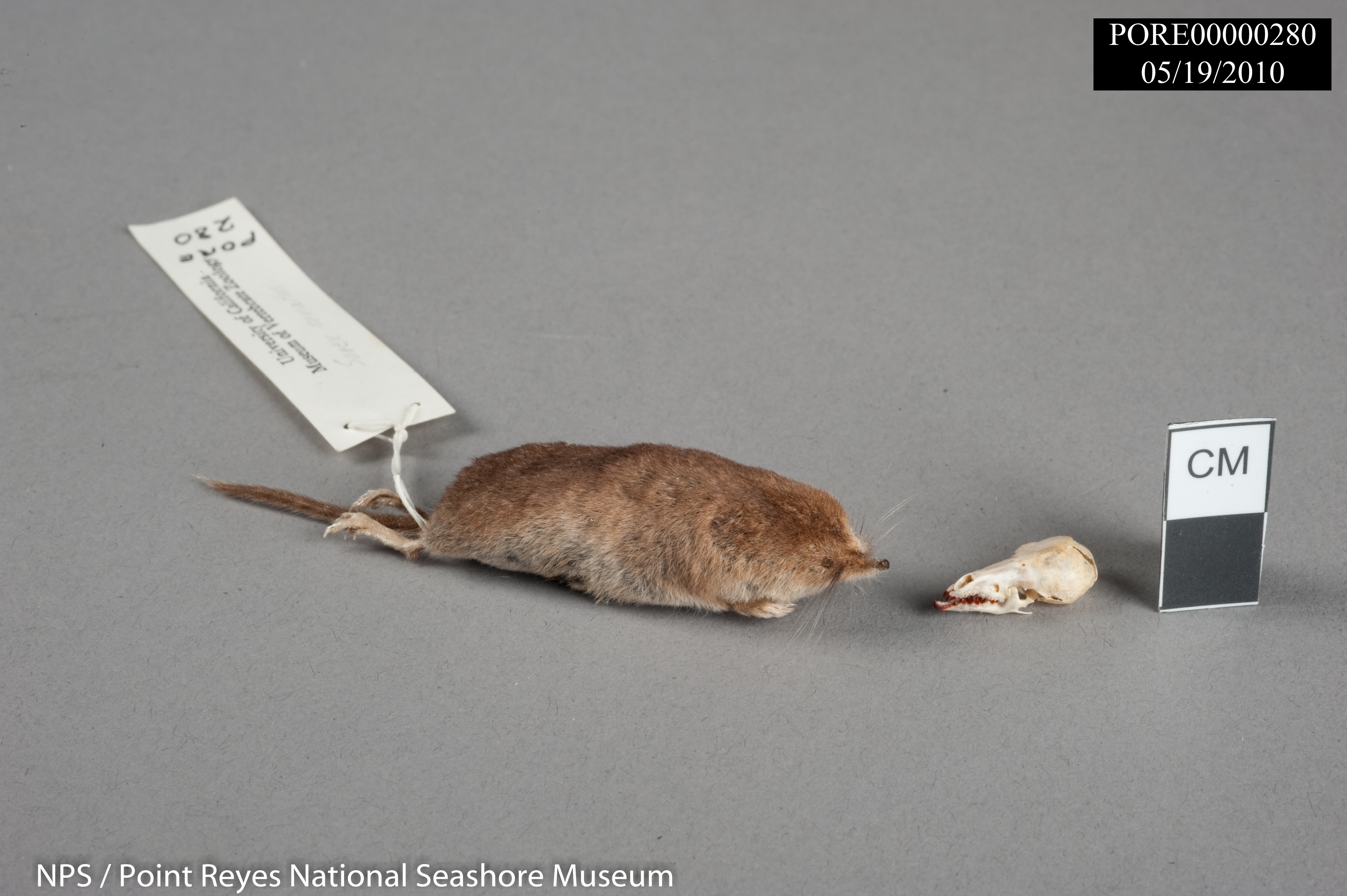
- A Sorex ornatus sinuosus specimen

Conservation status
- Critically Imperiled (NatureServe)

Scientific classification
- Kingdom: Animalia
- Phylum: Chordata
- Class: Mammalia
- Order: Eulipotyphla
- Family: Soricidae
- Genus: Sorex
- Species: S. ornatus
- Subspecies: S. o. sinuosus

Trinomial name
- Sorex ornatus sinuosus Grinnell, 1913

= Sorex ornatus sinuosus =

Subspecies of mammal

Sorex ornatus sinuosus, known commonly as the Suisun shrew or Suisun ornate shrew, is a subspecies of the ornate shrew that occurs in the tidal marshes of the northern shores of San Pablo and Suisun bays (northern arms of the San Francisco Bay, as far east as Grizzly Island and as far west as the mouth of Sonoma Creek in the vicinity of Tubbs Island). Brown and Rudd redefined the western boundary of the range from a prior designation of the Petaluma River. The Suisun shrew has been designated as a Species of Concern by the U.S. government and a Mammalian Species of Special Concern by the state of California.

== Morphology ==
Sorex ornatus sinuosus is a smallish rare subspecies of soricine shrew that is distinguished from other nearby and sympatric shrew taxa by having a darker pelage; its occurrence is strictly limited to tidal marshes near San Pablo and Suisun bays, which makes identification and differentiation straightforward. The body mass ranges from 4.5 to 6.8 grams, with a total length (including tail) of 98 to 106 mm; the tail structure itself is between 35 and 44 mm in length. Coloration is usually black, sometimes metallic. S. o. sinuosus has an elongated skull shape, that is relatively narrow and fragile

== Habitat ==
Sorex ornatus sinuosus occurs in tidal marshes characterized in order of decreasing tolerance to inundation by California cordgrass, Spartina foliosa; glasswort, Salicornia ambigua; and hairy gumweed, Grindelia cuneifolia, as well as brackish marshes dominated by California bulrush, Scirpus californicus, and common cattail, Typha latifolia. This animal needs dense, low-lying cover where small invertebrates are abundant. Structure of the plant community, not species diversity, is the greatest determinant in shrew occupancy. Invasive Smooth Cordgrass poses a risk to conservation due to providing very little horizontal structure, though it has fairly dense cover. Driftwood and other detritus above the mean high-tide line is required for nesting and foraging sites. Upland habitats, contiguous to the marshes, offering sufficient cover and sources of food to sustain shrews during prolonged flooding of marshes and dikes are also essential.

As recently as the mid-19th century, the San Pablo and Suisun bays were completely surrounded by salt and brackish water marshes, but by 1990, these wetlands were broken into a few small, isolated units. The marshes of Suisun Bay, chiefly consisting of the Napa Sonoma Marsh are the most expansive, but S. o. sinuosus populations there are threatened by human expansion and by management of the marshes to favor Scirpus. Current habitat area is comparatively much less in the San Pablo Bay marshland. Very few local extant tidal marshes have true undisturbed marsh vegetation, and even fewer border significant upland areas where marshland species can seek refuge from flooding. S. o. sinuosus inhabits a smaller range and is more limited in the habitats it occupies than is the salt marsh harvest mouse, for example.

== Behavior ==
A lifespan of 16 months is considered to apply to most shrew taxa, with females surviving slightly longer than males. Preferred food sources for this organism are small insects and other invertebrates. The normal birth season occurs during the spring and summer breeding season, with a typical gestation period of 21 days. The litter size may vary between two and nine individuals. While females are capable of producing two litters within a year, one is the norm. Another 21 days of altricial dependency occurs prior to weaning. Some individuals under 12 months in age breed in late summer. During winter, most shrews undergo a dramatic decrease in body mass, and second-year individuals typically die then. This wintertime body mass decrease is known as the Dehnel phenomenon, an adaptation to survive winter with lower food intake. In most species, winter body mass is 70% of first-year body mass and 50% of second-year body mass. Body length is correspondingly reduced due to the reduction of vertebral discs. The skull, kidneys, and some other internal organs are actually reduced in size so as to require less nutrition intake for survival. In the spring, shrews increase body mass and equilibrate to a slightly higher body mass than that of the previous summer. A large influx of mostly adult male shrews to the population locus occurs. Areal extent of the population can double. The once-stable winter home range mosaic is thereby disrupted, frequently resulting in intraspecific aggression. Breeding then begins anew, occurring in dense, harem-structured population foci within a narrow band of preferred habitat, from April through October. Young females often continue to live near their birthplace, while young males often disperse, due to the presence of other dominant males. The young males remain near their original colony, probably in suboptimal habitat. Research suggests that some social groups likely occur year-round, independent of the specific habitat site they inhabit.

== Conservation ==
Sorex ornatus sinuosus is a rare species afforded protection by the U.S. federal government and by the state of California. Besides designation as a Species of Special Concern, California has enacted the Suisun Marsh Preservation Act to establish specific protection measures for this habitat of S. o. sinuosus, as well as the California clapper rail, salt marsh harvest mouse, and other sensitive species. Many marsh protection items serve to protect a variety of organisms, some of which are threatened and some of which are relatively more common.
