= Invasive grasses in Brazil =

Nonnative grasses that are invasive in Brazil include Arundo donax, Rottboellia cochinchinensis, Cortaderia selloana, Nassella neesiana, Spartina densiflora, and Spartina alterniflora. These species have been identified and are being managed by the Ministry of Environment and Forest.

== Attributes ==
An alien grass may be considered an invasive species if:

1. it can be transported by different types of delivery systems, such as vehicle, boats, seed contamination, feed, etc.
2. it is able to establish homeostasis and is able to tolerate the environment it settled in long enough to adapt and reproduce
3. it has the ability to coexist with or outcompete native plants.

Invasive grasses in the Mojave desert in California were found to mostly populate areas with a higher concentration of CO_{2}, making them particularly suited for human-modified environments.

== Species ==
Arundo donax is a giant reed that invades riparian areas. Arundo donax is known to alter hydrology, nutrient cycling, and the fire regime of Brazilian ecology. All of these are characteristics of displacement of native species.

Rottboellia cochinchinensis is a popular plant species found in the rural and grassland areas of Brazil. It is an erect annual grass that reaches heights of 4 metres. It is a weed of the warm-season crops, all around the world. This species of plant prefers the tropical and subtropical climates, which lead to its success in Brazil. This plant species typically will grow along the roadsides and in other, well-drained sites. Rottboellia cochinensis is very aggressive in growth and is able to be well adapted, which makes it such a successful invasive species.

Cortaderia selloana is a tall tussock grass that can grow a height of 4 meters. This species is found in the subtropical regions in habitats that have been disturbed. This species is commonly found along roads and trails, where human impact occurs frequently. Cortaderia selloana forms dense stands that can exclude other plant species. Cortaderia selloana can become a fire hazard and exhibit sharp leaves that can cut epidermally and limit recreational use. Epidermal cuts can cause serious injuries on animals from direct contact.

Nassella neesiana, a common invasive plant species in Brazil, is found within agricultural dense areas. This is in direct relation with human activity. The speed of distribution of this plant species is alarmingly high, which is why it is such a threat as an invasive species.

Spartina densiflora is an invasive species of cordgrass that primarily inhabits marsh and wetland habitats. This type of plant species is extremely aggressive and is capable of outcompeting various native plants in Brazil. The rapid growth rate and lack of dormancy period contributes to S. densiflora successful invasive patterns within Brazil.

The plant species Spartina alterniflora is a species that inhabits march habitats in its native range. It is invasive to Brazil, but can be found in surrounding countries due to its ability to hybridize with native non-invasive species. Spartina alterniflora can have a negative effect on native species including some endangered species. Spartina alterniflora is known, once hybridized, to increase vigor and growth rates through other Spartina species.

== Impacts ==
Invasive grass can influence native plants by dissipating their nutrient supply, as well as causing an imbalance within the ecosystem's infrastructure. An example of a negative influence would be Eragrostis plana, considered to be one of the most problematic invasive grass in Brazil, causing negative effects on native vegetation by outcompeting the residents of the specific area. Research has shown that E. plana has not only eliminated most native grass and covered up most of South Brazil's grassland, but it has also altered the plant richness and genetic makeup of plants that are able to coexist with E. plana.

Nassella neesiana is known to threaten the ecological integrity of Brazilian pastures, along with causing devastation in agricultural areas. This all being due to the reduction in pasture palatability and the direct damage to stock.

== Management and control ==
The attempt of controlling and preventing the growth of invasive grass would substantially improve the state of neighboring organisms, however it has proven quite difficult to achieve. Recent studies have examined whether the presence of the disturbance of these forms of grasses have caused the extinction of native species in Brazil. Grass covering Asteraceae, one of the main grasses in Brazilian Cerrado, had significant results regarding its abundance and density.

There are many different methods of controlling invasive species, whether it being through physical force or mechanically with specialized technology. For example, in Parque Nacional de Brasília (National Park of Brasilia), two methods of control management were tested to determine what could possibly remove the invasive outbreaks of Melinis minutiflora. The first method was extinguishing with fire, which was not sufficient to control, let alone remove, the grass. The second method tested involved a combination of fire, herbicide sprays and manual removal, the conductors calling it “integrated management”. Integrated management resulted in a less than 1% reduction of the grasses over the span of years, maintaining a small-scale improvement throughout the study. Although this strategy worked to control M. minutiflora, it is not significant enough to consider since the recolonization and growth rate dominates the process of integrated management.
