= Sporobolus × townsendii =

Scientific classification
- Kingdom: Plantae
- Clade: Tracheophytes
- Clade: Angiosperms
- Clade: Monocots
- Clade: Commelinids
- Order: Poales
- Family: Poaceae
- Subfamily: Chloridoideae
- Genus: Sporobolus
- Section: S. sect. Spartina
- Species: S. × townsendii

Binomial name
- Sporobolus × townsendii (H.Groves & J.Groves) P.M.Peterson & Saarela

Synonyms
- Spartina stricta subsp. townsendii (H.Groves & J.Groves) Rouy; Spartina stricta var. townsendii (H.Groves & J.Groves) Husn.; Spartina × neyrautii Foucaud; Spartina × townsendii H.Groves & J.Groves

Species of plant

Sporobolus × townsendii, synonyms including Spartina × townsendii, known as Townsend's cordgrass, is a hybrid species of flowering plant in the grass family Poaceae. It is native to Western Europe.

== Taxonomy ==
The species was first collected in 1870 at Hythe on the edge of Southampton Water in the south of England. It was formally described in 1881 as Spartina townsendii. The specific epithet refers to Frederick Townsend, the author of the 1883 Flora of Hampshire.

It is believed to be a hybrid species between a female Sporobolus alterniflorus and a male S. maritimus (syn. Spartina stricta).

Analysis of root-tip cells has revealed that this plant has 126 chromosomes.

== Distribution and use ==
After its discovery in southern England, it was reported that it had spread very rapidly, until by 1907 "many thousands of acres" along the English south coast were covered with it, and it had crossed the English Channel and spread along the French coast. It had also been planted in the Netherlands because of its ability to prevent coastal erosion. As of March 2026, it has been introduced elsewhere western Europe (Belgium, Denmark, France, Germany, Great Britain, Ireland, Italy, and Spain) as well as in northwestern America (British Columbia and Washington), Australia (South Australia and Victoria), and New Zealand.
