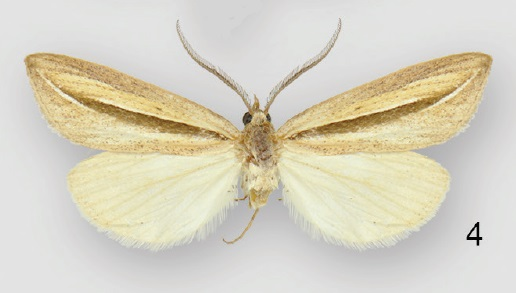

Scientific classification
- Domain: Eukaryota
- Kingdom: Animalia
- Phylum: Arthropoda
- Class: Insecta
- Order: Lepidoptera
- Superfamily: Noctuoidea
- Family: Erebidae
- Genus: Doryodes
- Species: D. desoto

Binomial name
- Doryodes desoto Lafontaine & Sullivan, 2015

= Doryodes desoto =

Species of moth

Doryodes desoto is a moth of the family Erebidae first described by J. Donald Lafontaine and James Bolling Sullivan in 2015. It is found along the Gulf Coast of the US state of Florida between Sarasota County and Gulf County. The habitat consists of coastal salt marshes.

The length of the forewings is 16 mm. The forewings are whitish buff with slightly darker buff and pale-gray streaks and a prominent blackish-brown stripe along the middle of the wing, curving upward and tapered at about three-fourths from the base. The stripe is narrower than for Doryodes spadaria and Doryodes okaloosa, but wider than for Doryodes bistrialis. The stripe is bordered by a narrow white line above extending to three-fourths from the base, and with a similar white line below the stripe extending from above the forewing tornus almost to the wing apex. The hindwings are white with a very faint buffy tone. Adults are on wing in January, February and July.

== Etymology ==
The species is named after Ft. De Soto Park, Florida.
