= S. bakeri =

S. bakeri may refer to:

- Sericulus bakeri, the fire-maned bowerbird, a bowerbird
- Spartina bakeri, the sand cordgrass, a plant species in the genus Spartina

== See also ==
- Bakeri (disambiguation)
