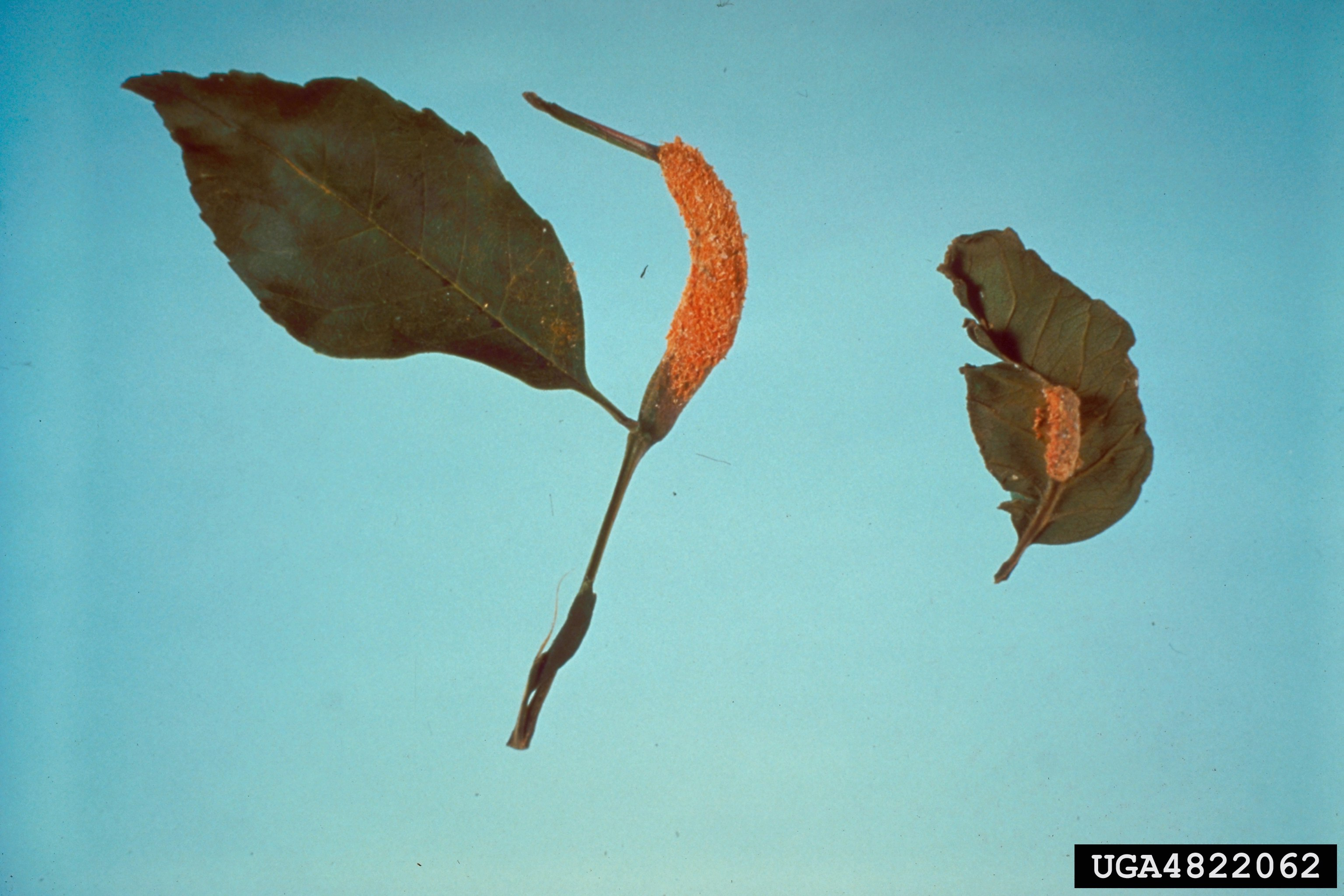

Scientific classification
- Domain: Eukaryota
- Kingdom: Fungi
- Division: Basidiomycota
- Class: Pucciniomycetes
- Order: Pucciniales
- Family: Pucciniaceae
- Genus: Puccinia
- Species: P. sparganioides

Binomial name
- Puccinia sparganioides Ellis & Barthol.

= Puccinia sparganioides =

Species of fungus

Puccinia sparganioides is a parasitic fungus that causes rust disease on plants, including Spartina alterniflora.
