= František Jozef Turček =

Slovak ecologist and zoologist

František Jozef Turček (1915–1977) was a Slovak biologist whose work contributed to the development of ecology and zoology in former Czechoslovakia. His research was among the early Slovak contributions to ecological science, and it received recognition both domestically and internationally.

Turček did not complete formal secondary-school education but pursued scientific work independently. From 1946 to 1964, he worked at the Forestry Research Institute in Banská Štiavnica. His relationship with the Communist authorities during this period was strained, which affected his position at the institute. In 1964, he joined the Slovak Academy of Science, where he continued his research activities.

Turček authored 13 books and published more than 450 research papers in Czechoslovak and international journals, including German, Hungarian, Swedish, British, American, Indian, and Japanese publications. He corresponded with several ecologists of the period, such as Balogh, Dehnel, Formozov, Kendeigh, Novikov, Pinowski, and Tischler. He was a member or corresponding fellow of multiple scientific organizations, including the Magyar Madártani Intézet, British Ornithologists' Union, American Ornithologists' Union, International Union of Applied Ornithology, Deutsche Gesellschaft für Säugetierkunde, and the Cooper Ornithological Society. In 1964, the Academy of Zoology in Agra (India), appointed him as vice-president.
