= Prokelisia =

Scientific classification
- Domain: Eukaryota
- Kingdom: Animalia
- Phylum: Arthropoda
- Class: Insecta
- Order: Hemiptera
- Suborder: Auchenorrhyncha
- Infraorder: Fulgoromorpha
- Family: Delphacidae
- Subfamily: Delphacinae
- Genus: Prokelisia; Osborn, 1905

Genus of true bugs

Prokelisia is a genus of delphacid planthoppers in the family Delphacidae. There are about five described species in Prokelisia.

== Species ==
These five species belong to the genus Prokelisia:

- Prokelisia carolae Wilson, 1982
- Prokelisia crocea (Van Duzee, 1897)
- Prokelisia dolus Wilson, 1982
- Prokelisia marginata (Van Duzee, 1897)
- Prokelisia salina (Ball, 1902)
