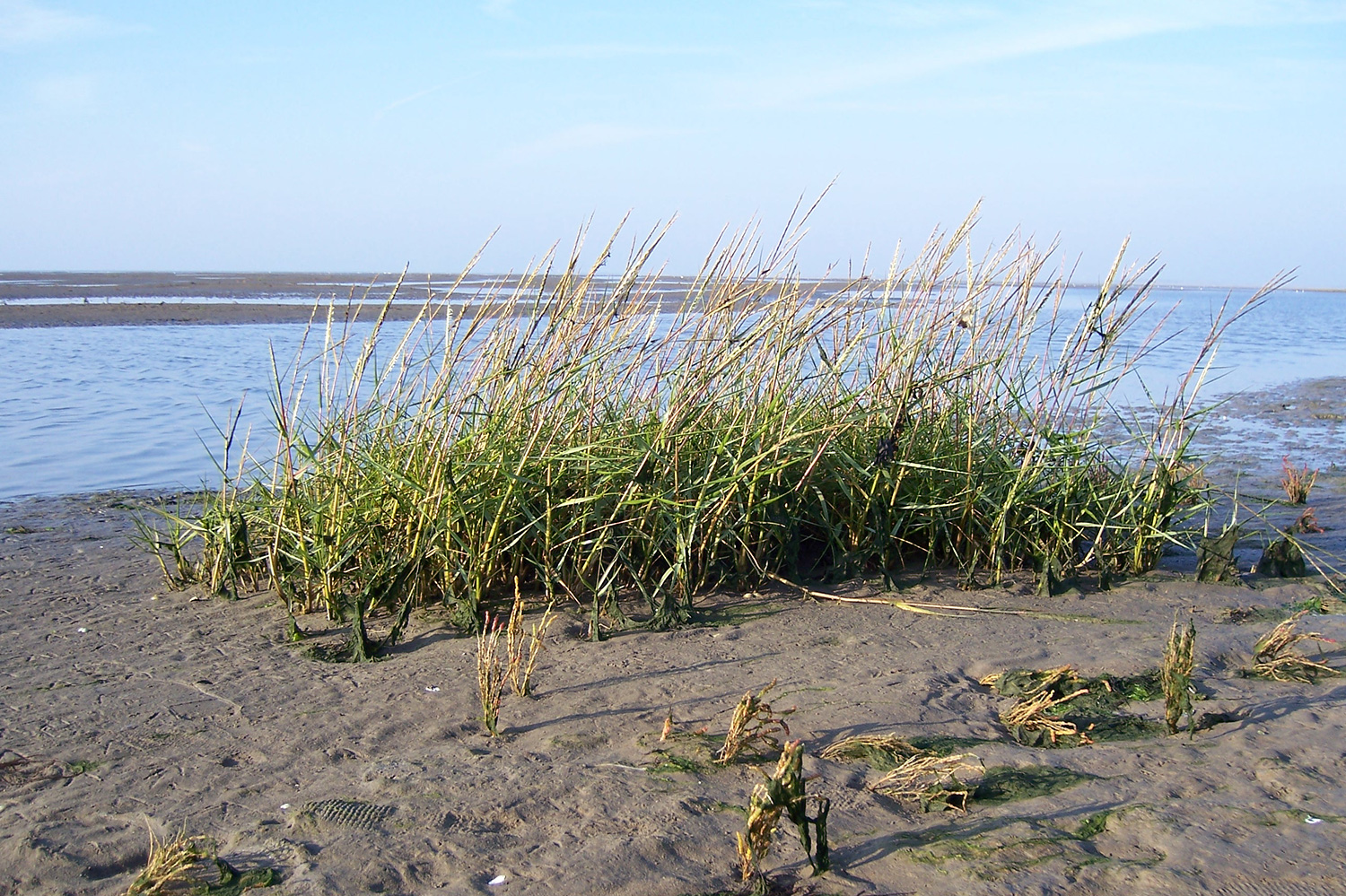

Scientific classification
- Kingdom: Plantae
- Clade: Tracheophytes
- Clade: Angiosperms
- Clade: Monocots
- Clade: Commelinids
- Order: Poales
- Family: Poaceae
- Subfamily: Chloridoideae
- Genus: Sporobolus
- Section: Spartina
- Species: S. anglicus

Binomial name
- Sporobolus anglicus (C.E.Hubb.) P.M.Peterson & Saarela

Synonyms
- Spartina anglica C.E.Hubb.; Spartina × townsendii var. anglica (C.E.Hubb.) Lambinon & Maquet

= Sporobolus anglicus =

Species of grass

Sporobolus anglicus (common cordgrass) is a hybrid-derived species of cordgrass that originated in southern England in about 1870 and is a neonative species in Britain. It was reclassified as Sporobolus anglicus after a taxonomic revision in 2014, but its previous name, Spartina anglica is still in common usage. It is an allotetraploid species derived from the hybrid Sporobolus × townsendii, which arose when the European native cordgrass Sporobolus maritimus (small cordgrass) hybridized with the introduced American Sporobolus alterniflorus (smooth cordgrass).

Common cordgrass is a herbaceous perennial plant growing 0.4–1.3 metres (1–4 ft) tall. Its foliage consists of round stems that are yellowish green in spring and summer, and turns light brown in autumn and winter. The leaves are 20–60 centimetres (8–24 in) long, and 1.5 centimetres (1/2 in) broad at the base, tapering to a point. It produces flowers and seeds on only one side of the stem. The flowers are a yellowish-green, turning brown by the winter.

== Invasive problems ==
Sporobolus anglicus was at first seen as a valuable species for coastal erosion control. Its dense root systems bind coastal mud and the stems increase silt deposition, thereby assisting in land reclamation from the sea. It was widely planted at coastal sites throughout the British Isles, and has colonized large areas of tidal mudflats, becoming an invasive species. New colonies may take some time to become established, but once they do, vegetative spread by rhizomes is rapid, smothering natural ecosystems and preventing birds such as waders from feeding. In some areas, however, a natural dieback of unknown cause has reversed the spread, and artificial control is no longer necessary where this dieback has occurred.

Sporobolus anglicus has also been introduced to Asia, Australia, New Zealand and North America, where it has proved to be a serious invasive species causing extensive damage to natural saltmarsh ecosystems in many areas.

== Ecological Impacts ==
Sporobolus anglicus has had significant ecological impacts on coastal ecosystems where it has become established as an invasive species. The rapid spread of this species has had serious consequences for biodiversity and ecosystem dynamics. For example, in Europe, where it emerged as a hybrid between S. alterniflora and S. maritima, its ability to spread vegetatively via rhizomes has allowed it to colonize large areas of marshland, displacing native species and altering habitat structure.[6] This species not only competes for resources, but also modifies environmental conditions, such as salinity and sediment texture, which negatively affects benthic macrofaunal communities.[7]

Sporobolus anglicus has successfully displaced native species in different coastal ecosystems, where its rapid expansion has altered the composition and structure of biological communities. This invasive species competes effectively with native flora and fauna, modifying habitat conditions and reducing biodiversity. For example, in China, although S. anglicus initially expanded, its decline in the face of S. alterniflora highlights how competition between invasive species can influence their success. However, both species have displaced native plants such as Phragmites australis, affecting wetland structure and resource availability for other species. [8] In Australia, the invasion of S. anglicus has reduced the richness and diversity of benthic macrofauna by 50%, with a particularly marked decline in molluscs and crustaceans. This change in species composition is due, in part, to the dense network of roots and rhizomes of S. anglicus, which makes it difficult for the infauna to excavate, and to increased shade which reduces the growth of microphytobenthos, affecting the epifauna. [7] Also, in the mudflats of northwest Tasmania, S. anglicus has altered fish habitat, reducing the diversity and abundance of species such as Atherinosoma microstoma, suggesting a negative impact on the function of these areas as nurseries for juveniles. [9] In the northwest Adriatic, S. anglicus and S. townsendii have almost completely replaced the native species Spartina maritima, a process that went unnoticed for decades. This displacement has transformed the marshes, affecting not only the native vegetation, but also the associated communities that depend on it.[10]

== Disruption of biogeochemical cycles ==
The introduction of Sporobolus anglicus significantly alters biogeochemical cycles in coastal ecosystems, impacting nutrient dynamics and microbial communities. In the Han River estuary in the Yellow Sea, S. anglicus has been found to have ten times the below-ground biomass of the native plant Suaeda japonica. This leads to an increase in the release of dissolved organic matter and generates more oxidized conditions in the sediments, which in turn increases microbial activity, including processes such as organic carbon oxidation and iron and sulphate reduction. In sediments dominated by S. anglicus, sulphate reduction becomes the main anaerobic respiration pathway, while in the rhizosphere, iron reduction is significant. This dense root system accelerates iron recycling. Microbial communities are also affected, favoring bacteria involved in iron and sulfur reduction[11]. These changes impact nutrient availability and biological composition, posing a threat to coastal wetlands.

== Control and management ==
Control and management methods include a combination of physical, chemical and biological techniques. Among the physical methods, soil tillage has been shown to be effective in reducing the biomass, cover and stem density of S. anglicus. For example, in coastal wetlands, tillage twice a year reduced biomass by 32% and stem density by 83%, which was more effective than repeated cutting of the plant. [12] As for chemical methods, the use of herbicides has been widely implemented, although with mixed results. In Australia, herbicide treatment significantly reduced S. anglicus cover, but did not achieve complete eradication. Furthermore, although herbicide treatment allowed some recovery of native vegetation, it also negatively affected the benthic macrofauna, whose density and diversity initially declined before showing signs of recovery in subsequent years.[13] In China, herbicides have been developed specifically for Spartina, such as Micaojing, which decomposes below-ground biomass in 60 days and kills above-ground vegetation in 21 days. However, its large-scale use has not been approved due to environmental and safety concerns. Other strategies include freshwater flooding, which has been shown to be effective in controlling the spread of S. anglicus by reducing soil salinity and limiting its growth. [8] In San Francisco Bay, California, the Invasive Spartina Project has reduced invasive hybrid cover by 96% through herbicide application and other control measures, although challenges remain in protecting endangered species, such as the California Ridgway's rail, which depends on habitats created by S. anglicus[6].

== Impact of climate change ==
Climate change is significantly influencing the expansion and distribution of S. anglicus, which has demonstrated a remarkable ability to adapt to changing environmental conditions. Recent studies suggest that rising temperatures and changes in precipitation patterns may favor the expansion of this species, especially towards higher latitudes in the northern hemisphere. For example, species distribution models project that S. anglicus may expand its range under more severe climate scenarios, benefiting from warmer and drier conditions that facilitate its growth. This expansion not only increases its presence in already invaded areas, such as northern Europe and the coasts of East Asia, but could also intensify its impact on vulnerable coastal ecosystems.[14] Also, climate change is altering the dynamics of salt marsh habitats, where S. anglicus competes with native species. In the Adriatic Sea, increasing temperatures and decreasing precipitation have been observed to favor the expansion of annual species such as Salicornia veneta, while S. anglicus shows increased tolerance to flooding and drought conditions. However, the combination of these stressors could weaken S. anglicus in the long term, especially if soil moisture is reduced and decomposition of organic matter increases, affecting its root system.[15] Despite this, S. anglicus remains more resilient than many native species, allowing it to maintain its dominance in invaded areas.

== See also ==
- Invasive grasses of North America
