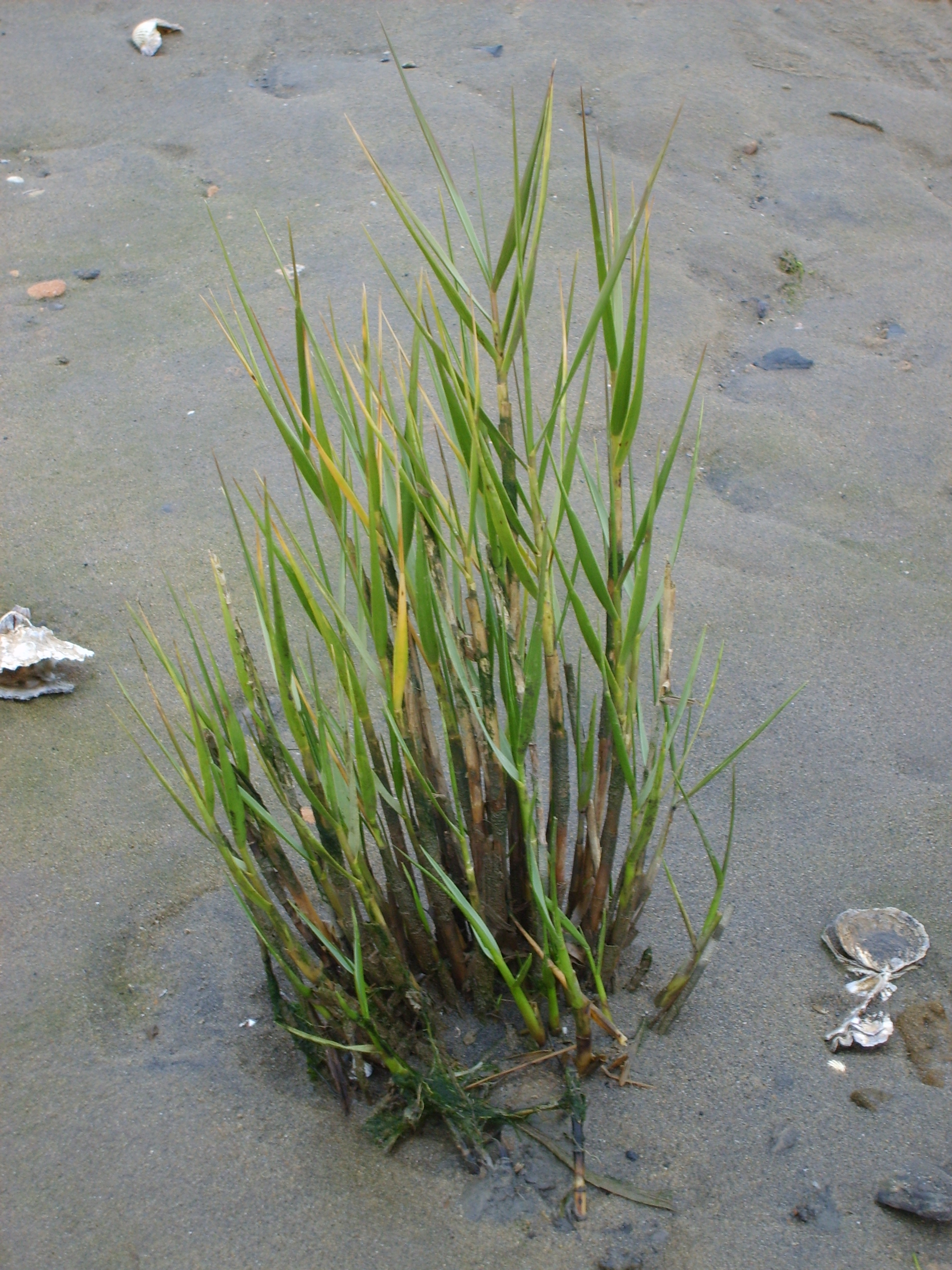

Scientific classification
- Kingdom: Plantae
- Clade: Tracheophytes
- Clade: Angiosperms
- Clade: Monocots
- Clade: Commelinids
- Order: Poales
- Family: Poaceae
- Subfamily: Chloridoideae
- Genus: Sporobolus
- Section: Spartina
- Species: S. maritimus

Binomial name
- Sporobolus maritimus (Curtis) P.M.Peterson & Saarela

Synonyms
- List: Cynodon pungens Raspail; Dactylis maritima Curtis; Dactylis stricta Aiton; Limnetis pungens Rich.; Paspalum strictum (Aiton) Brot.; Poa ternitana Spreng. ex Link; Rottboellia stricta (Aiton) Steud.; Spartina capensis Nees; Spartina intermedia Bosc ex St.-Yves; Spartina maritima (Curtis) Fernald; Spartina pungens P.Beauv.; Spartina schreberi J.F.Gmel.; Spartina stricta (Aiton) Roth; Trachynotia stricta (Aiton) DC.

= Sporobolus maritimus =

Species of grass

Sporobolus maritimus, or synonymously as Spartina maritima, the small cordgrass, is a species of cordgrass native to the coasts of western and southern Europe and western Africa, from the Netherlands west across southern England to southern Ireland, and south along the Atlantic coast to Morocco and also on the Mediterranean Sea coasts. There is also a disjunct population on the Atlantic coasts of Namibia and South Africa.

== Description ==
Sporobolus maritimus is a coarse, robust, herbaceous perennial plant growing gregariously from a creeping rootstock. The plant is 20 to 70 cm (8 to 28 in) tall, green in spring and summer, and turning light brown in autumn and winter. The leaves are slender, 10 to 40 cm (4 to 16 in) long, and 0.5 to 1 cm (0.2 to 0.4 in) broad at the base, tapering to a blunt point. The inflorescence is a group of two or three unbranched spikes up to 15 cm (6 in) long, each with several unstalked, one-flowered, downy spikelets about 1.25 cm (0.5 in) long, which are produced on all sides of the stalk and closely pressed against it. The pointed stem tip does not overtop the highest spikelet. The flowers are greenish, turning yellowish-brown by the winter.

== Distribution and habitat ==
Sporobolus maritimus is native to the west-facing coasts of Europe and North Africa. It occupies a range of habitats including very soft mud and shingle, in minimally exposed areas, away from strong wave action. It occurs on the seaward margins of saltmarshes and creeks and may be plentiful in dried up pools in the upper parts of saltmarshes. In the British Isles, it occurs in estuaries in Essex and in the Solent.

== Hybridisation and decline ==
When the related American species Sporobolus alterniflorus (smooth cordgrass) was introduced to southern England in about 1870, it hybridised with S. maritimus to give the hybrid Sporobolus × townsendii. This then gave rise to a new allotetraploid species Sporobolus anglicus (common cordgrass), which is much more vigorous, and has now largely ousted S. maritimus from much of its native range in Western Europe.
