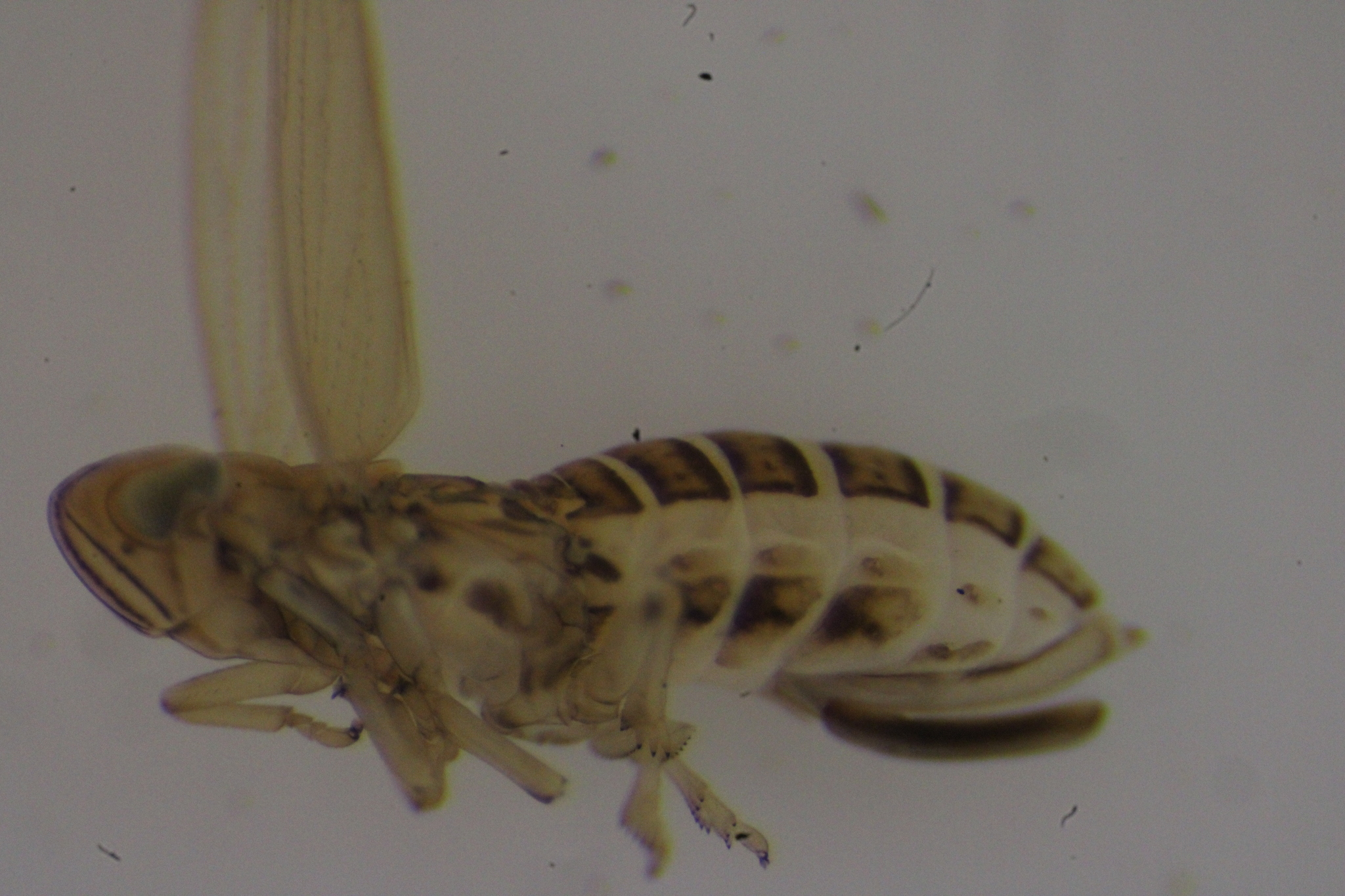

Scientific classification
- Domain: Eukaryota
- Kingdom: Animalia
- Phylum: Arthropoda
- Class: Insecta
- Order: Hemiptera
- Suborder: Auchenorrhyncha
- Infraorder: Fulgoromorpha
- Family: Delphacidae
- Genus: Prokelisia
- Species: P. dolus

Binomial name
- Prokelisia dolus Wilson, 1982

= Prokelisia dolus =

Species of true bug

Prokelisia dolus is a species of delphacid planthopper in the family Delphacidae. It is found in North America.
