= Mammal Research =

Peer-reviewed academic journal

- Discipline: mammalogy
- Language: English
- Edited by: Karol Zub

Publication details
- Former name: Acta Theriologica
- Publisher: Springer Verlag GmbH (Poland)
- Frequency: quarterly
- Open access: Yes
- License: CC BY 4.0

Standard abbreviations
- ISO 4: Mammal Res.

Indexing
- ISSN: 2199-2401 (print); 2199-241X (web)

Links
- Journal homepage

Mammal Research is a quarterly peer-reviewed scientific journal published by Springer Science+Business Media in partnership with the Mammal Research Institute of the Polish Academy of Sciences. The editor-in-chief is Karol Zub. The journal was first published under the name Acta Theriologica in January 1955. It retained this name until the publication of its 60th volume in 2015, at which time it took on the name Mammal Research. August Dehnel, Polish professor of zoology, was the journal's founder. It was originally published through the Institute of Zoology of the Polish Academy of Sciences, though this was supplanted by the Mammal Research Institute in 1958. Publication transferred to Springer in January 2011.

== Abstracting and indexing ==
The journal is abstracted and indexed in:

- Biological Abstracts
- BIOSIS Previews
- Current Contents/Agriculture, Biology & Environmental Sciences
- EBSCO databases
- Essential Science Indicators
- GEOBASE
- ProQuest databases
- Science Citation Index Expanded
- Scopus
- The Zoological Record

According to the Journal Citation Reports, the journal has a 2024 impact factor of 1.6.

== See also ==
- List of mammalogy journals
