= Prokelisia marginata =

Scientific classification
- Domain: Eukaryota
- Kingdom: Animalia
- Phylum: Arthropoda
- Class: Insecta
- Order: Hemiptera
- Suborder: Auchenorrhyncha
- Infraorder: Fulgoromorpha
- Family: Delphacidae
- Genus: Prokelisia
- Species: P. marginata

Binomial name
- Prokelisia marginata (Van Duzee, 1897)

Species of true bug

Prokelisia marginata is a species of delphacid planthopper in the family Delphacidae. It is found in North America.

P. marginata can be found in salt marshes where it grazes on Spartina alterniflora.
