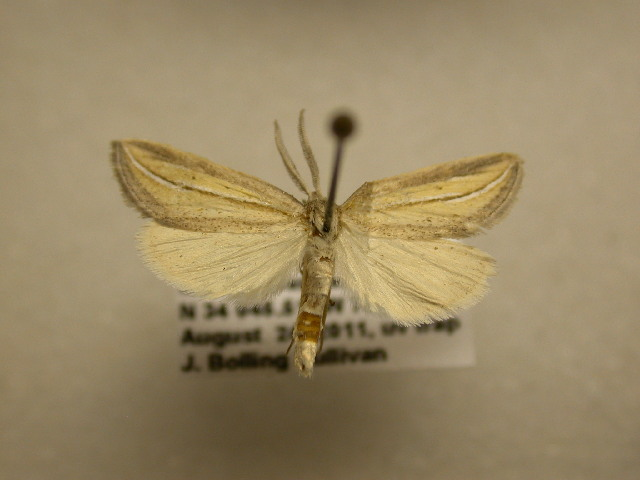

Scientific classification
- Domain: Eukaryota
- Kingdom: Animalia
- Phylum: Arthropoda
- Class: Insecta
- Order: Lepidoptera
- Superfamily: Noctuoidea
- Family: Erebidae
- Tribe: Euclidiini
- Genus: Doryodes; Guenée, 1857

Synonyms
- Themma Walker, 1863; Tunza Walker, 1863

= Doryodes =

Genus of moths

Doryodes is a genus of moths in the family Erebidae.

== Species ==
- Doryodes bistrialis (Geyer, 1832)
- Doryodes broui Lafontaine & Sullivan, 2015
- Doryodes desoto Lafontaine & Sullivan, 2015
- Doryodes fusselli Sullivan & Lafontaine, 2015
- Doryodes insularia Hampson, 1904
- Doryodes latistriga Sullivan & Lafontaine, 2015
- Doryodes okaloosa Sullivan & Lafontaine, 2015
- Doryodes reineckei Sullivan & Lafontaine, 2015
- Doryodes spadaria Guenée, 1857
- Doryodes tenuistriga Barnes & McDunnough, 1918

== Former species ==
- Doryodes grandipennis Barnes & McDunnough, 1918
