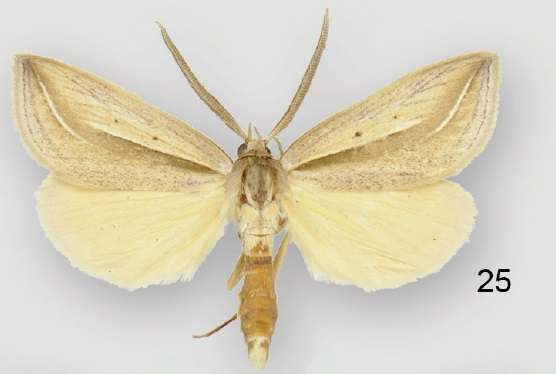
- Male
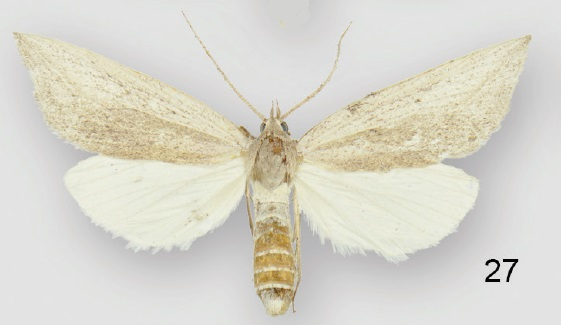
- Female

Scientific classification
- Domain: Eukaryota
- Kingdom: Animalia
- Phylum: Arthropoda
- Class: Insecta
- Order: Lepidoptera
- Superfamily: Noctuoidea
- Family: Erebidae
- Genus: Doryodes
- Species: D. reineckei

Binomial name
- Doryodes reineckei Sullivan & Lafontaine, 2015

= Doryodes reineckei =

Species of moth

Doryodes reineckei is a moth of the family Erebidae first described by J. Donald Lafontaine and James Bolling Sullivan in 2015. It is found along the US Gulf Coast in the western panhandle of Florida along to eastern Texas. The habitat consists of Spartina marshes.

The length of the forewings is 15–17 mm for males and 17–20 mm for females. The forewings are pale brown to dark gray brown, with darker forms in colder months. There is a longitudinal dark stripe paler and less sharply defined than in other species, the lower margin of stripe blending into darker ground color below it. The wing margin is more rounded than in other species. Adults are on wing from April to August, but it is likely on the wing throughout the year.

== Etymology ==
The species is named for John P. Reinecke, a retired USDA entomologist who worked in Mississippi and developed insect organ culture techniques and detailed the anatomy of the hindgut of larval Lepidoptera.
