= Tule shrew =

Conservation status
- Extinct (1905)

Scientific classification
- Kingdom: Animalia
- Phylum: Chordata
- Class: Mammalia
- Order: Eulipotyphla
- Family: Soricidae
- Genus: Sorex
- Species: S. ornatus
- Subspecies: †S. o. juncensis

Trinomial name
- †Sorex ornatus juncensis Nelson & Goldman 1909

Synonyms
- Sorex californicus juncensis Nelson & Goldman 1909; Sorex juncensis HHT Jackson 1928

Subspecies of mammal

The tule shrew (Sorex ornatus juncensis) is a possibly extinct subspecies of the ornate shrew (Sorex ornatus). It was confined to the Baja California peninsula in Mexico.

== Description ==
The holotype, a young adult female, has a total length of 101 mm, a tail length of 41 mm and a hindfoot length of 12.5 mm. The condylobasal length of the skull is 16.2 mm, the basal length is 13.9 mm, the breadth of the braincase is 7.5 mm, the palatal length is 7.2 mm, and the interorbital breadth is 3.5 mm. In comparism to the ornate shrew the braincase is higher, narrower and less flattened. The tail is slightly longer and the feet are more dusky. The upperparts and sides are grey or slightly darker. The upperparts are smokey grey with a mixed hazel and vinaceous-buff wash. The tail is indistinct bicolored, with mixed grey and wood-brown upperparts and pale ochre-buff underparts.

== Distribution ==
The tule shrew was endemic to the El Socorro salt marsh area around 24.1 km (15.0 mi) south of San Quintin at the west coast of Baja California.

== Status ==
The tule shrew is only known by four specimens collected by Edward William Nelson and Edward Alphonso Goldman in September 1905. Attempts by Laurence Markham Huey in the 1940s and by Jesús E. Maldonado in 1991 to rediscover this shrew failed. Maldonado further noted that the El Socorro salt marsh area is essentially dry due to housing construction and that the tule shrew is likely extinct.
