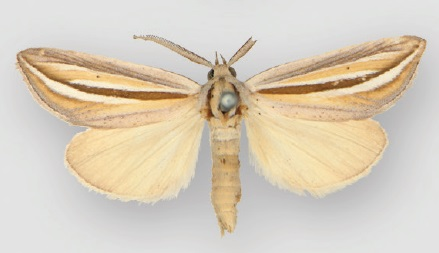

Scientific classification
- Kingdom: Animalia
- Phylum: Arthropoda
- Class: Insecta
- Order: Lepidoptera
- Superfamily: Noctuoidea
- Family: Erebidae
- Genus: Doryodes
- Species: D. insularia

Binomial name
- Doryodes insularia Hampson, 1904

= Doryodes insularia =

Species of moth

Doryodes insularia is a moth of the family Erebidae first described by George Hampson in 1904. It is found on the Bahamas.

The length of the forewings is 12.5 mm. The white lines bordering the longitudinal dark stripe on the forewing are thicker than those of any other species. There is a contrasting orange-brown band below the forewing costa and another one below the white line bordering the lower margin of the black stripe. Adults are on wing in January, February and July.
