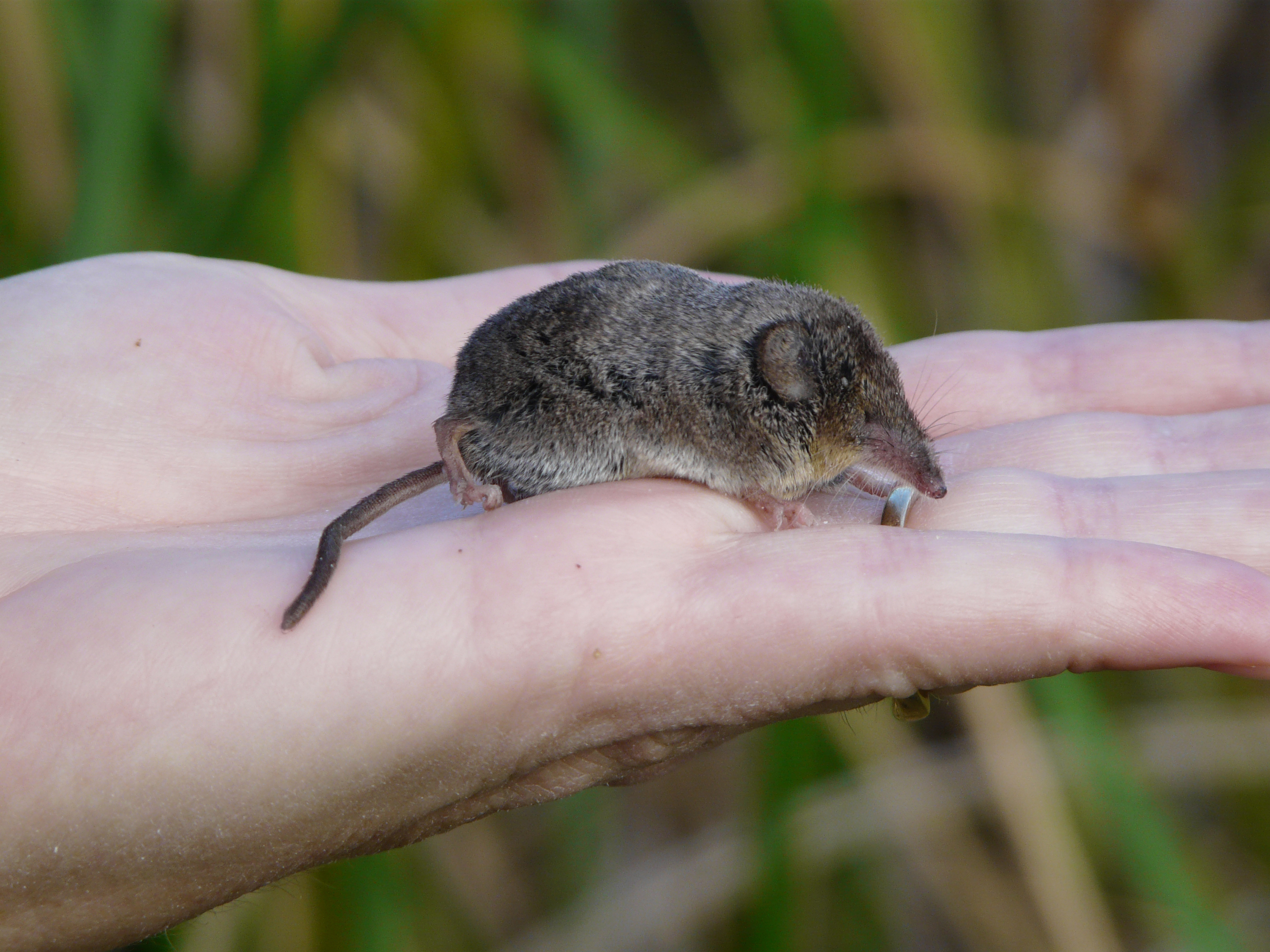
- Sorex ornatus relictus

Conservation status
- Least Concern (IUCN 3.1)

Scientific classification
- Kingdom: Animalia
- Phylum: Chordata
- Class: Mammalia
- Order: Eulipotyphla
- Family: Soricidae
- Genus: Sorex
- Species: S. ornatus

Binomial name
- Sorex ornatus Merriam, 1895
- Ornate shrew range

= Ornate shrew =

Species of mammal

The ornate shrew (Sorex ornatus) is a species of mammal in the family Soricidae (shrews). It is endemic to western North America, ranging from Northern California in the United States to the Baja California peninsula in Mexico. Eight subspecies are known, including the extinct tule shrew (S. o. juncensis), known only from four specimens collected in 1905, and the Suisun ornate shrew (S. o. sinuosus), a species of conservation concern in California. Through skull morphology research and genetic testing on Ornate shrew populations, it has been shown that there are three main genetic subdivisions: The Southern, Central and Northern. These three genetic subdivisions of Ornate shrew arose from populations of Ornate shrews getting geographically isolated from other populations.

== Description ==
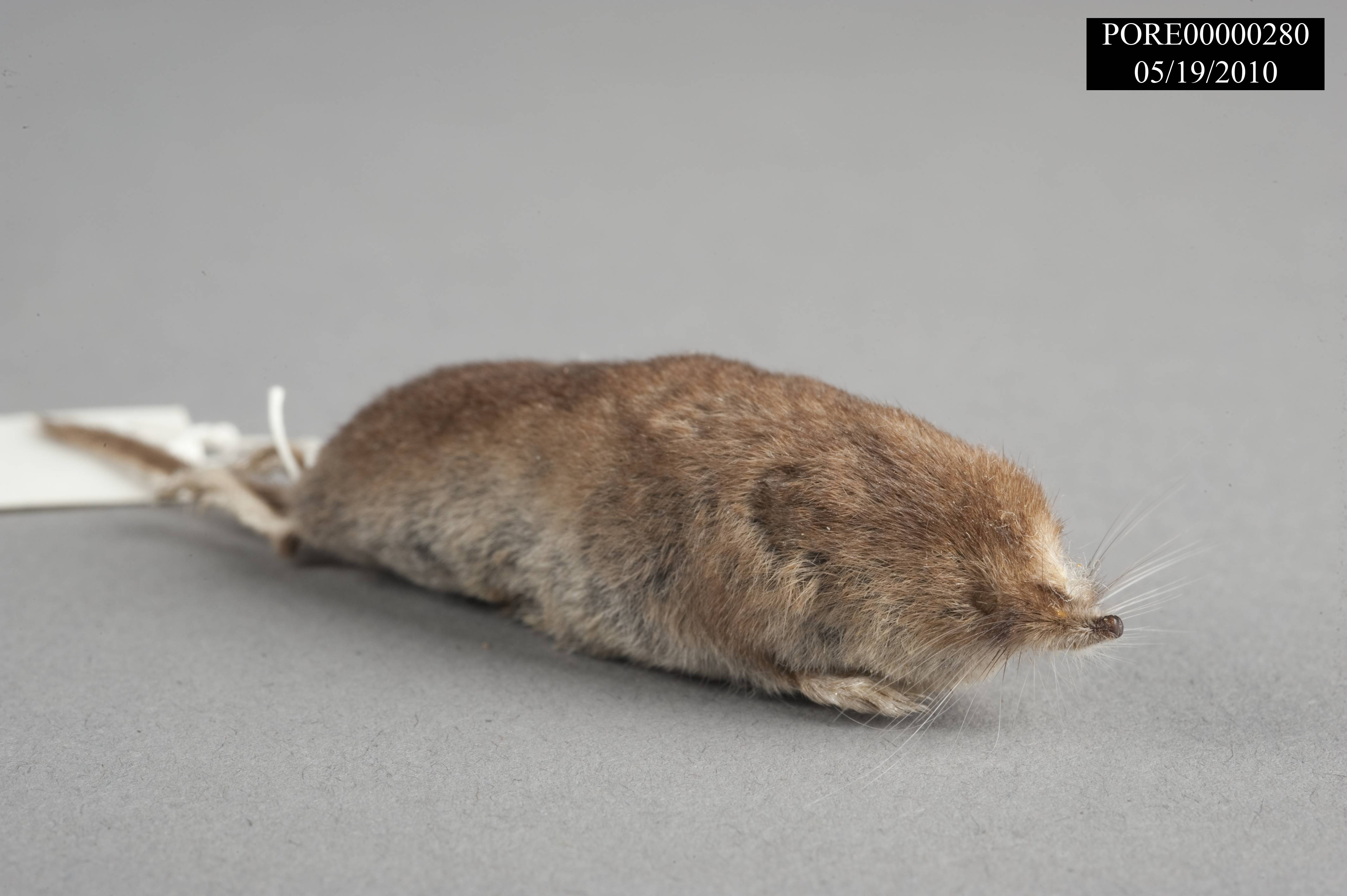
Museum specimen

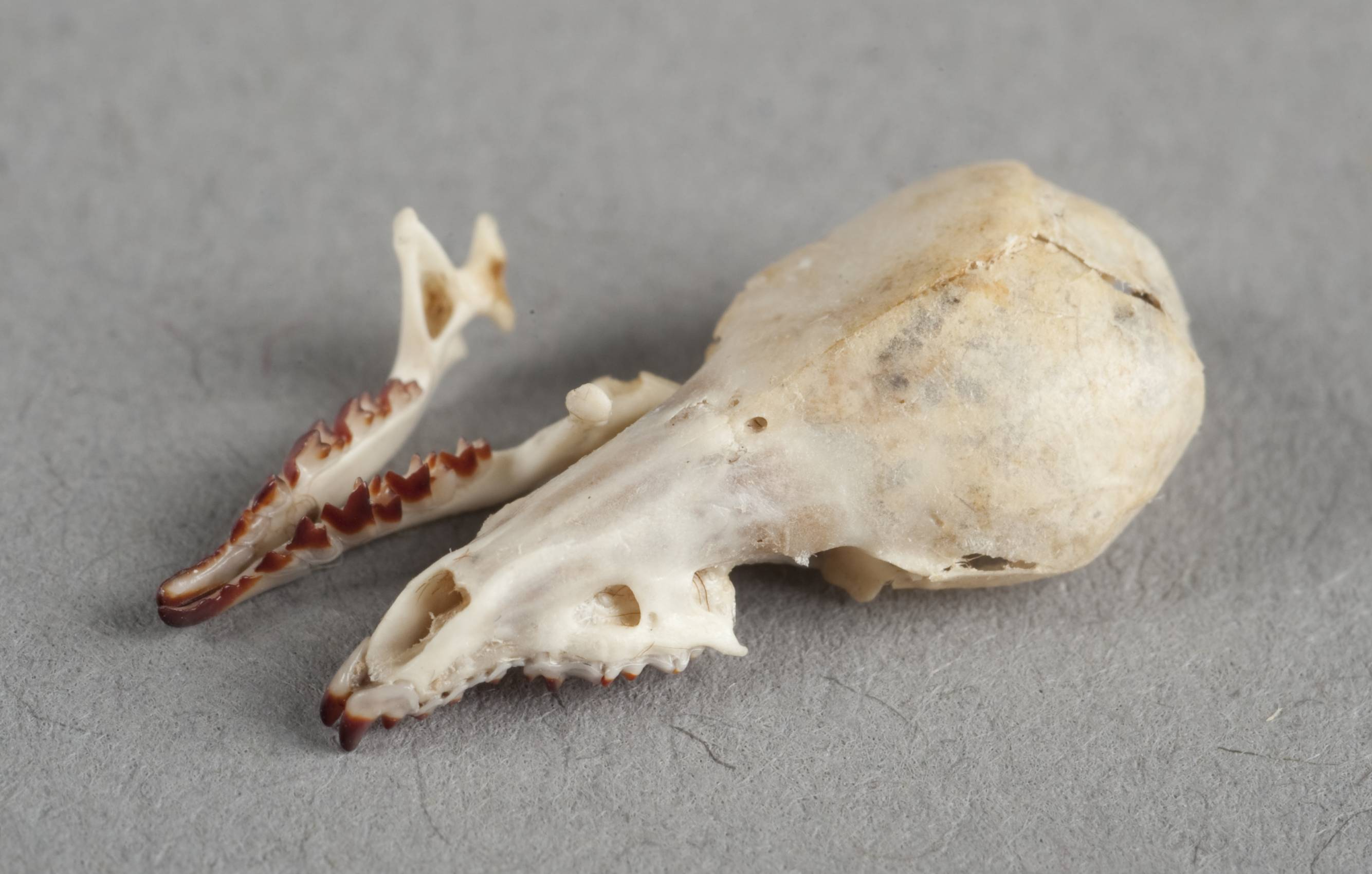
Skull

Ornate shrews are small; they weigh on average 5.12 g (0.181 oz). The total length of the animal averages 99.4 mm (3.91 in) with a hind foot measuring 12.1 mm (0.48 in). The tail is relatively short, measuring 37.5 mm (1.48 in). The shrew molts, with a change in fur coloring at different times of year. The coat is overall drab, brown on the back, trending towards a gray or buff on the underside. In winter, the backside coloring is darker brown, while the underside tends towards a grayish-white. Subspecies towards the south tend to be larger in size, and with darker markings, than those in the north.Due to the large variation in the coat of the shrew, it is not a reliable means of identifying the subspecies associated with the coat. Many scientists have turned to gene sequencing and tooth morphology to be more accurate.

The skull measures on average 16.3 mm (0.64 in) in length. The palate averages 6.82 mm (0.269 in) in length and the distance between the eye sockets averages 3.31 mm (0.130 in). The cranium is around 4.59 mm (0.181 in) long and 7.96 mm (0.313 in) wide. The overall shape of the skull is rather flat and broad, with a depression between the eye sockets.

Of all vertebrates, shrews have the most significant brain-to-body weight ratio.

The tail of the shrew is bicolored, gradually ranging from brown above to more gray underneath.

The dental formula for Sorex ornatus has been reported as {{{upper}}}{{{lower}}}3 1 3 31 1 1 3 × 2 = 32

Ornate shrew skull

== Taxonomy ==
=== Subspecies ===
ITIS lists the following subspecies:

- Sorex ornatus juncensis Nelson and Goldman, 1909
- Sorex ornatus lagunae Nelson and Goldman, 1909
- Sorex ornatus ornatus Merriam, 1895
- Sorex ornatus relictus Grinnell, 1932 – Buena Vista Lake ornate shrew, Buena Vista Lake shrew
- Appearance
  - The ornate shrew and its subspecies have a similar appearance to a mouse with a long snout, small bead eyes, concealed ears, and soft fur. The California-native Buena Vista Lake ornate shrew, specifically, has a primarily black coat with brown speckles and a gray undercoat.
- Threats
  - The Buena Vista Lake ornate shrew is classified as an endangered species. The biggest contribution to their decline has been habitat fragmentation and the loss of water supply. Main contributors to these factors include water diversion for agricultural use, pesticides, and drought. Human-made threats have largely affected the Buena Vista Lake shrew. The increase in concentration of selenium is considered a large threat to the Buena Vista Lake shrew. At locations where it has been captured, selenium concentrations in shrews have been 3 to 25 times higher than other mammals. The few populations of this shrew that are left are separated from each other so it is easier for natural causes to kill the species. Human intervention like removal of branches and drying out marshes have also threatened this species.
- Habitat

The Buena Vista Lake shrew previously could have been found at the Buena Vista Lake and the Tulare Basin in the swampy areas. Drying out of lakes and nearby water has restricted the range of the shrew.

There are four regions where the Buena Vista Lake shrew are found: the Kern Preserve, on the old Kern Lake bed, the Kern Fan recharge area, the Cole Levee Ecological Preserve, and the Kern National Wildlife Refuge.

The Buena Vista Lake shrews are more commonly found in moist habitats that have large and dense overstories for cover. They do not migrate. They also prefer habitats that have a variety of insects, both marine and terrestrial, as a food source.

- Sorex ornatus salarius von Bloeker, 1939 – Monterey ornate shrew
- Sorex ornatus salicornicus von Bloeker, 1932 – salt marsh ornate shrew
- Sorex ornatus sinuosus Grinnell, 1913 – Suisun ornate shrew
- Sorex ornatus willetti von Bloeker, 1942 – Santa Catalina ornate shrew

== Distribution and habitat ==
The ornate shrew is found along portions of the west coast of North America and a few near shore islands. The northern extent is around 39 degrees latitude in California. The range extends south into the Baja California peninsula. There is a stretch of territory through Baja where the shrew is not found, then it is found again near the southern tip. Santa Catalina Island hosts a population of a subspecies of ornate shrew (S. o. willetti). There are reports of ornate shrews on the islands of Santa Cruz and Santa Rosa as well.

Ornate shrews reside among coastal marshes and palustrine environments. Shrews like dense vegetation close to a water source. At places where shrews have been captured, the environment has been more moist than dry so removing wetland habitats reduces the land for shrews. Certain subspecies may be found only within specific habitats. The shrews have been found at altitudes as high as 2,400 metres (7,900 ft) in the San Jacinto Mountains. Ornate shrews were once common and widespread throughout their geographic range. However, populations in sensitive ecological regions have dwindled sharply. These areas include coastal wetlands, salt marshes, and freshwater swamps. Ornate shrews are also less common or have been eliminated from areas of intensive agriculture in central California.

== Feeding ==
The shrew needs to eat throughout the day because of their fast metabolism and small size. They can eat more than their weight and mostly consume water and land insects. This could be beneficial because many of the insects that they consume negatively affect crops. Depending on the time of year, shrews will eat spiders, worms, snails, and slugs.

== Behavior and ecology ==
The breeding period of the ornate shrew starts in late February and ends in late September or October. Shrews of similar size have a gestation period around 21 days, but no definitive information on the ornate shrew is available.

A litter can consist of 4 to 6 baby shrews which are expected to live for about 12 months. They do not hibernate however some species can enter a state of inactivity in harsh situations such as extreme cold. Their small size means they have a quick metabolism and lose heat quickly. This is why they often have problems maintaining their body temperature, especially in colder environments. Their short life expectancy leads to a high annual turnover rate. Shrews need to eat at least 24 insects per day especially during colder seasons when a large portion of their energy goes towards staying warm.

The ornate shrew primarily occupies areas of dense vegetation, which it needs for shelter from predators and places for nesting. Habitat destruction is the biggest threat to the ornate shew population, as much of their wetland terrain has been impacted by invasive plants and repurposing from humans for agriculture.

Ornate shrews are active at both night and day but are mostly nocturnal during breeding season during spring to late summer. Typically, ornate shrews are not aggressive towards each other unless under stressful circumstances. In studies, mature shrews have been shown to become antagonistic when food and water supplies are low. Observations of interactions between male and female ornate shrews' behavioral structure is female dominant.

== Human interactions ==
=== Conservation status ===
The International Union for Conservation of Nature and Natural Resources (IUCN) lists the conservation status of the ornate shrew as "Least Concern". The rationale cited is the broad geographic range of distribution and a population stable enough that listing the animal as threatened would not be appropriate. However, they note that geographically restricted groups on the Baja California Peninsula may be vulnerable due to habitat loss from human activity and other environmental stresses.

There was a small effort to save the shrew in 1988, but the U.S. Fish and Wildlife Service did not take action as the habitats for shrews were destroyed. It took until 2002 for the shrew to be recognized as endangered by the aforementioned federal agency.

The tule shrew, a subspecies of the ornate shrew, is recently extinct. The Government of Mexico has enacted special legal protections for ornate shrews. There are protected areas in both Mexico and the United States where ornate shrews are found. After efforts beginning in 2016 with 200,000 photos taken and up to 1,500 camera traps, another subspecies, the Catalina shrew (S. ornatus willetti) was photographed in 2020 after not being seen for 15 years.
