= Mammal Research Institute of the Polish Academy of Sciences =

Polish research institute

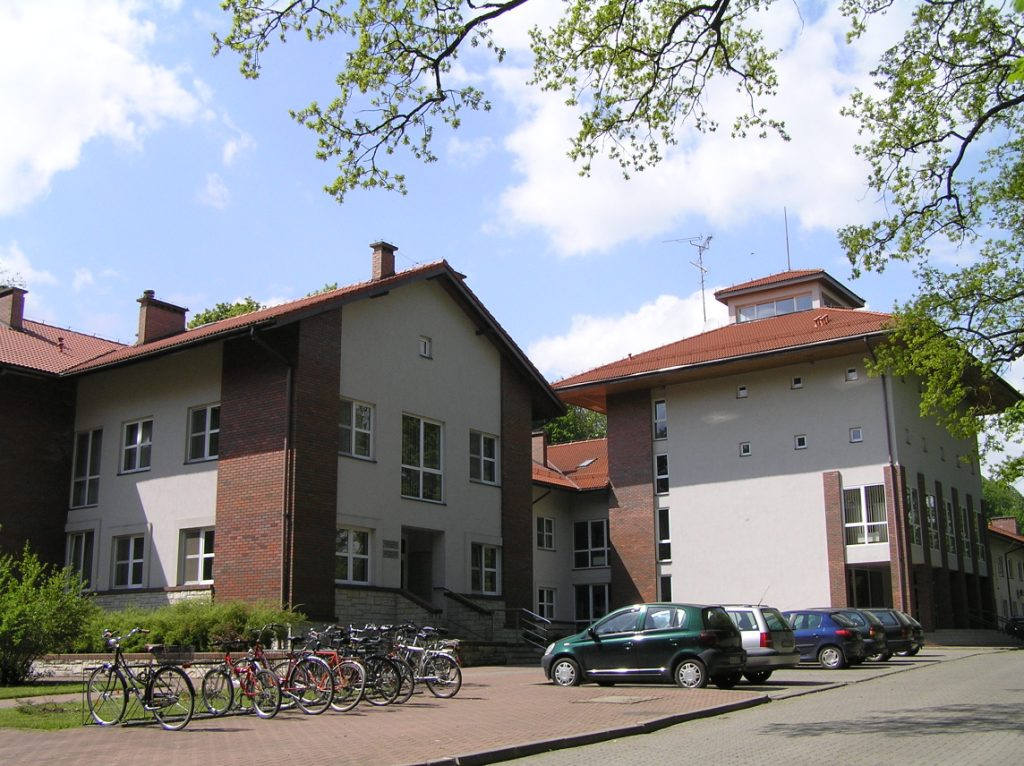
The MRI building in Białowieża

The Mammal Research Institute of the Polish Academy of Sciences (MRI PAS) (Polish: Instytut Biologii Ssaków Polskiej Akademii Nauk) is a research institution located in the Białowieża Primeval Forest in Poland. The Institute conducts research on all aspects of mammalian biology, publishes scientific journals, develops international scientific co-operation, and provides academic training.

The Mammal Research Institute was founded in 1952 and is an independent research institution of the Biology Department of the Polish Academy of Sciences. The Institute conducts research in morphology, taxonomy, systematics, evolution, population ecology, genetics, physiology, ethology, and ecology of mammals. In 1952–2023, the staff of the institute has published over 3100 works, including 410 books and chapters, over 1400 scientific articles and 800 popular science papers. Since 2003 the Institute has attained the status of a European Union Centre of Excellence and in 2006 was assessed as one of the Poland’s 5 best scientific institutions in the field of biology.

There are four research units within MRI PAS: Genetics and Evolution Research Unit, Biogeography Research Unit, Ecophysiology and Behavioral Ecology Research Unit and Population Ecology Research Unit.

In collaboration with the Springer Verlag GmbH, MRI PAS publishes the peer-reviewed international journal Mammal Research, an English-language journal on all aspects of mammalian biology. The impact factor of Mammal Research in 2022 was 1.8.
