= Prokelisia crocea =

Scientific classification
- Domain: Eukaryota
- Kingdom: Animalia
- Phylum: Arthropoda
- Class: Insecta
- Order: Hemiptera
- Suborder: Auchenorrhyncha
- Infraorder: Fulgoromorpha
- Family: Delphacidae
- Genus: Prokelisia
- Species: P. crocea

Binomial name
- Prokelisia crocea (Van Duzee, 1897)

Species of true bug

Prokelisia crocea is a species of delphacid planthopper in the family Delphacidae. It is found in North America.
