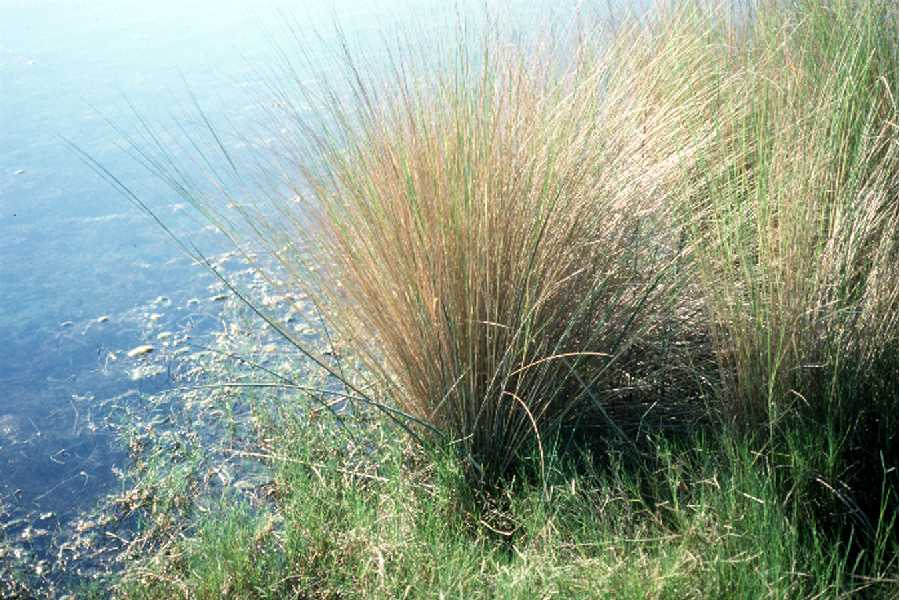

Conservation status
- Apparently Secure (NatureServe)

Scientific classification
- Kingdom: Plantae
- Clade: Tracheophytes
- Clade: Angiosperms
- Clade: Monocots
- Clade: Commelinids
- Order: Poales
- Family: Poaceae
- Subfamily: Chloridoideae
- Genus: Sporobolus
- Section: S. sect. Spartina
- Species: S. bakeri

Binomial name
- Sporobolus bakeri (Merr.) P.M.Peterson & Saarela

Synonyms
- Spartina bakeri Merr.; Spartina juncea var. bakeri (Merr.) St.-Yves

= Sporobolus bakeri =

Species of grass

Sporobolus bakeri is a species of grass commonly known as sand cordgrass or bunch cordgrass. It is native to the southeastern United States, where it grows along coastal areas and in inland freshwater habitats in Florida.

The species grows in dense clumps up to 20 feet wide with stems up to 4 feet tall. Its wiry leaves are light green on the undersides and darker on top. During winter, the plant is more brown, while in summer, it is brownish green.

This grass grows in aquatic and semiaquatic habitats, including beaches, ponds, and more upland sites. It may be used to control erosion and can tolerate flooding. It can be grown as an ornamental.
