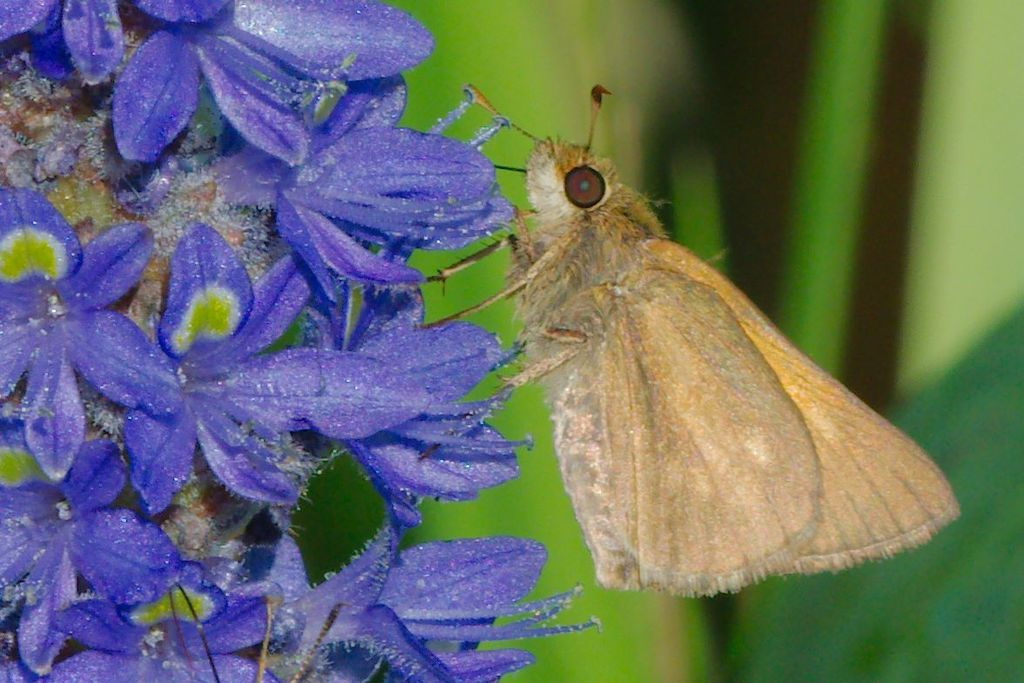

Conservation status
- Apparently Secure (NatureServe)

Scientific classification
- Kingdom: Animalia
- Phylum: Arthropoda
- Class: Insecta
- Order: Lepidoptera
- Family: Hesperiidae
- Genus: Poanes
- Species: P. aaroni

Binomial name
- Poanes aaroni (Skinner, 1890)

= Poanes aaroni =

Saffron skipper

Species of butterfly

Poanes aaroni, the saffron skipper, is a North American butterfly from the skipper family (Hesperiidae) which occurs in salt marshes along the Atlantic coast.

The upperside of the wings are vivid orange, with broad black borders. The underside of the hindwing is a paler orange with a pallid stripe in the center.

The larva feeds exclusively on smooth cordgrass (Spartina alterniflora).

Four subspecies are recognized:

- P. a. aaroni Skinner, 1890 – Aaron's skipper
- P. a. bordeloni – Bordelon's skipper
- P. a. howardi – Howard's skipper
- P. a. minimus – swamp skipper
