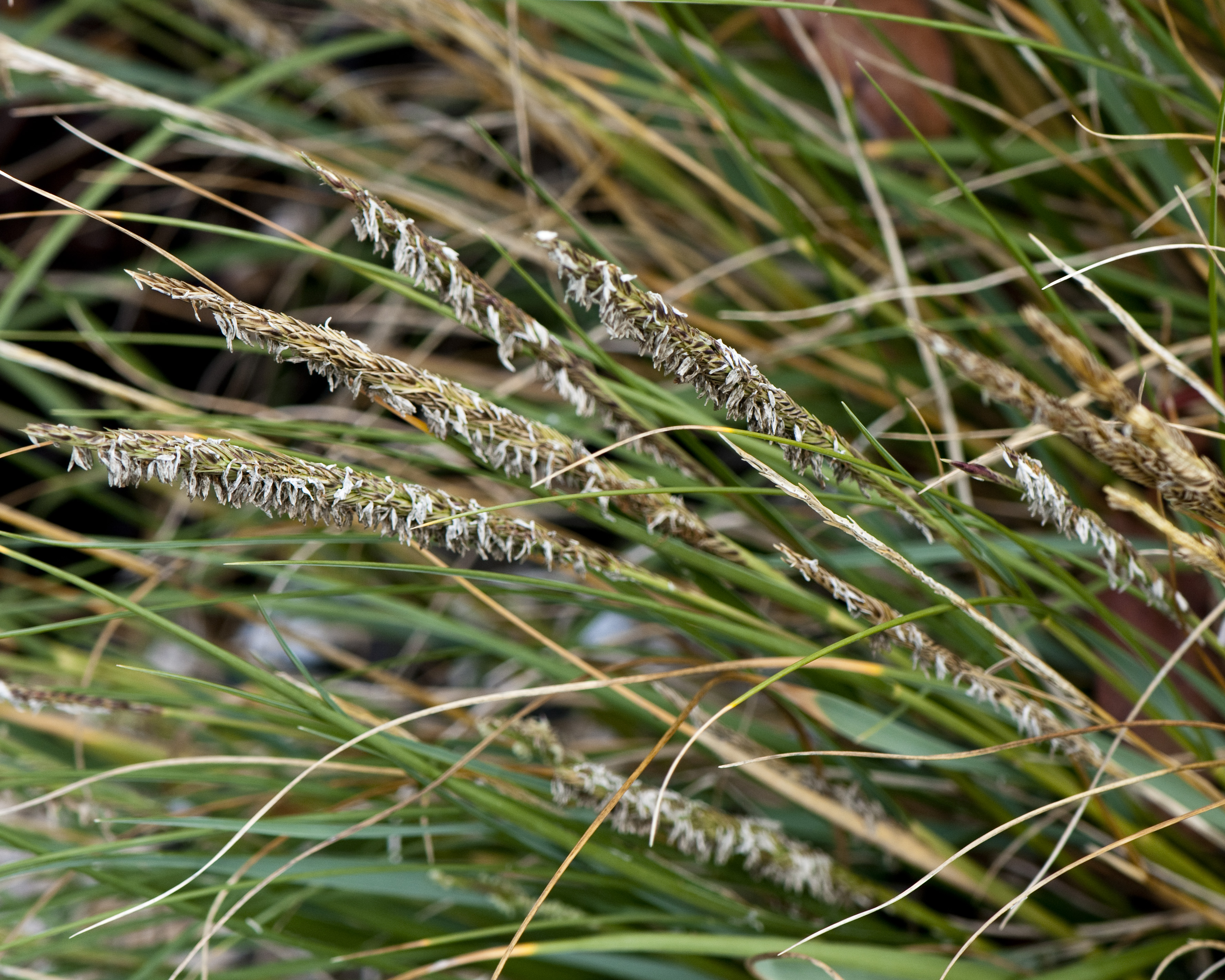

Scientific classification
- Kingdom: Plantae
- Clade: Tracheophytes
- Clade: Angiosperms
- Clade: Monocots
- Clade: Commelinids
- Order: Poales
- Family: Poaceae
- Subfamily: Chloridoideae
- Genus: Sporobolus
- Section: Spartina
- Species: S. montevidensis

Binomial name
- Sporobolus montevidensis (Arechav.) P.M.Peterson & Saarela

Synonyms
- List: Spartina juncea var. montevidensis (Arechav.) St.-Yves; Spartina montevidensis Arechav.; Chauvinia chilensis Steud.; Spartina densiflora Brogn.; Spartina densiflora subvar. pauper St.-Yves; Spartina juncea var. laxiflora St.-Yves; Spartina patagonica Speg.; Sporobolus densiflorus (Brongn.) P.M.Peterson & Saarela

= Sporobolus montevidensis =

Species of grass

Sporobolus montevidensis is a species of grass known by the common name denseflower cordgrass. Although reclassified after a taxonomic revision in 2014, it may still be referred to as Spartina densiflora by some users. It is native to the coastline of southern South America, where it is a resident of salt marshes. It is also known on the west coast of the North America and parts of the Mediterranean coast as an introduced species and in some areas a noxious weed. In California it is a troublesome invasive species of marshes in San Francisco Bay and in Humboldt Bay, where it was introduced during the 19th century from Chile in ballast.

== Description ==
This perennial grass generally lacks rhizomes. It grows in erect clumps of slender stems that can reach 1.5 meters tall. The long, narrow, gray-green leaves are rolled inward, especially when new. The inflorescence is a narrow, dense, spike-like stick of branches appressed together, the unit reaching up to 30 centimetres long. The flowers are colorless and the spikelets are tipped with bristles.

== Invasive species ==
This species has negative impacts on the salt marsh habitat of the California coast. It forms tight clumps of herbage that raise the elevation of the plants in the marsh, keeping the water from flowing in as far as it naturally would, and increasing sediment accumulation. It competes with its native relative, California cordgrass (Sporobolus foliosus), and other marsh plants such as pickleweed (Salicornia pacifica). Efforts to eradicate Sporobolus montevidensis and related hybrids in the San Francisco Bay area reduced the coverage to approximately 41 square meters in 2014, down from about 1.7 hectares (4.2 acres) in 2005. However, it continues to expand in the Humboldt Bay region.
