= Wolfgang Dehnel =

German politician

Member of the Bundestag
- In office 3 October 1990 – 17 October 2002

Personal details
- Born: 11 February 1945 (age 81) Schwarzenberg, Gau Saxony, Nazi Germany
- Party: CDU
- Other political affiliations: CDU (DDR)
- Children: 2

Wolfgang Dehnel is a German politician of the Christian Democratic Union (CDU). He was a member of the Volkskammer and of the Bundestag.

== Life ==
Dehnel joined the CDU in 1976 and was a city councillor in Schwarzenberg from 1980 to 1990. From 1990 to 1997 he was chairman of the Schwarzenberg CDU district association. He was elected to the Volkskammer in 1990 for constituency 08 (Karl-Marx-Stadt), of which he was a member from 18 March to 2 October 1990. After reunification, he became a member of the Bundestag, to which he belonged until 2002 as a directly elected member of parliament for constituency 326 (Aue-Schwarzenberg-Klingenthal). From 2005 to 2015 Dehnel was chairman of the Schwarzenberg Ore Mountain Club.
