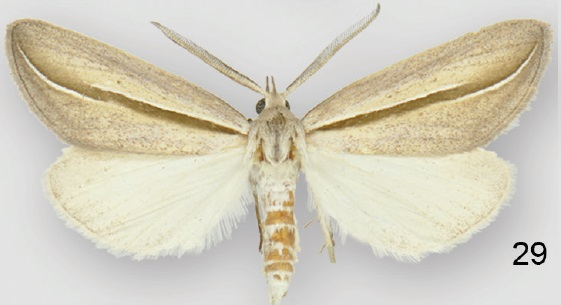
- Male
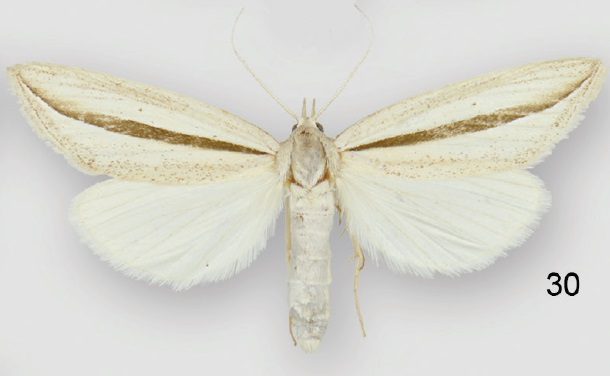
- Female

Scientific classification
- Kingdom: Animalia
- Phylum: Arthropoda
- Class: Insecta
- Order: Lepidoptera
- Superfamily: Noctuoidea
- Family: Erebidae
- Genus: Doryodes
- Species: D. tenuistriga

Binomial name
- Doryodes tenuistriga Barnes & McDunnough, 1918

= Doryodes tenuistriga =

Species of moth

Doryodes tenuistriga is a moth of the family Erebidae first described by William Barnes and James Halliday McDunnough in 1918. It is found in North America, where it has been recorded from costal Texas and Louisiana.

The wingspan is about 33 mm for males and 41 mm for females. The forewings are pale olive ocherous, broadly shaded with pale purplish along the costa and inner and outer margins. The hindwings are whitish. Adults have been recorded on wing in October and November.
