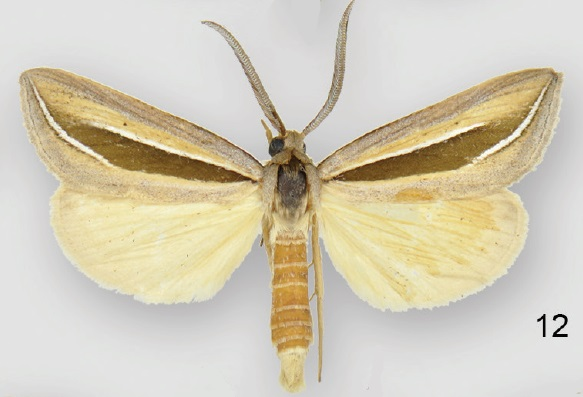
- Male
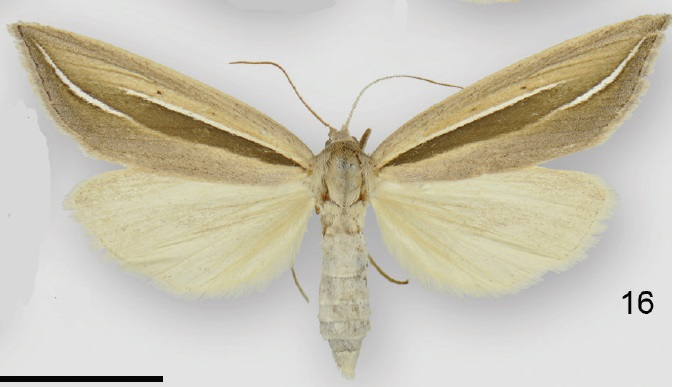
- Female

Scientific classification
- Domain: Eukaryota
- Kingdom: Animalia
- Phylum: Arthropoda
- Class: Insecta
- Order: Lepidoptera
- Superfamily: Noctuoidea
- Family: Erebidae
- Genus: Doryodes
- Species: D. latistriga

Binomial name
- Doryodes latistriga Sullivan & Lafontaine, 2015

= Doryodes latistriga =

Species of moth

Doryodes latistriga is a moth of the family Erebidae first described by J. Donald Lafontaine and James Bolling Sullivan in 2015. It is found in the United States in tidal creeks and salt marshes from Alabama to Louisiana.

The length of the forewings is 14.5–18 mm for males and 17.5–20 mm for females. The forewing ground color in spring and summer specimens is yellowish white to buff with gray streaking, the hindwing is white to whitish buff. The forewing in fall and winter specimens is darker with more brown shading, the hindwing variably suffused with brown, especially along the wing margin. The longitudinal stripe is broader than in any other species in genus. Adults are on wing throughout the year.

== Etymology ==
The species name refers to the width of the longitudinal dark stripe on the forewing in both sexes.
