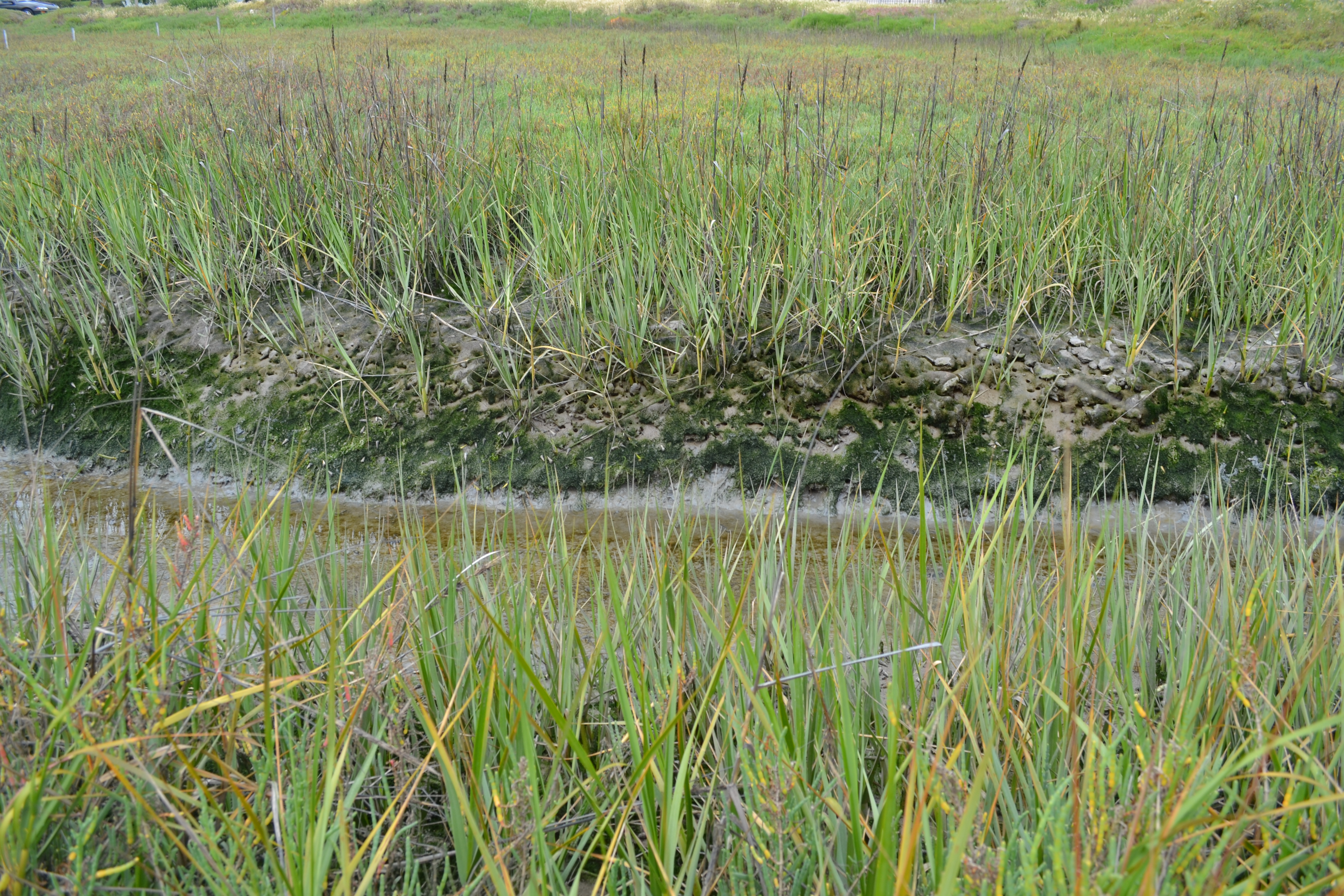

Conservation status
- Vulnerable (NatureServe)

Scientific classification
- Kingdom: Plantae
- Clade: Tracheophytes
- Clade: Angiosperms
- Clade: Monocots
- Clade: Commelinids
- Order: Poales
- Family: Poaceae
- Subfamily: Chloridoideae
- Genus: Sporobolus
- Section: Spartina
- Species: S. foliosus

Binomial name
- Sporobolus foliosus (Trin.)

Synonyms
- List: Spartina densiflora f. acuta St.-Yves; Spartina foliosa Trin.; Spartina leiantha Benth.; Spartina stricta var. foliosa (Trin.) Thurb.

= Sporobolus foliosus =

Species of grass

Sporobolus foliosus is a species of grass known by the common name California cordgrass. It was reclassified from Spartina foliosa after a taxonomic revision in 2014. It is native to the salt marshes and mudflats of coastal California and Baja California, especially San Francisco Bay. It is a perennial grass growing from short rhizomes. It produces single stems or clumps of thick, fleshy stems that grow up to 1.5 meters tall. They are green or purple-tinged. The long, narrow leaves are flat or rolled inward. The inflorescence is a narrow, dense, spike-like stick of branches appressed together, the unit reaching up to 25 centimeters long. The lower spikelets are sometimes enclosed in the basal sheaths of upper leaves.

This native plant is seriously threatened by the invasion of its North American Atlantic coast relative smooth cordgrass (Sporobolus alterniflorus), which is not native to the Pacific coast. S. alterniflorus was introduced to San Francisco Bay in the 1970s and it quickly began to hybridize with S. foliosus. Hybrids generally outcompete the native plant and spread rapidly, threatening S. foliosus with localized extirpation. The two species reproduce at the same time of year, and the invader sheds large amounts of pollen that fertilize the flowers of the native, so that the majority of an affected native plant's offspring are hybrids. This is an example of genetic pollution. S. alterniflorus × foliosus hybrids have spread rapidly because they are much more genetically fit than either parental species, an example of hybrid vigor. However, S. foliosus is still the dominant plant at lower tidal elevations in most salt marshes around San Francisco Bay, and numerous locations within the Bay have remained uninfested during ongoing efforts to eradicate S. alterniflorus and hybrids. Restoration of tidal marsh habitat is in progress at multiple sites, including the planting of cultivated S. foliosus harvested from uninfested locations and propagated in a nursery.
