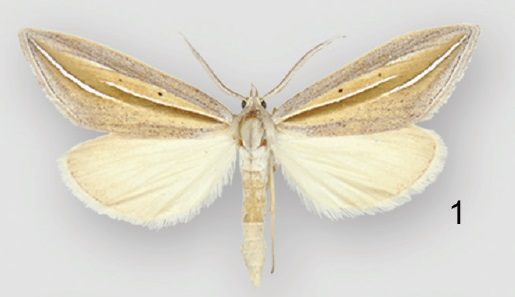
- Male
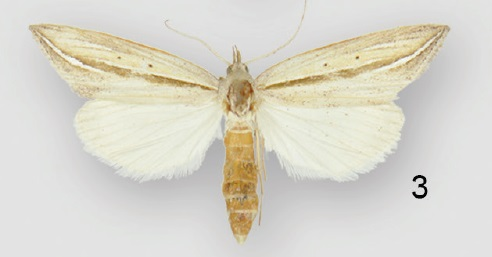
- Female

Scientific classification
- Domain: Eukaryota
- Kingdom: Animalia
- Phylum: Arthropoda
- Class: Insecta
- Order: Lepidoptera
- Superfamily: Noctuoidea
- Family: Erebidae
- Genus: Doryodes
- Species: D. bistrialis

Binomial name
- Doryodes bistrialis (Geyer, 1832)

Synonyms
- Agriphila bistrialis Geyer 1832; Doryodes acutaria Herrich-Schäffer, 1832; Ligia acutarius Herrich-Schäffer, 1852

= Doryodes bistrialis =

Species of moth

Doryodes bistrialis, the double-lined doryodes moth, is a moth of the family Erebidae. The species was first described by Carl Geyer in 1832. It is found in the eastern United States, including Delaware, Virginia, Mississippi and Florida. Its habitat consists of wet pine flatwoods and pine savannas.

The length of the forewings is 13–15.5 mm for males and 14.5–16 mm for females. Adults can usually be identified by the narrower dark stripe on the forewing and their relatively small size. Compared to Doryodes spadaria the medial longitudinal stripe on the forewing is much narrower and the hindwings are whitish not buff through June emergences. Adults are on wing from April to October in North Carolina, and throughout the year in Florida.

The larvae feed on Aristida stricta.

== Taxonomy ==
It was considered a synonym of Doryodes grandipennis for some time.
