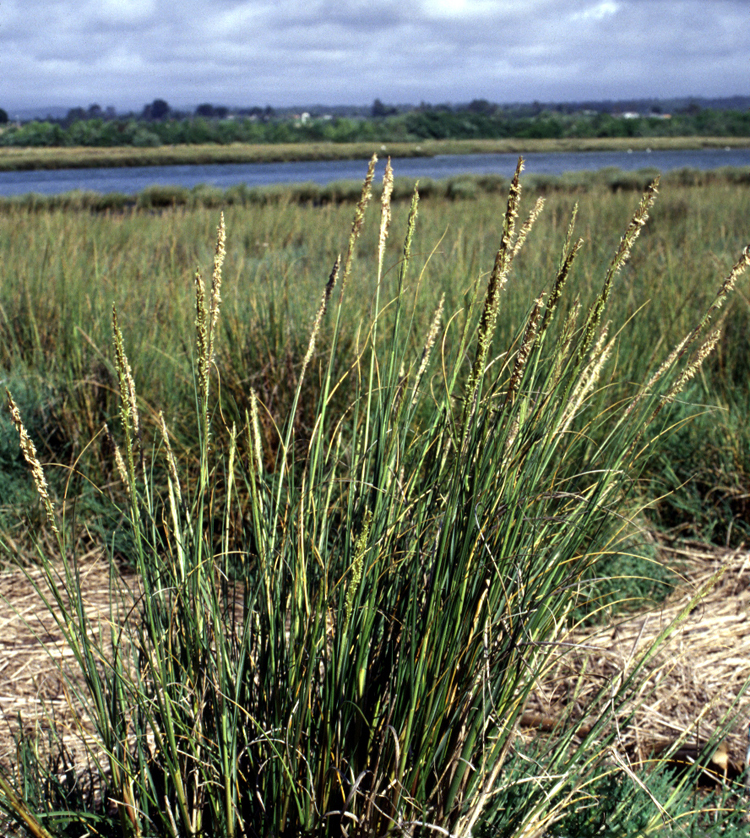
- Sporobolus montevidensis

Scientific classification
- Kingdom: Plantae
- Clade: Tracheophytes
- Clade: Angiosperms
- Clade: Monocots
- Clade: Commelinids
- Order: Poales
- Family: Poaceae
- Subfamily: Chloridoideae
- Genus: Sporobolus
- Section: S. sect. Spartina; Schreb.

Type species
- Sporobolus cynosuroides (L.) P.M.Peterson & Saarela

Synonyms
- List: Chauvinia Steud.; Limnetis Rich.; Ponceletia Thouars 1808 not R.Br. 1810; Psammophila Schult.; Solenachne Steud.; Trachynotia Michx.

= Spartina =

Genus of flowering plant in the grass family Poaceae

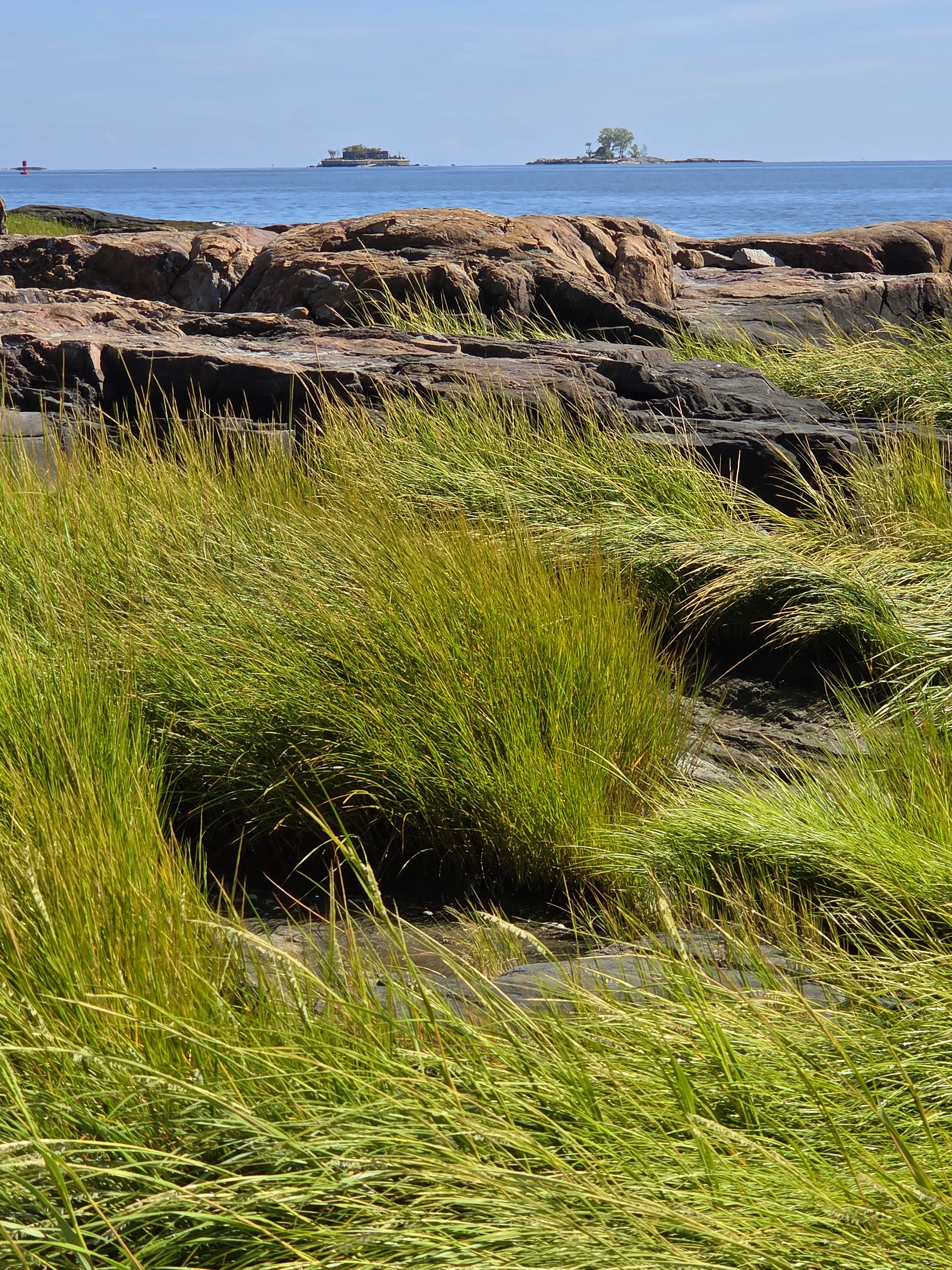
Cordgrass in Pelham Bay salt marsh (Pelham Bay Park, The Bronx, New York)

Spartina is a section of the genus Sporobolus, plants in the grass family, frequently found in coastal salt marshes. It was first established as a separate genus in 1789, and reduced to a section in 2014. Species are commonly known as cordgrass or cord-grass, and are native to the coasts of the Atlantic Ocean in western and southern Europe, north-western and southern Africa, the Americas and the islands of the southern Atlantic Ocean; one or two species also occur on the western coast of North America and in freshwater habitats inland in the Americas. The highest species diversity is on the east coasts of North and South America, particularly Florida. They form large, often dense colonies, particularly on coastal salt marshes, and grow quickly. The species vary in size from 0.3–2 m tall. Many of the species will produce hybrids if they come into contact.

== Taxonomy ==
In 2014, the taxon Spartina was subsumed into the genus Sporobolus and reassigned to the taxonomic status of section, but it may still be possible to see Spartina referred to as an accepted genus. In 2019, an interdisciplinary team of experts from all continents (except for Antarctica) coauthored a report published in the journal Ecology supporting Spartina as a genus.

The section name Spartina is derived from σπαρτίνη (spartínē), the Greek word for a cord made from Spanish broom (Spartium junceum).

=== Species ===
The following species are recognised in the section Spartina:

Subsection Alterniflori P.M.Peterson & Saarela

- Sporobolus alterniflorus (Loisel.) P.M.Peterson & Saarela – smooth cordgrass – Atlantic coasts of North and South America, West Indies
- Sporobolus anglicus (C.E.Hubb.) P.M.Peterson & Saarela - Great Britain, introduced to Europe, China, Australia, New Zealand, and North America
- Sporobolus foliosus (Trin.) P.M.Peterson & Saarela – California cordgrass – California, Baja California, Baja California Sur
- Sporobolus longispicus (Hauman & Parodi ex St.-Yves) P.M.Peterson & Saarela – Argentina, Uruguay
- Sporobolus maritimus (Curtis) P.M.Peterson & Saarela - Europe, Africa
- Sporobolus × townsendii (H.Groves & J.Groves) P.M.Peterson & Saarela (S. alterniflorus × S. maritimus) – Townsend's cordgrass – western Europe

Subsection Ponceletia (Thouars) P.M.Peterson & Saarela

- Sporobolus arundinacea (Thouars) Carmich – Tristan da Cunha, Amsterdam Island in Indian Ocean
- Sporobolus mobberleyanus P.M.Peterson & Saarela – Tristan da Cunha, Amsterdam Island in Indian Ocean
- Sporobolus spartinae (Trin.) P.M.Peterson & Saarela – Gulf cordgrass – Atlantic coast of North America from Florida to Argentina, incl the Caribbean and the Gulf of Mexico

Subsection Spartina (Schreb) P.M.Peterson & Saarela

- Sporobolus bakeri (Merr.) P.M.Peterson & Saarela – sand cordgrass – south-eastern US
- Sporobolus coarctatus (Trin.) P.M.Peterson & Saarela – Brazil, Argentina, Uruguay
- Sporobolus cynosuroides (L.) P.M.Peterson & Saarela – big cordgrass – eastern US (TX to MA); Bahamas
- Sporobolus × eatonianus P.M.Peterson & Saarela – eastern North America
- Sporobolus hookerianus P.M.Peterson & Saarela – alkali cordgrass – western Canada, western + central US, Chihuahua, Jalisco, Michoacán
- Sporobolus michauxianus (Hitchc.) P.M.Peterson & Saarela – prairie cordgrass – from Northwest Territories to Texas and Newfoundland
- Sporobolus montevidensis (Arechav.) P.M.Peterson & Saarela – denseflower cordgrass – Venezuela, Brazil, Argentina, Uruguay, Chile
- Sporobolus pumilus (Roth) P.M.Peterson & Saarela – saltmeadow cordgrass – east coast of North America from Labrador to Tamaulipas; West Indies
- Sporobolus versicolor (E.Fabre) P.M.Peterson & Saarela – Mediterranean, Azores

== Ecology ==
Species of the section Spartina are used as food plants by the larvae of some Lepidoptera species including the Aaron's skipper, which feeds exclusively on smooth cordgrass, and the engrailed moth.

Some species of the section Spartina are considered as ecosystem engineers that can strongly influence the physical and biological environment. This is particularly important in areas where invasive Spartina species significantly alter their new environment, with impacts to native plants and animals.

=== As an invasive species ===
Three of the species placed in Spartina have become invasive plants in some countries. In British Columbia, Sporobolus anglica, also known as English cordgrass, is an aggressive, aquatic alien that invades mud flats, salt marshes and beaches, out-competing native plants, spreading quickly over mud flats and leaving large Spartina meadows. It is also invasive in China and California.

Sporobolus montevidensis and Sporobolus pumilus have become invasive on the Iberian Peninsula and the west coast of the United States

Sporobolus alterniflorus and its hybrids with other Spartina species are invasive in numerous locations around the globe, including China, California, England, France, and Spain.

== Cultivation ==
Species of the section Spartina have been planted to reclaim estuarine areas for farming, to supply fodder for livestock, and to prevent erosion. Various members of the genus (especially Sporobolus alterniflorus and its derivatives, Sporobolus anglicus and Sporobolus × townsendii) have spread outside of their native boundaries and become invasive.

Big cordgrass (S. cynosuroides) is used in the construction of bull's eye targets for sports archery. A properly constructed target can stop an arrow safely without damage to the arrowhead as it lodges in the target.
