= August Dehnel =

Polish zoologist

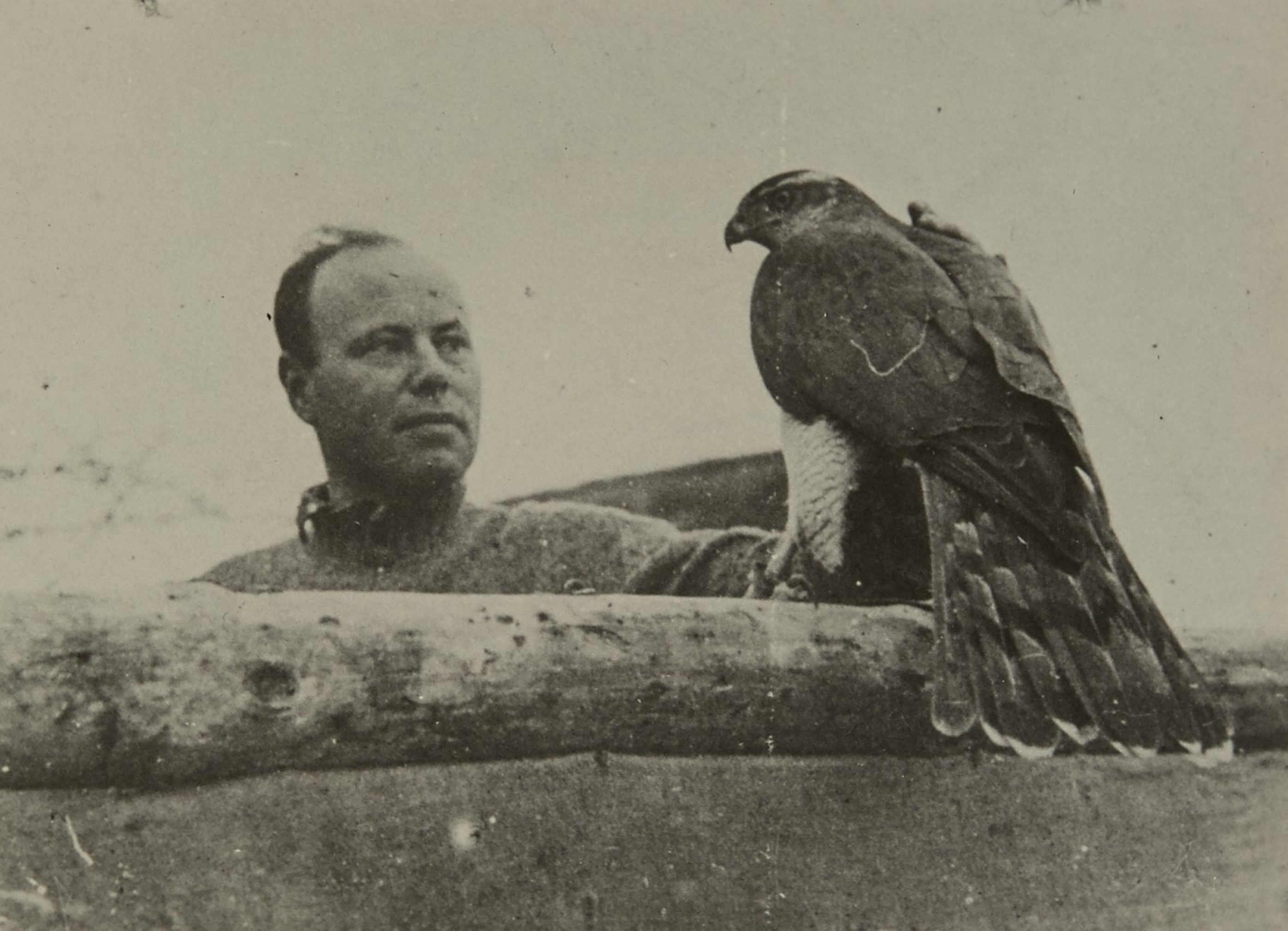
Dehnel with a falcon, c. 1930

August Gustaw Dehnel s. Michała (June 25, 1903, in Warsaw – November 22, 1962, in Warsaw) was a Polish zoologist, Ph.D. (1926), professor. Until 1949 he signed his popular science and embryology works with the name Gustaw Dehnel.

Dehnel was born in Warsaw, the son of Maria née Sliwicka and physician Michael Dehnel. After school he was conscripted and served in Upper Silesia for which he received a medal of valour. He became a student of Jan Korczak Tur in the Institute of Comparative Anatomy from 1922. He obtained his doctorate in 1926 and became a senior assistant. He took an interest in teratological monstrosities in Emys orbicularis and later studied avian embryology. Along with Tur, they examined experimental approaches to embryonic development in fowl eggs and discovered that growth and development was highly regulated.

In 1935 he left work at Warsaw University and began to study the mammal fauna of Poland at the State Zoological Museum. He also worked on the management of beaver habitats. During World War II he was conscripted and taken prisoner by the Germans. He gave biology lectures at the prisoner-of-war camp in Grosborn. He returned to the Museum in May 1946 and a year later joined the Maria Curie-Sklodowska University at Lublin as an assistant professor. It was here that he conducted studies on Sorex shrews and seasonal variations in the size of their braincase. He found that it shrinks significantly over the winter and expands again in the spring. This has come to be known as Dehnel's phenomenon. It affects not only the brain, but also other major organs such as the liver and kidneys. This factor explains why such small animals can survive harsh winters with associated reduction in food availability. The phenomenon may be responsible for the preservation of certain rare populations such as the Suisun Shrew. For this discovery, reported in his habilitation thesis (1949) at the University of Warsaw, he received the State Award.

Dehnel also took a special interest in falconry and was among the last falconers in Poland. He admired the writings of Anatole France and Mikhail Sholohov. He founded the journal Acta Theriologica in 1955, which is published today by Springer under the name Mammal Research.

== Books ==
- 1960: Maleńki ssak o dużej przyszłości (A tiny mammal with a big future) - on shrews
- 1949: Zamki na wodzie (Water castles) - on beavers
- 1947: Najpospolitsze gryzonie i ich zwalczanie (Common rodents and their control) (with E. Kaminski)
- 1939: O sztuce układania ptaków drapieżnych do łowów (On the art of training birds of prey for the hunt)

== Decorations ==
- 1920: Cross of Valour, for the participation in the Polish-Soviet War (1918-1920)
- 1950: State Award of the Polish People's Republic of III degree
- 1954: Knight's Cross of the Order of Polonia Restituta
- 1954: Golden Cross of Merit (Poland)
- 1954: Medal of the 10th Anniversary of People's Poland
