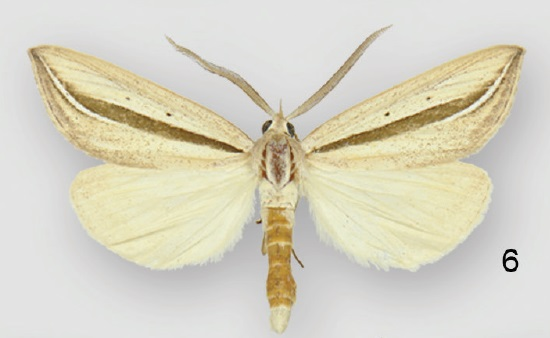
- Male
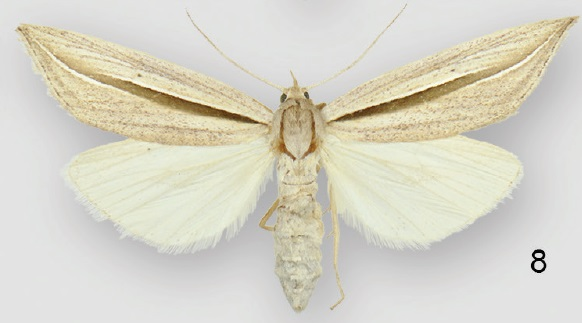
- Female

Scientific classification
- Kingdom: Animalia
- Phylum: Arthropoda
- Clade: Pancrustacea
- Class: Insecta
- Order: Lepidoptera
- Superfamily: Noctuoidea
- Family: Erebidae
- Genus: Doryodes
- Species: D. spadaria

Binomial name
- Doryodes spadaria Guenée, 1857

Synonyms
- Themma divisa Walker, 1863; Tunza promptella Walker, 1863; Doryodes spadaria race grandipennis Barnes & McDunnough, 1918

= Doryodes spadaria =

Species of moth

Doryodes spadaria, the dull doryodes moth, is a moth of the family Erebidae. The species was first described by Achille Guenée in 1857. It is found in North America, where it has been recorded from coastal Florida, Georgia, North Carolina, South Carolina and Texas. The habitat consists of salt marshes.

The wingspan is 28–32 mm. The forewing ground color in males varies from whitish buff to yellow buff with gray streaks. The longitudinal dark stripe is dark brown and conspicuously wider than in Doryodes bistrialis the ground color in females averages paler than that of males and the wings and dark longitudinal stripe are narrower. Adults are on wing year round.

The larvae feed on Spartina species.
