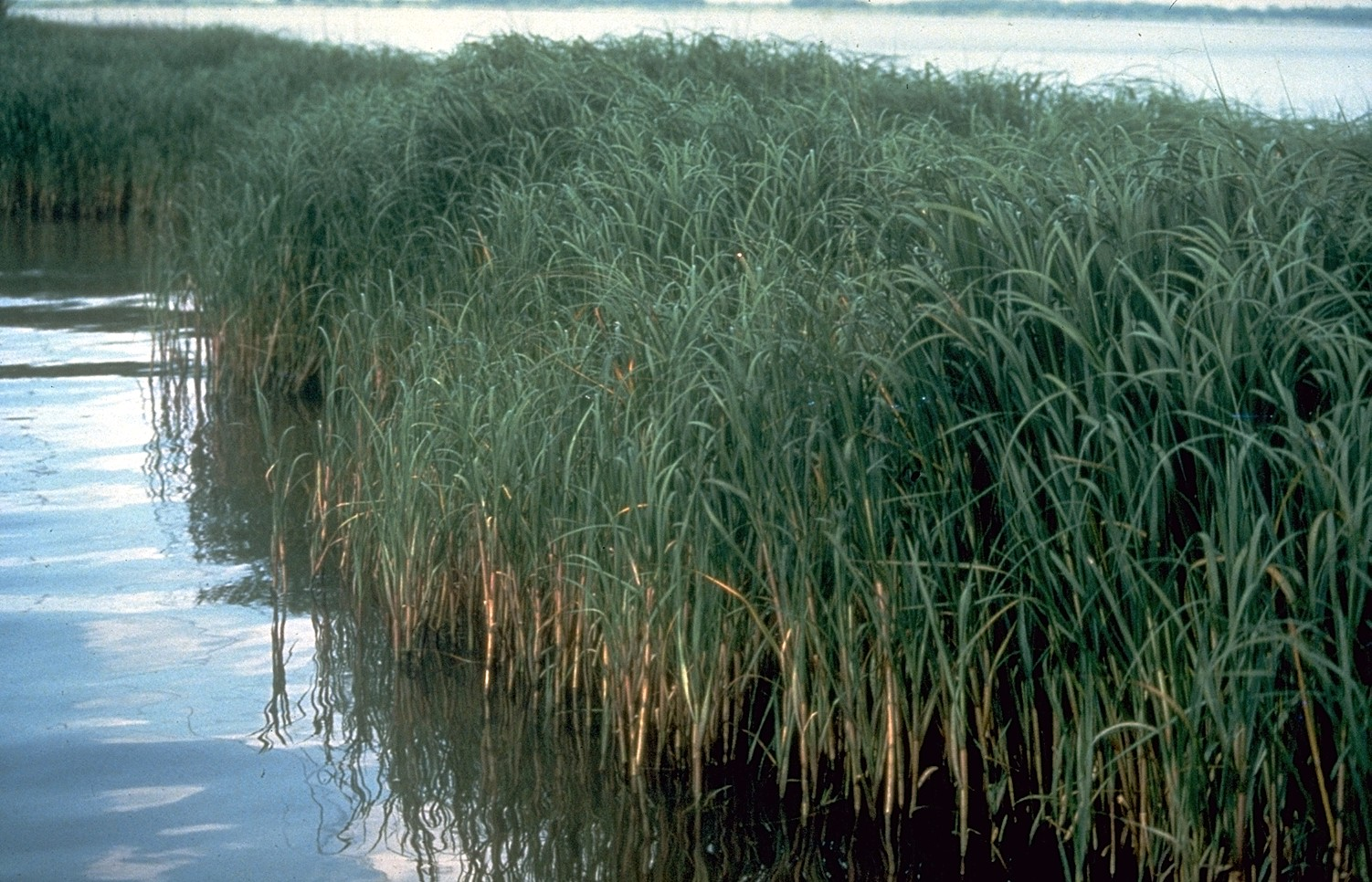

Scientific classification
- Kingdom: Plantae
- Clade: Embryophytes
- Clade: Tracheophytes
- Clade: Angiosperms
- Clade: Monocots
- Clade: Commelinids
- Order: Poales
- Family: Poaceae
- Subfamily: Chloridoideae
- Genus: Sporobolus
- Section: S. sect. Spartina
- Species: S. alterniflorus

Binomial name
- Sporobolus alterniflorus (Loisel.) P.M.Peterson & Saarela

Synonyms
- List: Dactylis fasciculata Lam.; Dactylis maritima Walter; Limnetis glabra (Muhl. ex Elliott) Nutt.; Rottboellia paniculata Salzm. ex Steud.; Spartina alterniflora Loisel.; Spartina alterniflora var. glabra (Muhl. ex Elliott) Fernald; Spartina alterniflora var. pilosa (Merr.) Fernald; Spartina bahiensis Steud.; Spartina brasiliensis Raddi; Spartina dissitiflora Steud.; Spartina fasciculata P.Beauv.; Spartina glabra var. alterniflora (Loisel.) Merr.; Spartina glabra var. pilosa Merr.; Spartina laevigata Bosc ex Link; Spartina maritima var. alterniflora (Loisel.) St.-Yves; Spartina maritima var. brasiliensis (Raddi) St.-Yves; Spartina maritima subvar. fallax St.-Yves; Spartina maritima var. glabra (Muhl. ex Elliott) St.-Yves; Spartina maritima subsp. glabra (Muhl. ex Elliott) St.-Yves; Spartina maritima subvar. pilosa (Merr.) St.-Yves; Spartina maritima subvar. radii St.-Yves; Spartina stricta var. alterniflora (Loisel.) A.Gray; Spartina stricta var. maritima Britton, Sterns & Poggenb.; Trachynotia alterniflora (Loisel.) DC.

= Sporobolus alterniflorus =

Species of aquatic plant

Sporobolus alterniflorus, or synonymously known as Spartina alterniflora, the smooth cordgrass, saltmarsh cordgrass, or salt-water cordgrass, is a perennial deciduous grass which is found in intertidal wetlands, especially estuarine salt marshes. It has been reclassified as Sporobolus alterniflorus after a taxonomic revision in 2014, but it is still common to see Spartina alterniflora and in 2019 an interdisciplinary team of experts coauthored a report published in the journal Ecology supporting Spartina as a genus. It grows 1–1.5 m (3–5 ft) tall and has smooth, hollow stems that bear leaves up to 20–60 cm (8–24 in) long and 1.5 cm (1/2 in) wide at their base, which are sharply tapered and bend down at their tips. Like its relative saltmeadow cordgrass S. patens, it produces flowers and seeds on only one side of the stalk. The flowers are a yellowish-green, turning brown by the winter. It has rhizomes, which, when broken off, can result in vegetative asexual growth. The rhizomes are an important food resource for snow geese. Sporobolus alterniflorus grows in low marsh (frequently inundated by the tide) as well as high marsh (less frequently inundated), but it is usually restricted to low marsh because it is outcompeted by salt meadow cordgrass in the high marsh. It grows in a wide range of salinities, from about 5 psu to marine (32 psu), and has been described as the "single most important marsh plant species in the estuary" of the Chesapeake Bay. It is described as intolerant of shade.

S. alterniflorus is noted for its capacity to act as an environmental engineer. It grows out into the water at the seaward edge of a salt marsh, and accumulates sediment and enables other habitat-engineering species, such as mussels, to settle. This accumulation of sediment and other substrate-building species gradually builds up the level of the land at the seaward edge, and other, higher-marsh species move onto the new land. As the marsh accretes, S. alterniflorus moves still further out to form a new edge. S. alterniflorus grows in tallest forms at the outermost edge of a given marsh, displaying shorter morphologies up onto the landward side of the Sporobolus belt.

S. alterniflorus is native to the Atlantic coast of the Americas from Newfoundland, Canada, south to northern Argentina, where it forms a dominant part of brackish coastal saltmarshes.

The caterpillars of Aaron's skipper (Poanes aaroni) have only been found on this species to date.

== Problems as an invasive species ==
Sporobolus alterniflorus can become an invasive plant outside its native range, either by itself or by hybridizing with native species and interfering with the propagation of the pure native strain. The grass can hinder water circulation and drainage or block boating channels. Meadows of S. alterniflorus can crowd out native species, reducing biodiversity and altering the environment; as a result of S. alterniflorus's growth, invertebrates that live in mud flats disappear as their habitat is overgrown, and in turn, food sources shrink for birds who feed on those invertebrates.

One example of an invasive Sporobolus alterniflorus hybrid is that of Sporobolus anglicus. S. anglicus is a fertile polyploid derived from the hybrid S.alterniflorus × townsendii (S. alterniflorus × S. maritimus), first found when American S. alterniflorus was introduced to southern England in about 1870 and came into contact with the local native S. maritimus. S. anglica has a variety of traits that allow it to outcompete native plants, including a high saline tolerance and the ability to perform photosynthesis at lower temperatures more productively than other similar plants. It can grow on a wider range of sediments than other species of the genus Sporobolus, and can survive inundation in salt water for longer periods of time. S. anglicus has since spread throughout northwest Europe, and (following introduction for erosion control) eastern North America.

The world's largest invasion of Sporobolus alterniflorus is in China, where plants from multiple North American locations were intentionally planted starting in 1979 with the intention of providing shore protection and sediment capture. The invasion has spread to over 34,000 hectares in ten provinces and Hong Kong.

In Willapa Bay of Washington state, Sporobolus alterniflorus was probably an accidental introduction during oyster transplants during the nineteenth century and may have dispersed from there to other parts of the state. At its peak of infestation in 2003, it covered approximately 3,000 hectares (more than 8,500 acres), spread across an area of 8,000 hectares (20,000 acres). As of 2016, the infestation had been reduced to less than 3 solid hectares (7 acres).

In California, four species of exotic Sporobolus (S. alterniflorus, S. densiflora, S. patens, and S. anglicus) have been introduced to the San Francisco Bay region. Sporobolus alterniflorus is well established in San Francisco Bay, and has had the greatest impact of all the cordgrasses in San Francisco Bay. It was introduced in 1973 by the Army Corps of Engineers in an attempt to reclaim marshland, and was spread and replanted around the bay in further restoration projects. It demonstrated an ability to outcompete the native S. foliosa, and to potentially eliminate it from San Francisco Bay.

Sporobolus alterniflorus has also been found to hybridize with S. foliosa, producing offspring Sporobolus alterniflorus × S. foliosa that may be an even greater threat than S. alterniflorus by itself. The hybrid can physically modify the environment to the detriment of native species, and the hybrid populations have spread into creeks, bays, and more remote coastal locations. The hybrids produce enormous amounts of pollen, which swamp the stigmas of the native S. foliosa flowers to produce even larger numbers of hybrid offspring, leaving the affected native Sporobolus species little chance to produce unhybridized offspring. The hybrids also produce much larger numbers of fertile seeds than the native Sporobolus species, and are producing a hybrid population that, left unchecked, can increase not only in population size but also in its rate of population growth. The hybrids may also be able to fertilize themselves, which the native Sporobolus species cannot do, thus increasing the spread of the hybrid swarm even further. As of 2014, eradication efforts had reduced the infestation of S. alterniflorus and hybrids in the San Francisco Bay Area by 96%, from 323 net hectares at its peak to 12 net hectares. Taller than either of the parent species, the hybrid provides good shelter to Ridgway's rail, an occasional roadblock to its eradication.

Several means of control and eradication have been employed against Sporobolus alterniflorus where it has become a pest. Hand pulling is ineffective because even small rhizome fragments that inevitably break off and get left in the soil are capable of sending up new shoots. Imazapyr, an herbicide, is approved for aquatic use and is used effectively in Washington and California to kill it. In Willapa Bay, leafhopper bugs (Prokelisia marginata) were employed to kill the plants, which threaten the oyster industry there, but this method did not contain the invasion. Surveys by air, land, and sea are conducted in infested and threatened areas near San Francisco to determine the spread of Sporobolus species.
