= List of Ngorongoro Crater plants =

Below is an alphabetical list of plants occurring in the Ngorongoro Crater in Tanzania.

Ngorongoro Crater covers an area of 265 square kilometres and is thought to have been formed from the collapse of a volcanic mountain which had become inactive. Its rim lies some 2280 meters above sea level, while the floor is at 1800 meters. The diversity of landforms and altitude has produced similarly diverse habitats of mountains, gallery forests, craters, grassy plains, black folk, lakes and woodlands, ranging from arid and semi-arid communities below 1,300 m with abundant grazing to montane vegetation with tall grassland, open moors and relict evergreen montane forests on the steep slopes. There is a large stand of bamboo, Yushania alpina, on Oldeani (an extinct volcano of 3,188 meters) and Pencil Cedar, Juniperus procera, on Makarut Mountain. There are four extinct volcanic peaks, all over 3,000 meters, the highest of which is Loolmalasin (3,648 m). Within the crater lies Lake Magadi, a small soda lake. (Hillary Remen)

The crater floor consists of shortgrass savanna punctuated by shallow, fresh and brackish lakes, marshes and swamps. Two notable forests are Lerai Forest and Laiyanai Forest, while the surrounds of Lake Eyasi are dominated by Acacia mellifera and Dalbergia melanoxylon during the dry season.

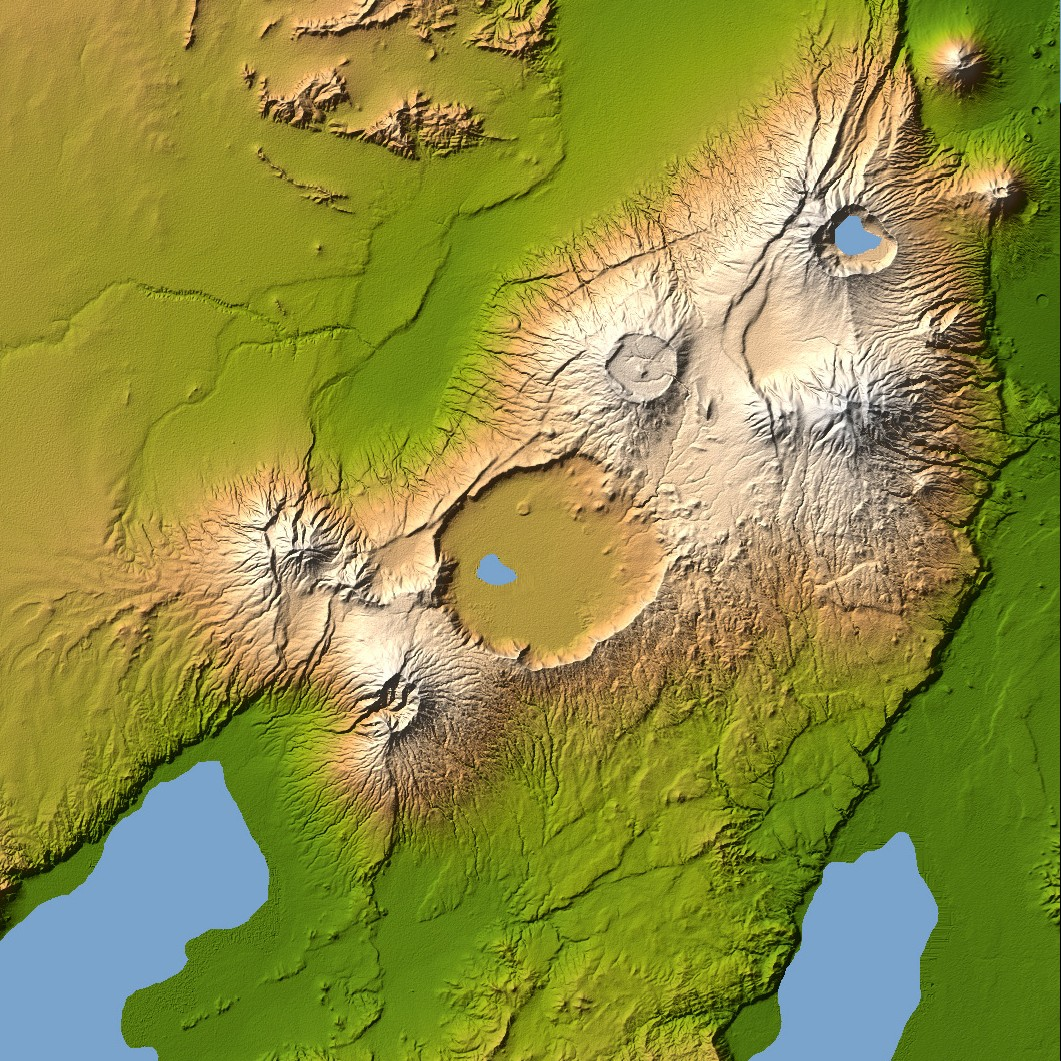
The lakes south of the crater are Lake Eyasi and Lake Manyara

== Trees, shrubs and lianes ==
- Abutilon indicum (L.) Sweet
- Abutilon longicuspe Hochst. ex A.Rich.
- Abutilon mauritianum (Jacq.) Medik.
- Acacia abyssinica Benth.
- Acacia drepanolobium Sjostedt
- Acacia hockii De Wild.
- Acacia lahai Benth.
- Acacia mearnsii De Wild.
- Acacia mellifera subsp. detinens (Burch.) Brenan
- Acacia nilotica (L.) Delile
- Acacia oerfota (Forssk.) Schweinf.
- Acacia senegal (L.) Willd.
- Acacia seyal Delile
- Acacia xanthophloea Benth.
- Adansonia digitata L.
- Aeschynomene schimperi A.Rich.
- Albizia gummifera (J.F.Gmel.) C.A.Sm.
- Albizia harveyi E.Fourn.
- Albizia petersiana (Bolle) Oliv.
- Azanza garckeana (F.Hoffm.) Exell & Hillc.
- Balanites aegyptiaca (L.) Delile
- Bersama abyssinica Fresen.
- Cadaba farinosa Forssk.
- Caesalpinia decapetala (Roth) Alston
- Calodendrum capense (L.f.) Thunb.
- Capparis fascicularis DC.
- Capparis tomentosa Lam.
- Cassipourea malosana (Baker) Alston
- Celtis africana Burm.f.
- Cissus cactiformis Gilg
- Cissus quadrangularis L.
- Clausena anisata (Willd.) Hook.f. ex Benth.
- Clutia abyssinica Jaub. & Spach
- Commiphora africana (A.Rich.) Endl.
- Commiphora madagascariensis Jacq.
- Combretum apiculatum Sond.
- Combretum molle R.Br. ex G.Don
- Cordia ovalis R. Br.
- Cordia sinensis Lam.
- Coptosperma graveolens (S.Moore) Degreef
- Crotalaria agatiflora subsp. imperialis (Taub.) Polhill
- Croton dichogamus Pax
- Croton macrostachyus Hochst. ex Delile
- Cussonia holstii Harms ex Engl.
- Cussonia spicata Thunb.
- Dalbergia melanoxylon Guill. & Perr.
- Dombeya rotundifolia (Hochst.) Planch.
- Ekebergia capensis Sparrm.
- Erica arborea L.
- Erythrina abyssinica DC.
- Euclea divinorum Hiern
- Euphorbia candelabrum Trémaux ex Kotschy
- Euphorbia schimperi C.Presl
- Euphorbia tirucalli
- Faidherbia albida (Delile) A.Chev.
- Ficus thonningii Blume
- Grewia damine Gaertn.
- Gutenbergia cordifolia Benth. ex Oliv.
- Hagenia abyssinica (Bruce ex Steud.) J.F.Gmel.
- Helichrysum splendidum (Thunb.) Less.
- Heteromorpha trifoliata (H.L.Wendl.) Eckl. & Zeyh.
- Hibiscus aponeurus Sprague & Hutch.
- Hibiscus flavifolius Ulbr.
- Hyphaene petersiana Klotzsch ex Mart.
- Hypoestes verticillaris (L.f.) Sol. ex Roem. & Schult.
- Indigofera arrecta A.Rich.
- Juniperus procera Hochst. ex Endl.
- Justicia matammensis (Schweinf.) Oliv.
- Lantana camara L.
- Lantana trifolia L.
- Lantana ukambensis (Vatke) Verdc.
- Lantana viburnoides (Forssk.) Vahl
- Lasiosiphon glaucus Fresen.
- Leonotis ocymifolia var. raineriana (Vis.) Iwarsson
- Lippia javanica (Burm.f.) Spreng.
- Lonicera japonica Thunb.
- Markhamia zanzibarica (Bojer ex DC.) K.Schum.
- Melhania ovataSpreng.
- Nuxia congesta R.Br. ex Fresen.
- Olea capensis subsp. macrocarpa (C.H.Wright) I.Verd.
- Olea europaea subsp. cuspidata (Wall. & G.Don) Cif.
- Olea welwitschii (Knobl.) Gilg & G.Schellenb.
- Ozoroa insignis subsp. reticulata (Baker f.) J.B.Gillett
- Pavonia burchellii (DC.) R.A.Dyer
- Pluchea ovalis (Pers.) DC.
- Podocarpus milanjianus Rendle
- Rauvolfia afra Sond.
- Salvadora persica L.
- Senna didymobotrya (Fresen.) H.S.Irwin & Barneby
- Sida ovata Forssk.
- Solanecio mannii (Hook.f.) C.Jeffrey
- Stigmatorhynchus umbelliferus (K. Schum.) Schltr.
- Terminalia brownii Fresen.
- Tinnea aethiopica Kotschy ex Hook.f.
- Trifolium rueppellianum Fresen.
- Vachellia gerrardi (Benth.) P.J.H.Hurter
- Vachellia tortilis (Forssk.) Galasso & Banfi
- Vangueria madagascariensis J.F.Gmel.
- Vepris nobilis (Delile) Mziray
- Vernonia auriculifera Hiern
- Zanthoxylum chalybeum Engl.
- Ziziphus mucronata Willd.

== Herbs ==
- Acalypha fruticosa Forssk.
- Achyranthes aspera L.
- Anthospermum usambarense K.Schum.
- Argemone mexicana L.
- Artemisia afra Jacq. ex Willd.
- Aspilia mossambicensis (Oliv.) Wild
- Bidens schimperi Sch.Bip. ex Walp.
- Datura stramonium L.
- Galatella sedifolia (L.) Greuter
- Heliotropium steudneri Vatke
- Justicia betonica L.
- Medicago laciniata (L.) Mill.
- Murdannia nudiflora (L.) Brenan
- Nicandra physalodes (L.) Gaertn.
- Ocimum gratissimum L.
- Sansevieria ehrenbergii Schweinf. ex Baker
- Solanum incanum L.
- Spilanthes mauritiana (A.Rich. ex Pers.) DC.
- Tagetes minuta L.
- Tribulus terrestris L.

== Sedges ==
- Cyperus dives Delile
- Cyperus laevigatus L.
- Cyperus papyrus L.
- Cyperus rigidifolius Steud.
- Cyperus rotundus L.

== Grasses ==
- Andropogon greenwayi Napper
- Aristida adscensionis L.
- Bothriochloa insculpta (A.Rich.) A.Camus
- Brachiaria eruciformis (Sm.) Griseb.
- Brachiaria umbratilis Napper
- Cenchrus ciliaris L.
- Chloris gayana Kunth
- Chloris pycnothrix Trin.
- Cymbopogon nardus (L.) Rendle
- Cynodon dactylon (L.) Pers.
- Cynodon nlemfuensis Vanderyst
- Cynodon plectostachyus (K.Schum.) Pilg.
- Dactyloctenium aegyptium (L.) Willd.
- Digitaria abyssinica (A.Rich.) Stapf
- Digitaria milanjiana (Rendle) Stapf
- Eleusine jaegeri Pilg.
- Enneapogon persicus Boiss.
- Eragrostis patula (Kunth) Steud.
- Eustachys paspaloides (Vahl) Lanza & Mattei
- Harpachne schimperi A.Rich.
- Heteropogon contortus (L.) P.Beauv. ex Roem. & Schult.
- Hyparrhenia hirta (L.) Stapf
- Leersia hexandra Sw.
- Leptochloa fusca (L.) Kunth
- Odyssea paucinervis Stapf
- Panicum coloratum L.
- Panicum repens L.
- Pennisetum clandestinum Hochst. ex Chiov.
- Pennisetum riparium Hochst. ex A.Rich.
- Pennisetum sphacelatum (Nees) T.Durand & Schinz
- Phragmites mauritianus Kunth
- Setaria pumila (Poir.) Roem. & Schult.
- Setaria sphacelata (Schumach.) Stapf & C.E.Hubb. ex Moss
- Sporobolus indicus (L.) R.Br.
- Sporobolus consimilis Fresen.
- Sporobolus fimbriatus (Trin.) Nees
- Sporobolus ioclados (Trin.) Nees
- Sporobolus sanguineus Rendle
- Sporobolus spicatus (Vahl) Kunth
- Themeda triandra Forssk.
- Urochloa panicoides P.Beauv.
- Yushania alpina (K.Schum.) W.C.Lin

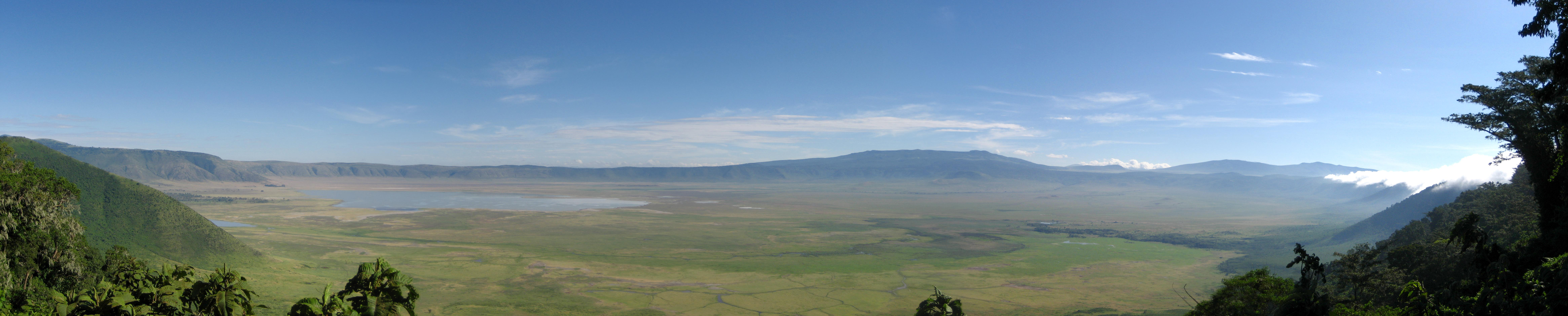
Panoramic view of Ngorongoro Crater.
