= Nocca =

Nocca may refer to:

== People ==
- Antonia (Italian singer), stage name of Italian singer-songwriter Antonia Nocca (born 2005)
- Domenico Nocca (1758–1841), Italian abbot and botanist

== Other uses ==
- New Orleans Center for Creative Arts, regional, pre-professional arts training center for high school students in Louisiana
- Nocca, a synonym of the plant genus Lagascea in the family Asteraceae
