= Yala National Park =

National park in Sri Lanka

- IUCN category II (national park)
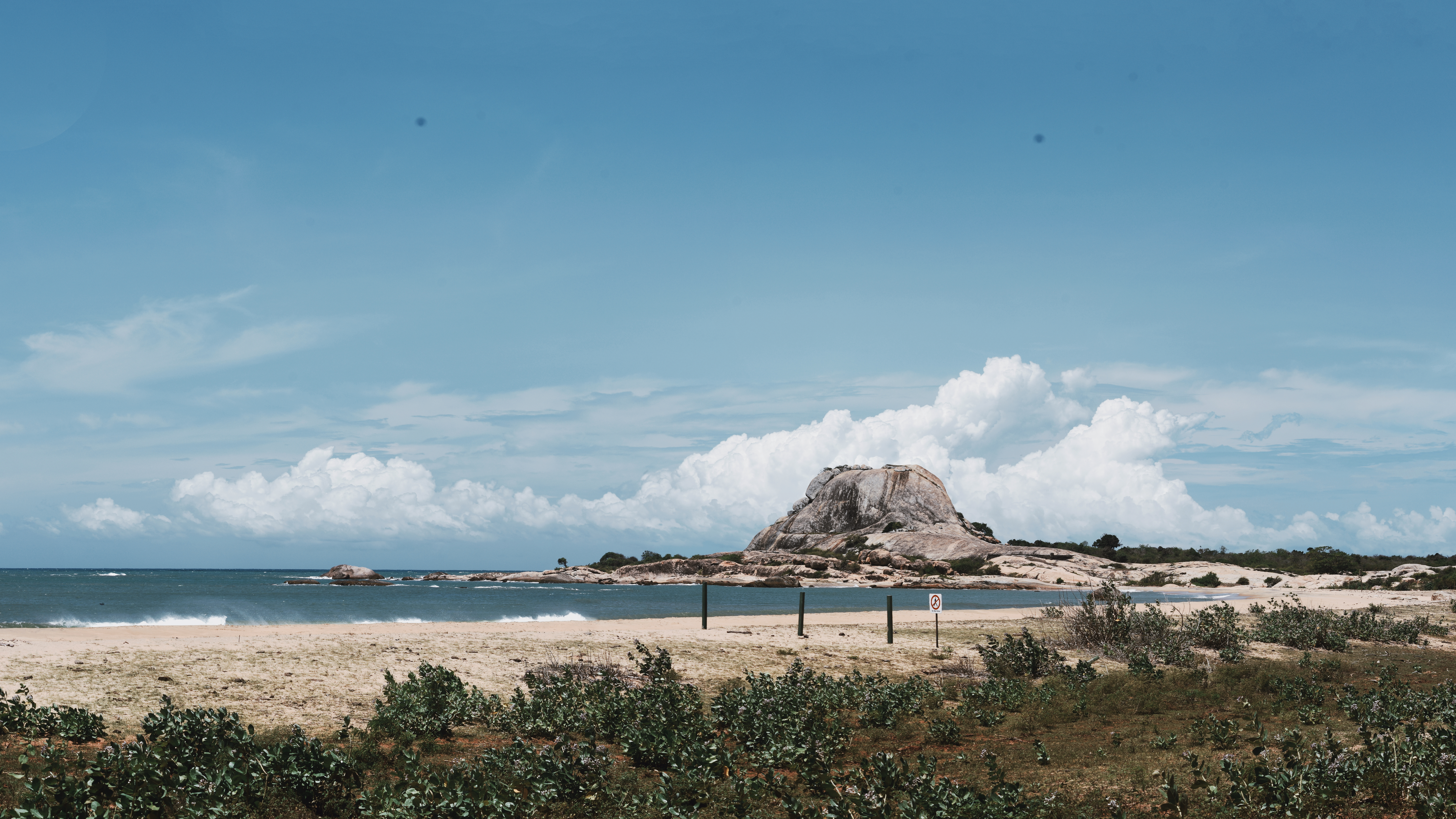
- Patanangala, a rock outcrop in the Yala beach

- Location within Sri Lanka
- Location: Uva, Eastern and Southern Provinces, Sri Lanka
- Nearest city: Kataragama
- Coordinates: 6°33′N 81°30′E
- Area: 978.807 km^{2} (377.919 sq mi)
- Established: 1900 (Wildlife sanctuary); 1938 (National park)
- Governing body: Department of Wildlife Conservation

Yala National Park is a national park in Sri Lanka, bordering the Indian Ocean and covering 979 km^{2} (378 sq mi). It was designated as a wildlife sanctuary in 1900. It hosts diverse ecosystems ranging from moist monsoon forests to freshwater and marine wetlands, and is important for the conservation of Sri Lankan elephants, Sri Lankan leopards and 44 mammal species. It is one of the 70 Important Bird Areas in Sri Lanka harbouring 215 bird species including six endemic species of Sri Lanka.

The area around Yala National Park has hosted several ancient civilizations. Two important Buddhist pilgrim sites, Sithulpahuwa and Magul Vihara, are situated within the park. The 2004 Indian Ocean earthquake and tsunami caused severe damage on the Yala National Park, and 250 people died in its vicinity.

== History ==
In 1560 Spanish cartographer Cipriano Sánchez noted Yala in his map "is abandoned for 300 years due to insalubrious conditions". Chief Justice Sir Alexander Johnston wrote a detailed account on Yala in 1806 after travelling from Trincomalee to Hambantota. On 23 March 1900, the government proclaimed Yala and Wilpattu reserves under the Forest Ordinance. Initially the extent of the reserve was 389 square kilometres (150 mi^{2}) between the Menik and Kumbukkan Rivers. At that time the reserve did not bear the name Yala. The Game Protection Society (now the Wildlife and Nature Protection Society) was instrumental in establishing the reserve. The forest area between Palatupana and Yala was declared a hunting site reserved only for the resident sportsmen.

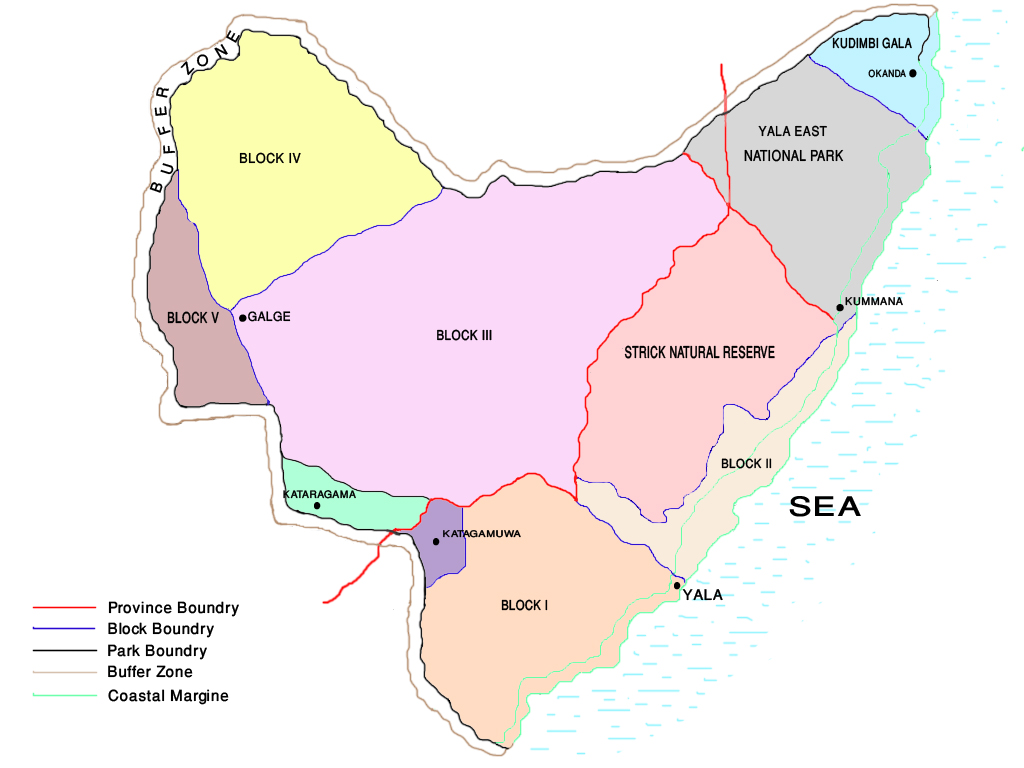
Map of the National Park

On 1 March 1938, Yala became a national park when the Flora and Fauna Protection Ordinance was passed into law by D. S. Senanayake, the minister of agriculture. The park consists of five blocks. Subsequently, four other blocks were incorporated to the park. There are six national parks and three wildlife sanctuaries in the vicinity of Yala. Kumana National Park, Yala Strict Nature Reserve and Kataragama, Katagamuwa, and Nimalawa sanctuaries are continuous with the park.

Block	Extent	Date added to the park
Block I	14,101 hectares (54.44 mi^{2})	1938
Block II	9,931 hectares (38.34 mi^{2})	1954
Block III	40,775 hectares (157.43 mi^{2})	1967
Block IV	26,418 hectares (102.00 mi^{2})	1969
Block V	6,656 hectares (25.70 mi^{2})	1973
Source: Sri Lanka Wetlands Information and Database

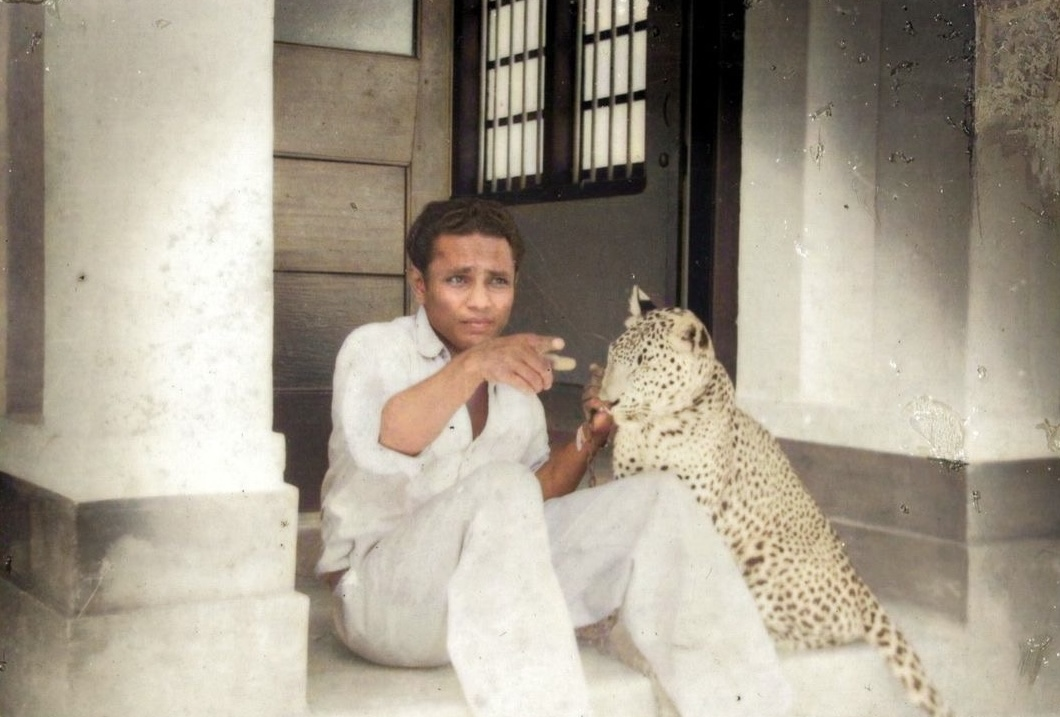
Game Ranger Liyanage John Stanley Fernando with a rescued leopard cub at Yala, 1958

In 1958, Game Ranger Liyanage John Stanley Fernando was photographed at Yala National Park with a rescued leopard cub, capturing a moment in Sri Lanka's conservation history. The leopard cub was later transferred to the National Zoological Gardens in Dehiwala, Colombo, as part of early collaboration between the Department of Wildlife and the Zoo in animal care and rehabilitation. This image is preserved in a private family archive and is available on Wikimedia Commons as a historical record of Yala's formative years in wildlife management.

== Physical features ==
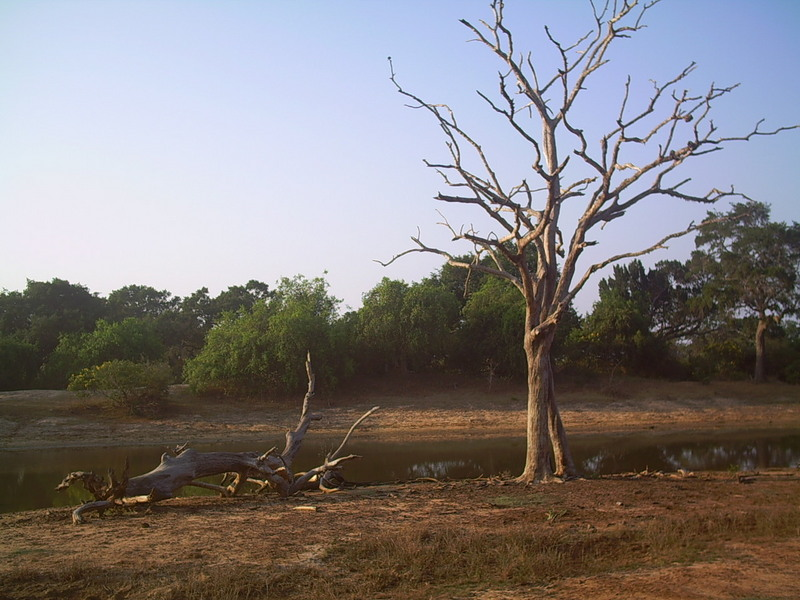
Surface water becomes critical in the dry season.

The Yala area is mostly composed of metamorphic rock belonging to the Precambrian era and classified into two series, Vijayan series and Highland series. Reddish brown soil and low humic grey soil are prominent among six soil types. Yala is situated in the lowest peneplain of Sri Lanka, which extends from Trincomalee to Hambantota. Topographically the area is a flat and mildly undulating plain that runs to the coast with an elevation of 30 metres (98 ft) close to the coast while rising in the interior to 100–125 metres (328–410 ft). The national park is situated in the dry semi-arid climatic region and rain is received mainly during the northeast monsoon. The mean annual rainfall ranges between 500–775 mm (19.7–30.5 in) while the mean temperature ranges between 26.4 °C (79.5 °F) in January to 30 °C (86 °F) in April. It is windier in Yala, during the southwest monsoon compared to the wind during the northeast monsoon with wind speeds from 23 kilometres per hour (14 mph) to 15 kilometres per hour (9.3 mph).

Water is abundant after the northeast monsoon, but during the dry season surface water becomes an important factor. The bodies of surface water appear in the forms of streams, tanks, waterholes, rock pools, and lagoons. Waterholes occur in low lying places while rock pools of varying size are capable of containing water year-round, and are hence an important source of water for elephants. For many water birds and water buffaloes natural waterholes are ideal habitats. Such reservoirs are largely concentrated to the Block I followed by Block II. Several tanks are there including Maha Seelawa, Buthawa, Uraniya, and Pilinnawa tanks. Many rivers and streams flow in a southeasterly direction, originating in the highlands of adjacent Uva and central hills. Kumbukkan Oya in the east and Menik River and its tributaries in the west flow across the park, and provide an important water source in the dry season to wild animals of the park. Normally the streams of the park are dry during the drought season. These rivers and streams exhibit a degree of runoff fluctuations between wet and dry seasons. Kumbukkan Oya discharges seven times as much water in the rainy season than in the dry season. A number of lagoons are situated along the coast line of the park. There are several routes to get to Yala from Colombo, while the route via Ratnapura and Tissamaharama is the shortest with 270 kilometres (170 mi).

== Impact of the 2004 tsunami ==
Yala National Park lay in the direct path of the 2004 Indian Ocean earthquake, which impacted Sri Lanka 90 minutes after its generation. The tsunami caused severe but localized damage on the park, with around 250 people being killed. The tsunami wave was reported to be 20 feet (6.1 m) high. The tsunami waves reached inland only through the river-mouth gaps in the coastal dunes. Inundation distances ranged up to 392 to 1,490 m (429 to 1,629 yd). The main habitats affected are scrub forest and grasslands. About 5,000 ha (19 mi^{2}) of grassland, forest, and wetland were directly affected by the tsunami. The satellite images revealed that mean normalized difference vegetation index (NDVI) range from 0.245 to 0.772 in the Block I and II. After the disaster the NDVI value fell dramatically to 0.2111. Around 60% of the area along the coastline has changed. The damage was worse closer to the sea. The movement patterns of two radio collared elephants were analyzed. The study found out that their movements were consistent with behaviour prompted by immediate cues generated by the tsunami waves rather than a response to a "sixth sense".

== Flora ==
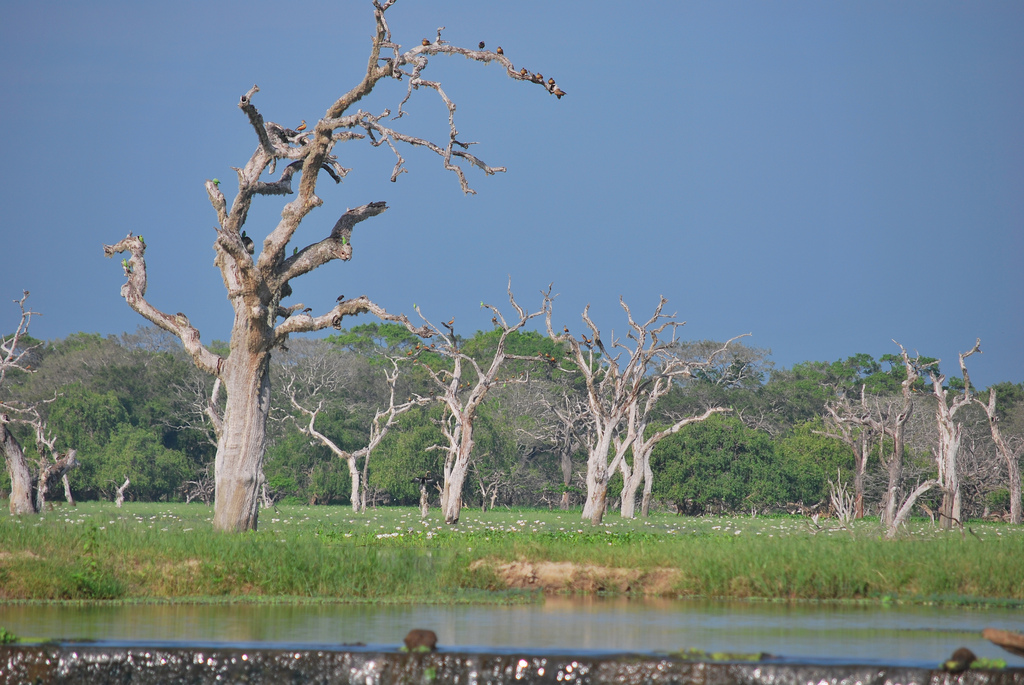
Wetlands are one of the habitat types of Yala.

Yala National Park has a variety of ecosystems including moist monsoon forests, dry monsoon forests, semi deciduous forests, thorn forests, grasslands, marshes, marine wetlands, and sandy beaches. The area under forest cover mainly consists of Block I and rangelands of open parkland (pelessa grasslands) including some extensive grasslands. The forest area is restricted to around the Menik River while rangelands are found towards the sea side. Other habitat types of the Block I are tanks and water holes, lagoons and mangroves and chena lands. The mangrove vegetation in the Buthuwa lagoon is largely Rhizophora mucronata while Avicennia spp. and Aegiceras spp. are less abundant. The vegetation of Block II is similar to that of Block I, and Yalawela, once a fertile paddy field, represents pitiya grasslands. The mangroves of Block II occur around the estuary of Menik River, which extend to 100 hectares (0.39 mi^{2}). The common mangrove plants are Rhizophora mucronata, Sonneratia caseolaris, Avicennia spp., and Aegiceras corniculatum. The lagoons of Pilinnawa, Mahapothana, and Pahalapothana are also located in this block. The other common mangrove species are Acanthus ilicifolius, Excoecaria agallocha, and Lumnitzera racemosa. In the bare sand Crinum zeylanicum is found.

In the Blocks III, IV, and V, forests are more widespread. The canopy of the forest mainly contains Drypetes sepiaria and Manilkara hexandra plant species. The Pitiya grasslands are important for grazing animals. Cynodon barberi is the common grass in pitiya grasslands while Zoysia matrella becomes dominant near the beach. Among 300 odd floral species are Manilkara hexandra, Drypetes sepiaria, Ceylon satinwood, Terminalia arjuna, limonia, Berrya cordifolia, Randia dumetorum, Pleurostylia opposita, Gymnema sylvestre, bell mimosa, neem, banyan, toothbrush tree, Schleichera oleosa, Vitex pinnata, Indian blackberry, Gmelina asiatica, Carissa spinarum, Euphorbia antiquorum, and Acacia eburnea. In the seasonally flooded areas of Block II, a wild species of rice is found. Glenniea unijuga is an endemic plant species found around the wetlands of the park. Munronia pumila, Salacia reticulata, and Asparagus racemosus are some medicinal plants.

== Fauna ==
=== Birds ===
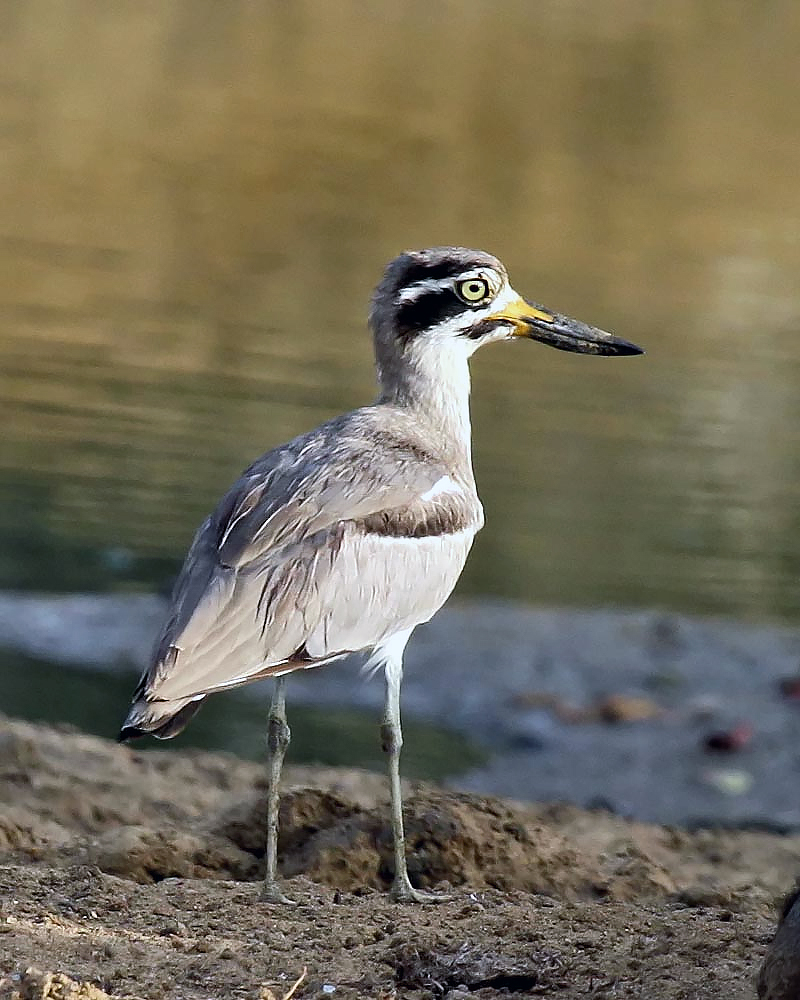
The great stone-curlew (great thick-knee) is a waterbird found in the park.

Yala is one of the 70 Important Bird Areas (IBAs) in Sri Lanka. Of 215 bird species of the park, seven are endemic to Sri Lanka. They are Sri Lanka grey hornbill, Sri Lanka junglefowl, Sri Lanka wood pigeon, crimson-fronted barbet, black-capped bulbul, blue-tailed bee-eater and brown-capped babbler. The number of waterbirds inhabiting wetlands of Yala is 90 and half of them are migrants. Waterfowl (lesser whistling duck, garganey), cormorants (little cormorant, Indian cormorant), large waterbirds (grey heron, black-headed ibis, Eurasian spoonbill, Asian openbill, painted stork), medium-sized waders Tringa spp., and small waders Charadrius spp. are among the most common waterbirds. Black-necked stork and lesser adjutant are many of the rare birds that can be seen in the park. The migrant great white pelican and resident spot-billed pelican have also been recorded. Other waterbirds attracted to the Yala lagoons include lesser flamingo, pelicans, and rare species such as purple heron, night herons, egrets, purple swamphen, and Oriental darter. Thousands of waterfowls migrate to the lagoons of Yala during the northeast monsoon. They are northern pintail, white-winged tern, Eurasian curlew, Eurasian whimbrel, godwits, and ruddy turnstone. The visiting species mingled with residing lesser whistling duck, yellow-wattled lapwing, red-wattled lapwing, and great stone-curlew. Rock pigeon, barred buttonquail, Indian peafowl, black stork, black-winged stilt, and greater flamingo are among the other bird species. Crested serpent eagle and white-bellied sea eagle are the raptors of the park. The forest birds are orange-breasted green pigeon, hornbills, Old World flycatchers, Indian paradise flycatcher, Asian barbets, and orioles.

=== Mammals ===
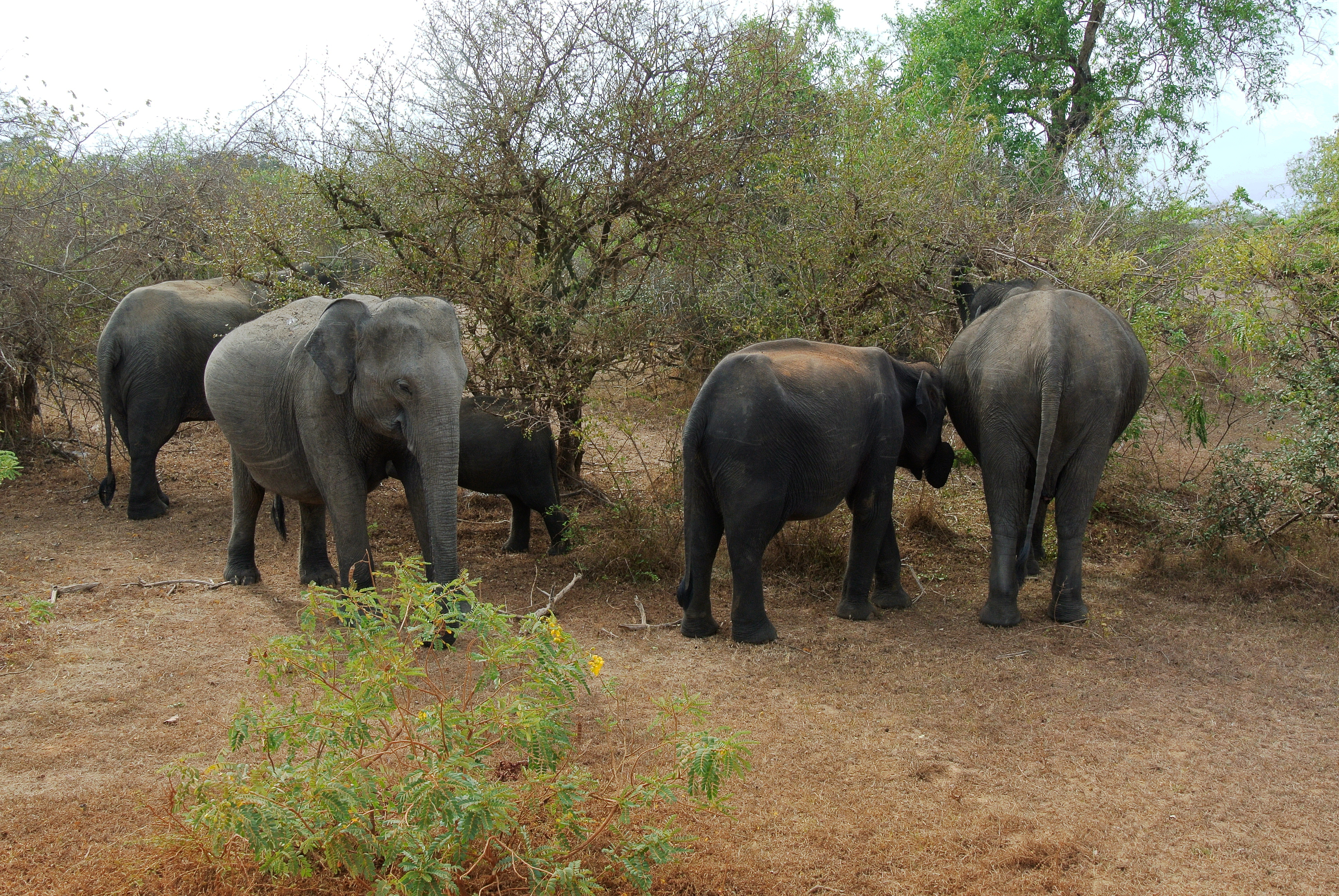
Streams in the park can sustain a large herd of Sri Lankan elephants.

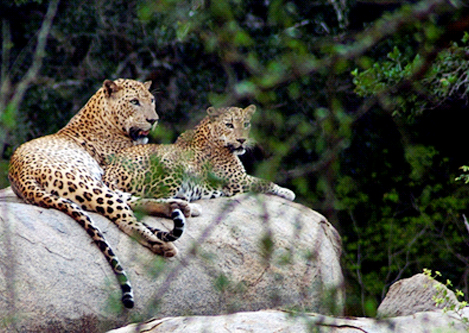
Yala has the highest leopard concentration in the world.

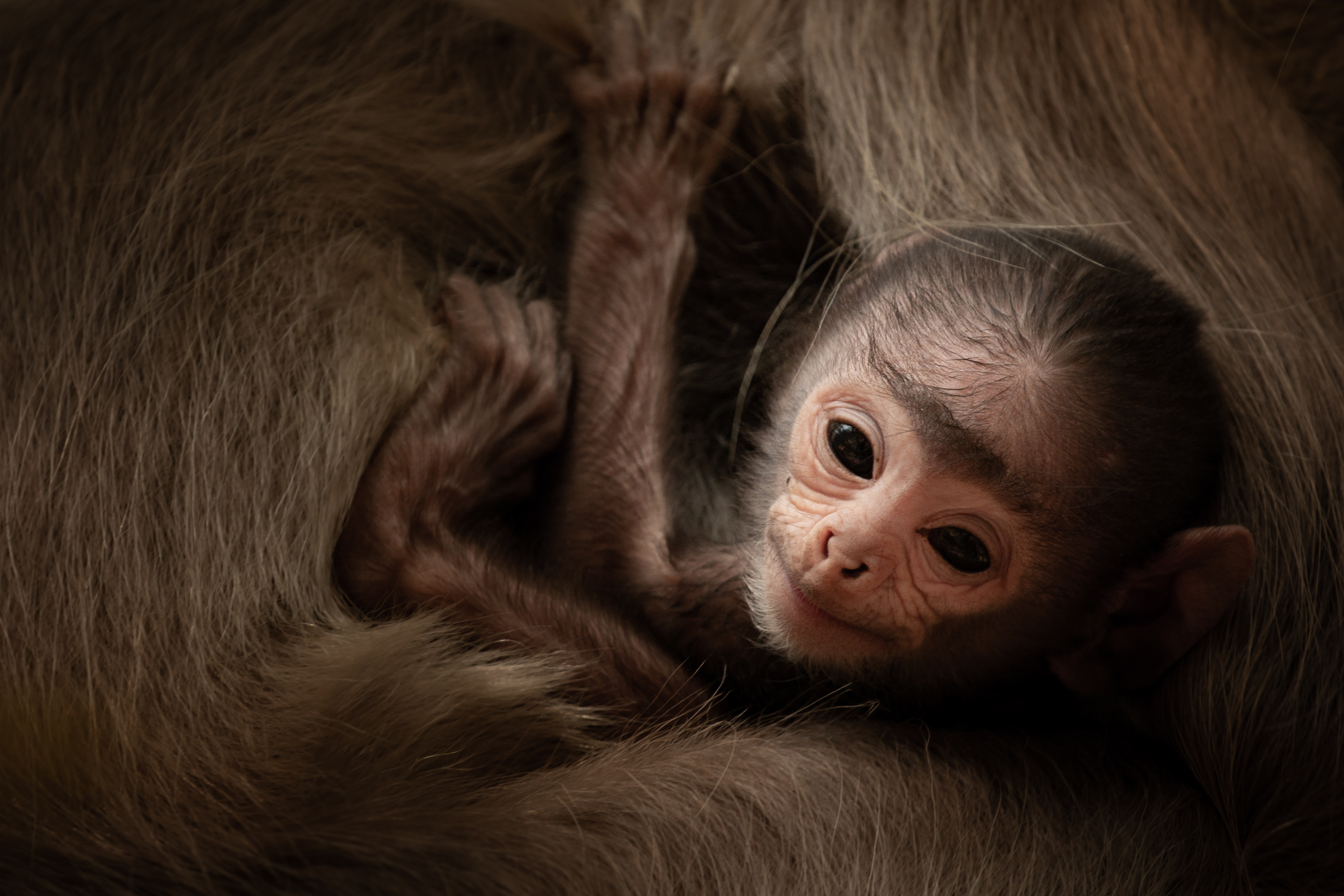
Baby tufted gray langur

Including Sri Lankan elephant, 44 species of mammals are resident in Yala National Park, and it has one of the highest leopard population densities in the world. As of 1982, 25 individual Sri Lankan leopards are estimated to roam in Block I. The Sri Lankan sloth bear, leopard, elephant, and wild water buffalo are all threatened mammals that Yala harbours. Although the water buffalo is indigenous to Sri Lanka, most populations contain genes of cattle or have descended from feral populations. Toque macaque, golden palm civet, red slender loris, and fishing cat are among the other mammals that can be seen in Yala. The elephant population of the park varies seasonally.

=== Reptiles ===
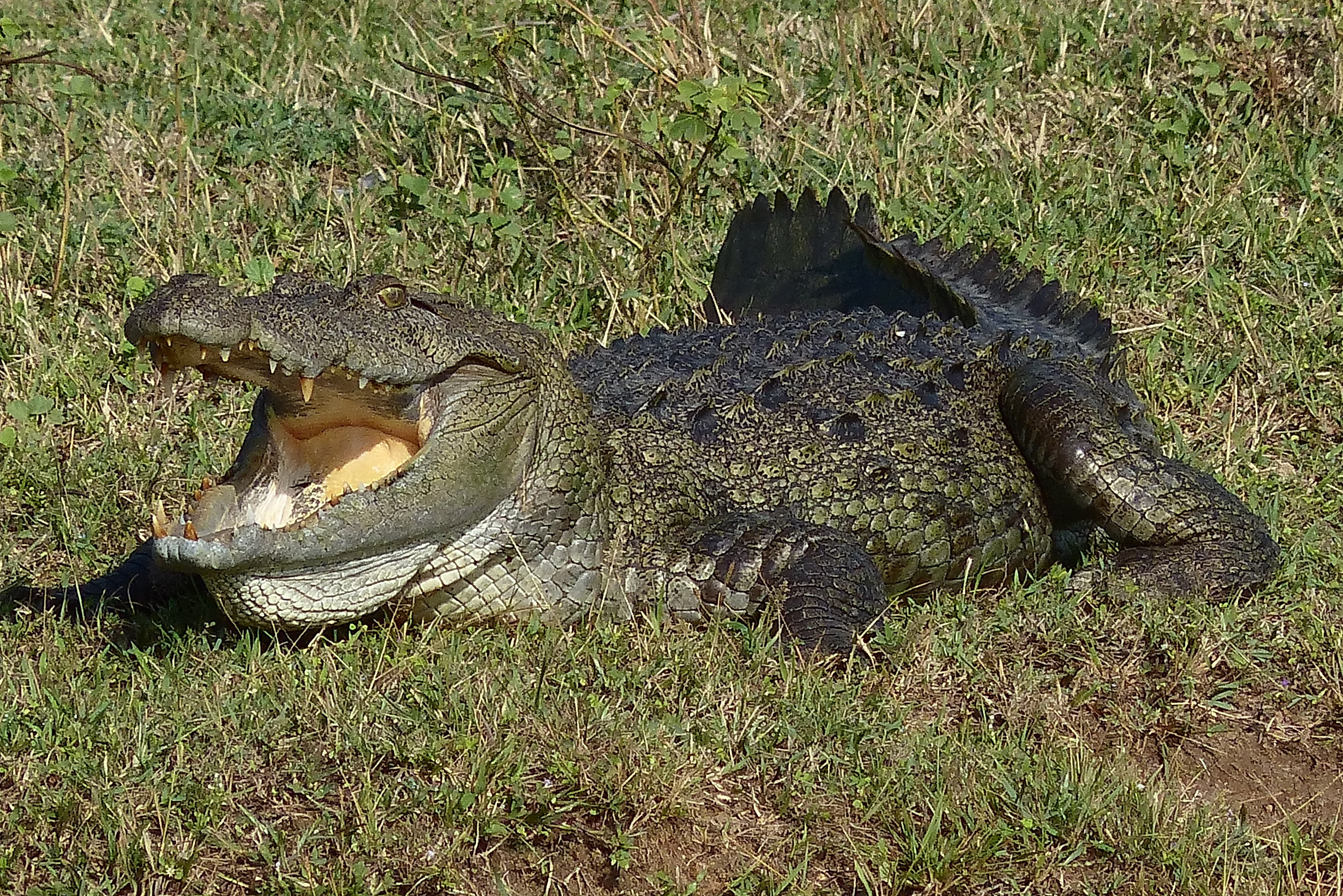
Mugger crocodile

Yala National Park hosts 47 reptile species including mugger crocodile and saltwater crocodile, Asian water monitor, Bengal monitor, Indian cobra and Russell's viper. Six endemic reptiles encompass Sri Lankan krait, Boulenger's keelback, Sri Lankan flying snake, painted-lip lizard, Wiegmann's agama, and Bahir's fan-throated lizard. The coastal line of the park is visited by all five globally endangered sea turtles leatherback turtle, olive ridley, loggerhead sea turtle, hawksbill turtle, and green turtle.

=== Fish ===
In the water courses of Yala, 21 freshwater fish are found. The fish population in the perennial reservoirs contains mostly exotic food fish Mozambique tilapia. The stone sucker and Esomus thermoicos are endemic among other species. The blackspot barb, olive barb, orange chromide and common spiny loach are the common fish species.

=== Invertebrates ===
Crabs and prawns are part of the fauna in the lagoons of the park.

A variety of butterfly species is found here. The common bluebottle, common lime butterfly, crimson rose, common Jezebel, and common Mormon are the common species.

== Cultural importance ==
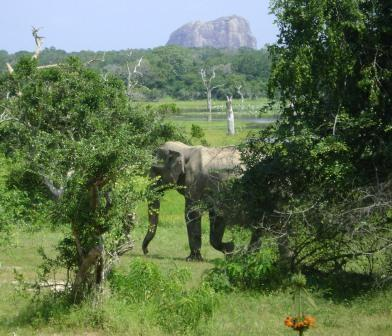
Wild elephants are commonly found in Yala. Elephant Rock is in the background.

Yala had been a center of past civilisations. King Ravana, the mythical Hindu anti-hero is believed to have established his kingdom here with Ravana Kotte, now submerged in the sea, as its boundary. Seafaring traders brought Indo-Aryan civilisation with them, as Yala is situated in their trading route. A large number of ancient although disrepaired tanks are the evidence of a rich hydraulic and agricultural civilisation dating back to 5th century BC. Situlpahuwa, which was the home for 12,000 arahants, is situated within the park area along with Magul Vihara, which was built in 87 BC and Akasa Chaitiya, which was constructed in 2nd century BC. Agriculture flourished in area during the period of Ruhuna Kingdom. According to Mahavamsa, the Kingdom of Ruhuna began to decline by the end of the 13th century AD. During the colonial period Yala became a popular hunting ground. Yala is annually visited by 400,000 pilgrims.

== Conservation and threats ==
Poaching, gem-mining, logging, encroachment by agriculture, and free-roaming domestic livestock are the main threats to the park. Three wardens have been killed in clashes with poachers. Gems are mined along the Menik River and holes created by gem mining, which extend up to 30 metres (98 ft), can be seen along the Kumbukkan Oya. In Blocks III and IV, the encroachment is severe as chena cultivation and burning, to provide grazing in the dry season, collides with the boundary. A large grove of Sonneratia caseolaris is faced with forest dieback in the Menik River's estuary. Cultivation of tobacco, noise and air pollution caused by uncontrolled tourism are the other conservation issues. The growth of invasive alien species such as Lantana camara, Opuntia dillenii, Chromolaena odorata is threatening the native plants.

Deep within the forest, Ganja is cultivated in cleared areas. The wildlife is poached and disturbed by the fishermen at Patanangala. The turtles are caught in fishing nets and the fishermen also litter the beach with debris. They have also set traps inland and dig up turtle nests. In the absence of hand-weeding, which was practiced until the 1950s, the transformation of interior grasslands to scrub jungle is unavoidable. Tourism has created problems in the past, such as vehicles harassing wild animals. The issue is most severe in Sithulpahuwa where thousands of pilgrims visit, leading to a great degree of commercialisation. Department of Wildlife Conservation has taken some conservation measures such as management of grazing lands, conservation of small water ponds, and eradication of invasive alien species. A 40 km (25 mi) long electric fence was erected to prevent elephants from moving into nearby villages.
