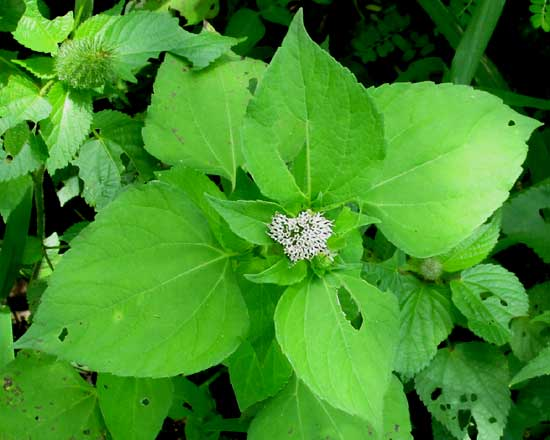
- Lagascea mollis flowering stem

Scientific classification
- Kingdom: Plantae
- Clade: Embryophytes
- Clade: Tracheophytes
- Clade: Spermatophytes
- Clade: Angiosperms
- Clade: Eudicots
- Clade: Asterids
- Order: Asterales
- Family: Asteraceae
- Tribe: Heliantheae
- Genus: Lagascea
- Species: L. mollis

Binomial name
- Lagascea mollis Cav.

Synonyms
- Nocca mollis (Cav.) Jacq.; Lagascea campestris Gardner; Lagascea kunthiana Gardner; Lagascea parvifolia Klatt

= Lagascea mollis =

Species of plant

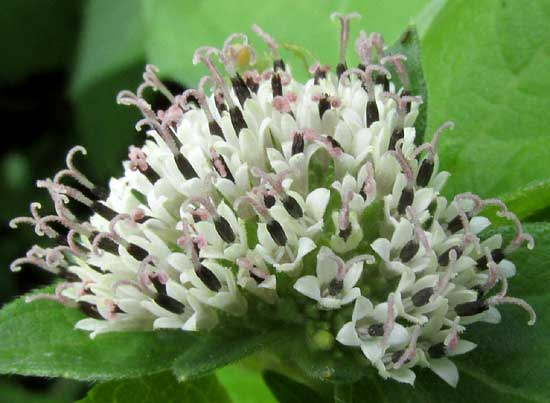
Inflorescence

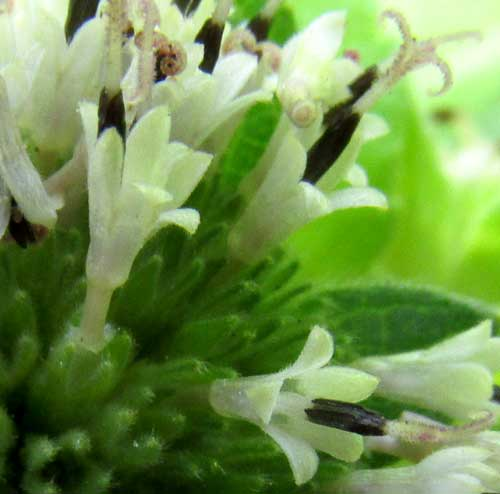
Closely packed, one-flowered floral heads

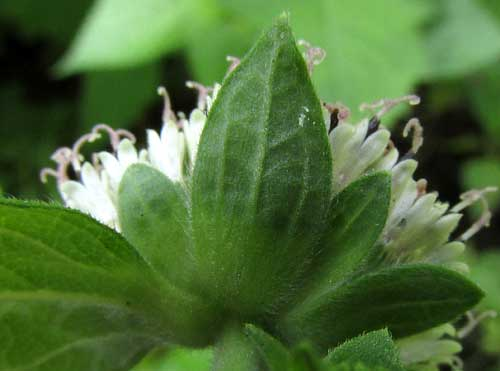
Leaf-like bracts below the inflorescence

Lagascea mollis, or silkleaf, is a species of herbaceous plant or subshrub native to the American tropics, but invasive elsewhere. It belongs to the family Asteraceae.

== Description ==
Here are field marks distinguishing silkleaf from similar flowering plants:

- Stems may creep, straggle or stand upright to 1 m (3 ft 3 in) high and sometimes develop roots on the lower nodes where leaves attach.
- Leaves covered with short hairs, or trichomes, arise in pairs opposite one another, on petioles up to 27 mm (1 in) long. Blades are up to about 5.8 cm (2 1/2 in) long and around half as broad, and are widest below their middles; they gradually diminish to sharp tips. Blade margins are saw-toothed to nearly smooth, with 3-5 nerves arising at blade bases.
- Unlike the vast majority of Aster Family species, inflorescences appearing alone at stem tips consist of up 25 one-flowered floral heads, or capitula, so closely grouped that the inflorescence itself suggests one big floral head.
- The reduced flowers, or florets are "disc florets" with cylindrical corollas. Corollas are white to reddish purple with the tube part about 0.6 mm (1/32 in) long and the expanded part about 3 mm (1/8 in) in length, with lobes reaching 1 mm (1/16 in) long.
- One-seeded, cypsela-type fruits are hairy, brown to black, up to 3 mm (1/8 in) long, each topped by a minute "crown," the pappus. Each cypsela usually is surrounded by fused involucral bracts, or phyllaries.

== Distribution ==
Lagascea mollis is occurs nearly throughout tropical America, from Mexico, the Caribbean and Central America south to Argentina, though it seems absent or unreported from the Amazon region. Otherwise, it is nearly a pantropical weed, once even collected in Florida in the USA, probably as an ephemeral population introduced in ship ballast.

== Habitat ==
In Mexico silkleaf occurs alongside roads, abandoned areas and cultivated fields.

== Interactions with humans ==
=== In traditional medicine ===
In India, a paste made of the whole silkleaf plant mixed with camphor and mustard oil is applied on the chest and throat to treat colds, coughs and nasal congestion. A paste of the inflorescence mixed with black pepper and cow milk is given to cure dysentery.

=== As forage ===
In Mexico's Yucatan Peninsula the Mayan people people regard silkleaf as forage for livestock.

=== As a weed ===
In Mexico, silkleaf is considered a weed in fields of corn (maize), soybeans, rice, squash and sugarcane. Also in Mexico, a study in weed control in fields of giant star grass, Cynodon plectostachyus, much grown as livestock forage, found that in a field plot of 1 hectare (2.5 acres) there were 16,590 silkleaf plants.

=== As a potential herbicide ===
A phytochemical study of silkleaf found that compounds from the plant produced potent herbicidal activity on the rampant weed Johnson Grass. Another study found allelopathic effects on cellular division and the first part of a seedling to emerge from the seed, the radicle, of cultivated rice plants.

== Taxonomy ==
In 1803 when Antonio José Cavanilles formally named and described Lagasca mollis, he remarked that his type specimen was from plants grown in the garden, from seeds sent from Havana.

=== Etymology ===
The genus name Lagascea honors Mariano Lagasca y Segura, botanist at the Real Jardín Botánico de Madrid.

The species name mollis is from the Latin mollis meaning "soft," possibly referring to silkleaf's silky-feeling leaves.
