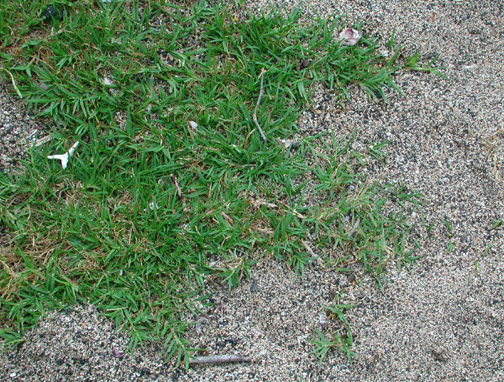
- Cynodon dactylon

Scientific classification
- Kingdom: Plantae
- Clade: Embryophytes
- Clade: Tracheophytes
- Clade: Spermatophytes
- Clade: Angiosperms
- Clade: Monocots
- Clade: Commelinids
- Order: Poales
- Family: Poaceae
- Subfamily: Chloridoideae
- Tribe: Cynodonteae
- Subtribe: Eleusininae
- Genus: Cynodon; Rich. in Pers. 1805, not Brid. 1819 (a moss in family Ditrichaceae)

Type species
- Cynodon dactylon (L.) Pers.

Synonyms
- Brachyachne (Benth.) Stapf; Capriola Adans.; Dactilon Vill.; Dactylon Roem. & Schult., pro syn.; Dactylus Asch., not validly publ.; Fibichia Koeler

= Cynodon =

Bermuda grass

Genus of flowering plants in the grass family

Cynodon, from Ancient Greek κύων (kúōn), meaning "dog", and ὀδούς (odoús), meaning "tooth", is a genus of plants in the grass family. It is native to warm temperate to tropical regions of the Old World, as well as being cultivated and naturalized in the New World and on many oceanic islands.

== Taxonomy ==
The genus name comes from Greek words meaning "dog-tooth". The genus as a whole as well as its species are commonly known as Bermuda grass or dog's tooth grass.

Species

- Cynodon ambiguus (Ohwi) P.M.Peterson
- Cynodon barberi Rang. & Tadul. – India, Sri Lanka
- Cynodon convergens F.Muell.
- Cynodon coursii A.Camus – Madagascar
- Cynodon dactylon (L.) Pers. – Old World; introduced in New World and on various islands
- Cynodon incompletus Nees – southern Africa; introduced in Australia, Argentina
- Cynodon × magennisii Hurcombe – Limpopo, Gauteng, Mpumalanga; introduced in Texas, Alabama
- Cynodon nlemfuensis Vanderyst – Africa from Ethiopia to Zimbabwe; introduced in South Africa, West Africa, Saudi Arabia, Philippines, Texas, Florida, Mesoamerica, northern South America, various islands
- Cynodon plectostachyus (K.Schum.) Pilg. – Chad, East Africa; introduced in Madagascar, Bangladesh, Mexico, West Indies, Paraguay, northeastern Argentina, Texas, California
- Cynodon prostratus (C.A.Gardner & C.E.Hubb.) P.M.Peterson
- Cynodon radiatus Roth – China, Indian Subcontinent, Southeast Asia, Madagascar; introduced in Australia, New Guinea
- Cynodon simonii P.M.Peterson
- Cynodon tenellus R.Br.
- Cynodon transvaalensis Burtt Davy – South Africa, Lesotho; introduced in other parts of Africa plus in scattered locales in Iran, Australia, and the Americas

Formerly included

Several species now considered better suited to other genera, namely Arundo, Bouteloua, Chloris, Cortaderia, Ctenium, Digitaria, Diplachne, Eleusine, Enteropogon, Eragrostis, Eustachys, Gynerium, Leptochloa, Molinia, Muhlenbergia, Phragmites, Poa, Spartina, Tridens, and Trigonochloa.

- Cynodon abyssinicus – Eragrostis tef
- Cynodon altior – Brachyachne tenella
- Cynodon amabilis – Eragrostis amabilis
- Cynodon americanus – Bouteloua americana
- Cynodon brizoides – Eragrostis capensis
- Cynodon caeruleus – Molinia caerulea
- Cynodon carolinianus – Tridens flavus
- Cynodon ciliaris – Brachyachne ciliaris
- Cynodon convergens – Brachyachne convergens
- Cynodon coracanus – Eleusine coracana
- Cynodon cruciatus – Chloris cruciata
- Cynodon curtipendulus – Bouteloua curtipendula
- Cynodon cynosuroides – Spartina cynosuroides
- Cynodon diffusus – Muhlenbergia schreberi
- Cynodon domingensis – Leptochloa virgata
- Cynodon donax – Arundo donax
- Cynodon elongatus – Enteropogon dolichostachyus
- Cynodon fascicularis – Diplachne fusca subsp. fascicularis
- Cynodon filiformis – Leptochloa panicea
- Cynodon gracilis – Trigonochloa uniflora
- Cynodon gynerium – Gynerium sagittatum
- Cynodon indicus – Eleusine indica
- Cynodon junceus – Bouteloua juncea
- Cynodon melicoides – Bouteloua curtipendula
- Cynodon monostachyus – Ctenium aromaticum
- Cynodon neesii – Leptochloa neesii
- Cynodon petitii – Phragmites australis subsp. isiacus
- Cynodon phragmites – Phragmites australis
- Cynodon pilosissimus – Cortaderia pilosa
- Cynodon pilosus – Digitaria stricta
- Cynodon polystachyus – Leptochloa neesii
- Cynodon praecox – Digitaria sanguinalis
- Cynodon procumbens – Chondrosum simplex
- Cynodon pungens – Spartina maritima
- Cynodon setigerus – Digitaria setigera
- Cynodon sudeticus – Poa chaixii
- Cynodon tenellus – Brachyachne tenella
- Cynodon tener – Eustachys tenera
- Cynodon ternatus – Digitaria ternata
- Cynodon virgatus Willd. – Leptochloa chinensis
- Cynodon virgatus (L.) Raspail – Leptochloa virgata
- Cynodon virgatus Nees ex Steud. – Leptochloa neesii

== Cultivation and uses ==
Some species, most commonly C. dactylon, are grown as lawn grasses in warm temperate regions, such as the Sunbelt area of the United States where they are valued for their drought tolerance compared to most other lawn grasses. Propagation is by rhizomes, stolons, or seeds. In some cases it is considered to be a weed; it spreads through lawns and flower beds, where it can be difficult to kill with herbicides without damaging other grasses or plants. It is difficult to pull out because the rhizomes and stolons break readily, and then re-grow.

It is also noted for its common use on the surface of greens on golf courses, as well as football and baseball playing fields.

Recent news reports claim that a Bermuda-derived F_{1} hybrid called Tifton 85 suddenly started producing cyanide and killed a cattle herd in Texas, US.
