= The Grasshopper Company =

American manufacturer of lawn mowers

Grasshopper Mowers
- Type: Private
- Industry: Turf Maintenance Equipment
- Founded: 1969
- Headquarters: Moundridge, Kansas 38.192462°N 97.518157°W
- Products: Commercial & Residential Zero-Turn Mowers, Snow Removal Equipment, Grounds Care Equipment
- Number of employees: 300
- Website: grasshoppermower.com

Grasshopper Mowers is a turf equipment brand headquartered in Moundridge, Kansas, United States. The company manufactures commercial & residential mowers, snow removal equipment, and ground care equipment under parent company Moridge Manufacturing.

== History ==
Moridge Manufacturing was founded in 1958 by Elbert and Marvel Guyer. Grasshopper has been a family-owned brand manufactured by Moridge Manufacturing, Inc. since 1969 and has expanded to include a 350,000-square-foot (33,000 m^{2}) manufacturing facility in Moundridge. The company developed their products to serve the needs of government entities, lawn care professionals and land owners.

Grasshopper was the first manufacturer to offer dual swing-out levers for their zero-turn mowers (1973) and the first to offer a diesel-powered zero-turn mower (1983).

Grasshopper introduced the PowerFold Electric Deck Lift in 2004, to allow the operator to easily lift and rotate the mowing deck nearly 90 degrees for maintenance and storage access.

== Products ==
Grasshopper offers a range of commercial-grade turf equipment. Their product line includes zero-turn FrontMount mowers and compatible implements to use the power unit year-round. Some customers report reliable equipment with reliable performance, ease of operation, and comfort. The modular design allows for customization with various cutting decks, mulching, and bagging options. Used by professionals, homeowners and government institutions Grasshopper provides solutions for maintaining lawns with minimal effort and maximum results.

== Awards & Recognition ==
Grasshopper was presented with a 2012 Pollution Prevention (P2) award from the Kansas Department of Health and Environment in August 2012. The company was selected for its investments in new laser cutting technology, software and parts scanning equipment that reduced consumption of raw steel at its manufacturing facility in Moundridge.

Grasshopper was hosted at the White House on July 17, 2017 by President Trump and Vice President Pence to promote American manufacturing during Made In America Product Showcase.

The North American Equipment Dealer's Association awarded Grasshopper the Dealer's Choice Aware for Outdoor Power Equipment Manufacturers. The Dealer's Choice Award is given to the top-rated manufacturer in each of NAEDA's four manufacturer categories. Grasshopper scored highest among all other Outdoor Power Equipment (OPE) manufacturers in 7 of 12 categories and finished in the top 3 in the other 5 categories. This was the company's fourth top Dealer's Choice aware in the last 10 years.

In late 2024, the OutStander SO26 Stand-On was honored in the Exterior Buildings and Grounds category by readers of Facility Maintenance Decisions and Facility Cleaning Decisions magazines. Readers determined products that contribute to the efficient and profitable operations, maintenance and cleaning of institutional and commercial buildings in the United States.

== See also ==
- Lawns in the United States
