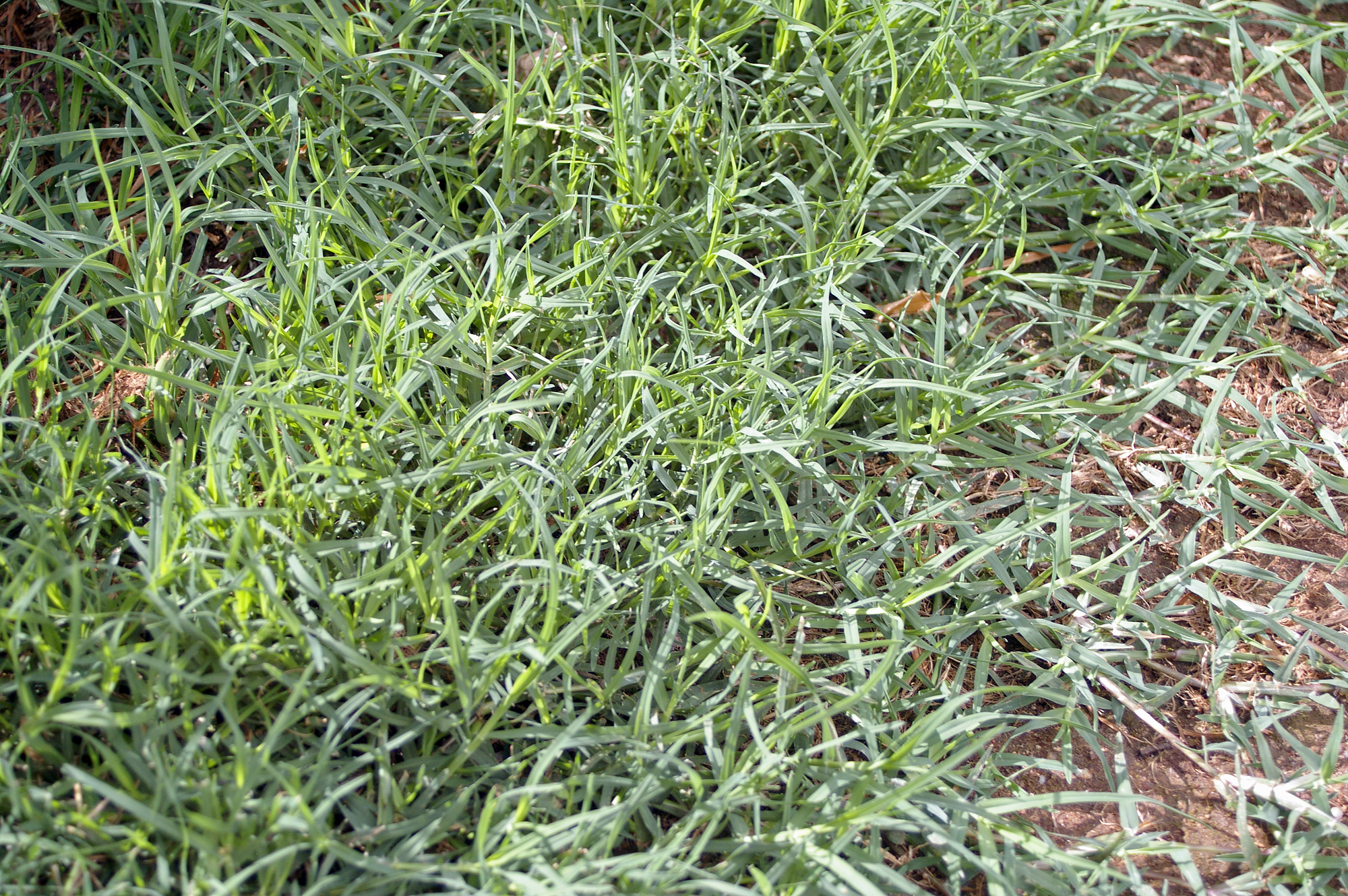

Scientific classification
- Kingdom: Plantae
- Clade: Tracheophytes
- Clade: Angiosperms
- Clade: Monocots
- Clade: Commelinids
- Order: Poales
- Family: Poaceae
- Subfamily: Chloridoideae
- Genus: Cynodon
- Species: C. dactylon

Binomial name
- Cynodon dactylon (L.) Pers.

Synonyms
- List: Agrostis bermudiana Tussac. ex Kunth nom. inval.; Agrostis filiformis J.Koenig ex Kunth nom. inval.; Agrostis linearis Retz.; Agrostis stellata Willd.; Capriola dactylon (L.) Kuntze; Capriola dactylon (L.) Hitchc.; Chloris cynodon Trin. nom. illeg.; Chloris maritima Trin.; Chloris paytensis Steud.; Cynodon affinis Caro & E.A.Sánchez; Cynodon aristiglumis Caro & E.A.Sánchez; Cynodon aristulatus Caro & E.A.Sánchez; Cynodon barberi f. longifolia Join; Cynodon decipiens Caro & E.A.Sánchez; Cynodon distichloides Caro & E.A.Sánchez; Cynodon erectus J.Presl; Cynodon glabratus Steud.; Cynodon grandispiculus Caro & E.A.Sánchez nom. inval.; Cynodon hirsutissimus (Litard. & Maire) Caro & E.A.Sánchez; Cynodon iraquensis Caro; Cynodon laeviglumis Caro & E.A.Sánchez; Cynodon linearis Willd.; Cynodon maritimus Kunth; Cynodon mucronatus Caro & E.A.Sánchez; Cynodon nitidus Caro & E.A.Sánchez; Cynodon occidentalis Willd. ex Steud. nom. inval.; Cynodon pascuus Nees; Cynodon pedicellatus Caro; Cynodon polevansii Stent; Cynodon portoricensis Willd. ex Steud. nom. inval.; Cynodon repens Dulac nom. illeg.; Cynodon sarmentosus Gray nom. illeg.; Cynodon scabrifolius Caro; Cynodon stellatus Willd.; Cynodon tenuis Trin.; Cynodon umbellatus (Lam.) Caro; Cynosurus dactylon (L.) Pers.; Cynosurus uniflorus Walter; Dactilon officinale Vill. nom. illeg.; Dactylus officinalis Asch. nom. inval.; Digitaria ambigua (Lapeyr. ex DC.) Mérat; Digitaria dactylon (L.) Scop.; Digitaria glumaepatula (Steud.) Miq.; Digitaria glumipatula (Steud.) Miq.; Digitaria linearis (L.) Pers.; Digitaria linearis (Retz.) Spreng.; Digitaria littoralis Salisb. nom. illeg.; Digitaria maritima (Kunth) Spreng.; Digitaria stolonifera Schrad. nom. illeg.; Fibichia dactylon (L.) Beck; Fibichia umbellata Koeler nom. illeg.; Milium dactylon (L.) Moench; Panicum ambiguum (DC.) Le Turq.; Panicum dactylon L.; Panicum glumipatulum Steud.; Panicum lineare L.; Paspalum ambiguum DC.; Paspalum dactylon (L.) Lam.; Paspalum umbellatum Lam.; Phleum dactylon (L.) Georgi; Syntherisma linearis (L.) Nash; Vilfa linearis (Retz.) P.Beauv.; Vilfa stellata (Willd.) P.Beauv.

= Cynodon dactylon =

Species of grass

Cynodon dactylon, commonly known as Bermuda grass or as couch grass in Australia and New Zealand, is a warm season grass found worldwide in warm and tropical climates. It is native to Europe, Africa, Australia, and much of Asia and has been introduced to the Americas.

Despite its common name, C. dactylon is not native to Bermuda but is an abundant invasive species there. In Bermuda, it has been known as crabgrass, also a name for Digitaria sanguinalis.

Interspecific hybrids occur naturally through cross-pollination, but cultivars are also developed by selecting individual plants with desirable traits from seeded or vegetatively propagated stands. These cultivars are typically triploids with three sets of chromosomes.

== Description ==
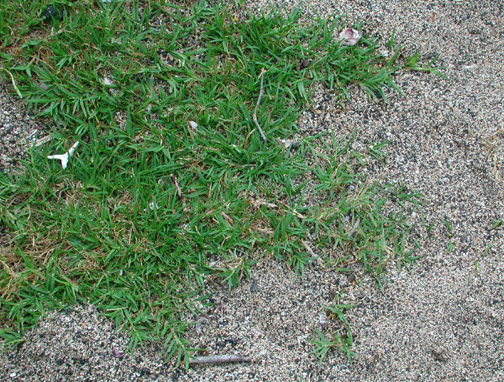
Growing in Kaloko-Honokohau National Historical Park on the Island of Hawaiʻi

The blades are grey-green in color and short, usually 2–15 cm (0.79–5.91 in) long with rough edges. The erect stems can grow 1–30 cm (0.39–11.81 in) tall. The stems are slightly flattened, often white or green, and occasionally tinged purple in colour.

The seed heads are produced in a cluster of two to six spikes together at the top of the stem, each spike 2–5 cm (0.79–1.97 in) long.

Cynodon dactylon has a deep root system. When grown in penetrable soil under drought conditions, its roots can grow to over 2 metres (6.6 ft) deep, though most of the root mass is less than 60 centimetres (24 in) under the surface. The grass creeps along the ground with its stolons and roots wherever a node touches the ground, forming a dense mat. C. dactylon reproduces through seeds, stolons, and rhizomes.

The grass starts actively growing at temperatures above 15 °C (59 °F) with ideal growth between 24 and 37 °C (75 and 99 °F); in winter or in the dry season, the grass becomes dormant and turns light brown. Optimal development also occurs in areas of full sun exposure, while dense shade, especially near tree bases, generally suppresses it.

== Cultivation ==
Cynodon dactylon is widely cultivated in warm climates all over the world between about 30° S and 30° N latitude, and in regions that receive between 625 and 1,750 mm (24.6 and 68.9 in) of rainfall a year, or less, if irrigation is available. For example, in the United States, it is grown mostly in the southern half of the country.

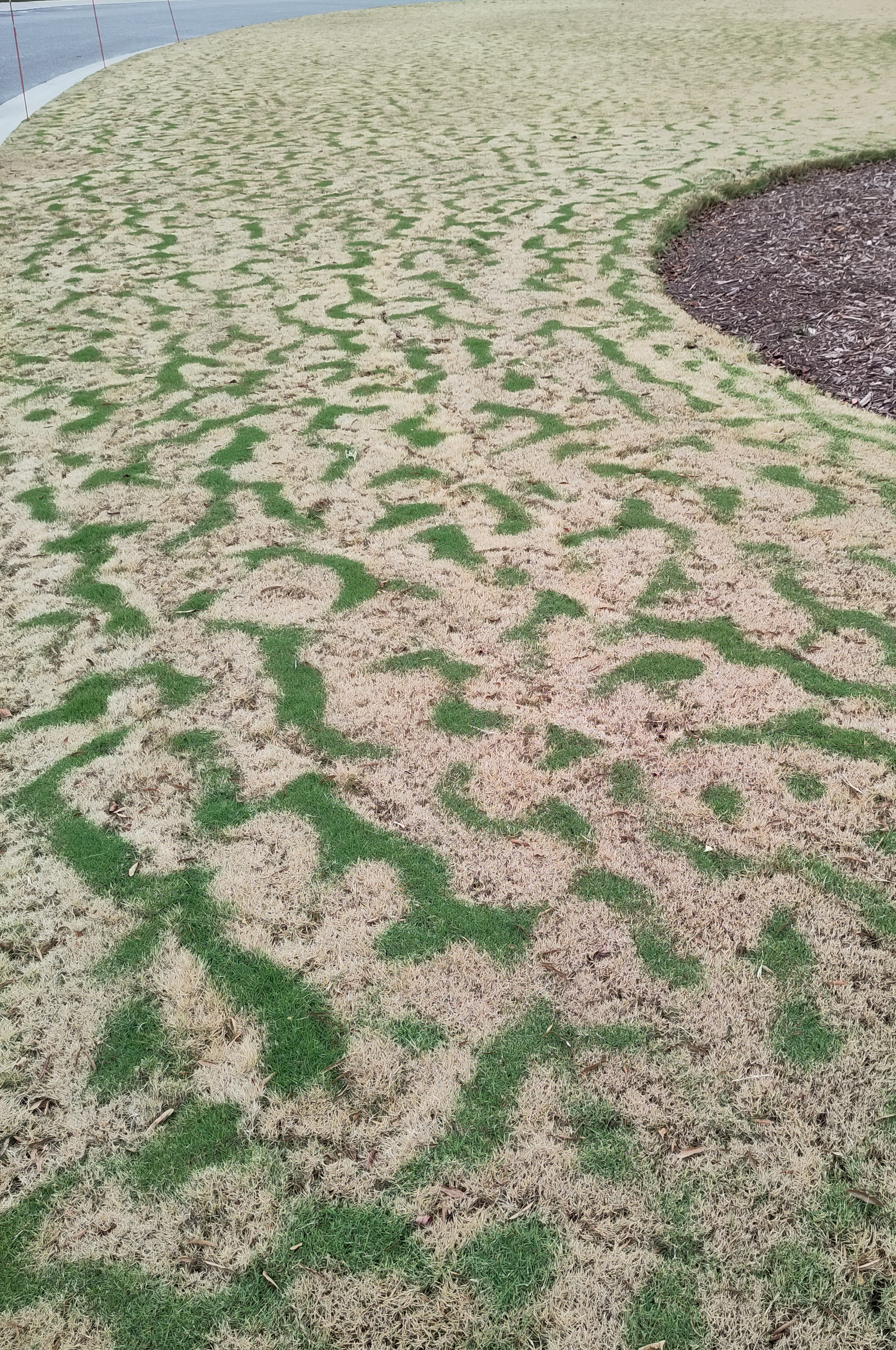
Cultivated Bermuda grass with "tiger striping", caused by Rayleigh–Bénard convection during the first frosts of the fall. The frost regions turn brown after several days, and the frost-free regions remain green. The spatial scale of the pattern is ~20 cm.

=== Cultivars ===
Hundreds of cultivars have been created specifically for environmental tolerance and stakeholder requirements. New cultivars are released annually.

== Uses ==
=== Religious ===
In Hinduism, it is considered important in the worship of Lord Ganesha. A unique festival called Durga Ashtami, dedicated to this grass, is celebrated on the eighth day of the Navratri festival.

It is known as arugampull in Tamil, garikēhullu in Kannada and karuka in Malayalam, and is part of the Dashapushpam (ten sacred flowers) in Kerala.

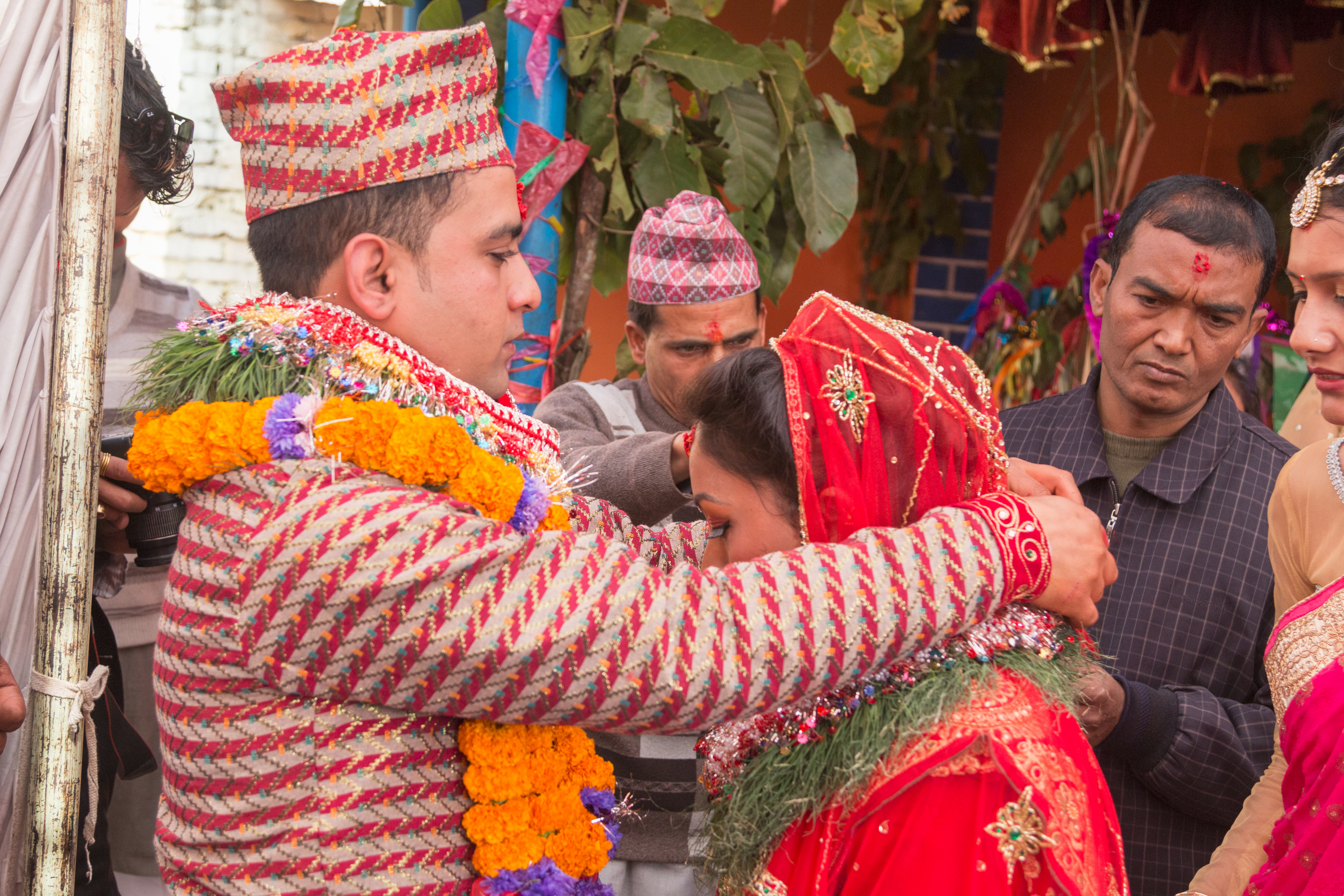
A groom tying a dubo garland around the bride's neck in a Nepalese Hindu wedding

In Nepal, the grass is known as dubo. For Nepalese Hindus, it symbolizes long life and is essential for the Naga Panchami and Gaura festivals. In a Nepalese Hindu wedding, a garland made of this grass is worn by the bride and groom.

=== Folk medicine ===
In Mexico, the plant may have been used during the 20th century as a decoction intended to treat various illnesses.

=== Other ===
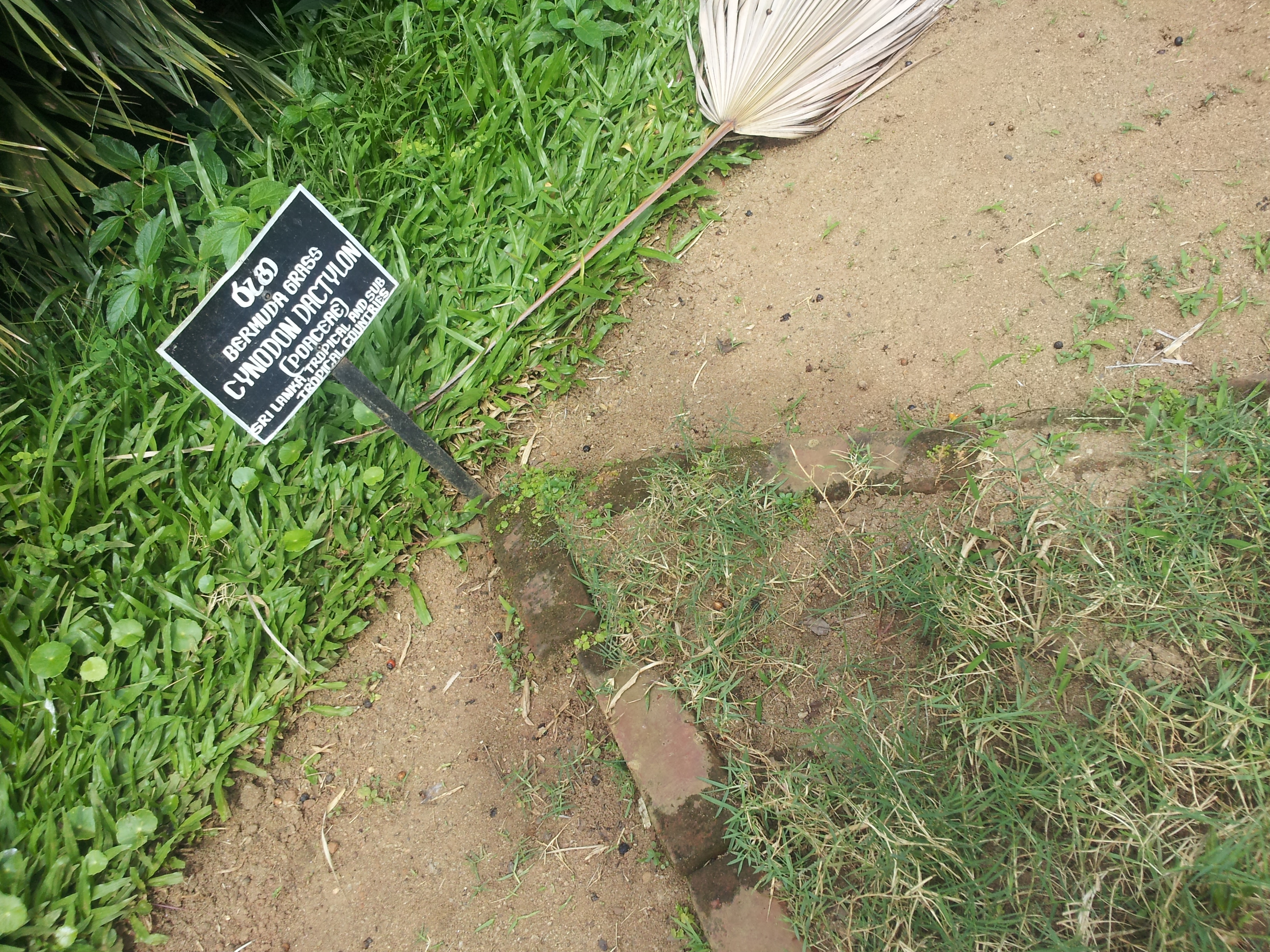
Cynodon dactylon (foreground, the background grass is a separate species) at Peradeniya Royal Botanical Garden

Bermuda grass is fast-growing and tough, making it a popular choice for sports fields because it will recover quickly when damaged. It is a highly desirable turfgrass in warm temperate climates, particularly in hot and dry regions where it will survive while other grass species cannot.

The combination of heat and drought tolerance makes Bermuda grass a frequent choice for golf courses in the southern and southeastern United States and South Africa. Bermuda grass is also commonly used for football and baseball fields. It has a relatively coarse-bladed form with numerous cultivars selected for different turf requirements.

Bermuda grass has been cultivated in saline soils in California's Central Valley, which are too salt-damaged to support agricultural crops; it was successfully irrigated with saline water and used to graze cattle.

== Ecology ==
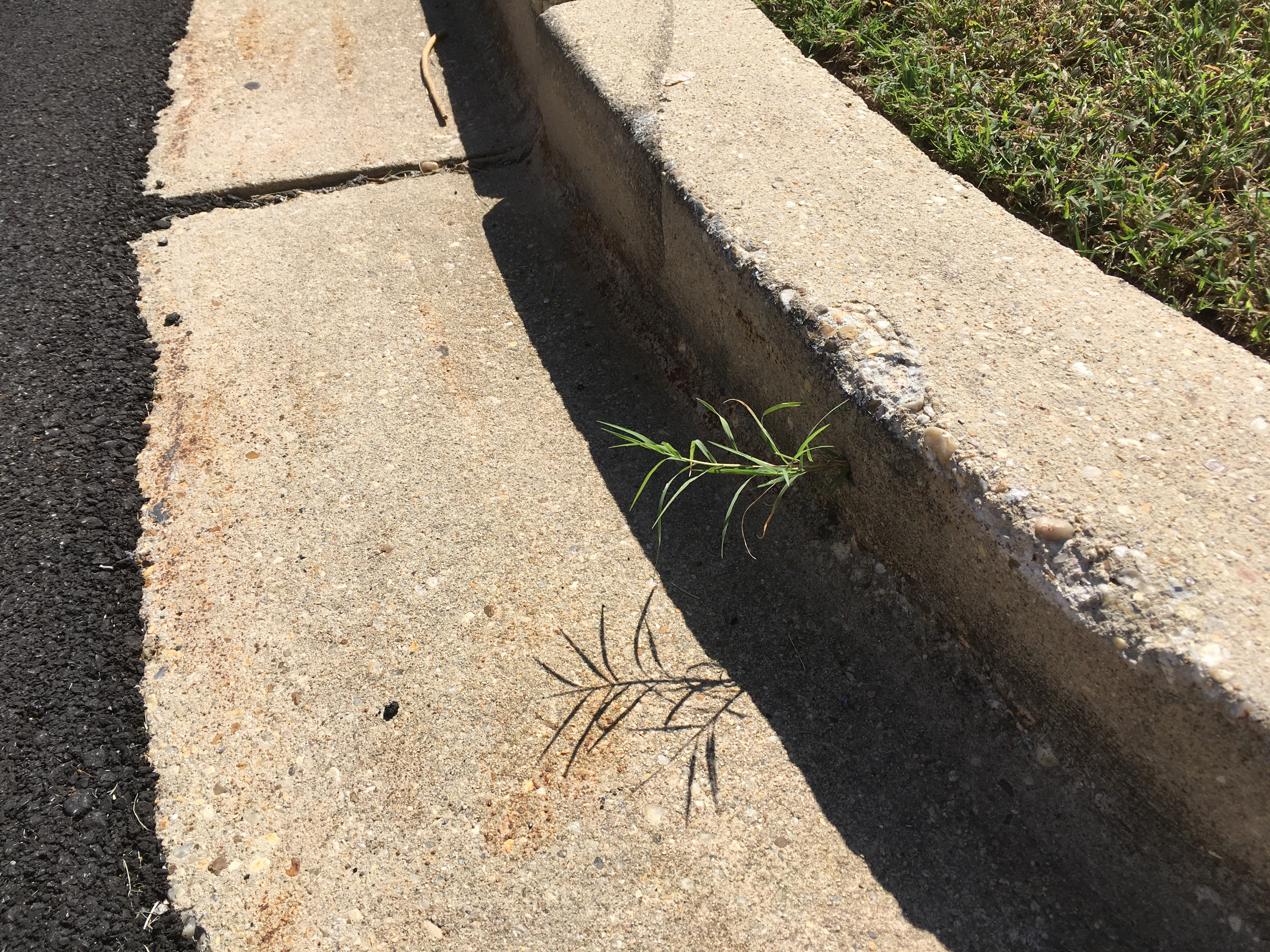
Cynodon dactylon growing out of a concrete curb

=== Invasive species ===
Bermuda grass can be a highly aggressive invasive species, crowding out most other grasses and invading other habitats, and has become a hard-to-eradicate weed in some areas. It can be controlled somewhat with triclopyr, mesotrione, fluazifop-p-butyl, and glyphosate.

This weedy nature leads some gardeners to give it the name of devil grass. Bermuda grass is incredibly difficult to control in flower beds, and most herbicides do not work. However, Ornamec, Ornamec 170, Turflon ester (tricyclopyr), and Imazapyr have shown some effectiveness. All of these items are difficult to find in retail stores, as they are primarily marketed to professional landscapers.

=== Toxicity ===
The hybrid variety Tifton 85, like some other grasses (e.g. sorghum), produces cyanide under certain conditions, and has been implicated in several livestock deaths.

=== Density of Cynodon ===
Cynodon dactylon is an aggressive grass that can be difficult to remove once established, so it is best suited for areas where a permanent, fast-growing ground cover is wanted. It can also regrow if planted again in fertile soil. Once established, it creates a durable, dense turf that can withstand heavy traffic.
