= Cynodon barberi =

Scientific classification
- Kingdom: Plantae
- Clade: Tracheophytes
- Clade: Angiosperms
- Clade: Monocots
- Clade: Commelinids
- Order: Poales
- Family: Poaceae
- Subfamily: Chloridoideae
- Genus: Cynodon
- Species: C. barberi

Binomial name
- Cynodon barberi Rang. & Tadul.

Species of plant

Cynodon barberi is a species of flowering plant in the grass family Poaceae, native to India and Sri Lanka. It was first described in 1916.
