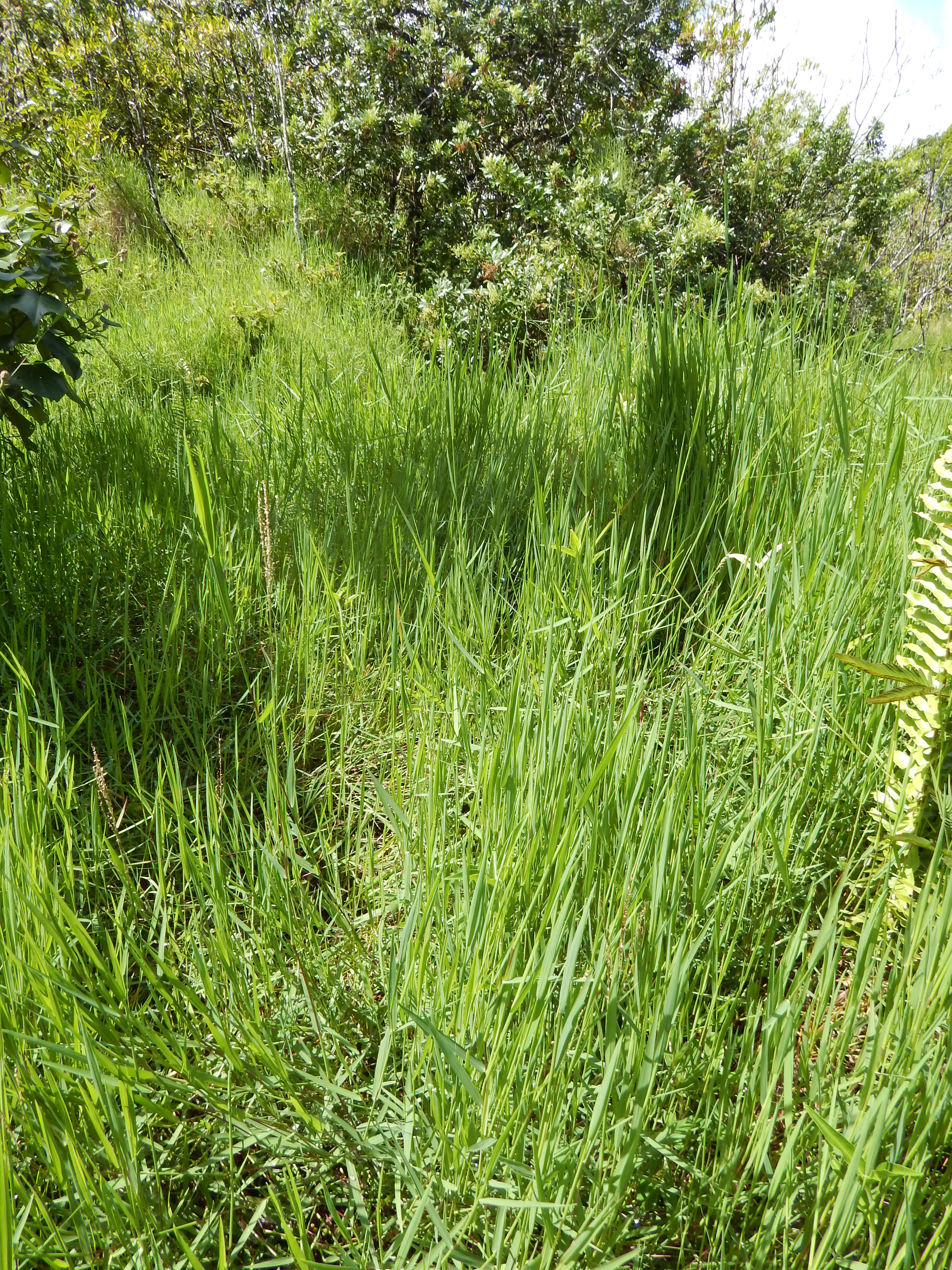
- In Maui, Hawaii

Scientific classification
- Kingdom: Plantae
- Clade: Embryophytes
- Clade: Tracheophytes
- Clade: Angiosperms
- Clade: Monocots
- Clade: Commelinids
- Order: Poales
- Family: Poaceae
- Subfamily: Panicoideae
- Genus: Digitaria
- Species: D. abyssinica

Binomial name
- Digitaria abyssinica (Hochst. ex A.Rich.) Stapf

Synonyms
- List: Digitaria effusa Veldkamp; Digitaria eichingeri Mez; Digitaria hackelii Stapf; Digitaria hentyi Veldkamp; Digitaria lemeeana A.Camus; Digitaria merkeri Mez; Digitaria mutica Rendle; Digitaria scalarum (Schweinf.) Chiov.; Digitaria somalensis Chiov.; Digitaria tangaensis Henrard; Digitaria vestita Fig. & De Not.; Panicum abyssinicum Hochst. ex A.Rich.; Panicum hackelii Pilg.; Panicum kafuroense K.Schum.; Panicum scalarum Schweinf.

= Digitaria abyssinica =

Species of flowering plant

Digitaria abyssinica, the East African couchgrass, is a species of flowering plant in the family Poaceae. It is native to Sub‑Saharan Africa (except West Africa), Madagascar, many of the Indian Ocean islands, the Arabian Peninsula, Sri Lanka, Peninsular Malaysia, Vietnam, New Guinea, and Queensland in Australia, and it has been introduced to scattered locations in Central America and northern South America, and to Saint Helena. Although it is a livestock forage, albeit a low‑quality one, it is generally considered a noxious weed.
