= Cyperus rigidifolius =

Scientific classification
- Kingdom: Plantae
- Clade: Tracheophytes
- Clade: Angiosperms
- Clade: Monocots
- Clade: Commelinids
- Order: Poales
- Family: Cyperaceae
- Genus: Cyperus
- Species: C. rigidifolius

Binomial name
- Cyperus rigidifolius Steud.

Species of plant from Africa and the Arabian Peninsula

Cyperus rigidifolius is a species of sedge that is native to Africa and the Arabian Peninsula.

The species was first formally described by the botanist Ernst Gottlieb von Steudel in 1842.

== See also ==
- List of Cyperus species
