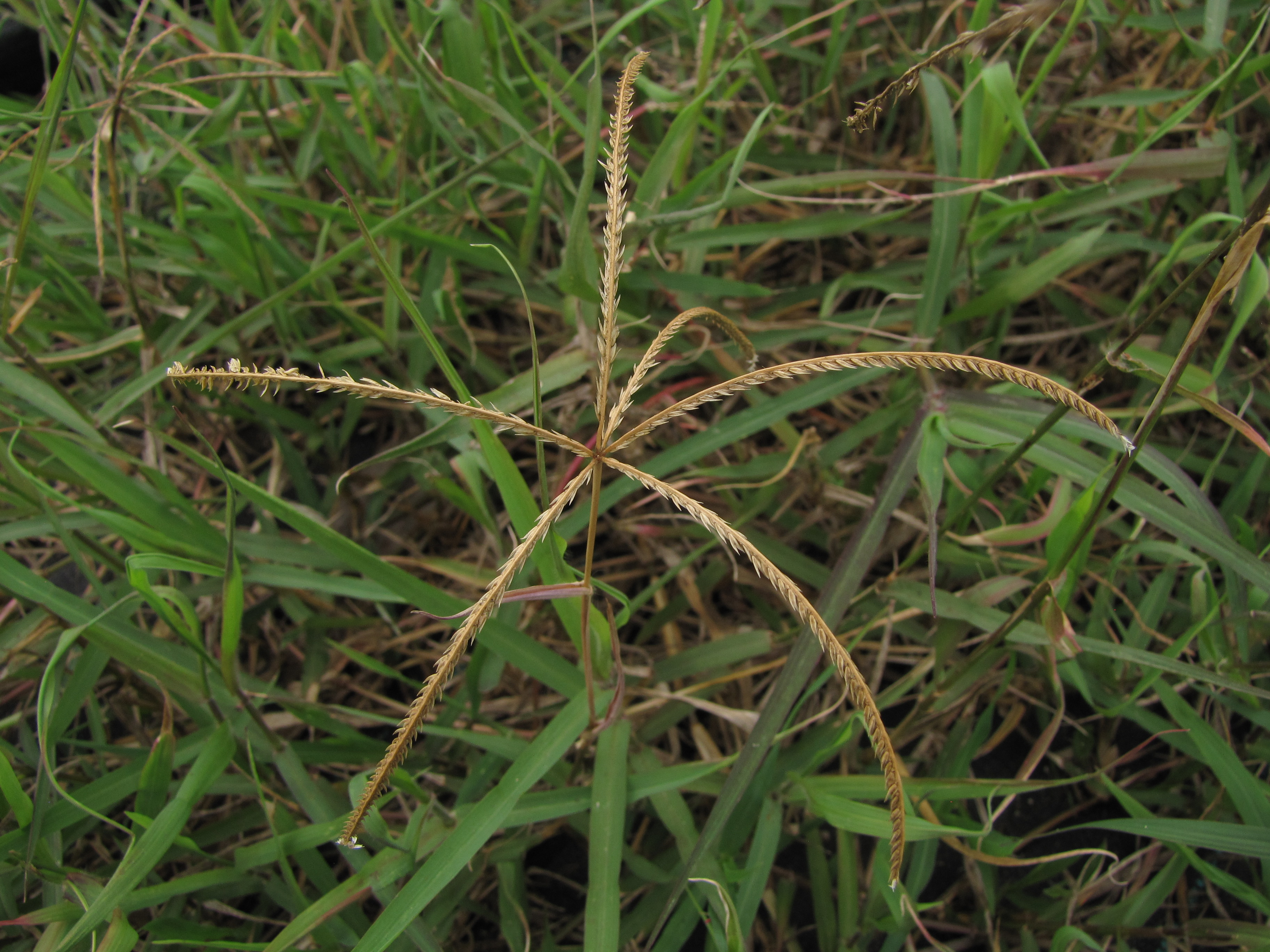
- Seedhead
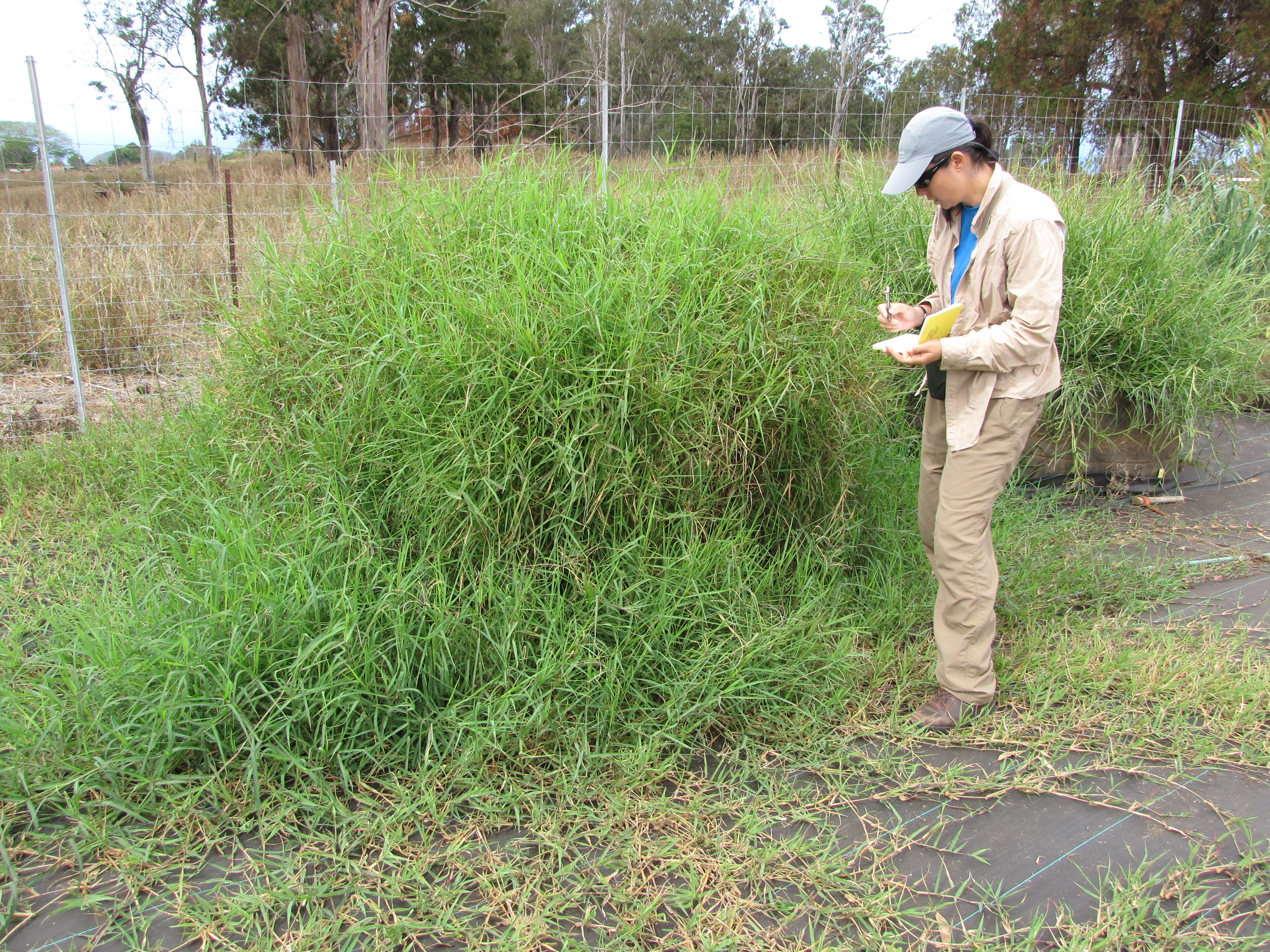
- With human for scale

Scientific classification
- Kingdom: Plantae
- Clade: Embryophytes
- Clade: Tracheophytes
- Clade: Spermatophytes
- Clade: Angiosperms
- Clade: Monocots
- Clade: Commelinids
- Order: Poales
- Family: Poaceae
- Subfamily: Chloridoideae
- Genus: Cynodon
- Species: C. nlemfuensis

Binomial name
- Cynodon nlemfuensis Vanderyst

Synonyms
- Cynodon lemfuensis Vanderyst; Cynodon parodii Caro & E.A.Sánchez

= Cynodon nlemfuensis =

Species of plant

Cynodon nlemfuensis, the African Bermuda-grass, is a species of grass, genus Cynodon, family Poaceae. It is native to Tropical Africa except West Africa, and widely introduced as a forage elsewhere; Hawaii, Texas, Florida, Mexico, Central America, the Caribbean, the Galápagos, South America, western and southern Africa, Saudi Arabia, Taiwan, the Philippines and Australia. It is stoloniferous, and not rhizomatous.

== Subtaxa ==
The following varieties are accepted:

- Cynodon nlemfuensis var. nlemfuensis
- Cynodon nlemfuensis var. robustus Clayton & J.R.Harlan
