= Lawns in the United States =

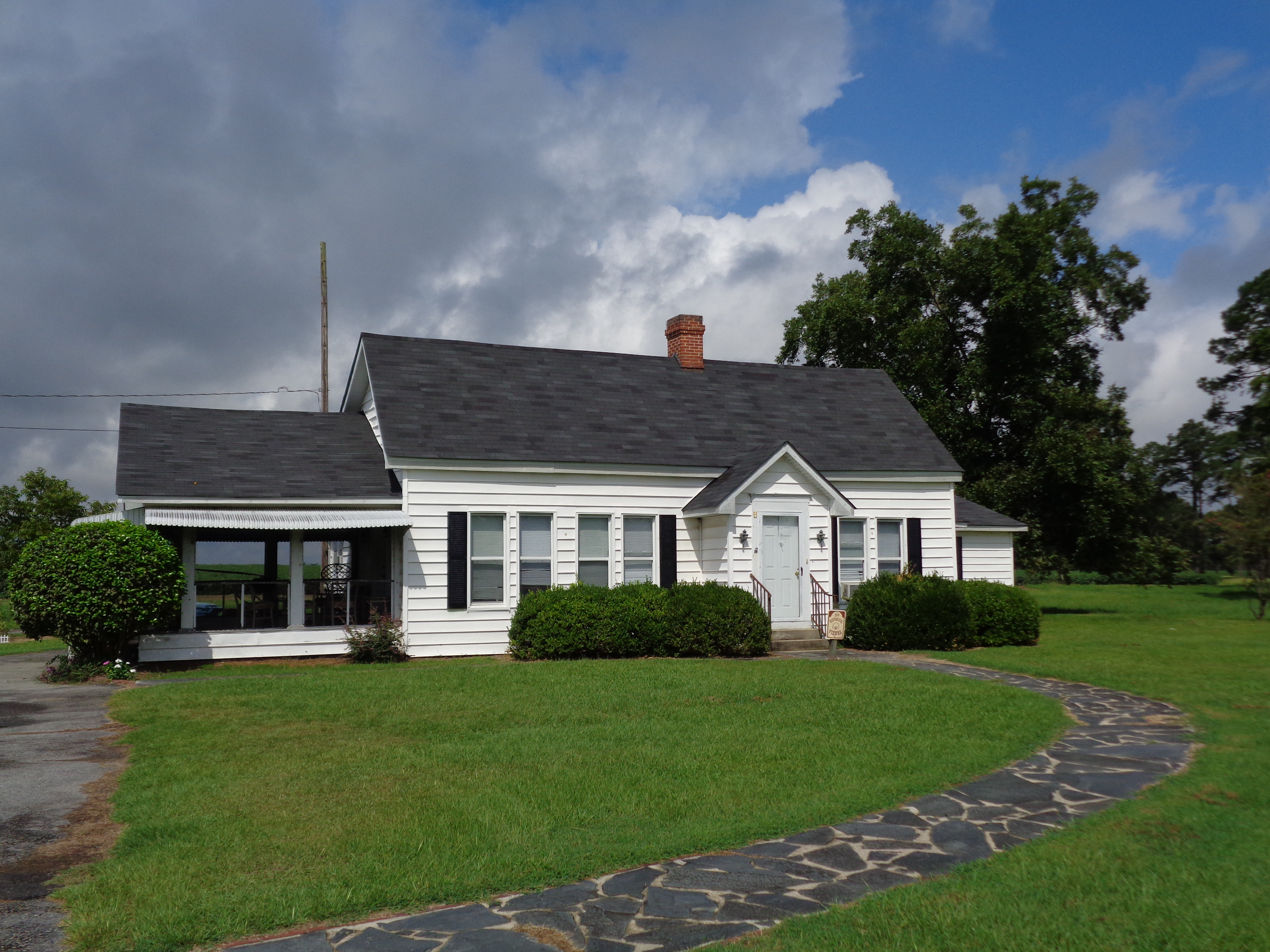
A typical front lawn in the United States.

Lawn grass zones of the U.S.

In a 2005 NASA-sponsored study, it was estimated that the area covered by lawns in the United States to be about 128,000 square kilometres (49,000 sq mi). In her book The Lawn: A History of an American Obsession (1994) Virginia Scott Jenkins traces the historic desire to kill weeds. She notes that the current rage for a chemically dependent lawn emerged after World War II and argues that "American front lawns are a symbol of man's control of, or superiority over, his environment."

According to the EPA in 2012, "of the 26 billion gallons of water consumed daily in the United States, approximately 7.8 billion gallons, or 30 percent, is devoted to outdoor uses. The majority of this is used for irrigation."

== Industry ==
Lawn care is a popular business in the United States; proper maintenance, construction and management of lawns of various kinds being the focus of much of the modern horticulture industry. Estimates of the amount spent on professional lawn care services vary, but a Harris Survey put the total at $28.9 billion in 2002 (approximately $1,200 per household using such services). In 2019, the total amount spent on lawn care had increased to approximately $36 billion a year.

Some companies and brands of lawnmowers in the US include:

- The Grasshopper Company
- Sensation Lawn Mowers, a commercial lawnmower brand

Beginning as early as 1861 and continuing through the present day, many US patents have been issued for lawn mowers or mowing machines.

== Pesticides ==
The idea of lawn landscaping is fairly new with the turfgrass species used in lawns coming to the Americas in the last century. The idea of using chemicals to control a lawn is even newer. Around the 1930s, the use of chemicals to maintain a lawn was advised against. The most common way to control a yard during this time was to either hand pull the weeds or keep chickens. Chemical use became popular in the post-WWII era and has grown significantly since then. In 1999 a study by the United States Geological Survey found that 99% of urban water streams contained pesticides. Surprisingly, pesticides are commonly used by people who understand the negative effects of the chemicals, but they continue to use them due to the immense pressure they feel to maintain their lawn for their neighborhood’s sake. People often view their lawns as a social responsibility that speaks to their character which is why they are willing to use chemicals on their lawns despite the negative effects they may have. Many local governments also do not help this scenario because they have enacted “weed laws” that restrict grass growth over a certain number of inches. According to Robbins and Sharp, these laws are not necessarily the reason many people use chemicals, but they can be a barrier to those who wish to use alternative means of maintaining their lawns.

== See also ==
- History of the lawn
- Lawn, a town in Taylor County, Texas
