= Tifton 85 =

Hybrid strain of forage grass

Tifton 85 is a hybrid strain of Bermudagrass Cynodon dactylon, a forage perennial grass that originated in Africa and was brought to the United States as a pasture and hay crop for the humid Southern states. This variety was incorrectly reported by CBS News to be a genetically modified organism (GMO).

== History ==
In the 1950s, several superior hybrid varieties were developed via cross-breeding. Tifton 85 is a conventionally bred hybrid essentially created by conventional cross pollination methods.

Tifton 85 was developed at the USDA Agricultural Research Station at Tifton, Georgia, in 1992 by Dr. Glenn Burton. He developed Coastal Bermudagrass in 1943.

== Poisoned cattle ==
Tifton 85, like some other grasses (e.g. sorghum), produce cyanide salts under certain conditions and have been implicated in livestock deaths due to a condition commonly known as 'bloat', or 'Prussic Acid Poisoning'.

In June 2012, 15 head of cattle in Bastrop County, Texas (near Austin) died from consumption of Tifton 85. Before this event the cattle had been fed this grass for 15 years with no apparent toxicity issues.
