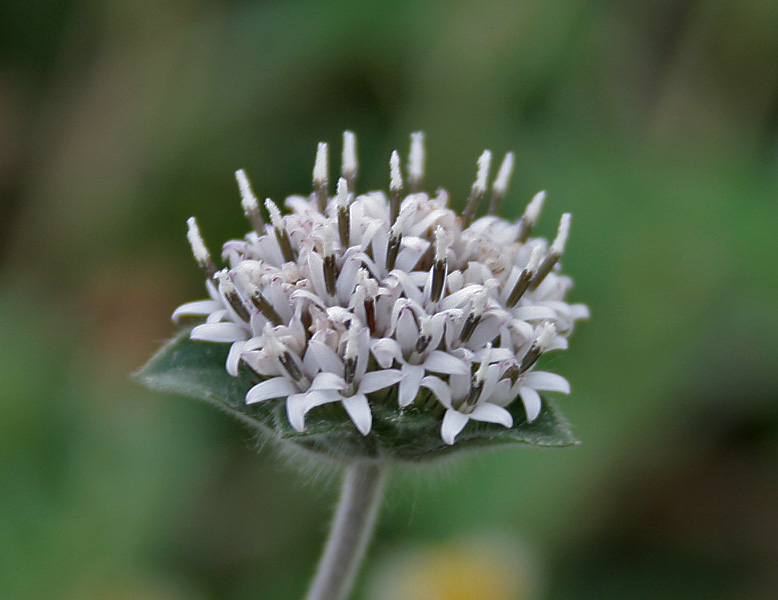
- Lagascea mollis

Scientific classification
- Kingdom: Plantae
- Clade: Tracheophytes
- Clade: Angiosperms
- Clade: Eudicots
- Clade: Asterids
- Order: Asterales
- Family: Asteraceae
- Subfamily: Asteroideae
- Tribe: Heliantheae
- Subtribe: Helianthinae
- Genus: Lagascea; Cav.

Type species
- Lagascea mollis Cav.

Synonyms
- Lagasca Cav., alternate spelling; Nocca Cav.; Calhounia A.Nelson

= Lagascea =

Genus of flowering plants

Lagascea is a genus of flowering plants in the family Asteraceae. It occurs primarily in Mexico, but some species extend into Central America and one reaches north into the western United States. One species, L. mollis, has been widely introduced to other localities around the tropics and subtropics.

Lagascea is a member of the same subtribe Helianthinae as the common sunflower, Helianthus annuus, but it looks different because it has heads that are reduced to have 1 (or 2) flowers, and are clustered into compound units that mimic heads and are sometimes called syncephalia. The relationships of Lagascea are not well established, but the published work from molecular phylogenetic studies places it as the sister genus to Tithonia. Two of the species are herbs, distinguished from each other by features of the heads, and the remaining species are shrubs and are distinguished primarily by vegetative features.

The genus is named after the Spanish botanist Mariano Lagasca (1776-1839).

Species

- Lagascea agustifolia D.C. - Guanajuato, Guerrero, Jalisco, México State, Morelos, Zacatecas, Nayarit, Sinaloa
- Lagascea aurea Stuessy - Michoacán
- Lagascea decipiens Hemsl. - Arizona (Pima + Santa Cruz Counties), Mexico (from Sonora to Oaxaca)
- Lagascea helianthifolia H.B.K. - Mexico + Central America from Tamaulipas to Nicaragua
- Lagascea heteropappus Hemsl. - Guerrero, México State, Michoacán
- Lagascea mollis Cav. - Mexico + Central America
- Lagascea palmeri (B. Rob.) B. Rob. - Michoacán, Colima
- Lagascea rigida (Cav.) Stuessy - Guerrero, México State, Morelos, Puebla, Distrito Federal
