= Cynodon plectostachyus =

Scientific classification
- Kingdom: Plantae
- Clade: Embryophytes
- Clade: Tracheophytes
- Clade: Spermatophytes
- Clade: Angiosperms
- Clade: Monocots
- Clade: Commelinids
- Order: Poales
- Family: Poaceae
- Subfamily: Chloridoideae
- Genus: Cynodon
- Species: C. plectostachyus

Binomial name
- Cynodon plectostachyus (K.Schum.) Pilg.

Synonyms
- Cynodon ruspolianus Chiov.; Leptochloa plectostachya K.Schum.

Species of plant

Cynodon plectostachyus, the giant star grass, is a species of grass (family Poaceae). It is native to Chad, Ethiopia, Uganda, Kenya, and Tanzania, and has been introduced as a livestock forage to California and Florida in the United States, Mexico, Honduras, Cuba, the Dominican Republic, Haiti, Paraguay, Argentina, Nepal, and Bangladesh. An aggressive competitor, it is now the most widespread grass in the New World Tropics. It is typically paired in a silvopastoral system with Leucaena leucocephala.
