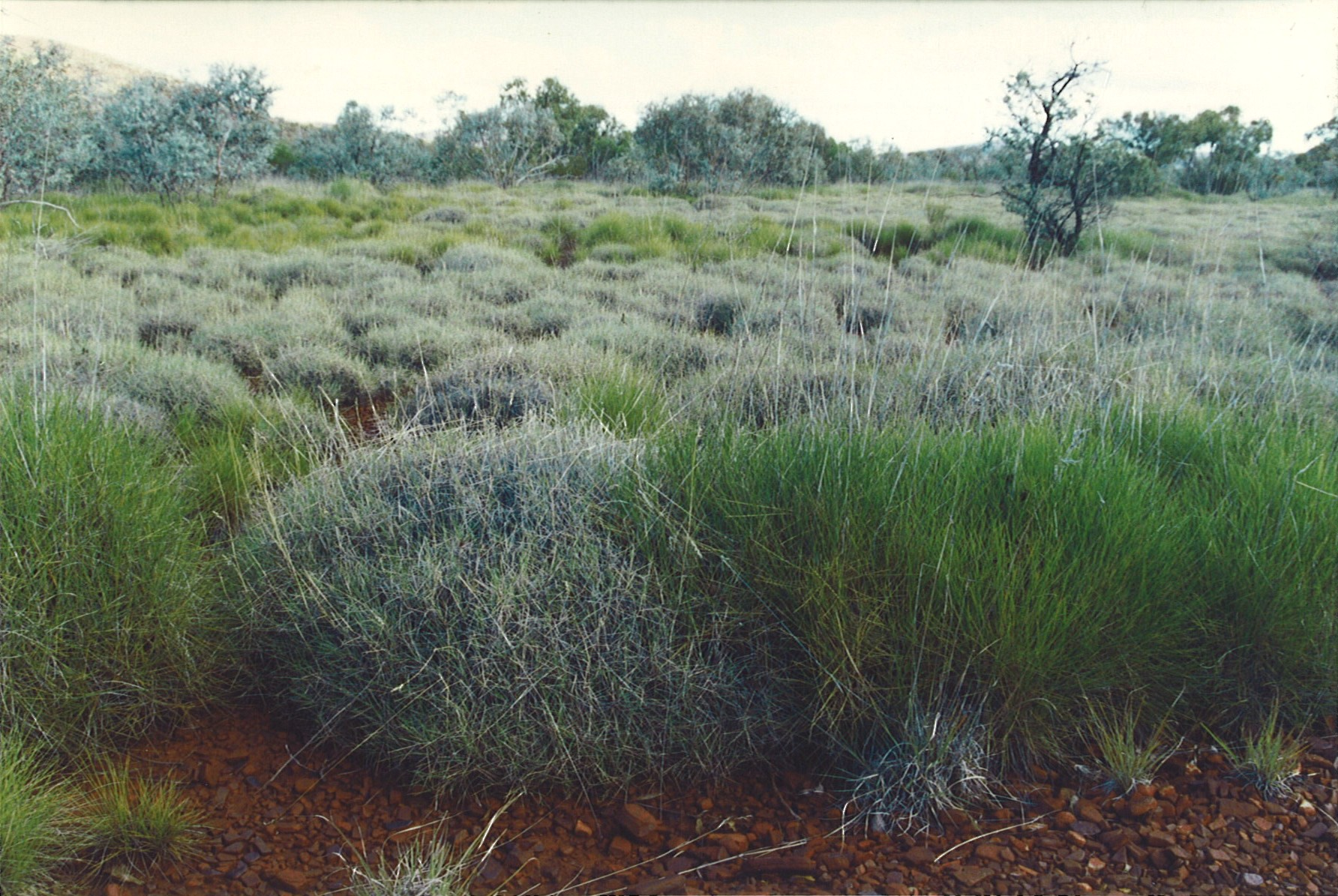
- Triodia pungens (green) and Triodia basedowii (blue-grey)

Scientific classification
- Kingdom: Plantae
- Clade: Tracheophytes
- Clade: Angiosperms
- Clade: Monocots
- Clade: Commelinids
- Order: Poales
- Family: Poaceae
- Subfamily: Chloridoideae
- Tribe: Cynodonteae
- Subtribe: Triodiinae
- Genus: Triodia; R.Br. (1810)

Synonyms
- Monodia S.W.L.Jacobs (1985), non Breton & Faurel (1970), fungal name.; Plectrachne Henrard (1929); Symplectrodia Lazarides (1985)

= Triodia (plant) =

Genus of plants

Triodia is a large genus of hummock grass endemic to Australia. The species of this genus are known by the common name spinifex, although they are not a part of the coastal genus Spinifex. Many soft-leaved Triodia species were formerly included in the genus Plectrachne. Triodia is known as tjanpi (grass) in central Australia, and have several traditional uses amongst the Aboriginal Australian peoples of the region.

A multiaccess key (SpiKey) is available as a free application for identifying the Triodia of the Pilbara (28 species and one hybrid).

== Description ==
Triodia species are perennial Australian hummock grasses that grow in arid regions. Their leaves (30–40 centimetres long) are subulate (awl-shaped, with a tapering point). The leaf tips, which are high in silica, can break off in the skin, leading to infections.

== Uses ==
Spinifex has had many traditional uses for Aboriginal Australians. Several species were (and are) used extensively as materials for basket weaving. The seeds were collected and ground to make seedcakes. Spinifex resin was an important adhesive used in spear-making. Burning spinifex produces a strong black smoke, and smoke signals made in this way were an effective means of communication with families and groups over substantial distances.

The species Triodia wiseana is used for building shelters; bunched together it is used for trapping fish against creek beds. It is called baru in the languages of the Yindjibarndi and Ngarluma people; the English term is hard spinifex.

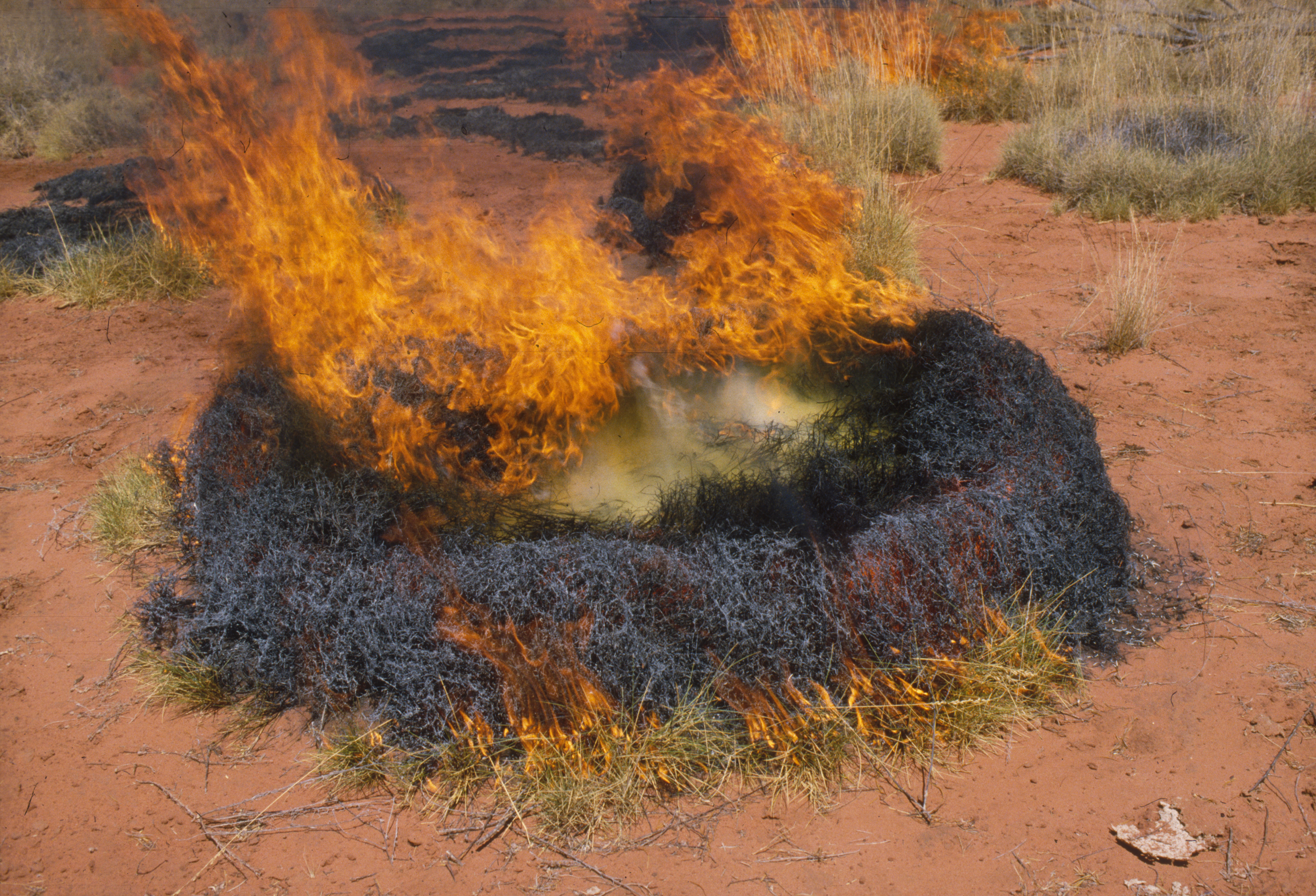
A controlled burn of Triodia (1989), CSIRO

Triodia nanofibres have been used to reinforce rubber and latex products. As of 2023, a Brisbane-based company has raised funds to develop medical gels from spinifex resin.

== Species ==
Species currently include:

- Triodia acutispicula Lazarides
- Triodia aeria Lazarides
- Triodia angusta (Burbidge, N.T)
- Triodia aristiglumis (Lazarides) Lazarides
- Triodia aurita Lazarides
- Triodia barbata R.L.Barrett & M.D.Barrett
- Triodia basedowii E.Pritz. – buck spinifex
- Triodia biflora Lazarides
- Triodia bitextura Lazarides
- Triodia brizoides (Burbidge, N.T)
- Triodia bromoides (F.Muell.) Lazarides
- Triodia bunglensis (S.W.L.Jacobs) Lazarides
- Triodia bunicola (S.W.L.Jacobs) Lazarides – southern porcupine grass
- Triodia burbidgeana S.W.L.Jacobs
- Triodia bynoei (C.E.Hubb.) Lazarides
- Triodia caelestialis G.Armstr.
- Triodia claytonii Lazarides
- Triodia compacta (Burbidge, N.T) S.W.L.Jacobs
- Triodia concinna (Burbidge, N.T)
- Triodia contorta (Lazarides) Lazarides
- Triodia cremmophila R.L.Barrett & M.D.Barrett
- Triodia cunninghamii Benth.
- Triodia danthonioides (F.Muell.) Lazarides
- Triodia desertorum (C.E.Hubb.) Lazarides
- Triodia dielsii (C.E.Hubb.) Lazarides
- Triodia epactia S.W.L.Jacobs
- Triodia fissura Barrett, Wells & Dixon
- Triodia fitzgeraldii C.A.Gardner ex N.T.Burb.
- Triodia helmsii (C.E.Hubb.) Lazarides
- Triodia hubbardii (Burbidge, N.T)
- Triodia inaequiloba (Burbidge, N.T)
- Triodia integra Lazarides
- Triodia intermedia Cheel – winged spinifex
- Triodia inutilis (Burbidge, N.T)
- Triodia irritans R.Br. – porcupine grass
- Triodia lanata J.M.Black
- Triodia lanigera Domin
- Triodia latzii Lazarides
- Triodia longiceps J.M.Black
- Triodia longiloba Lazarides
- Triodia longipalea Lazarides
- Triodia marginata (Burbidge, N.T)
- Triodia melvillei (C.E.Hubb.) Lazarides
- Triodia microstachya R.Br.
- Triodia mitchellii Benth. – buck spinifex
- Triodia molesta (Burbidge, N.T) – porcupine grass
- Triodia pascoeana B.K.Simon
- Triodia plectrachnoides (Burbidge, N.T)
- Triodia plurinervata (Burbidge, N.T)
- Triodia procera R.Br.
- Triodia prona Lazarides
- Triodia pungens R.Br. – gummy spinifex
- Triodia racemigera C.A.Gardner
- Triodia radonensis S.W.L.Jacobs
- Triodia rigidissima (Pilg.) Lazarides
- Triodia roscida (Burbidge, N.T)
- Triodia salina Lazarides
- Triodia scariosa (Burbidge, N.T) – porcupine grass
- Triodia schinzii (Henrard) Lazarides
- Triodia scintillans B.M.Anderson & M.D.Barrett 2017
- Triodia secunda (Burbidge, N.T)
- Triodia spicata (Burbidge, N.T)
- Triodia stenostachya Domin
- Triodia stipoides (S.W.L.Jacobs) Crisp & Mant
- Triodia tomentosa S.W.L.Jacobs
- Triodia triaristata Lazarides
- Triodia triticoides C.A.Gardner
- Triodia uniaristata (Lazarides) Lazarides
- Triodia vella Lazarides
- Triodia wiseana C.A.Gardner

=== Formerly included species ===
Numerous species once considered members of Triodia have been reassigned to other genera, including: Chascolytrum, Danthonia, Dasyochloa, Deschampsia, Diplachne, Disakisperma, Erioneuron, Gouinia, Graphephorum, Leptocarydion, Notochloe, Plinthanthesis, Poa, Puccinellia, Rytidosperma, Scolochloa, Spartina, Torreyochloa, Trichoneura, Tridens, Triplasis, Tripogon, and Vaseyochloa.

== See also ==
- Carnegie expedition of 1896
- Komatiite, a rare lava rock from the Archaean Era said to have the texture of this grass
- Spinifex pigeon
