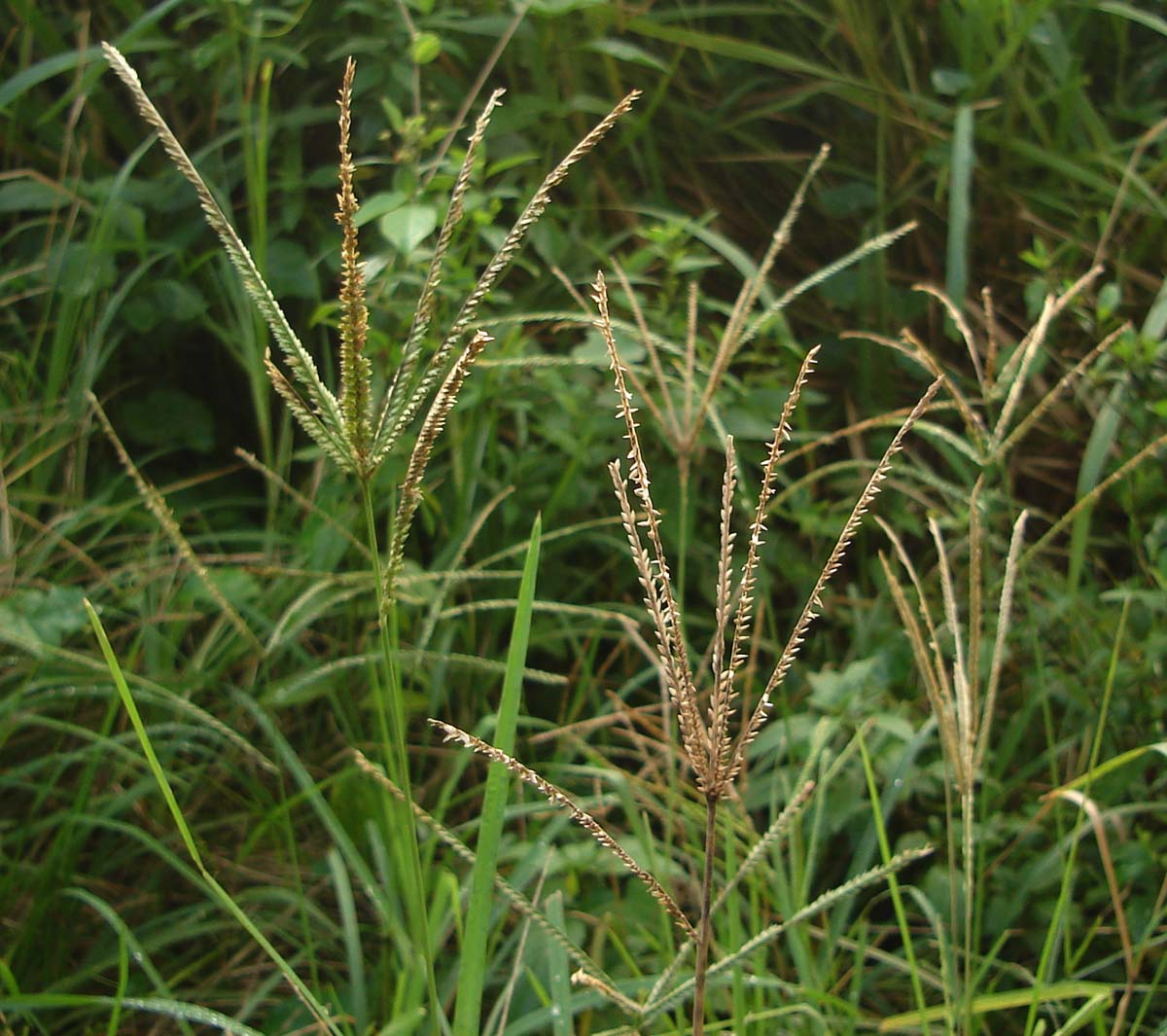
- Goosegrass (Eleusine indica)

Scientific classification
- Kingdom: Plantae
- Clade: Tracheophytes
- Clade: Angiosperms
- Clade: Monocots
- Clade: Commelinids
- Order: Poales
- Family: Poaceae
- Clade: PACMAD clade
- Subfamily: Chloridoideae
- Tribe: Cynodonteae; Dumort. (1824)

Genera
- 94 genera, see text

Synonyms
- Aeluropodieae Nevski ex Bor (1965); Chlorideae Rchb. (1828, unranked); Chlorideae Trin. (1824, nom. illeg.); Hubbardochloinae Auquier (1980); Jouveae Pilg. (1956); Leptureae Dumort. (1824, as Lepiureae); Monermeae C.E. Hubb. (1948, nom. inval.); Nazieae Hitchc. (1920, nom. illeg.); Pappophoreae Kunth (1829); Perotideae C.E. Hubb. (1960); Pommereulleae Bor (1960); Trageae Hitchc. (1927); Triodieae S.W.L. Jacobs (2004)

= Cynodonteae =

Tribe of grasses

Cynodonteae is a large tribe of grasses in the subfamily Chloridoideae, with over 800 species.

Like most of the subfamily, species in the tribe are adapted to warm, arid climates and use the C_{4} photosynthetic pathway. Some species, such as Bermuda grass (Cynodon dactylon) or goosegrass (Eleusine indica), are widespread weeds, introduced in many countries.

Most of the 94 genera are classified in one of 21 subtribes, but some are still unplaced (incertae sedis) within the tribe.

incertae sedis

- Allolepis
- Jouvea
- Kalinia
- Kampochloa
- Lepturidium
- Sclerodactylon
- Sohnsia
- Vietnamochloa

Aeluropodinae

- Aeluropus
- Odyssea

Dactylocteniinae

- Acrachne
- Brachychloa
- Dactyloctenium
- Neobouteloua

Eleusininae

- Afrotrichloris
- Apochiton
- Astrebla
- Austrochloris
- Chloris (syn. Lintonia, Ochthochloa)
- Chrysochloa
- Coelachyrum (syn. Coelachyropsis)
- Cynodon (syn. Brachyachne)
- Daknopholis
- Dinebra (syn. Drake-Brockmania, Heterocarpha, Oxydenia)
- Diplachne
- Disakisperma (syn. Cypholepis)
- Eleusine
- Enteropogon
- Eustachys
- Harpochloa
- Leptochloa (syn. Trichloris)
- Lepturus
- Micrachne
- Microchloa (syn. Rendlia)
- Neostapfiella
- Oxychloris
- Pommereulla
- Rheochloa
- Schoenefeldia
- Stapfochloa
- Tetrapogon (syn. Saugetia)

Orcuttiinae

- Neostapfia
- Orcuttia (syn. Tuctoria)

Orininae

- Cleistogenes
- Orinus

Pappophorinae

- Neesiochloa
- Pappophorum
- Tridens (syn. Antonella)

Triodiinae

- Triodia (syn. Monodia, Plectrachne, Symplectrodia)

Tripogoninae

- Desmostachya
- Eragrostiella
- Halopyrum
- Melanocenchris
- Oropetium
- Tripogon
- Tripogonella

Supersubtribe Boutelouodinae

Boutelouinae

- Bouteloua (syn. Buchloe, Buchlomimus, Cathestecum, Chondrosum, Cyclostachya, Griffithsochloa, Opizia, Pentarrhaphis, Pringleochloa, Soderstromia)

Hilariinae

- Hilaria (syn. Pleuraphis)

Monanthochloinae

- Distichlis (syn. Monanthochloe, Reederochloa)

Muhlenbergiinae

- Muhlenbergia (syn. Aegopogon, Bealia, Blepharoneuron, Chaboissaea, Lycurus, Pereilema, Redfieldia, Schaffnerella, Schedonnardus)

Scleropogoninae

- Blepharidachne
- Dasyochloa
- Erioneuron
- Munroa
- Scleropogon
- Swallenia

Traginae

- Monelytrum
- Orthacanthus
- Pogononeura
- Polevansia
- Tragus
- Willkommia (syn. Willbleibia)

Supersubtribe Gouiniodinae

Cteniinae

- Ctenium

Farragininae

- Craspedorhachis
- Farrago

Gouiniinae

- Gouinia
- Schenckochloa
- Tridentopsis
- Triplasiella
- Triplasis
- Vaseyochloa

Hubbardochloinae

- Bewsia
- Decaryella
- Dignathia
- Gymnopogon
- Hubbardochloa
- Leptocarydion
- Leptothrium (syn. Latipes)
- Lophacme

Perotidinae

- Mosdenia
- Perotis (syn. Lopholepis, Toliara)
- Trigonochloa

Trichoneurinae

- Trichoneura

Zaqiqahinae

- Zaqiqah
