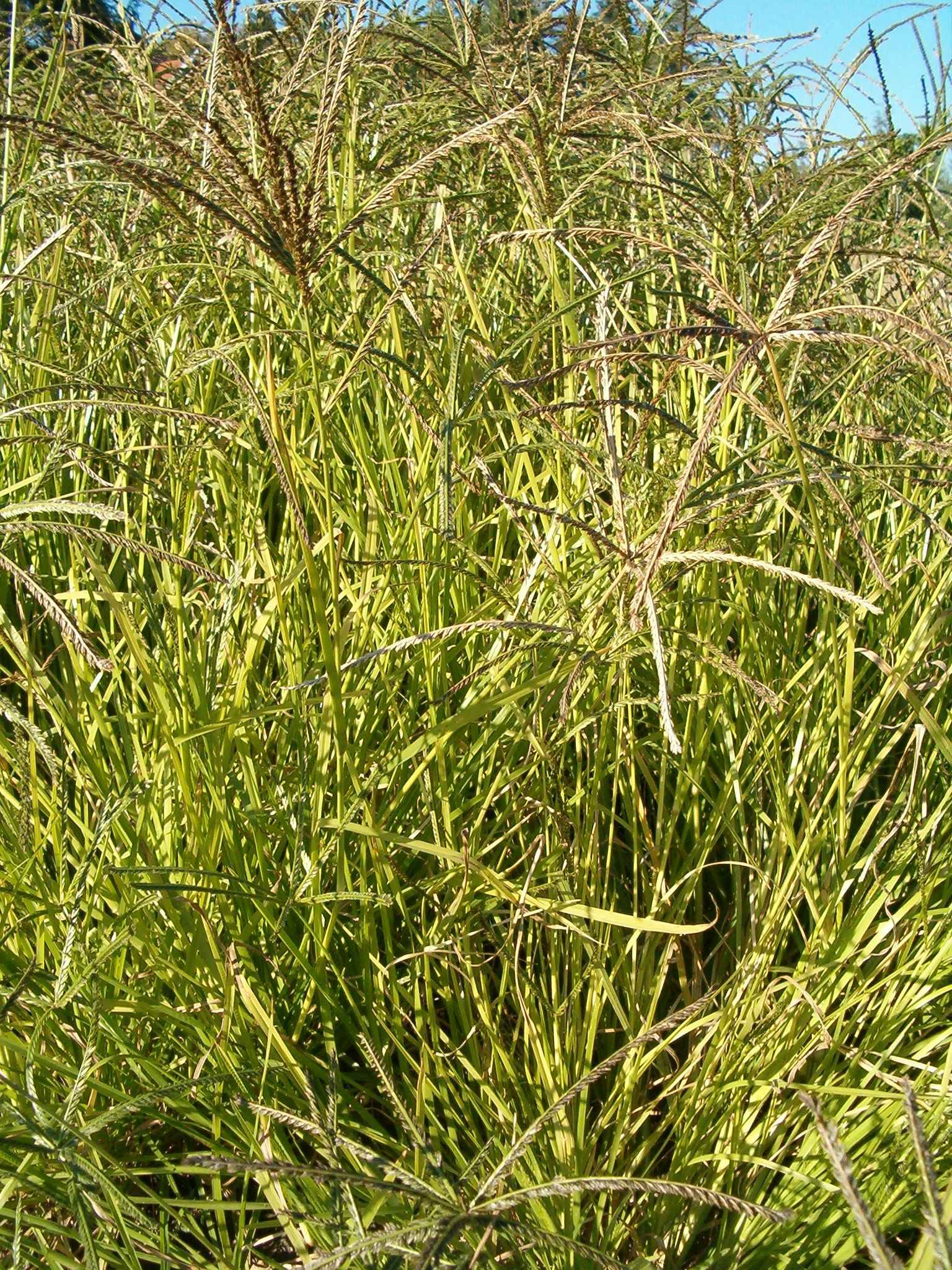
- Eleusine indica

Scientific classification
- Kingdom: Plantae
- Clade: Tracheophytes
- Clade: Angiosperms
- Clade: Monocots
- Clade: Commelinids
- Order: Poales
- Family: Poaceae
- Subfamily: Chloridoideae
- Tribe: Cynodonteae
- Subtribe: Eleusininae
- Genus: Eleusine; Gaertn.

Type species
- Eleusine coracana (L.) Gaertn.

Synonyms
- Elevsine Gaertn., alternate spelling

= Eleusine =

Genus of grasses

Eleusine is a genus of Asian, African, and South American plants in the grass family, sometimes referred to by the common name goosegrass.

Several species of Eleusine are useful, with Eleusine coracana in particular, also known as finger millet, being cultivated as a cereal grain in India and parts of Africa since the third millennium BCE. One species, Eleusine indica, is a widespread weed.

== Species ==
- Eleusine africana – Africa (from South Africa to Egypt + Senegal), Madagascar, Comoros, Sinai, Saudi Arabia, Yemen, Oman
- Eleusine coracana – tropical Africa; naturalized in parts of Asia (Arabia, India, China, Japan, Indonesia, etc.), Western Australia, Fiji, Micronesia, etc.
- Eleusine floccifolia – Eritrea, Ethiopia, Somalia, Yemen
- Eleusine indica – Asia, Africa, Papuasia; naturalized in Mediterranean, Australia, Americas, various islands
- Eleusine intermedia – Kenya, Ethiopia
- Eleusine jaegeri – Kenya, Ethiopia, Tanzania, Uganda
- Eleusine kigeziensis – Ethiopia, Uganda, Zaïre, Rwanda, Burundi
- Eleusine multiflora – Kenya, Ethiopia, Tanzania, Eritrea, Yemen, Saudi Arabia; naturalized in South Africa, Mexico, Lesotho
- Eleusine semisterilis – Kenya
- Eleusine tristachya – Brazil, Bolivia, Paraguay, Uruguay, Argentina, Chile incl Juan Fernández Islands

== Formerly included ==
Some species previously included in the Eleusine genus are now considered better suited to other genera. These include Acrachne, Aeluropus, Chloris, Coelachyrum, Dactyloctenium, Dinebra, Disakisperma,Eragrostis, Harpochloa, Leptochloa, Ochthochloa, Sclerodactylon, Uniola and Wangenheimia.
