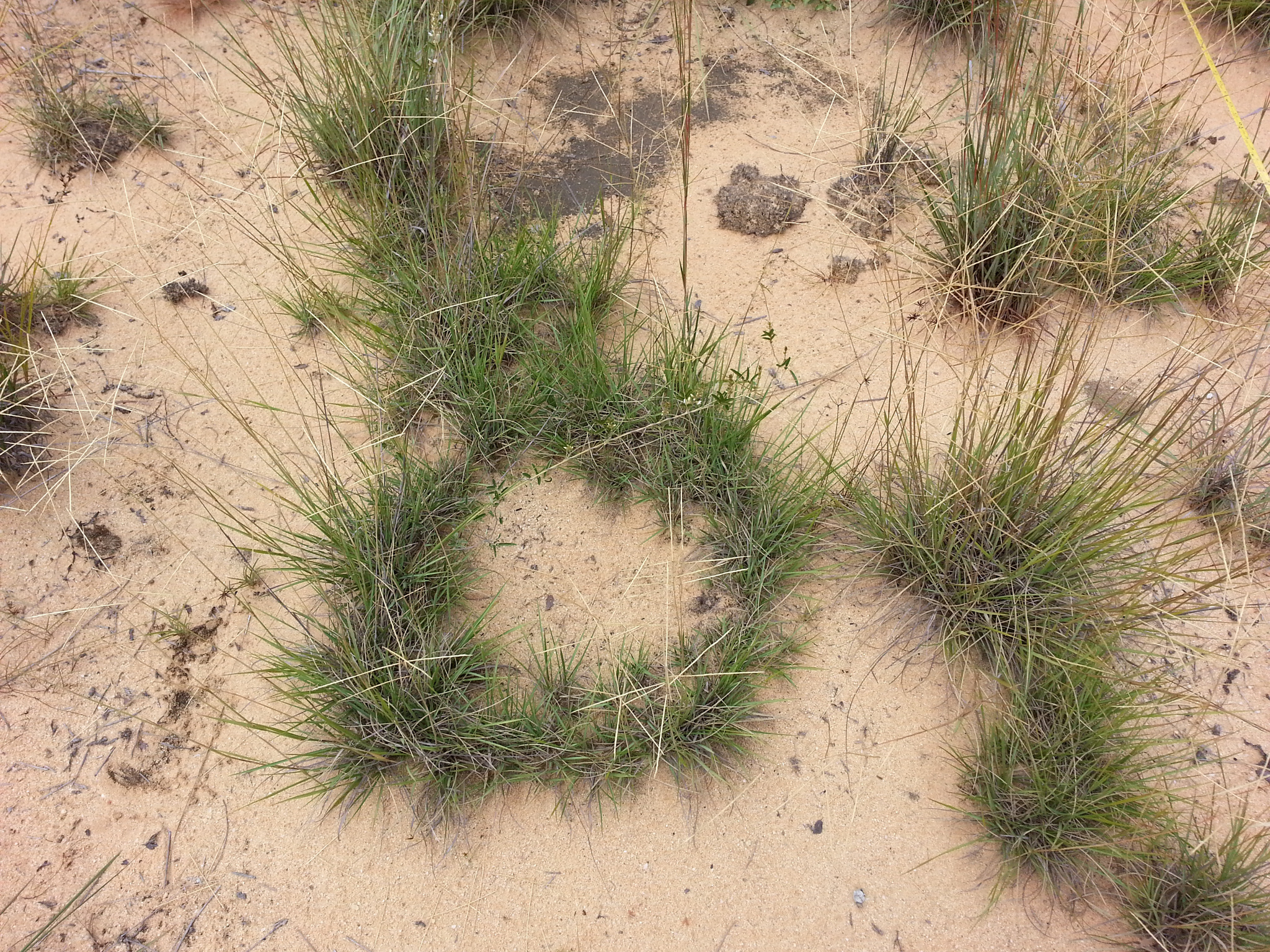
- Craspedorhachis africana

Scientific classification
- Kingdom: Plantae
- Clade: Tracheophytes
- Clade: Angiosperms
- Clade: Monocots
- Clade: Commelinids
- Order: Poales
- Family: Poaceae
- Subfamily: Chloridoideae
- Tribe: Cynodonteae
- Subtribe: Farragininae
- Genus: Craspedorhachis; Benth.

Type species
- Craspedorhachis africana Benth.

= Craspedorhachis =

Genus of grasses

Craspedorhachis is a genus of African plants in the grass family.

Species

- Craspedorhachis africana Benth. - Madagascar, Mozambique, Malawi, Zambia, Zimbabwe, Namibia, Limpopo
- Craspedorhachis digitata Kupicha & Cope - Zimbabwe
- Craspedorhachis rhodesiana Rendle - Angola, Zambia, Zimbabwe, Mozambique, Botswana, Namibia

formerly included

Several names have been coined with the name Craspedorhachis but refer to species now considered better suited to other genera (Dinebra Trigonochloa and Willkommia). Here are links to help you find more information.

- Craspedorhachis menyharthii - Trigonochloa uniflora
- Craspedorhachis perrieri - Dinebra perrieri
- Craspedorhachis sarmentosa - Willkommia sarmentosa
- Craspedorhachis texana - Willkommia texana
- Craspedorhachis uniflora - Trigonochloa uniflora
