= T. scintillans =

T. scintillans may refer to a . The specific epithet scintillans refers to something that sparkles.

- Teinobasis scintillans, a dragonfly in the family Coenagrionidae
- Thwaitesia scintillans, a spider in the family Theridiidae
- Tremophora scintillans, a moth in the family Tortricidae
- Trigonophorus scintillans, a beetle in the family Cetoniidae
- Trinchesia scintillans, a sea slug in the family Trinchesiidae
- Triodia scintillans, a grass in the family Poaceae
- Trirhithrum scintillans, a fly in the family Tephritidae

== See also ==
- Abrolhos painted buttonquail, which has a scientific name that is abbreviated as T. v. scintillans
