= Triodia scintillans =

Scientific classification
- Kingdom: Plantae
- Clade: Tracheophytes
- Clade: Angiosperms
- Clade: Monocots
- Clade: Commelinids
- Order: Poales
- Family: Poaceae
- Subfamily: Chloridoideae
- Tribe: Cynodonteae
- Subtribe: Triodiinae
- Genus: Triodia
- Species group: Triodia basedowii species complex
- Species: T. scintillans

Binomial name
- Triodia scintillans B.M.Anderson & M.D.Barrett 2017
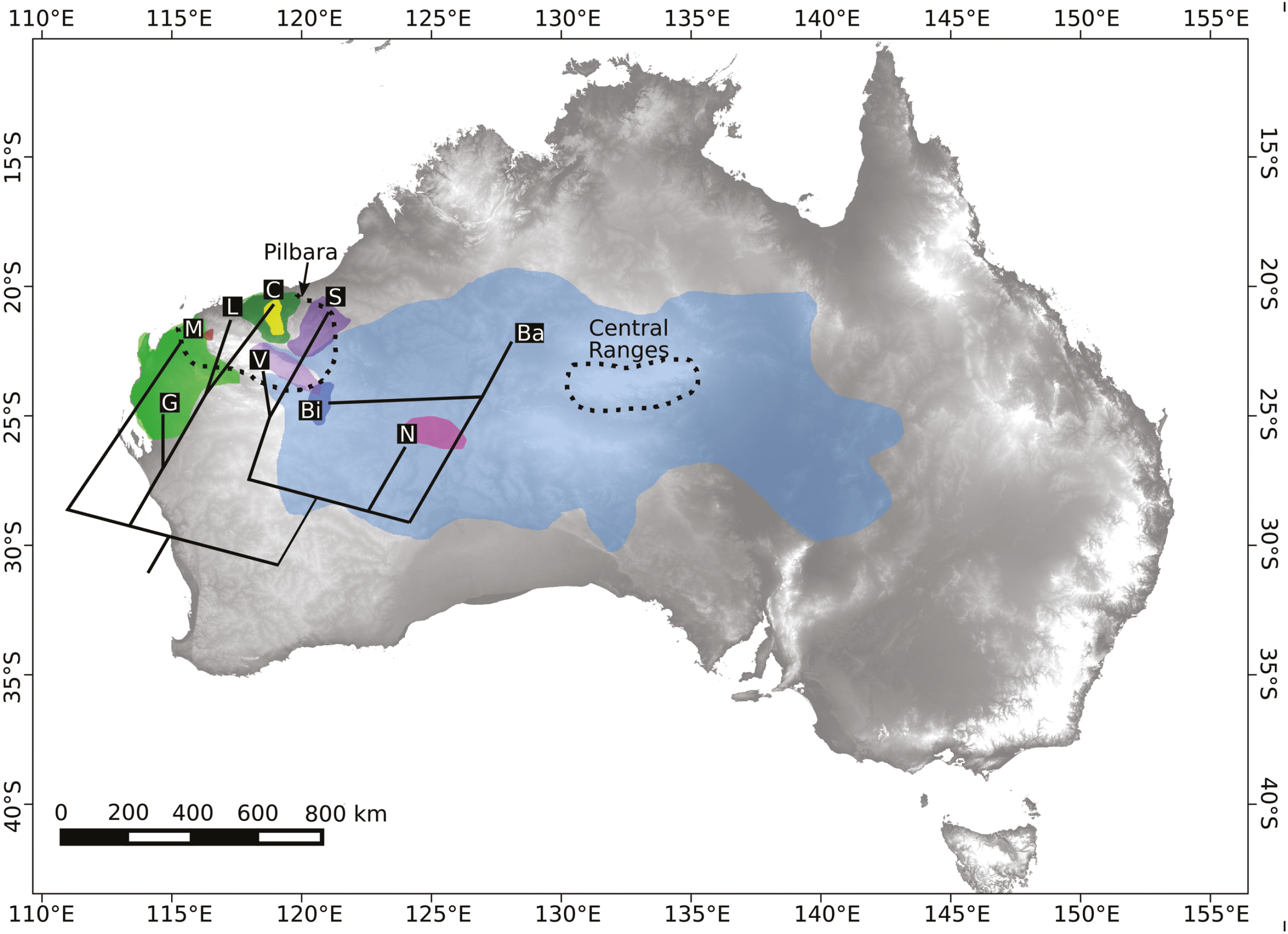
- Distribution of taxa in the Triodia basedowii complex, with a superimposed phylogenetic tree. T. scintillans is in purple and labeled "S".

Species of grass endemic to Western Australia

Triodia scintillans, the sparkling spinifex, or salt and vinegar chips spinifex is a species of grass in the genus Triodia. It tastes like salt and vinegar potato chips.

== Names ==
The specific epithet scintillans was chosen with help from Alex George and derives from the Latin word scintillo which means "to sparkle". This refers to the distinct sparkly droplets on young leaves which is especially apparent in direct sun. The common name "sparkling spinifex" is a calque of that Latin binomial. Although this plant is not in the genus Spinifex, members of the genus Triodia are commonly called "spinifex". T. vanleeuwenii is also called sparking spinifex.

Triodia scintillans is referred to as salt and vinegar chips spinifex because the little leaf droplets have a similar taste to the chips. The plant was not tasted intentionally, and eating it is not recommended.

The species was informally called "Triodia sp. Warrawagine" initially, referencing a cattle station in the region.

== Taxonomy ==
Triodia scintillans is in the T. basedowii species complex along with eight other species, T. basedowii, T. birriliburu, T. chichesterensis, T. glabra, T. lanigera, T. mallota, T. nana, and T. vanleeuwenii. Within the complex, it is in an informal clade called the eastern group, along with T. basedowii, T. birriliburu, T. nana, and T. vanleeuwenii. Analysis of internal transcribed spacer and external transcribed spacer sequences show a close relative of T. scintillans is T. vanleeuwenii, which shares the leaf droplets. The two species possibly hybridize where the ranges overlap near Roy Hill Station. A more recent study on chloroplast DNA indicated that the closest relative of T. scinitillans is T. basedowii instead of T. vanleeuwenii.

== Distribution ==
Triodia scintillans is endemic to Western Australia and found north of the Fortescue River valley in the Mackay subregion of the Great Sandy Desert and the Chichester and Fortescue subregions of the Pilbara shrublands. The type was collected by M. D. Barrett in Western Australia on Woodie Woodie Road, 19 kilometers south of the turn-off to Telfer.

The plant grows on slopes and plains, on primarily gravelly soils.

The conservation status for the species has been described as "least concern" and "not threatened".

== Description ==
Individual plants grow in 20–50 cm tall hummocks.

The leaf sheaths are glabrous with scintillating droplets, which tend to become crystalline when dried. The purpose of the droplets is unknown, but possibly to deter herbivores.

The sheath opening is villous or woolly with 1.5–2.5 mm trichomes (hairs) that sometimes wear off on older leaves. Plants have ligules that are 0.5–1 mm long. The leaf blades are short for the genus, typically 40–100 mm long. They are glabrous or rarely with a few trichomes spreading onto the 1–3 mm long pseudopetiole.

Flowers appear on 0.7–1 m tall culms in February, March, and July–August after heavy rainfall. The inflorescences are highly-branched and 40–98 mm long racemose panicle with seven to nineteen spikelets. The pedicels are 1–18 mm long. Spikelets are 3.5–8 mm by 7–13 mm with four to ten florets. The florets are restricted by the glumes for a portion of the length. The lower glume is 2.5–4 by 4–7.8 mm and slightly scabrous to glabrous with an acuminate to acute apex. The lowest lemma is 5–9 mm long with three deep lobes. The palea ~3 by ~1 mm, with few to no trichomes underneath. The keels (main ridge) of the palea are puberulent. The keel has a thickened surface, the body less so, with the thickness becoming weaker towards the somewhat truncate and sometimes ciliate apex. The rhachilla segment is 0.5–1 mm long and the lodicules are 0.2–0.5 mm long. The anthers in the flower are 2.2–3.5 mm long. The caryopsis (seed) is unseen.

Triodia scintillans is diploid. The plastome is 135,301 bp, and its GC-content is 38.4%.

== Ecology ==
Nothing is known to eat the grass, and cows refuse to graze on it.
