= Sohnsia =

Scientific classification
- Kingdom: Plantae
- Clade: Tracheophytes
- Clade: Angiosperms
- Clade: Monocots
- Clade: Commelinids
- Order: Poales
- Family: Poaceae
- Subfamily: Chloridoideae
- Tribe: Cynodonteae
- Genus: Sohnsia; Airy Shaw
- Species: S. filifolia

Binomial name
- Sohnsia filifolia (E.Fourn.) Airy Shaw

Synonyms
- Calamochloa E.Fourn. 1877, non Calamochloe Rchb. 1828; Eufournia Reeder; Calamochloa filifolia E.Fourn.; Eufournia filifolia (E.Fourn.) Reeder

Genus of grasses

Sohnsia is a genus of plants in the grass family. The only known species is Sohnsia filifolia, native to the States of San Luis Potosí and Querétaro in northeastern Mexico. It is dioecious, with its chromosome number being 2n = 20.
