= Lophacme =

Scientific classification
- Kingdom: Plantae
- Clade: Tracheophytes
- Clade: Angiosperms
- Clade: Monocots
- Clade: Commelinids
- Order: Poales
- Family: Poaceae
- Subfamily: Chloridoideae
- Tribe: Cynodonteae
- Subtribe: Hubbardochloinae
- Genus: Lophacme; Stapf

Type species
- Lophacme digitata Stapf

Genus of grasses

Lophacme is a genus of African plants in the grass family.

Species

- Lophacme digitata Stapf - Zambia, Zimbabwe, Angola, Free State, Limpopo, Gauteng, Mpumalanga, Free State, KwaZulu-Natal
- Lophacme parva Renvoize & Clayton - Zambia

formerly included

see Enteropogon

- Lophacme incompleta - Enteropogon dolichostachyus
