= Scleropogon =

Scleropogon is the scientific name of two genera of organisms and may refer to:

- Scleropogon (fly), a genus of insects in the family Asilidae
- Scleropogon (plant), a genus of plants in the family Poaceae
