= Trichoneura =

Trichoneura is the scientific name of two genera of organisms and may refer to:

- Trichoneura (fly), a genus of flies in the family Limoniidae
- Trichoneura (plant), a genus of plants in the family Poaceae
