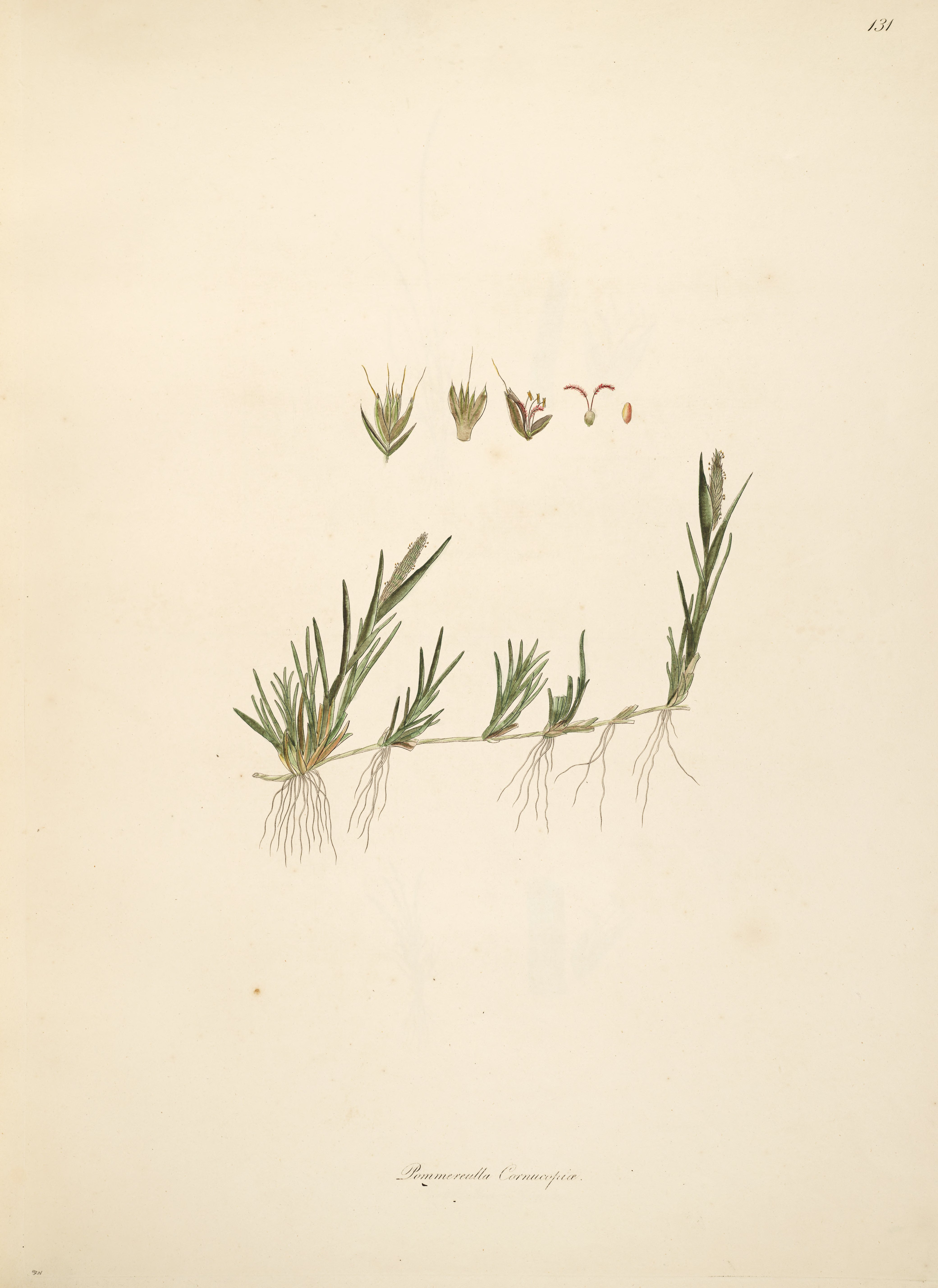
- Botanical drawing, 1798

Scientific classification
- Kingdom: Plantae
- Clade: Tracheophytes
- Clade: Angiosperms
- Clade: Monocots
- Clade: Commelinids
- Order: Poales
- Family: Poaceae
- Subfamily: Chloridoideae
- Tribe: Cynodonteae
- Subtribe: Eleusininae
- Genus: Pommereulla; L.f.
- Species: P. cornucopiae

Binomial name
- Pommereulla cornucopiae L.f.

Synonyms
- Pommereulla elongata Wight & Arn. ex Steud.

= Pommereulla =

Genus of grasses

Pommereulla is a genus of Indian and Sri Lankan plants in the grass family. The only known species is Pommereulla cornucopiae, native to Sri Lanka and Tamil Nadu. The genus is dedicated to Elizabeth Jullienne du Gage de Pommereul (1733-1782), a French female botanist.

formerly included

see Melanocenchris

- Pommereulla monoeca – Melanocenchris monoica
- Pommereulla royleana – Melanocenchris jacquemontii
