= Oreophyton =

Scientific classification
- Kingdom: Plantae
- Clade: Embryophytes
- Clade: Tracheophytes
- Clade: Spermatophytes
- Clade: Angiosperms
- Clade: Eudicots
- Clade: Rosids
- Order: Brassicales
- Family: Brassicaceae
- Genus: Oreophyton; O.E.Schulz
- Species: O. falcatum

Binomial name
- Oreophyton falcatum (E.Fourn.) O.E.Schulz

Synonyms
- Arabis falcata A.Rich.; Braya falcata Hochst. ex A.Rich.; Hesperis falcosa Kuntze; Oreophyton falcatum f. depauperatum O.E.Schulz; Oreophyton falcatum var. depauperatum (O.E.Schulz) O.E.Schulz; Oreophyton falcatum f. leiophyllum O.E.Schulz; Sisymbrium falcatum E.Fourn. (1865) (basionym); Stenophragma falcatum (E.Fourn.) Prantl ex Engl.

Genus of plants

Oreophyton is a genus of flowering plants belonging to the family Brassicaceae.

It includes a single species, Oreophyton falcatum, a perennial native to montane tropical Africa from Ethiopia to Kenya, Tanzania, Rwanda, Uganda, and Democratic Republic of the Congo.
