= Leptothrium =

Scientific classification
- Kingdom: Plantae
- Clade: Tracheophytes
- Clade: Angiosperms
- Clade: Monocots
- Clade: Commelinids
- Order: Poales
- Family: Poaceae
- Subfamily: Chloridoideae
- Tribe: Cynodonteae
- Subtribe: Hubbardochloinae
- Genus: Leptothrium; Kunth 1829, conserved name, not Kunth 1816 (Orchidaceae)

Type species
- Leptothrium rigidum Kunth

Synonyms
- Latipes Kunth

Genus of plants

Leptothrium is a genus of African, Asian, and Neotropical plants in the grass family.

Species

- Leptothrium rigidum Kunth - Jamaica, Hispaniola, Colombia, Venezuela
- Leptothrium senegalense (Kunth) Clayton - Africa from Cape Verde to Tanzania and Egypt; Arabian Peninsula, Iran, Afghanistan, Pakistan

homonym

The name Leptothrium in its current sense was coined by Karl Sigismund Kunth in 1829. The same author had used the same name earlier, in 1816, to refer to a species of orchid. This appears to have been in error, with the name merely listed as a synonym, but the name was nevertheless published so it must be considered a homonym. One species name was coined in 1816 using this homonym, i.e.

- Leptothrium lineare (Jacq.) Kunth in F.W.H.von Humboldt, A.J.A.Bonpland & C.S.Kunth 1816, syn of Isochilus linearis (Jacq.) R.Br. in W.T.Aiton 1813
