= Schoenefeldia =

Scientific classification
- Kingdom: Plantae
- Clade: Tracheophytes
- Clade: Angiosperms
- Clade: Monocots
- Clade: Commelinids
- Order: Poales
- Family: Poaceae
- Subfamily: Chloridoideae
- Tribe: Cynodonteae
- Subtribe: Eleusininae
- Genus: Schoenefeldia; Kunth (1829)
- Species: S. gracilis

Binomial name
- Schoenefeldia gracilis Kunth (1830)

Synonyms
- Chloris myosuroides Hook.f. (1896); Chloris pallida (Edgew.) Hook.f. (1896), nom. illeg.; Schoenefeldia nutans Steud. (1854); Schoenefeldia pallida Edgew. (1853); Schoenefeldia ramosa Trin. (1836); Schoenefeldia stricta Steud. (1854)

Genus of grasses

Schoenefeldia is a genus of Asian and African plants in the grass family. It contains a single species, Schoenefeldia gracilis, an annual grass native to the Sahara and Sahel in Africa, to Saudi Arabia and Yemen on the Arabian Peninsula, and to India and Pakistan.
