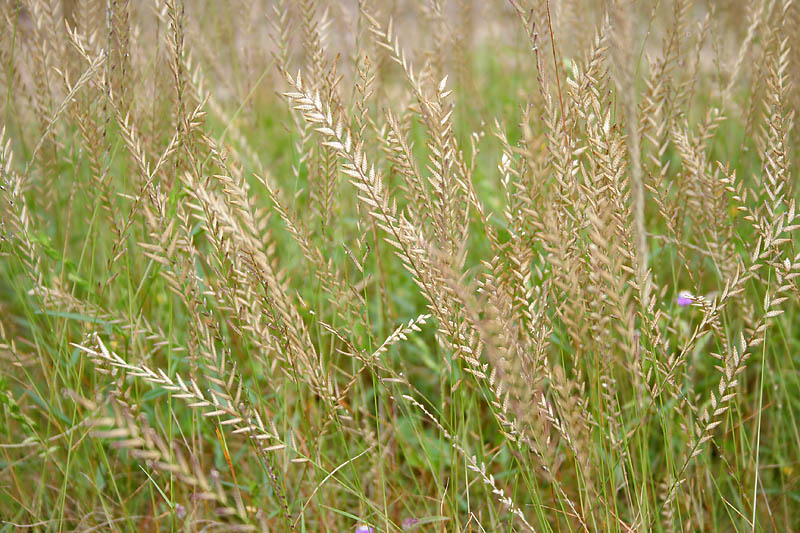
- Eragrostiella bifaria Hyderabad, India

Scientific classification
- Kingdom: Plantae
- Clade: Tracheophytes
- Clade: Angiosperms
- Clade: Monocots
- Clade: Commelinids
- Order: Poales
- Family: Poaceae
- Subfamily: Chloridoideae
- Tribe: Cynodonteae
- Subtribe: Tripogoninae
- Genus: Eragrostiella; Bor

Type species
- Eragrostiella leioptera (Stapf) Bor

= Eragrostiella =

Genus of grasses

Eragrostiella is a genus of Asian, African, and Australian plants in the grass family.

Species

- Eragrostiella bifaria (Vahl) Bor - Ethiopia, Kenya, Tanzania, Indian subcontinent, Andaman Islands, Myanmar, Thailand, Queensland
- Eragrostiella brachyphylla (Stapf) Bor - India, Bangladesh, Sri Lanka
- Eragrostiella collettii (Stapf) Bor - Andaman Islands, Myanmar
- Eragrostiella leioptera (Stapf) Bor - Assam
- Eragrostiella lolioides (Hand.-Mazz.) Keng f. - Yunnan
- Eragrostiella nardoides (Trin.) Bor - Himalayas, Nepal, Bhutan, India
