= Triodia stipoides =

Scientific classification
- Kingdom: Plantae
- Clade: Tracheophytes
- Clade: Angiosperms
- Clade: Monocots
- Clade: Commelinids
- Order: Poales
- Family: Poaceae
- Subfamily: Chloridoideae
- Genus: Triodia
- Species: T. stipoides

Binomial name
- Triodia stipoides (S.W.L.Jacobs) Crisp & Mant (2015)

Synonyms
- Monodia stipoides S.W.L.Jacobs (1985)

Species of flowering plant

Triodia stipoides is a species of grass native to the Kimberley region of Western Australia. It is a perennial which grows primarily in the seasonally dry tropics.

It was named Monodia stipoides in 1985 by Surrey Wilfrid Laurance Jacobs, who classified it the sole species in genus Monodia. It was reclassified into genus Triodia in 2015.
