= Afrotrichloris =

Scientific classification
- Kingdom: Plantae
- Clade: Tracheophytes
- Clade: Angiosperms
- Clade: Monocots
- Clade: Commelinids
- Order: Poales
- Family: Poaceae
- Subfamily: Chloridoideae
- Tribe: Cynodonteae
- Subtribe: Eleusininae
- Genus: Afrotrichloris; Chiov.

Type species
- Afrotrichloris martinii Chiov.

Genus of grasses

Afrotrichloris is a genus of East African plants in the grass family.

The type species is named for Ferdinando Martini (1841-1928), who resided as Minister of Colonies and later Governor of Eritrea in the Royal Italian government.

Species

- Afrotrichloris hyaloptera Clayton - Ethiopia, Somalia
- Afrotrichloris martinii Chiov. - Somalia

== See also ==
- List of Poaceae genera
