= Saugetia =

Scientific classification
- Kingdom: Plantae
- Clade: Tracheophytes
- Clade: Angiosperms
- Clade: Monocots
- Clade: Commelinids
- Order: Poales
- Family: Poaceae
- Subfamily: Chloridoideae
- Tribe: Cynodonteae
- Subtribe: Eleusininae
- Genus: Saugetia; Hitchc. & Chase

Type species
- Saugetia fasciculata Hitchc. & Chase

Genus of grasses

Saugetia is a genus of West Indian plants in the grass family.

== Species ==
Species include:

- Saugetia fasciculata Hitchc. & Chase — Cuba, Hispaniola
- Saugetia pleiostachya Hitchc. & Ekman — Cuba
