= Kalinia =

Scientific classification
- Kingdom: Plantae
- Clade: Tracheophytes
- Clade: Angiosperms
- Clade: Monocots
- Clade: Commelinids
- Order: Poales
- Family: Poaceae
- Subfamily: Chloridoideae
- Tribe: Cynodonteae
- Genus: Kalinia; H.L.Bell & Columbus
- Species: K. obtusiflora

Binomial name
- Kalinia obtusiflora (E.Fourn.) H.L.Bell & Columbus

Genus of plants

Kalinia is a genus of flowering plants belonging to the family Poaceae. It includes a single species, Kalinia obtusiflora (E.Fourn.) H.L.Bell & Columbus.

Its native range is the Southwestern USA to Mexico.
