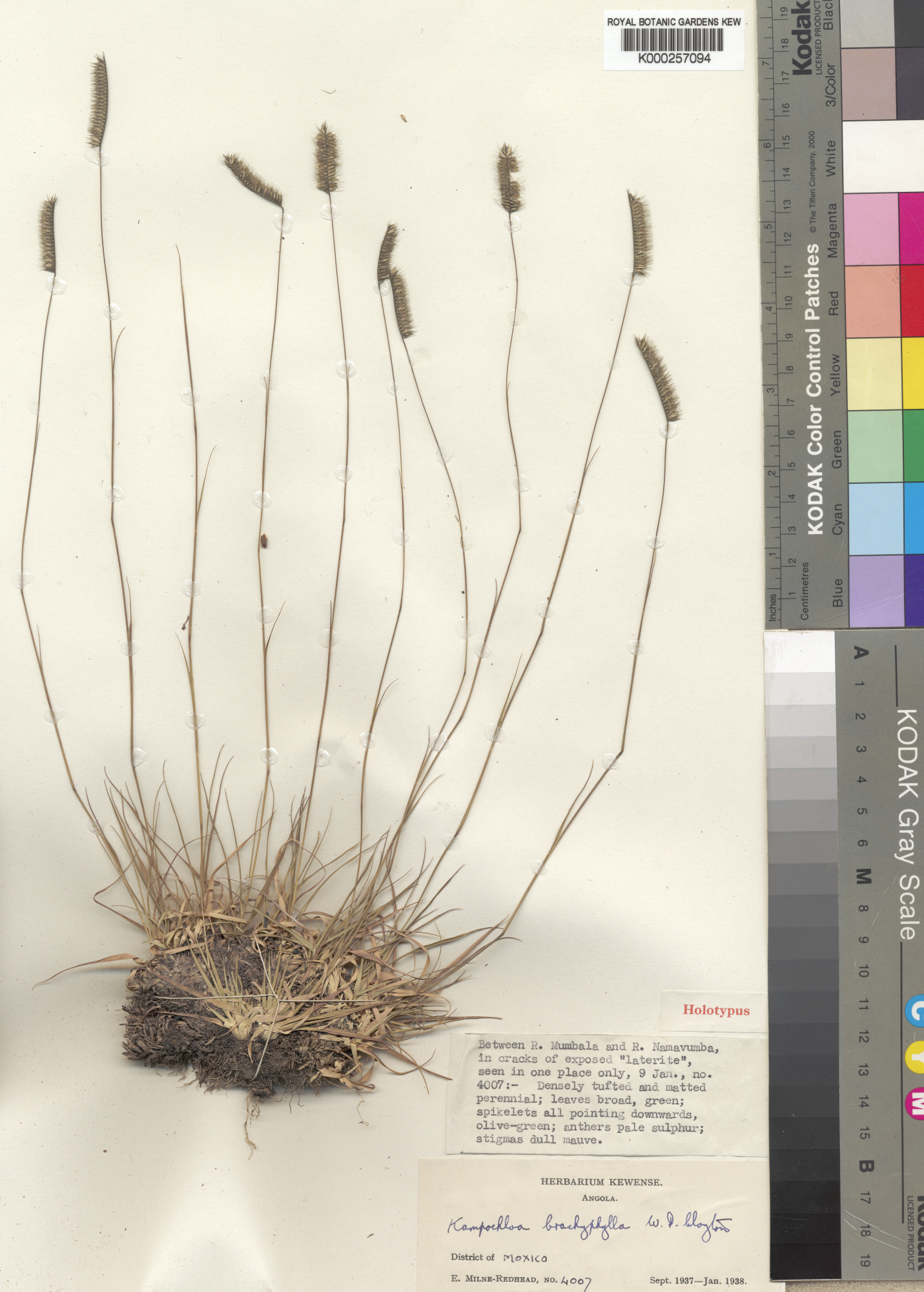

Scientific classification
- Kingdom: Plantae
- Clade: Tracheophytes
- Clade: Angiosperms
- Clade: Monocots
- Clade: Commelinids
- Order: Poales
- Family: Poaceae
- Subfamily: Chloridoideae
- Tribe: Cynodonteae
- Genus: Kampochloa; Clayton
- Species: K. brachyphylla

Binomial name
- Kampochloa brachyphylla Clayton

= Kampochloa =

Genus of grasses

Kampochloa is a genus of African plants in the grass family. The only known species is Kampochloa brachyphylla, native to Zambia and Angola.

04-20-2007

-(c) bouncing of walls last night (almost literally) - so I gave the full dose of clonidine - fell asleep around 8:45 - was up between 2 and 3 but then went back to sleep. O.K this A.m.

-Good start for exercises. To regular class for a visit from a rescue dog + handler. anxious, clenching hands - so I gave (c) a squeeze ball to hold. Worked well! To L.S. for centers. Anxious this AM, lots of picking at eyes. Finished centers, working on puzzle for break. Recess, swings. On way in (c) kept trying to get ahead of those in front of her in line. - pushing has been something we are working on. At classroom door (c) darted forward pushing others away + I caught her - (c) immediately began fighting rather than stop + listen. Turned into an agitated tantrum so we went to L.S. + had lunch there. (c) ranted for a long time + would not eat much. I did not acknowledge ranting + did not try to make her eat. Transitioned well to working on a puzzle again. Very focused on this. Storytime, fine, used squeeze ball again. Back to L.S., puzzle. Art, fine, then jungle party + snacks. Tomorrow is spring carnival at school.
