= Brachychloa =

Scientific classification
- Kingdom: Plantae
- Clade: Tracheophytes
- Clade: Angiosperms
- Clade: Monocots
- Clade: Commelinids
- Order: Poales
- Family: Poaceae
- Subfamily: Chloridoideae
- Tribe: Cynodonteae
- Subtribe: Dactylocteniinae
- Genus: Brachychloa; Phillips

Genus of grasses

Brachychloa is a genus of African plants in the grass family, native to Mozambique and South Africa.

Species

- Brachychloa fragilis S.M.Phillips - Mozambique, Limpopo, Kwazulu-Natal
- Brachychloa schiemanniana (Schweick.) S.M.Phillips - Mozambique, Kwazulu-Natal
