= Triplasiella =

Scientific classification
- Kingdom: Plantae
- Clade: Tracheophytes
- Clade: Angiosperms
- Clade: Monocots
- Clade: Commelinids
- Order: Poales
- Family: Poaceae
- Subfamily: Chloridoideae
- Tribe: Cynodonteae
- Subtribe: Gouiniinae
- Genus: Triplasiella; P.M.Peterson & Romasch. (2016)
- Species: T. eragrostoides

Binomial name
- Triplasiella eragrostoides (Vasey & Scribn.) P.M.Peterson & Romasch. (2016)

Synonyms
- Sieglingia eragrostoides (Vasey & Scribn.) L.H.Dewey (1894); Tridens eragrostoides (Vasey & Scribn.) Nash (1903); Tridentopsis eragrostoides (Vasey & Scribn.) P.M.Peterson (2014); Sieglingia eragrostoides var. scabra Vasey ex Beal (1896); Triodia eragrostoides Vasey & Scribn. (1890); Triodia eragrostoides var. scabra (Vasey ex Beal) Bush (1902)

Genus of flowering plants

Triplasiella is a genus of flowering plants belonging to the family Poaceae. It contains a single species, Triplasiella eragrostoides. It is a perennial or rhizomatous geophyte grass native to the southern United States (Florida to Arizona), northeastern and southeastern Mexico, Cuba, and Venezuela.
