= André Thouin =

French botanist (1747–1824)

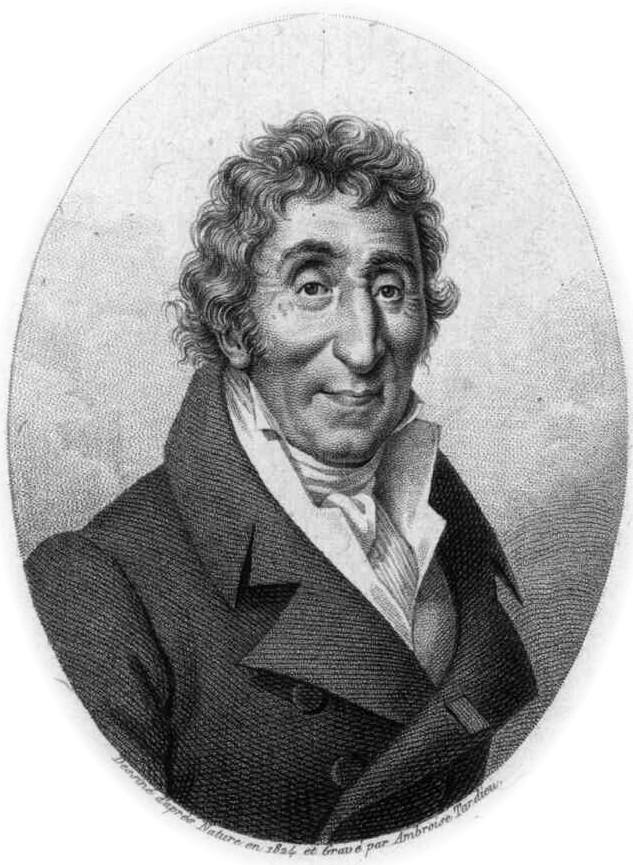
André Thouin

André Thouin (10 February 1747 – 24 October 1824) was a French botanist.

Thouin studied botany under Bernard de Jussieu, and in 1793 attained the chair of horticulture at the Muséum national d'histoire naturelle in Paris. He was a good friend of U.S. President Thomas Jefferson, and the godfather of Jean Baptiste Lamarck's son Andre.

He is remembered for contributions made in the field of agronomy, including scientific studies that involved improved grafting techniques and seed selection. He played an important role in the reshaping of Natural History in France during the revolution. He was sent by Napoleon to confiscate natural history specimens from museums and collections in the countries that Napoleon had conquered. He was a pioneer conservationist, stressing the importance of replacing woodlands to compensate for their destruction due to human encroachment.

The plant genre, Thouinia (family Sapindaceae, 1804) from Central and South America, and Thouinidium (family Sapindaceae, 1878) from Mexico and Central America, are both named after him.

As a taxonomist, he described at least 15 new species. Most have been degraded to synonyms.

Thouin supervised Elisabeth Julienne Pommereul in her work at the Jardin du Roi.

== Selected publications ==
- Description de l'École d'agriculture pratique du Muséum d'histoire naturelle, (1814).
- Manuel d'arboriculture. Manuel illustré de la culture, de la taille et de la greffe des arbres fruitiers.
- Monographie des greffes, ou Description technique des diverses sortes de greffes employées pour la multiplication des végétaux, (1821).
- Traite des arbres forestiers :ou histoire et description des arbres indigenes ou naturalises... /par M. Jaume Saint-Hilaire. Ouvrage precede d'une instruction sur la culture des arbres, (1824).
- Cours de culture et de naturalisation des végétaux, (1827).
