= Micrachne =

Scientific classification
- Kingdom: Plantae
- Clade: Tracheophytes
- Clade: Angiosperms
- Clade: Monocots
- Clade: Commelinids
- Order: Poales
- Family: Poaceae
- Subfamily: Chloridoideae
- Tribe: Cynodonteae
- Subtribe: Eleusininae
- Genus: Micrachne; P.M.Peterson, Romasch. & Y.Herrera

Genus of plants

Micrachne is a genus of flowering plants belonging to the family Poaceae.

Its native range is Tropical Africa to Botswana.

Species:

- Micrachne fulva (Stapf) P.M.Peterson
- Micrachne obtusiflora (Benth.) P.M.Peterson
- Micrachne patentiflora (Stent & J.M.Rattray) P.M.Peterson
- Micrachne pilosa (Van der Veken) P.M.Peterson
- Micrachne simonii (Kupicha & Cope) P.M.Peterson
