= Dignathia =

Scientific classification
- Kingdom: Plantae
- Clade: Tracheophytes
- Clade: Angiosperms
- Clade: Monocots
- Clade: Commelinids
- Order: Poales
- Family: Poaceae
- Subfamily: Chloridoideae
- Tribe: Cynodonteae
- Subtribe: Hubbardochloinae
- Genus: Dignathia; Stapf

Type species
- Dignathia gracilis Stapf

Genus of grasses

Dignathia is a genus of African and Asian plants in the grass family.

Species

- Dignathia aristata Cope - Kenya
- Dignathia ciliata C.E.Hubb. - Ethiopia, Somalia
- Dignathia gracilis Stapf - Somalia, Kenya, Tanzania, Mozambique
- Dignathia hirtella Stapf - Ethiopia, Somalia, Kenya, Oman, Yemen, Gujarat
- Dignathia villosa C.E.Hubb. - Ethiopia, Somalia
