= Monelytrum =

Scientific classification
- Kingdom: Plantae
- Clade: Tracheophytes
- Clade: Angiosperms
- Clade: Monocots
- Clade: Commelinids
- Order: Poales
- Family: Poaceae
- Subfamily: Chloridoideae
- Tribe: Cynodonteae
- Subtribe: Traginae
- Genus: Monelytrum; Hack.
- Species: M. luederitzianum

Binomial name
- Monelytrum luederitzianum Hack.

Synonyms
- Monelytrum annuum Gooss.

Genus of grasses

Monelytrum is a monotypic genus of grass in the family Poaceae. Its sole species, Monelytrum luederitzianum (commonly known in English as Lüderitz grass) is endemic to Namibia. Both common and scientific names were named for the city of Lüderitz, located in the far south of Namibia.
