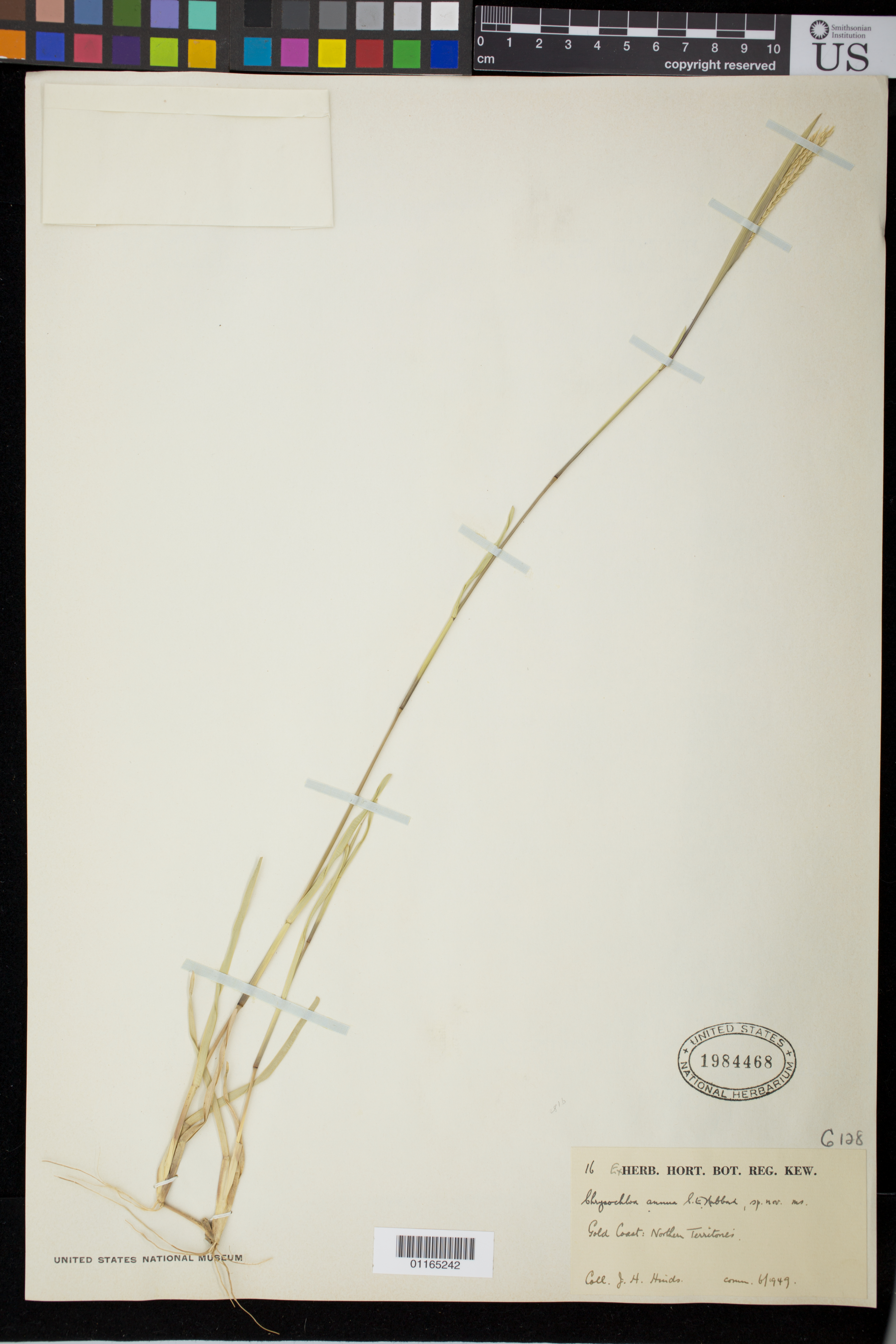
- Chrysochloa annua (now Chrysochloa subaequigluma)

Scientific classification
- Kingdom: Plantae
- Clade: Tracheophytes
- Clade: Angiosperms
- Clade: Monocots
- Clade: Commelinids
- Order: Poales
- Family: Poaceae
- Subfamily: Chloridoideae
- Tribe: Cynodonteae
- Subtribe: Eleusininae
- Genus: Chrysochloa; Swallen

Type species
- Bracteola lucida (syn of Chrysochloa subaequigluma) Swallen

Synonyms
- Bracteola Swallen 1933, not a valid name because it coincides with a technical term

= Chrysochloa =

Genus of grasses

Chrysochloa is a genus of African plants in the grass family Poaceae.

Species

- Chrysochloa orientalis (C.E.Hubb.) Swallen – Democratic Republic of the Congo, Tanzania, Kenya, Uganda
- Chrysochloa subaequigluma (Rendle) Swallen – tropical Africa from Senegal to Malawi

== See also ==
- List of Poaceae genera
