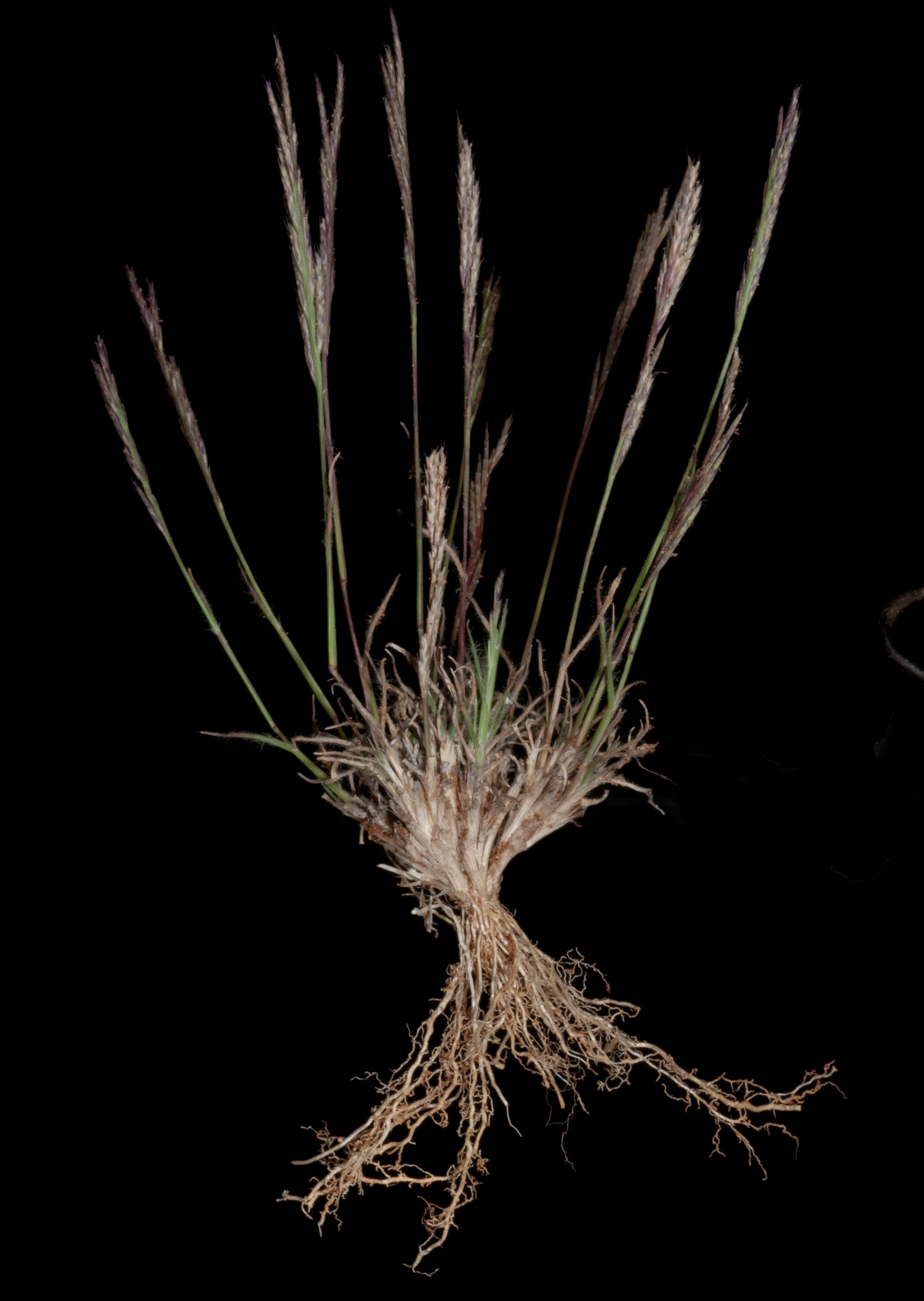
- Tripogon loliiformis

Scientific classification
- Kingdom: Plantae
- Clade: Embryophytes
- Clade: Tracheophytes
- Clade: Spermatophytes
- Clade: Angiosperms
- Clade: Monocots
- Clade: Commelinids
- Order: Poales
- Family: Poaceae
- Subfamily: Chloridoideae
- Tribe: Cynodonteae
- Subtribe: Tripogoninae
- Genus: Tripogonella; P.M.Peterson & Romasch.

= Tripogonella =

Genus of flowering plants

Tripogonella is a genus of flowering plants belonging to the family Poaceae.

Its native range is Tropical and Subtropical America, Africa, New Guinea to Australia.

Species:

- Tripogonella loliiformis (F.Muell.) P.M.Peterson & Romasch.
- Tripogonella minima (A.Rich.) P.M.Peterson & Romasch.
- Tripogonella spicata (Nees) P.M.Peterson & Romasch.
