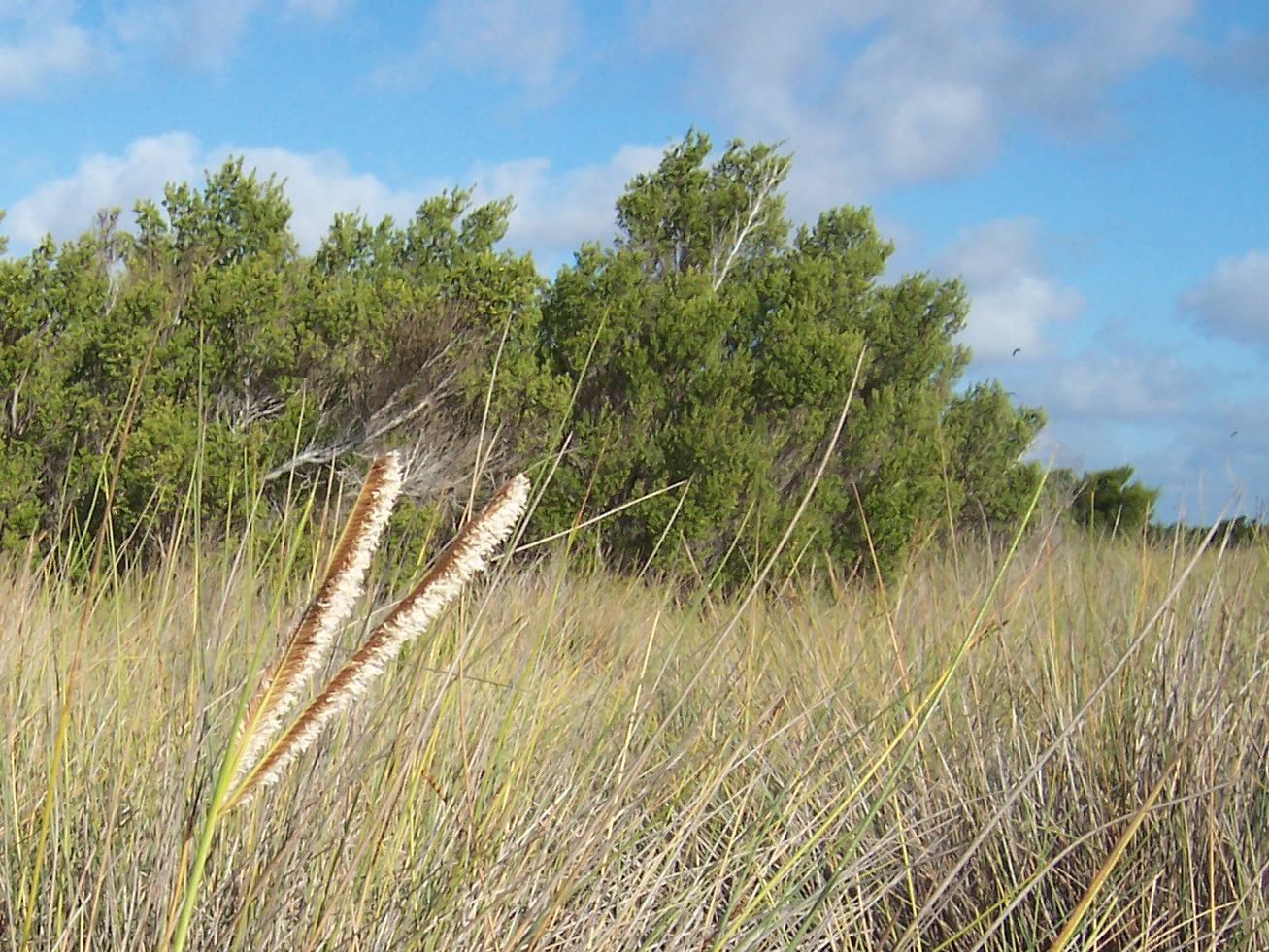
- The grass in the foreground is Sclerodactylon macrostachyum

Scientific classification
- Kingdom: Plantae
- Clade: Tracheophytes
- Clade: Angiosperms
- Clade: Monocots
- Clade: Commelinids
- Order: Poales
- Family: Poaceae
- Subfamily: Chloridoideae
- Tribe: Cynodonteae
- Genus: Sclerodactylon; Stapf
- Species: S. macrostachyum

Binomial name
- Sclerodactylon macrostachyum (Benth.) A.Camus

Synonyms
- Eleusine macrostachya Benth.; Eleusine juncea Bojer; Sclerodactylon juncifolium Stapf (type species of Sclerodactylon)

= Sclerodactylon =

Genus of grasses

Sclerodactylon is a genus of plants in the grass family, native to eastern Africa and to various islands in the Indian Ocean.

Species

The only known species is Sclerodactylon macrostachyum, native to Tanzania, Mozambique, Madagascar, Comoros, Aldabra, Seychelles, and the Andaman & Nicobar Islands.

formerly included

see Acrachne

- Sclerodactylon micrandrum - Acrachne racemosa
