= Schenckochloa =

Scientific classification
- Kingdom: Plantae
- Clade: Tracheophytes
- Clade: Angiosperms
- Clade: Monocots
- Clade: Commelinids
- Order: Poales
- Clade: Graminid clade
- Family: Poaceae
- Genus: Schenckochloa; J.J.Ortíz
- Species: S. barbata

Binomial name
- Schenckochloa barbata (Hack.) J.J.Ortíz

Synonyms
- Species synonymy: Diplachne barbata Hack.; Gouinia barbata (Hack.) Swallen

Species of grasses

Schenckochloa is a monotypic genus of flowering plants belonging to the family Poaceae. It only contains one known species, Schenckochloa barbata (Hack.) J.J.Ortíz

Its native range is north-eastern Brazil.

The genus name of Schenckochloa is in honour of Heinrich Schenck (1860–1927), a German botanist who was a native of Siegen. The Latin specific epithet of barbata is derived from barbatus meaning bearded. Both genus and species were first described and published in Candollea Vol.46 on page 243 in 1991.

The genus is recognized by the United States Department of Agriculture and the Agricultural Research Service, but they do not list any known species and they note that it could be a possible synonym of Gouinia E. Fourn.
