= Elisabeth Julienne Pommereul =

French botanist (1733–1782)

- Born: 5 July 1733
- Died: 3 July 1782 (aged 48)
- Other name: Mme Dugage de Pommereul Elisabeth Dugage de Pommereul Elisabeth-Julienne Pommereul
- Occupation: Botanist
- Employer: André Thouin

Élisabeth Julienne Pommereul (5 July 1733 - 3 July 1782) was a French botanist who worked under the teachings of the French botanist Thouin and Swedish botanist Linnaeus to study classifications and counts of grass types in the Jardin du Roi.

== Early life ==
Born in 1733, Élisabeth Julienne (Mme Dugage de Pommereul) came from the Breton nobility. Her father Guy-René Pommereul, Sieur Des Longrais, was a lawyer in the Parlement of Rennes and Seneschal of Brie and Janzé. Her mother, Louise Thérèse Letort, lady of Navinal, came from the same background. Élisabeth Julienne was the cousin of François-René-Jean de Pommereul (1745-1823), division general during the revolutionary period and prefect under the First Empire. In 1755, she married François-Alexis Fresnel.

== Professional career ==
Élisabeth was introduced to botany in the Rennes region. In the 1770s, she lived in Nantes, where she became acquainted with the family of François Bonamy, director of the Jardin royal des Plantes. A few years later, between 1775 and 1777, Pommereul lived in Paris and assiduously followed the botany courses of Antoine-Laurent de Jussieu. In 1778, André Thouin, head gardener at the Jardin du Roi, called on her help to count and identify the grasses growing in the beds of the Jardin de l'Ecole de botany. It was at this time that she tried to develop a classification reconciling Tournefort's system with that of Linnaeus. During the same period, she was approached by Thouin and Jussieu to compose a work on grasses. Thouin put her in touch with her network of correspondents: Carl von Linné the Younger, Antoine Gouan, Pierre-André Pourret, and Claude-Étienne Savary. According to her relative Desgenettes, she lived alone in an attic in the King's Garden and devoted herself to her research projects. Witnesses to her botanical activity, three botanical specimens that she collected during her herbalism are still preserved in the collections of the National Herbarium of the National Museum of Natural History.

=== Awards and publication ===
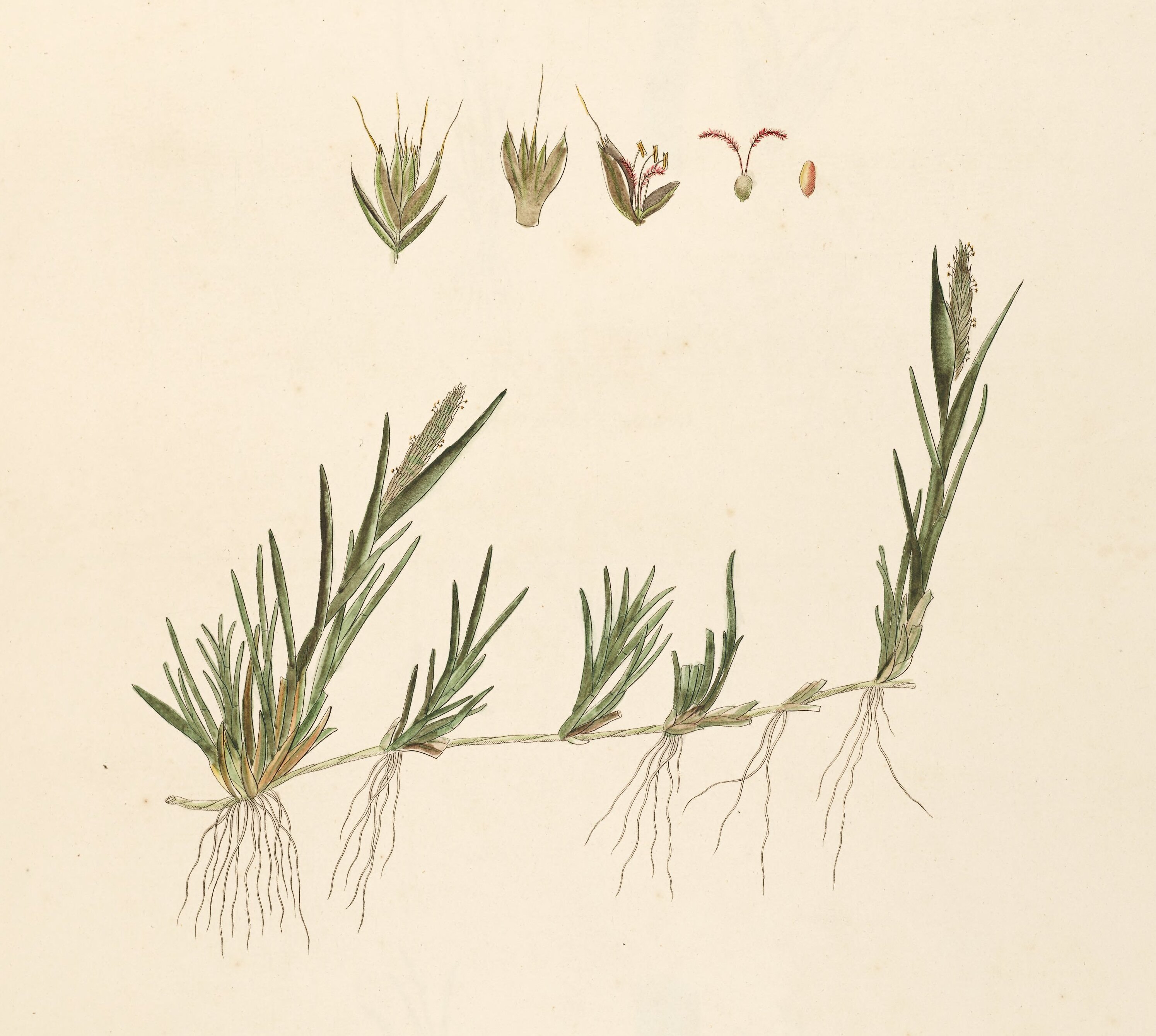
Botanical illustration of Pommereulla cornucopiae

On the announcement of the upcoming publication of Pommereul's work, Linnaeus the Younger congratulated her and named a plant in her honor, Pommereulla cornucopiae l. f. The plant thus named according to the Linnaean nomenclature was inserted into the Linnaean system. Dombey dedicated the Dugagesia margaritifera to her, but the plant had already been named by the Spanish botanists Ruiz and Pavón. The Royal Academy of Medicine in Madrid, on the initiative of Casimiro Gómez Ortega, correspondent of the Royal Academy of Sciences since 1776, awarded her a diploma.

In 1779, the publication of Élisabeth's work was anticipated. Some publications at the time praised her imminent work as evidence for the morality of educating women. The educator Jean Verdier also paid her a strong tribute in the article "botanique", in the Encyclopédie méthodique. Fortunée Briquet assures us in 1804 that Pommereul is indeed the author of a botanical work. On the other hand, Palisot de Beauvois, dictated that the work was never published and that the manuscript appeared to be misplaced. It seems that illness prevented her from completing the planned work.

Mme. Dugage's existence has long been ignored. The absence of a published work and her practice of botany in the direct entourage of Jussieu have until recently aroused indifference and disdain on the part of botanical historians.

== Death ==
Mme. Dugage suffered from breast cancer, which she tried in vain to relieve by affixing magnetic metal plates. She took part in the magnetotherapy experiments of Father Le Noble, then sought the benefits of the climate of the south of France during the winter of 1781. Élisabeth died in Forcalquier on 3 July 1782.
