= Rheochloa =

Scientific classification
- Kingdom: Plantae
- Clade: Tracheophytes
- Clade: Angiosperms
- Clade: Monocots
- Clade: Commelinids
- Order: Poales
- Family: Poaceae
- Subfamily: Chloridoideae
- Tribe: Cynodonteae
- Subtribe: Eleusininae
- Genus: Rheochloa; Filg., P.M.Peterson & Y.Herrera
- Species: R. scabriflora

Binomial name
- Rheochloa scabriflora Filg., P.M.Peterson & Y.Herrera

Genus of plants

Rheochloa is a monotypic genus of flowering plants belonging to the family Poaceae. The only species is Rheochloa scabriflora. It is a perennial grass native to Brazil.
