= Vietnamochloa =

Scientific classification
- Kingdom: Plantae
- Clade: Tracheophytes
- Clade: Angiosperms
- Clade: Monocots
- Clade: Commelinids
- Order: Poales
- Family: Poaceae
- Subfamily: Chloridoideae
- Tribe: Cynodonteae
- Genus: Vietnamochloa; Veldkamp & R.Nowack
- Species: V. aurea

Binomial name
- Vietnamochloa aurea Veldkamp & R.Nowack

Genus of grasses

Vietnamochloa is a genus of plants in the grass family. The only known species is Vietnamochloa aurea, found only in Vietnam.
