= Lepturidium =

Scientific classification
- Kingdom: Plantae
- Clade: Tracheophytes
- Clade: Angiosperms
- Clade: Monocots
- Clade: Commelinids
- Order: Poales
- Family: Poaceae
- Subfamily: Chloridoideae
- Tribe: Cynodonteae
- Genus: Lepturidium; Hitchc. & Ekman
- Species: L. insulare

Binomial name
- Lepturidium insulare Hitchc. & Ekman

Genus of grasses

Lepturidium is a genus of Cuban plants in the grass family.

The only known species is Lepturidium insulare. It is reported only from Isla de la Juventud (formerly called Isle of Pines), part of the Republic of Cuba.
