= Neostapfiella =

Scientific classification
- Kingdom: Plantae
- Clade: Tracheophytes
- Clade: Angiosperms
- Clade: Monocots
- Clade: Commelinids
- Order: Poales
- Family: Poaceae
- Subfamily: Chloridoideae
- Tribe: Cynodonteae
- Subtribe: Eleusininae
- Genus: Neostapfiella; A.Camus

Type species
- Neostapfiella perrieri A.Camus

Genus of grasses

Neostapfiella is a genus of Madagascan plants in the grass family.

Species

- Neostapfiella chloridiantha A.Camus
- Neostapfiella humbertiana A.Camus
- Neostapfiella perrieri A.Camus
