= Orinus =

Scientific classification
- Kingdom: Plantae
- Clade: Embryophytes
- Clade: Tracheophytes
- Clade: Angiosperms
- Clade: Monocots
- Clade: Commelinids
- Order: Poales
- Family: Poaceae
- Subfamily: Chloridoideae
- Tribe: Cynodonteae
- Subtribe: Orininae
- Genus: Orinus; Hitchc.

Type species
- Orinus arenicola (syn of O. thoroldii) Hitchc.

Genus of grasses

Orinus is a genus of Asian plants in the grass family. The genome of O. kokonorica has been sequenced.

Species

- Orinus alticulmus L.B.Cai & Tong L.Zhang - Qinghai
- Orinus anomala Keng f. - Qinghai, Sichuan
- Orinus kokonorica (K.S.Hao) Keng - Gansu, Qinghai
- Orinus longiglumis X.Su & L.B.Cai - Tibet
- Orinus thoroldii (Stapf ex Hemsl.) Bor - Qinghai, Xinjiang, Tibet, Kashmir, Nepal, Uttarakhand, Kazakhstan, Kyrgyzstan, Uttar Pradesh
- Orinus tibeticus N.X.Zhao - Tibet
