= Austrochloris =

Scientific classification
- Kingdom: Plantae
- Clade: Tracheophytes
- Clade: Angiosperms
- Clade: Monocots
- Clade: Commelinids
- Order: Poales
- Family: Poaceae
- Subfamily: Chloridoideae
- Tribe: Cynodonteae
- Subtribe: Eleusininae
- Genus: Austrochloris; Lazarides
- Species: A. dichanthioides

Binomial name
- Austrochloris dichanthioides (Everist) Lazarides

Synonyms
- Chloris dichanthioides Everist

Genus of grasses

Austrochloris is a genus of Australian plants in the grass family. The only known species is Austrochloris dichanthioides, found only in the State of Queensland.

== See also ==
- List of Poaceae genera
