= Farrago racemosa =

Scientific classification
- Kingdom: Plantae
- Clade: Tracheophytes
- Clade: Angiosperms
- Clade: Monocots
- Clade: Commelinids
- Order: Poales
- Family: Poaceae
- Subfamily: Chloridoideae
- Tribe: Cynodonteae
- Subtribe: Farragininae
- Genus: Farrago; Clayton
- Species: F. racemosa

Binomial name
- Farrago racemosa Clayton

Species of grass

Farrago is a genus of African plants in the grass family.

The only known species is Farrago racemosa, native to the Lindi Region of southeastern Tanzania.
