= Neobouteloua =

Scientific classification
- Kingdom: Plantae
- Clade: Embryophytes
- Clade: Tracheophytes
- Clade: Spermatophytes
- Clade: Angiosperms
- Clade: Monocots
- Clade: Commelinids
- Order: Poales
- Family: Poaceae
- Subfamily: Chloridoideae
- Tribe: Cynodonteae
- Subtribe: Dactylocteniinae
- Genus: Neobouteloua; Gould

Type species
- Neobouteloua lophostachya (Griseb.) Gould

Genus of grasses

Neobouteloua is a genus of Argentine and Chilean plants in the grass family.

Species

- Neobouteloua lophostachya (Griseb.) Gould - Chile, Argentina (Catamarca, Córdoba, Salta, Tucumán, La Rioja, San Luis, Mendoza, Santiago del Estero)
- Neobouteloua pauciracemosa M.G.López & Biurrun - Argentina (La Rioja, San Luis)
