= Gouinia =

Scientific classification
- Kingdom: Plantae
- Clade: Tracheophytes
- Clade: Angiosperms
- Clade: Monocots
- Clade: Commelinids
- Order: Poales
- Family: Poaceae
- Subfamily: Chloridoideae
- Tribe: Cynodonteae
- Subtribe: Gouiniinae
- Genus: Gouinia; E.Fourn. ex Benth. & Hook.f. 1883

Type species
- Gouinia polygama (syn of G. virgata) E.Fourn.

Synonyms
- Pogochloa S.Moore; Schenckochloa J.J.Ortíz

Genus of grasses

Gouinia is a genus of Latin American plants in the grass family.

Species

- Gouinia barbata (Hack.) Swallen - Pernambuco, Paraíba, Rio Grande do Norte
- Gouinia brasiliensis (S.Moore) Swallen - Brazil (Mato Grosso, Mato Grosso do Sul), Bolivia, Paraguay, Argentina (Salta, Chaco)
- Gouinia cearensis (Ekman) Swallen - Ceará, Pernambuco
- Gouinia gracilis Ekman - Cuba
- Gouinia guatemalensis (Hack.) Swallen - Nicaragua, Honduras, Guatemala, Chiapas, Campeche, Yucatán, Oaxaca
- Gouinia isabelensis J.J.Ortíz - Nayarit
- Gouinia latifolia (Griseb.) Vasey - widespread from Oaxaca to Paraguay
- Gouinia mexicana (Scribn.) Vasey - Querétaro, San Luis Potosí
- Gouinia papillosa Swallen - Yucatán Peninsula, Tamaulipas
- Gouinia paraguayensis (Kuntze) Parodi - Argentina, Paraguay, Bolivia, Peru
- Gouinia tortuosa Swallen - Argentina, Paraguay, Bolivia
- Gouinia virgata (J.Presl) Scribn. - Mexico, Central America, Cuba, Hispaniola, Colombia, Ecuador, Peru

formerly included

see Enteropogon

- Gouinia brandegeei - Enteropogon brandegeei
