= Neesiochloa =

Scientific classification
- Kingdom: Plantae
- Clade: Tracheophytes
- Clade: Angiosperms
- Clade: Monocots
- Clade: Commelinids
- Order: Poales
- Family: Poaceae
- Subfamily: Chloridoideae
- Tribe: Cynodonteae
- Subtribe: Pappophorinae
- Genus: Neesiochloa; Pilg.
- Species: N. barbata

Binomial name
- Neesiochloa barbata (Nees) Pilg.

Synonyms
- Calotheca barbata Nees; Chascolytrum barbatum (Nees) Kunth; Briza barbata Trin.; Briza berteroniana Steud.

Genus of grasses

Neesiochloa is a genus of Brazilian plants in the grass family. The only known species is Neesiochloa barbata. It is native to eastern Brazil (Bahia, Rio Grande do Norte, Ceará, Piauí).

The genus name of Neesiochloa is in honour of Christian Gottfried Daniel Nees von Esenbeck (1776–1858), a prolific German botanist, physician, zoologist, and natural philosopher. The Latin specific epithet of barbata refers to "barba" meaning bearded.
