= Decaryella =

Scientific classification
- Kingdom: Plantae
- Clade: Tracheophytes
- Clade: Angiosperms
- Clade: Monocots
- Clade: Commelinids
- Order: Poales
- Family: Poaceae
- Subfamily: Chloridoideae
- Tribe: Cynodonteae
- Subtribe: Hubbardochloinae
- Genus: Decaryella; A.Camus
- Species: D. madagascariensis

Binomial name
- Decaryella madagascariensis A.Camus

Genus of grasses

Decaryella is a genus of plants in the grass family. The only known species is Decaryella madagascariensis, native to Madagascar.
