= Tremophora guttulosa =

Scientific classification
- Domain: Eukaryota
- Kingdom: Animalia
- Phylum: Arthropoda
- Class: Insecta
- Order: Lepidoptera
- Family: Tortricidae
- Genus: Tremophora
- Species: T. guttulosa

Binomial name
- Tremophora guttulosa Diakonoff, 1953

Species of moth

Tremophora guttulosa is a species of moth of the family Tortricidae. It is found on New Guinea.
