= Orthacanthus pedunculatus =

Conservation status
- Least Concern (IUCN 3.1)

Scientific classification
- Kingdom: Plantae
- Clade: Tracheophytes
- Clade: Angiosperms
- Clade: Monocots
- Clade: Commelinids
- Order: Poales
- Family: Poaceae
- Subfamily: Chloridoideae
- Tribe: Cynodonteae
- Subtribe: Traginae
- Genus: Orthacanthus; P.M.Peterson & Romasch.
- Species: O. pedunculatus

Binomial name
- Orthacanthus pedunculatus (Pilg.) P.M.Peterson & Romasch.

Synonyms
- Tragus pedunculatus Pilg.

Species of grass

Orthacanthus pedunculatus is a species of grass native to Botswana and Namibia in southern Africa. It is the sole species in genus Orthacanthus.

It is an annual growing up to 20 cm tall, with an erect or ascending habit. It grows in the semi-arid Kalahari Acacia–Baikiaea woodlands, and is common in the Grootfontein and Simkue areas of northern Namibia. It typically grows on shallow sand over limestone outcrops, on compacted bare ground, and on calcrete pan margins, where it often forms mats.

The species was first described as Tragus pedunculatus by Robert Knud Friedrich Pilger in 1910. In 2016 Paul M. Peterson and Konstantyn Romaschenko placed it in a new monotypic genus Orthacanthus as Orthancanthus pedunculatus.
