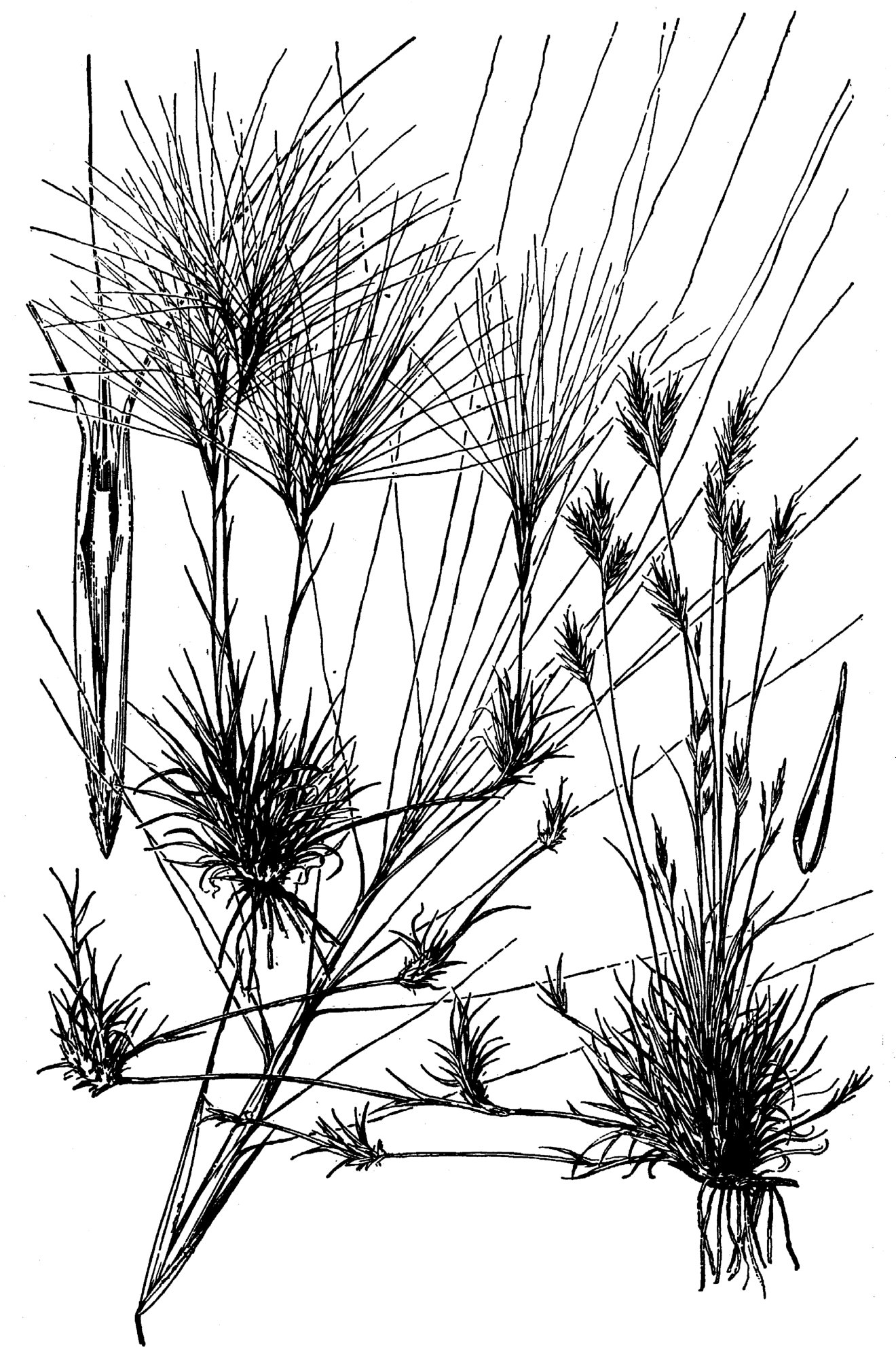

Scientific classification
- Kingdom: Plantae
- Clade: Tracheophytes
- Clade: Angiosperms
- Clade: Monocots
- Clade: Commelinids
- Order: Poales
- Family: Poaceae
- Subfamily: Chloridoideae
- Tribe: Cynodonteae
- Subtribe: Scleropogoninae
- Genus: Scleropogon; Phil.
- Species: S. brevifolius

Binomial name
- Scleropogon brevifolius Phil.

Synonyms
- Genus synonymy: Lesourdia E.Fourn.; Species synonymy: Festuca macrostachya Torr. & A.Gray; Lesourdia karwinskyana E.Fourn.; Lesourdia multiflora E.Fourn.; Scleropogon karwinskyanus (E.Fourn.) Benth. ex S.Watson; Scleropogon longisetus Beetle; Tricuspis monstra Munro ex Hemsl.

= Scleropogon brevifolius =

Species of grass

Scleropogon is a monotypic genus of grass which includes the sole species Scleropogon brevifolius, or burrograss. This grass is found in two areas of the world, in North America from the southwestern United States to central Mexico and in South America in Chile and Argentina. This is a perennial mat-forming grass with sharp, tufted leaves and firm awns. This grass may be dioecious, with staminate and pistillate plants growing in separate colonies.
