= Willkommia =

Scientific classification
- Kingdom: Plantae
- Clade: Tracheophytes
- Clade: Angiosperms
- Clade: Monocots
- Clade: Commelinids
- Order: Poales
- Family: Poaceae
- Subfamily: Chloridoideae
- Tribe: Cynodonteae
- Subtribe: Traginae
- Genus: Willkommia; Hack.

Type species
- Willkommia sarmentosa Hack.

Synonyms
- Willbleibia Herter

Genus of grasses

Willkommia is a genus of plants in the grass family. The genus has a disjunct distribution, with species native to Southern Africa, South America, and the United States.

== Species ==
Accepted species

- Willkommia annua Hack. - Angola, Namibia
- Willkommia newtonii Hack. - Angola, Namibia
- Willkommia sarmentosa Hack. - Angola, Namibia, Zambia, Zimbabwe, Botswana, Cape Province, KwaZulu-Natal
- Willkommia texana Hitchc. - United States (Texas, Oklahoma), Argentina, Uruguay
