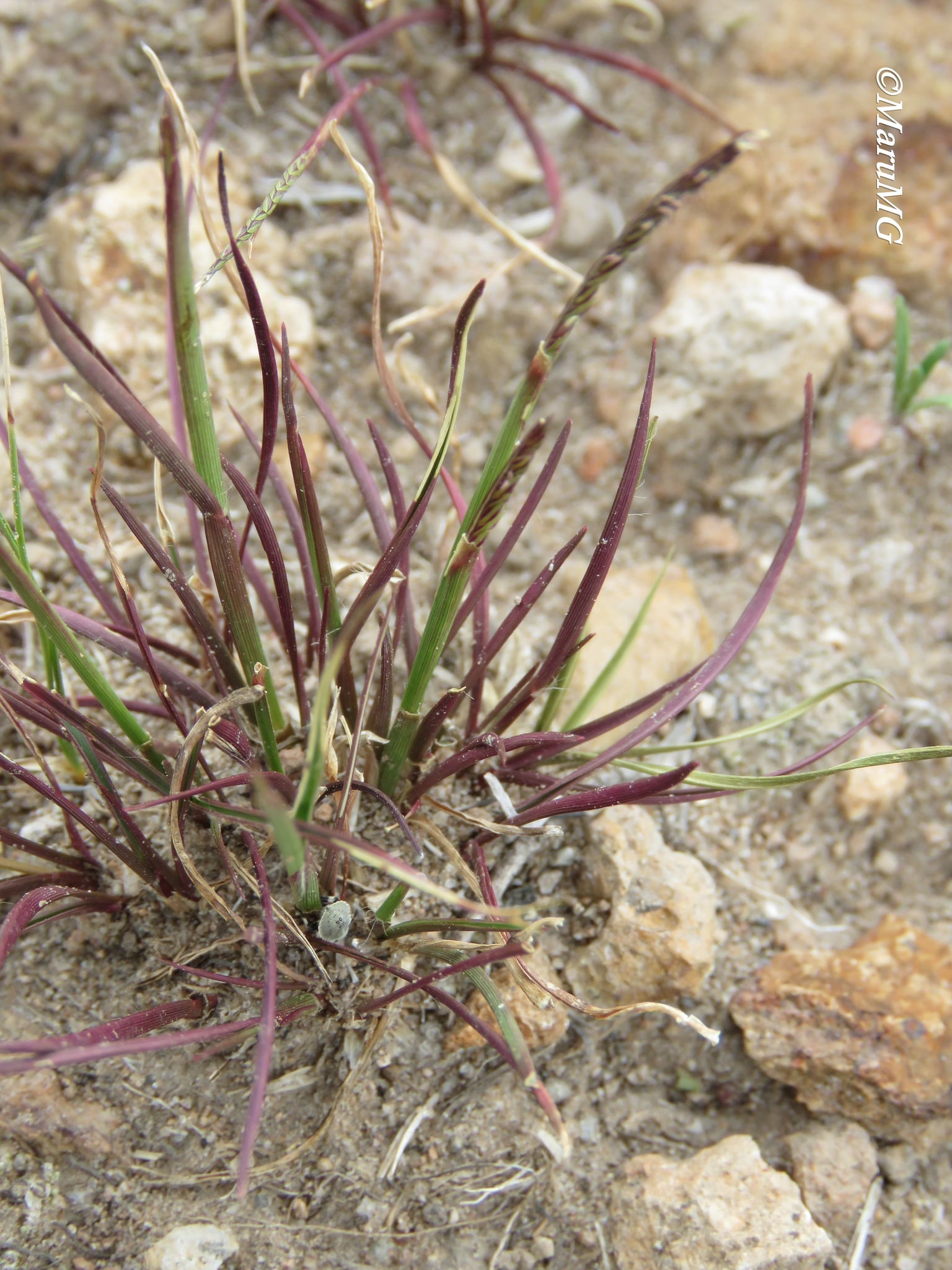
- Microchloa kunthii

Scientific classification
- Kingdom: Plantae
- Clade: Tracheophytes
- Clade: Angiosperms
- Clade: Monocots
- Clade: Commelinids
- Order: Poales
- Family: Poaceae
- Subfamily: Chloridoideae
- Tribe: Cynodonteae
- Subtribe: Eleusininae
- Genus: Microchloa; R.Br.

Type species
- Rottboellia setacea (syn of M. indica) Roxb.

Synonyms
- Rendlia Chiov.

= Microchloa =

Genus of grasses

Microchloa, or smallgrass, is a genus of tropical and subtropical plants in the grass family, native to Africa, southern Asia, northern Australia, and the warmer parts of the Western Hemisphere.

Species

- Microchloa afra Nees - central and southern Africa
- Microchloa altera (Rendle) Stapf - central + southern Africa
- Microchloa annua (Kupicha & Cope) Cope - Zambia
- Microchloa ensifolia Rendle - Angola
- Microchloa indica (L.f.) P.Beauv. - tropical Africa, southern China, Indian subcontinent, Indochina, Java, Philippines, Northern Territory of Australia
- Microchloa kunthii Desv. - Africa, southern Asia (Yemen to Vietnam), southwestern USA (Arizona, Texas), Mexico, Central America, South America (Argentina, Chile, Bolivia, Peru, Ecuador, Colombia)

Formerly included

- Microchloa ciliaris - Cynodon simonii
- Microchloa convergens - Cynodon convergens
- Microchloa fibrosa - Micrachne fulva
- Microchloa fulva - Micrachne fulva
- Microchloa obtusiflora - Micrachne obtusiflora
- Microchloa patentiflora - Micrachne patentiflora
- Microchloa tenella - Cynodon tenellus
