= Trigonochloa =

Scientific classification
- Kingdom: Plantae
- Clade: Tracheophytes
- Clade: Angiosperms
- Clade: Monocots
- Clade: Commelinids
- Order: Poales
- Family: Poaceae
- Subfamily: Chloridoideae
- Tribe: Cynodonteae
- Subtribe: Perotidinae
- Genus: Trigonochloa; P.M.Peterson & N.Snow

Genus of grasses

Trigonochloa is a genus of Asian and African plants in the grass family.

Species

- Trigonochloa rupestris (C.E.Hubb.) P.M.Peterson & N.Snow - Ethiopia, Eritrea, Somalia, Kenya, Uganda, Yemen
- Trigonochloa uniflora (Hochst. ex A.Rich.) P.M.Peterson & N.Snow - Ghana, Benin, Nigeria, West Congo, Uganda, Kenya, Tanzania, Ethiopia, Mozambique, Angola, Zambia, Zimbabwe, Botswana, Namibia, South Africa, Yemen, India, Sri Lanka
