= Zaqiqah =

Scientific classification
- Kingdom: Plantae
- Clade: Tracheophytes
- Clade: Angiosperms
- Clade: Monocots
- Clade: Commelinids
- Order: Poales
- Family: Poaceae
- Genus: Zaqiqah; P.M.Peterson & Romasch.
- Species: Z. mucronata

Binomial name
- Zaqiqah mucronata (Forssk.) P.M.Peterson & Romasch.

Synonyms
- Aeluropus arabicus (Spreng.) Steud.; Aeluropus mucronatus (Forssk.) Asch.; Aeluropus pungens (Vahl) Boiss.; Calotheca arabica Spreng.; Dactylis mucronata (Forssk.) Steud.; Diplachne mucronata (Forssk.) Hack. ex Schinz; Festuca mucronata Forssk. (1775) (basionym); Festuca pungens Vahl; Odyssea mucronata (Forssk.) Stapf; Uralepis pungens Kunth

Genus of flowering plants

Zaqiqah is a genus of flowering plants belonging to the family Poaceae. It contains a single species, Zaqiqah mucronata, which is native to Eritrea, Somalia, and the Southwestern Arabian Peninsula (Yemen).
