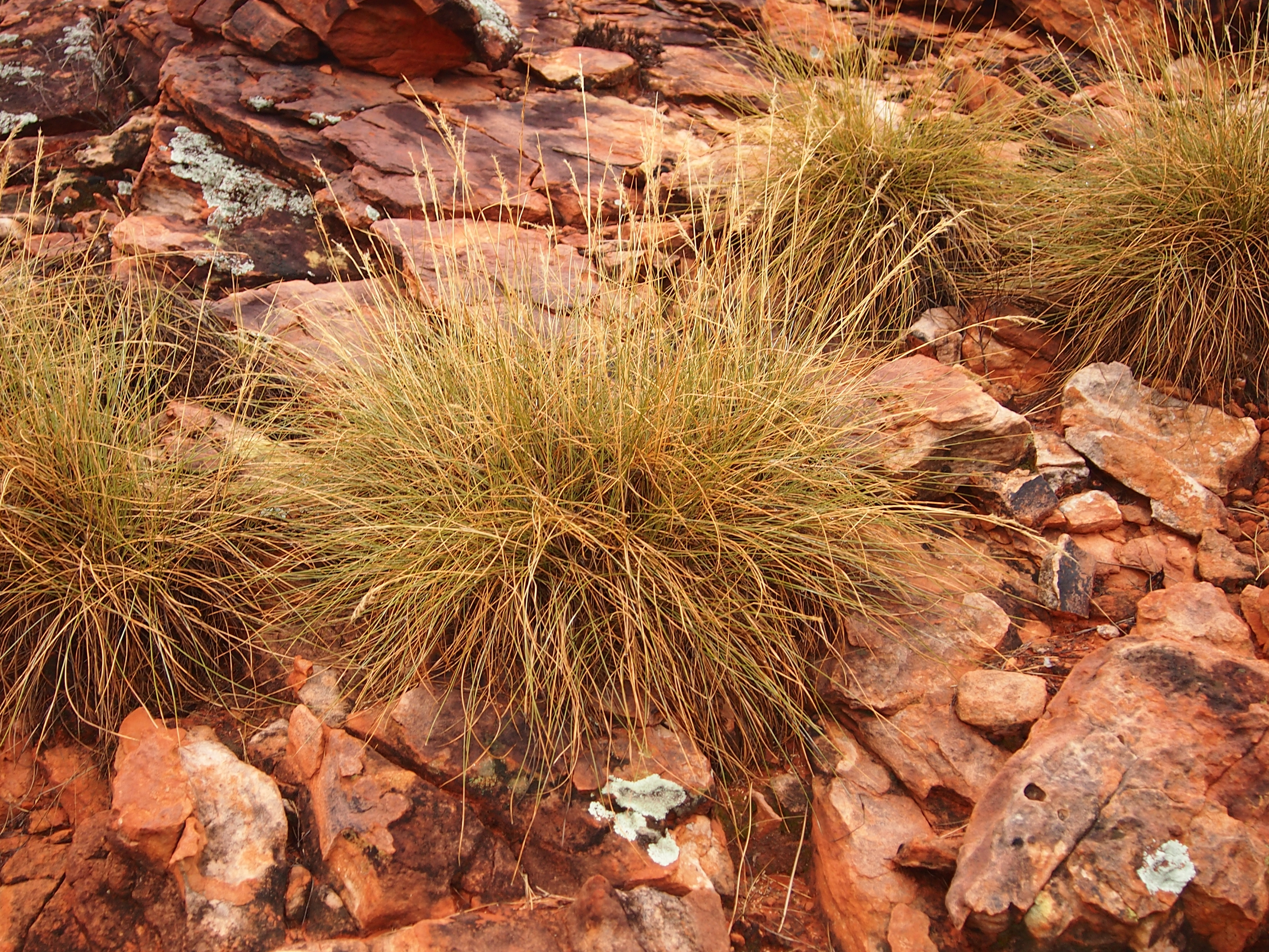
- Triodia melvillei

Scientific classification
- Kingdom: Plantae
- Clade: Embryophytes
- Clade: Tracheophytes
- Clade: Spermatophytes
- Clade: Angiosperms
- Clade: Monocots
- Clade: Commelinids
- Order: Poales
- Family: Poaceae
- Subfamily: Chloridoideae
- Tribe: Cynodonteae
- Subtribe: Triodiinae

Genera
- Monodia; Plectrachne; Symplectrodia; Triodia

= Triodiinae =

Subtribe of grass-like plants

Triodiinae is a subtribe of grasses plants in the tribe Cynodonteae.
