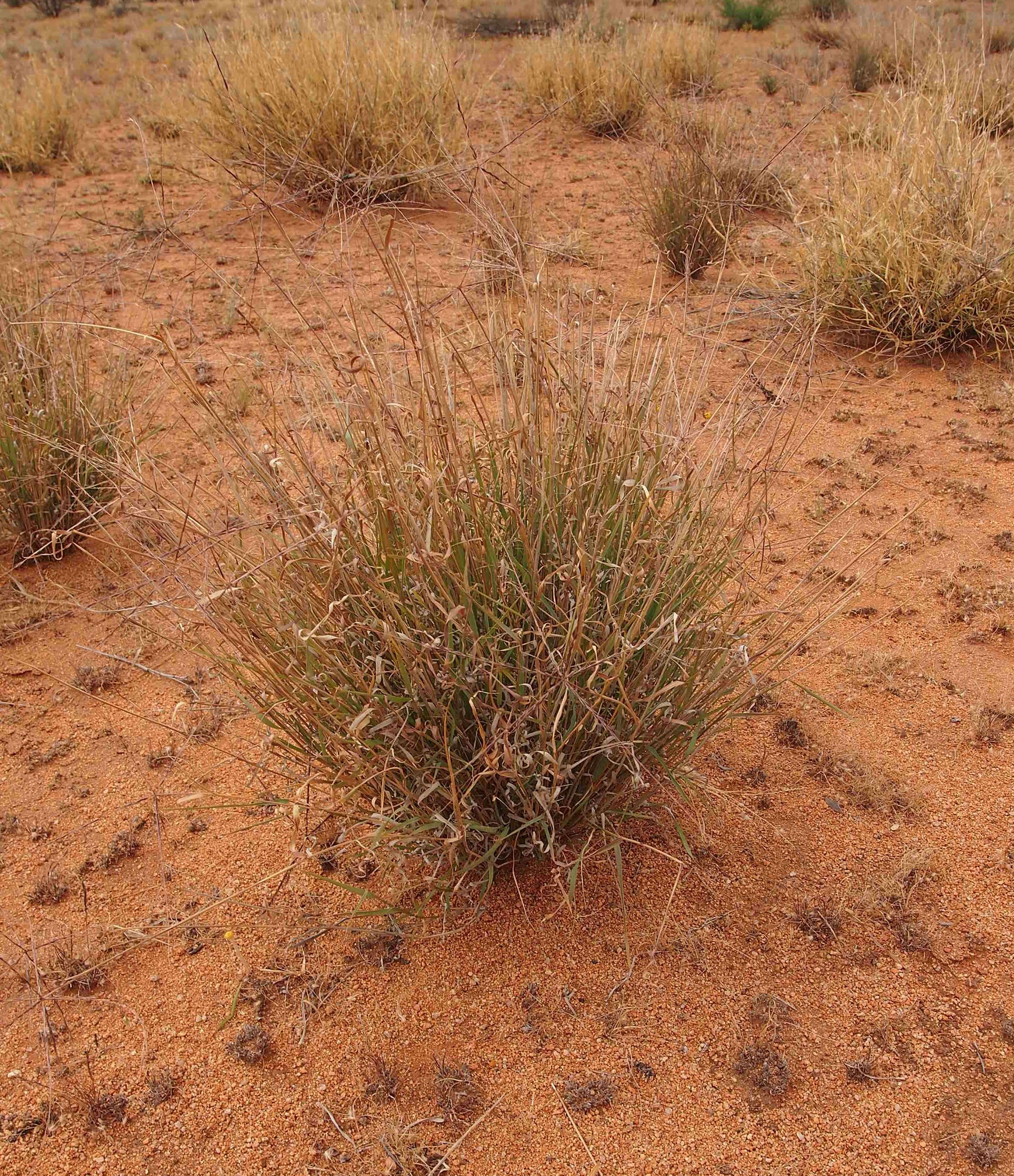
- Enteropogon ramosus

Scientific classification
- Kingdom: Plantae
- Clade: Tracheophytes
- Clade: Angiosperms
- Clade: Monocots
- Clade: Commelinids
- Order: Poales
- Family: Poaceae
- Subfamily: Chloridoideae
- Tribe: Cynodonteae
- Subtribe: Eleusininae
- Genus: Enteropogon; Nees

Type species
- Enteropogon melicoides (Willd.) Nees

= Enteropogon =

Genus of grasses

Enteropogon is a genus of tropical and subtropical plants in the grass family. It is widespread across many parts of Asia, Africa, Australia, the Americas, and various islands.

Species

- Enteropogon acicularis (Lindl.) Lazarides - curly windmill grass, large windmill grass, umbrella grass - Australia
- Enteropogon barbatus C.E.Hubb. - Ethiopia, Somalia, Kenya
- Enteropogon brandegeei (Vasey) Clayton - Baja California, Baja California Sur
- Enteropogon chlorideus (Presl) Clayton - buryseed umbrella grass, verdillo cacahuatoide - Arizona, Texas, Mesoamerica
- Enteropogon coimbatorensis K.K.N.Nair, S.K.Jain & M.P.Nayar - India
- Enteropogon dolichostachyus (Lag.) Keng - Yemen, Oman, Afghanistan, Indian subcontinent, Indochina, southern China, Philippines, Malaysia, Indonesia, New Guinea, northern Australia, Micronesia
- Enteropogon longiaristatus (Napper) Clayton - Tanzania
- Enteropogon macrostachyus Munro ex Benth. - bushrye - Zimbabwe, Mozambique, Limpopo, Mpumalanga, Gauteng, North West Province
- Enteropogon minutus Lazarides - northern Australia
- Enteropogon mollis (Nees) Clayton - Central America, West Indies, northern South America, Galápagos
- Enteropogon monostachyus Schum. - Somalia, Tanzania, Mozambique, Zambia, Eswatini, KwaZulu-Natal, Mpumalanga, Limpopo, India, Sri Lanka, Myanmar
- Enteropogon paucispiceus (Lazarides) B.K.Simon - Queensland
- Enteropogon prieurii (Kunth) Clayton - drier parts of Africa; Saudi Arabia, Yemen, India
- Enteropogon ramosus B.K.Simon - tussock umbrella grass - Australia
- Enteropogon rupestris (J.A.Schmidt) A.Chev. - drier parts of Africa
- Enteropogon seychellarum Benth. - Somalia, Kenya, Tanzania, Mozambique, Zambia, Madagascar, Seychelles, Aldabra
- Enteropogon unispiceus (F.Muell.) Clayton - Taiwan, Queensland, New South Wales, Cook Islands

formerly included

see Microchloa

- Enteropogon muticus - Microchloa altera
