= Melanocenchris =

Scientific classification
- Kingdom: Plantae
- Clade: Tracheophytes
- Clade: Angiosperms
- Clade: Monocots
- Clade: Commelinids
- Order: Poales
- Family: Poaceae
- Subfamily: Chloridoideae
- Tribe: Cynodonteae
- Subtribe: Tripogoninae
- Genus: Melanocenchris; Nees

Synonyms
- Gracilea J.Koenig ex Hook.f.; Ptiloneilema Steud.

Genus of grasses

Melanocenchris is a genus of Asian and African plants in the grass family.

Species

- Melanocenchris abyssinica (R.Br. ex Fresen.) Hochst. - Chad, Sudan, Egypt, Eritrea, Ethiopia, Somalia, Saudi Arabia, Oman, Persian Gulf Sheikdoms, Iran, Pakistan, India
- Melanocenchris jacquemontii Jaub. & Spach - India, Pakistan, Bangladesh, Iraq, Socotra
- Melanocenchris monoica (Rottler) C.E.C.Fisch. - India, Sri Lanka
