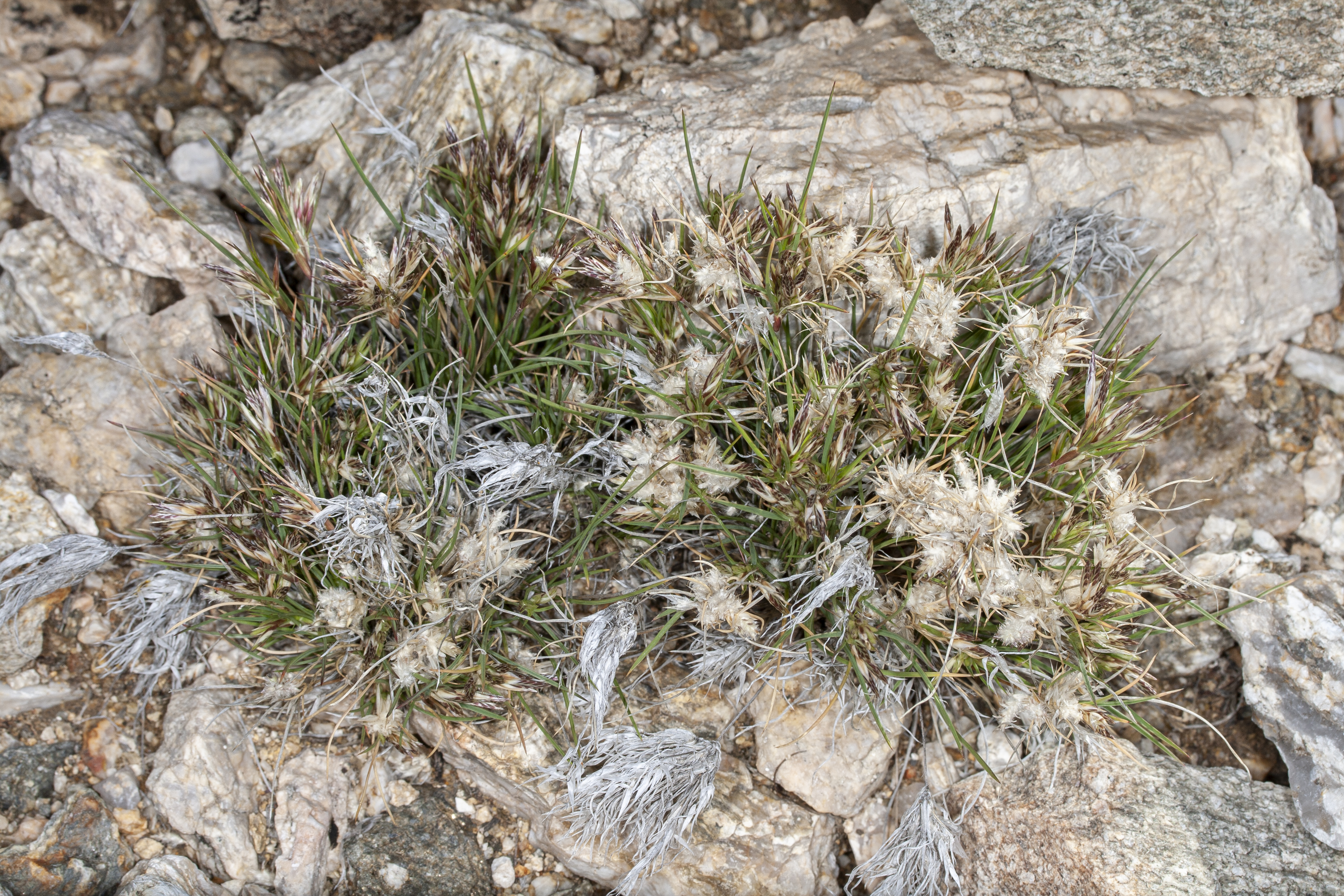

Conservation status
- Secure (NatureServe)

Scientific classification
- Kingdom: Plantae
- Clade: Tracheophytes
- Clade: Angiosperms
- Clade: Monocots
- Clade: Commelinids
- Order: Poales
- Family: Poaceae
- Subfamily: Chloridoideae
- Genus: Munroa
- Species: M. pulchella

Binomial name
- Munroa pulchella (Kunth) Amarilla

Synonyms
- Erioneuron pulchellum Tridens pulchellus Triodia pulchella Dasyochloa pulchella

= Munroa pulchella =

Genus of flowering plants

Munroa pulchella is a species of grass, formerly in the monotypic genus Dasyochloa. (formerly Erioneuron pulchellum), also known as desert fluff-grass or low woollygrass. It is a densely tufted perennial grass found in the deserts of the southwestern United States and northern Mexico.

== Description ==
It is a perennial bunchgrass forming small tufts just a few centimetres high with clumps of short, sharp-pointed leaves. The tufts are often enveloped in masses of cottony fibers; these are actually hairlike strands of excreted and evaporated mineral salts.

The leaves produce soft, cob-webby hairs that dissolve in water, after summer rains. The hairs are typically not present in spring. Numerous hairless, wiry, stems are 5–13 centimetres (2–5 in) tall.

The hairy inflorescence is a spikelet on the end of the stem, surrounded by a bundle of bractlike leaves, and is 6–12 cm (2 1/2–4 1/2 in) long. The spikelets are pale in color, sometimes striped with red, purple, or green. It blooms from February to May.

== Distribution and habitat ==
It is native to the Southwestern United States, California, and northern to central Mexico, where it grows in dry regions such as deserts.
