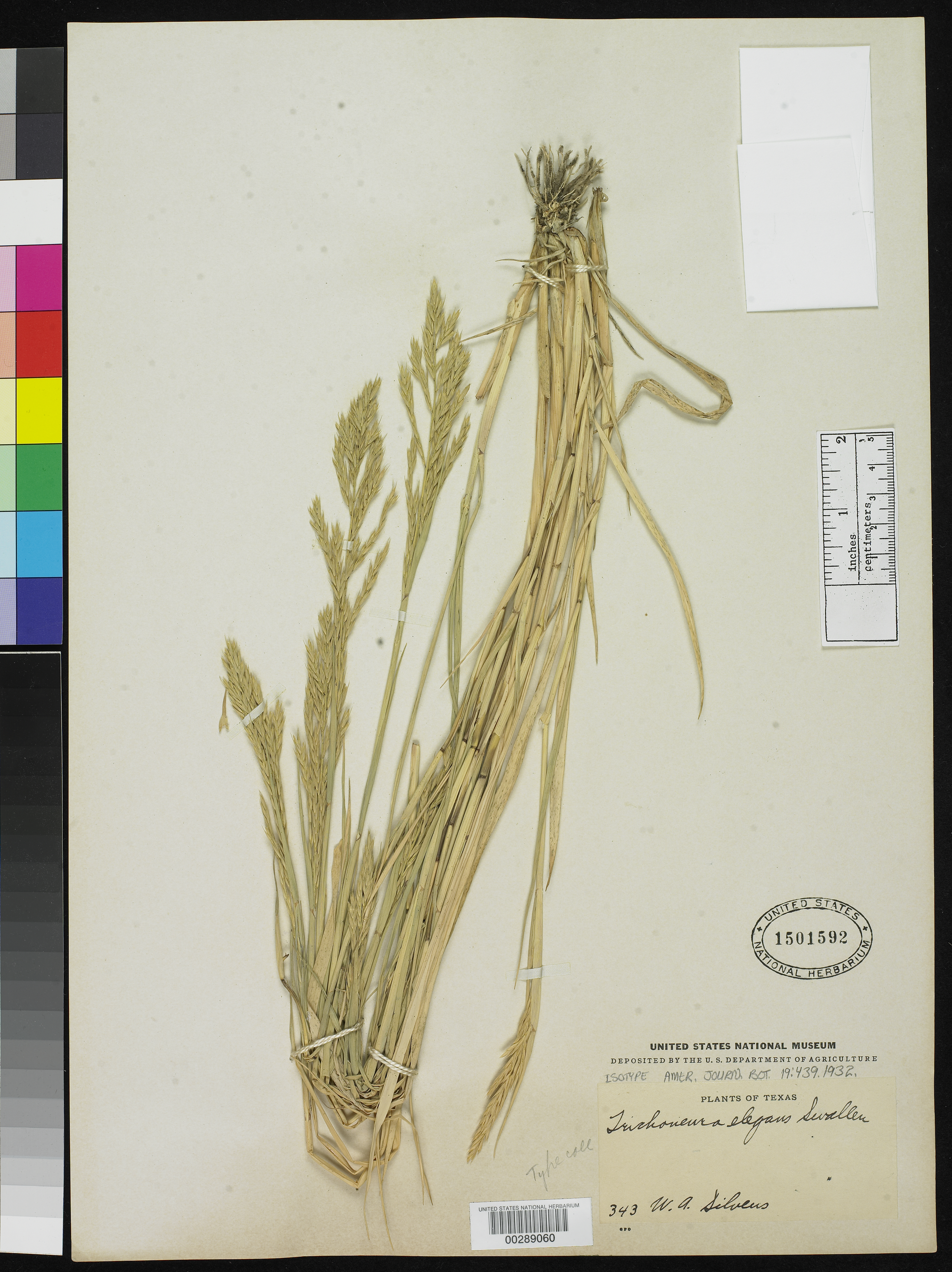
- Trichoneura elegans

Scientific classification
- Kingdom: Plantae
- Clade: Tracheophytes
- Clade: Angiosperms
- Clade: Monocots
- Clade: Commelinids
- Order: Poales
- Family: Poaceae
- Subfamily: Chloridoideae
- Tribe: Cynodonteae
- Subtribe: Trichoneurinae; P.M.Peterson, Romasch. & Y.Herrera
- Genus: Trichoneura; Andersson

Type species
- Trichoneura hookeri (syn of T. lindleyana) Andersson

Synonyms
- Crossotropis Stapf

= Trichoneura (plant) =

Genus of grasses

Trichoneura is a genus of plants in the grass family. It has a scattered distribution in Africa, the Arabian Peninsula, and the Americas.

Species

- Trichoneura ciliata (Peter) S.M.Phillips - Ethiopia, Kenya, Tanzania
- Trichoneura elegans Swallen - Texas, Tamaulipas
- Trichoneura eleusinoides (Rendle) Ekman - Angola, Namibia
- Trichoneura grandiglumis (Nees) Ekman - Ethiopia, Tanzania, Zambia, Angola, Mozambique, Zimbabwe, Botswana, Cape Province, Namibia, Lesotho, KwaZulu-Natal, Eswatini, Free State, Gauteng, Mpumalanga, Limpopo
- Trichoneura lindleyana (Kunth) Ekman - Galápagos
- Trichoneura mollis (Kunth) Ekman - Sahara and Arabian Peninsula from Mali to Egypt and Oman
- Trichoneura schlechteri Ekman - Mozambique, Limpopo
- Trichoneura weberbaueri Pilg. - Chile, Peru
