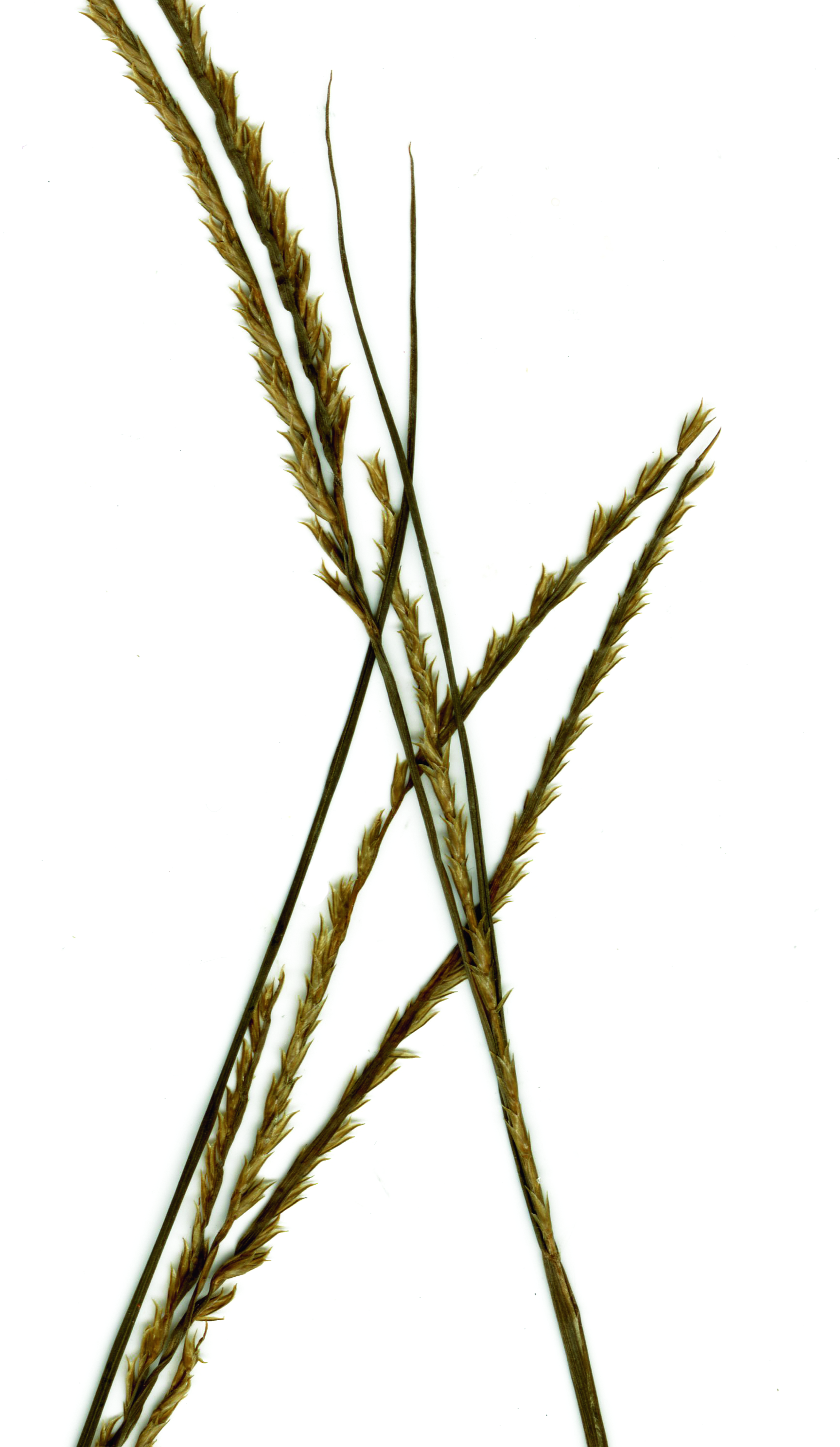
- Acrachne perrieri

Scientific classification
- Kingdom: Plantae
- Clade: Tracheophytes
- Clade: Angiosperms
- Clade: Monocots
- Clade: Commelinids
- Order: Poales
- Family: Poaceae
- Subfamily: Chloridoideae
- Tribe: Cynodonteae
- Subtribe: Dactylocteniinae
- Genus: Acrachne; Wright & Arn. ex Chiov.

Type species
- Acrachne verticillata (syn of A. racemosa) (Roxb.) Lindl. ex Chiov.

Synonyms
- Arthrochloa J.W.Lorch 1960, illegitimate homonym not R. Br. 1823 nor Schult. 1827; Camusia J.W.Lorch; Normanboria Butzin

= Acrachne =

Genus of grasses

Acrachne is a genus of Asian, African, and Australian plants in the grass family. Species in the genus are commonly known as goosegrass.

Species

- Acrachne henrardiana (Bor.) S.M. Phillips – Tamil Nadu
- Acrachne perrieri (A.Camus) S.M. Phillips – Madagascar
- Acrachne racemosa (B.Heyne ex Roem. & Schult) Ohwi – tropical and southern Africa, tropical Asia, northern Australia

formerly included

- See Eragrostis
- Acrachne vatovae – Eragrostis vatovae

== See also ==
- List of Poaceae genera
