= Eugène Pierre Nicolas Fournier =

French botanist (1834-1884)

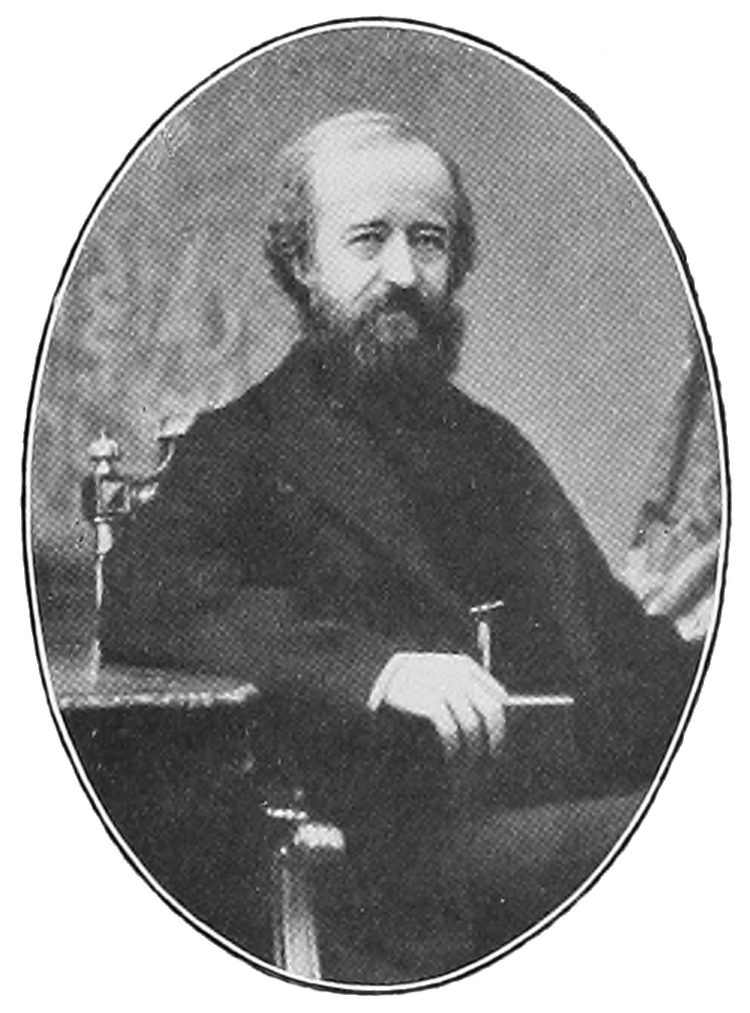
- Born: 15 February 1834; Paris, France
- Died: 10 June 1884 (aged 50); Paris, France
- Scientific career
- Fields: Botany, Pteridology
- Institutions: Société Royale de Botanique de Belgique
- Author abbrev. (botany): E.Fourn.

Eugène Pierre Nicolas Fournier (15 February 1834, Paris – 10 June 1884) was a French botanist. He was particularly interested in ferns. He was a member of the Société Royale de Botanique de Belgique.

The genus Fourniera (family Cyatheaceae) is named in his honor.

== Works ==
- Articles in Bulletin de la Société Botanique de France:
  - Sur la valeur du genre Aconiopteris - 1867, n° 14 - p. 261
  - Sur les hyménophyllées recueillies dans l'Amérique centrale par MM. Ch. Wright, Fendler et Th. Husnot - 1868, n°15 - p. 143
  - Sur les fougères de la Nouvelle-Calédonie - 1869, n°16 - p. 389 à 422
  - Sur deux Pellaea nouveau - 1869, n°16 p. LXVIII
  - Sur deux fougères nouvelles du Nicaragua - 1870, n°17 - p. 236
  - Sur les hyménophyllées recueillies dans l'Amérique centrale par MM. Ch. Wright, Fendler et Th. Husnot - 1872, n°19 - p. 239
  - Sertum Nicaraguense - 1872, n°19 - p. 247
  - Sur le genre Bommeria - 1880, n°27 - p. 327
- With Émile Bescherelle - Mexicanas plantas nuper a collectoribus expeditionis scientificae allatas: aut longis ab annis in herbario musei parisiensis depositas praeside J. Decaisne. Paris - typographeo reipublicae, 1872
- Felices nova-Caledoniae. Enumeratio monographica - Annales des sciences naturelles, 1873, n°18
- Sur les fougères et les lycopodiacées des îles Saint-Paul et Amsterdam - Compte-rendu de la société botanique, 1875, n°81 - p. 1139
- Fougères nouvelles introduites par M. J. Linden - L'illustration horticole, 1876, n°23 - p. 99
- Comptes Rendus - Congrès International de Botanique Horticole, Paris, 1878 - p. 227-252
