= Koldher Fort =

- Part of Ajintha Satmal Hill Range
- Nashik district, Maharashtra

Site information
- Type: Hill fort
- Owner: Government of India
- Controlled by: Maratha Empire (1752-1818); United Kingdom: East India Company (1818-1857); British Raj (1857-1947); India (1947-)
- Open to the public: Yes
- Condition: Ruins

Location
- Shown within Maharashtra
- Coordinates: 20°22′42.5″N 74°10′12.3″E

Site history
- Materials: Stone

Koldher Fort is a fort located 11.26 km (7.00 mi) from chandwad, Nashik district, of Maharashtra. This fort is close to the Rajdher fort and lies westwards. It requires about 1-2 hours to reach the fort from Rajdher.

== History ==
The history of the fort is similar to that of Rajdher fort. Captain Briggs visited this fort after it surrendered to British forces by Maratha Army along with other 17 forts after the fall of Trymbak fort in 1818. Captain Briggs described this fort as a poor stronghold.

== How to reach ==
The nearest town is Chandwad which is 66 km from Nashik. The base village of the fort is Rajdeherwadi which is 11 km from Chandwad. There are good hotels at Chandwad. The trekking path starts from the hillock west of the Rajdeherwadi. The route is very safe and wide. There are no trees on the trekking route. It takes about two hours to reach the ascent of the fort. The path leading to Koldher is southwards from the Rajdher fort.

== Places to see ==
The fort is large but easy to ascent. There is hardly few structures left on the fort. There are good rock-cut granaries and store houses on the fort. There is no water available on the fort.

== See also ==
- List of forts in Maharashtra
- List of forts in India
- Marathi People
- Maratha Navy
- List of Maratha dynasties and states
- Maratha War of Independence
- Battles involving the Maratha Empire
- Maratha Army
- Maratha titles
- Military history of India
