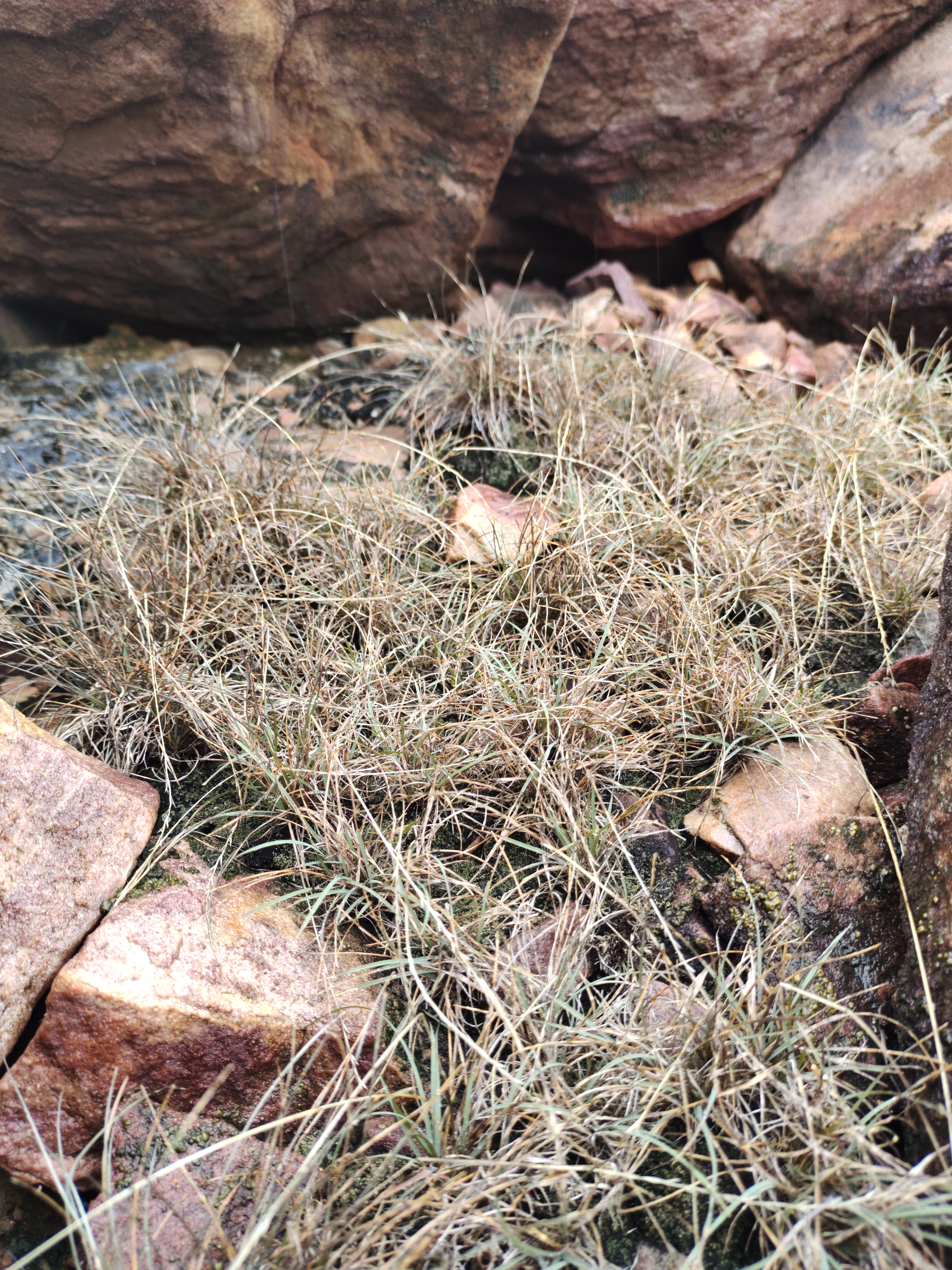
- Tripogon fibrosissimus growing on wet moss associated with Quartzite rocks in Gandikota Hills, Andhra Pradesh, South India.

Scientific classification
- Kingdom: Plantae
- Clade: Tracheophytes
- Clade: Angiosperms
- Clade: Monocots
- Clade: Commelinids
- Order: Poales
- Family: Poaceae
- Subfamily: Chloridoideae
- Tribe: Cynodonteae
- Subtribe: Tripogoninae
- Genus: Tripogon; Roem. & Schult.

Type species
- Tripogon bromoides Roth.

Synonyms
- Arcangelina Kuntze; Kralikia Coss. & Durieu; Plagiolytrum Nees

= Tripogon =

Genus of grasses

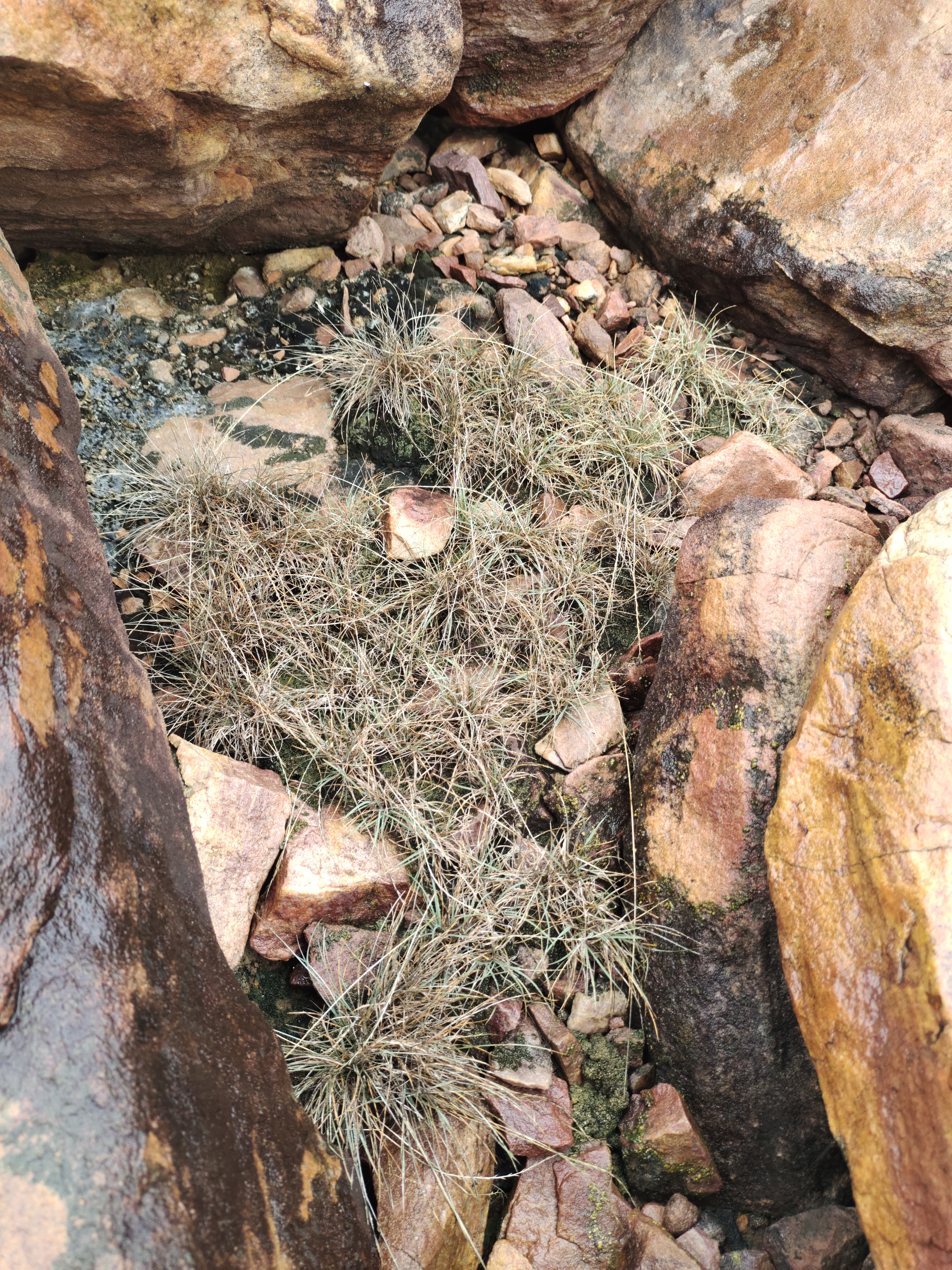
Tripogon fibrosissimus Landge & Manoj Chandran, growing on wet moss substratum in quartzite and sandstone rocks in Gandikota hill, Kadapa district, Andhra Pradesh, India.

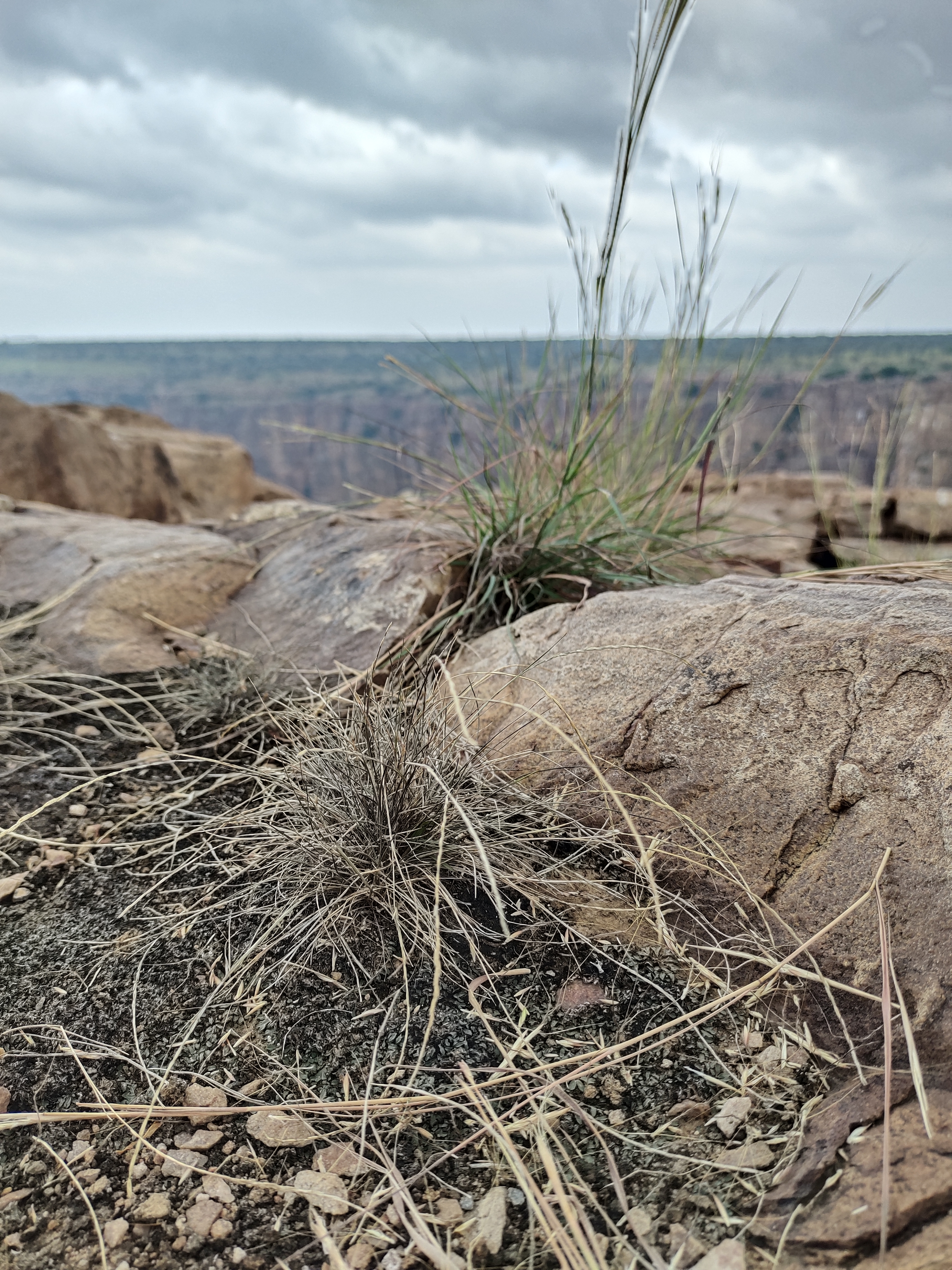
Photographed by: Mr. Shahid Nawaz.

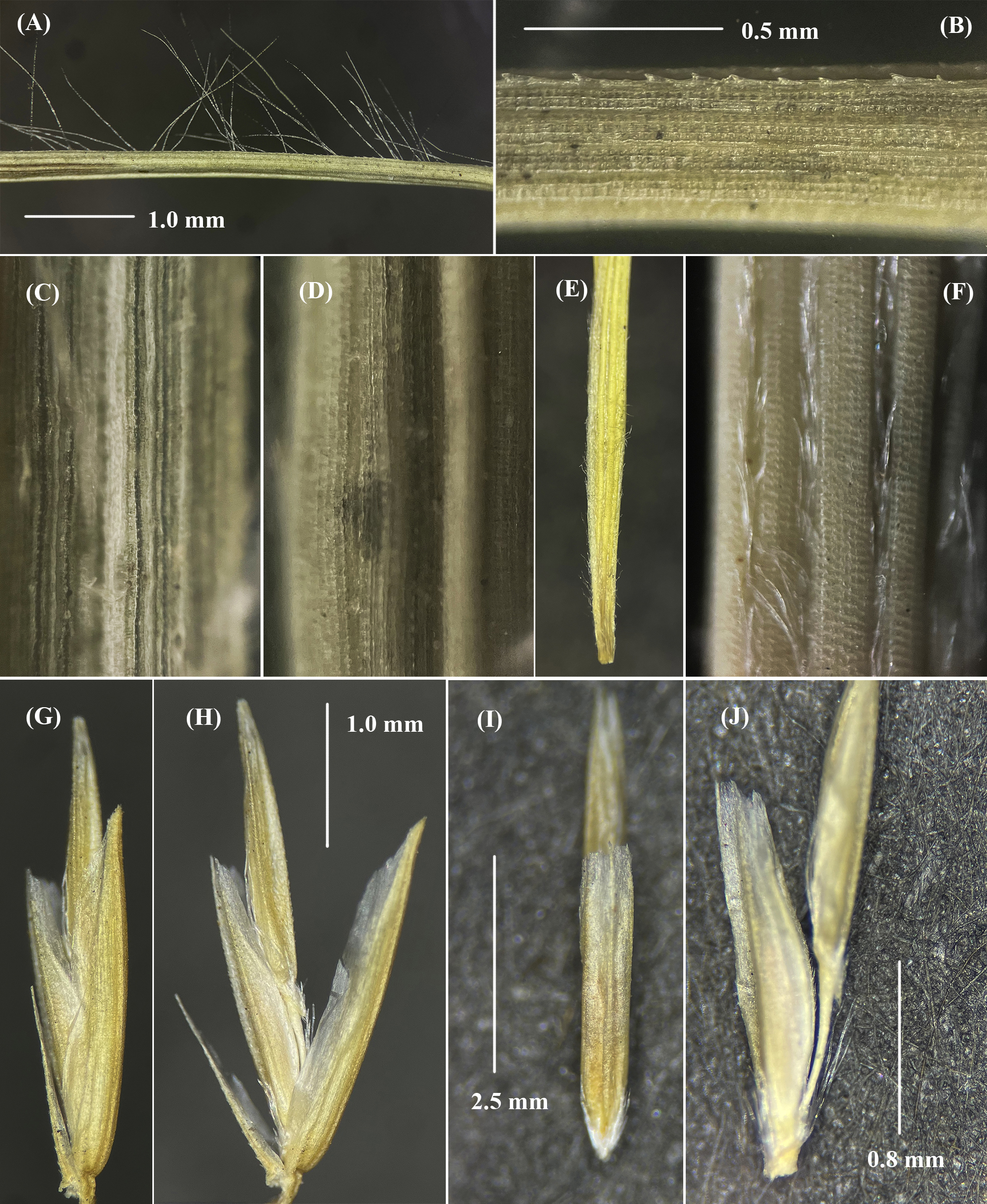
Leaf and spikelet morphology of Tripogon fibrosissimus Landge & M. Chandran. A. Side view of leaf blade showing long trichomes. B. Closeup of leaf blade showing serration of the margin (under a compound microscope). C. Dorsal surface of the leaf blade (under a compound microscope). D. ventral surface of the leaf blade (under a compound microscope) E. Lowest leaf blade showing appressed indumentum between the nerves. F. Closeup of the lowest sheath showing indumentum between the nerves (under a compound microscope). G. Spikelet (closed). H. Spikelet (open). I. Lemma of the lower floret. J. Side view of the florets and rhachilla. (based on the Type specimens housed at BLAT) (© Shahid Nawaz Landge).

Tripogon is a genus of tropical and subtropical plants in the grass family. They are widespread across Asia, Africa, Australia, and the Americas. Fiveminute grass is a common name for plants in this genus.

Recently, a new species Tripogon fibrosissimus Landge & Manoj Chandran was described from Gandikota Hills, a botanically under explored locality in Kadapa district of Andhra Pradesh, South India. The species is characterised by having 2-flowered spikelets and shares morphological similarities with two Afro-Arabian congeners viz., T. africanus (Coss. & Durieu) H. Scholz. & P. Konig and T. oliganthos Cope. It shares striking resemblance with Oropetium roxburghianum (Schult.) S.M. Phillips.

== Species ==
Species include:

- Tripogon africanus - Algeria, Morocco, Tunisia, Djibouti, Oman, Saudi Arabia
- Tripogon anantaswamianus - India
- Tripogon borii - Tamil Nadu
- Tripogon bromoides - Indian Subcontinent, Myanmar
- Tripogon capillatus - Oman, India, Myanmar
- Tripogon chinensis - China, Mongolia, Siberia, Korea, Japan, Vietnam, Philippines
- Tripogon copei - Tamil Nadu
- Tripogon curvatus - Kenya
- Tripogon debilis - Sichuan
- Tripogon ekmanii - Paraguay, Uruguay, Argentina
- Tripogon fibrosissimus - Andhra Pradesh, India
- Tripogon filiformis - China, Indian Subcontinent, southeast Asia
- Tripogon humilis - Tibet
- Tripogon jacquemontii - India
- Tripogon larsenii - Thailand
- Tripogon leptophyllus - Eritrea, Ethiopia, Sudan, Yemen, Oman
- Tripogon liouae - Tibet
- Tripogon lisboae - India
- Tripogon loliiformis - New Guinea, Australia
- Tripogon longiaristatus - China, Japan, Korea
- Tripogon major - Africa
- Tripogon minimus - Africa incl Madagascar + Cape Verde
- Tripogon modestus - Angola, Malawi
- Tripogon montanus - Eritrea, Ethiopia, Sudan, Uganda, Saudi Arabia, Yemen
- Tripogon multiflorus - Cape Verde, Niger, Chad, Eritrea, Ethiopia, Kenya, Saudi Arabia, Oman, Yemen, Pakistan
- Tripogon narayanae - India
- Tripogon nicorae - Bolivia, Argentina, Chile
- Tripogon oliganthos - Yemen
- Tripogon polyanthus - India
- Tripogon pungens - India
- Tripogon purpurascens - southern Asia from Yemen to Xinjiang to Thailand
- Tripogon ravianus - Tamil Nadu
- Tripogon rupestris - Yunnan, Nepal, Tibet
- Tripogon siamensis - Thailand
- Tripogon sichuanicus - Sichuan
- Tripogon sivarajanii - Kerala
- Tripogon spicatus - from Texas to Uruguay
- Tripogon subtilissimus - Kenya, Ethiopia, Somalia, Yemen, Oman
- Tripogon thorelii - Laos, Thailand, Vietnam
- Tripogon trifidus - Himalayas, Yunnan, northern Indochina
- Tripogon vellarianus - Kerala
- Tripogon velliangiriensis - Tamil Nadu
- Tripogon wardii - Sri Lanka, Myanmar
- Tripogon wightii - India
- Tripogon yunnanensis - Sichuan, Yunnan, Tibet
- Tripogon malabaricus - Kerala
- Tripogon idukkianus - Kerala
- Tripogon bimucronatus - Kerala
- Tripogon munnarensis - Kerala
- Tripogon karnatakensis - Karnataka
- Tripogon uma-ganeshii - Andhra Pradesh

Formerly included: see Indopoa Oropetium

- Tripogon pauperculus - Indopoa paupercula
- Tripogon roxburghianus - Oropetium roxburghianum
