= Indrai fort =

Historic building in Maharashtra, India

Indrai Fort
- Part of Ajintha Satmal Hill Range
- Nashik district, Maharashtra
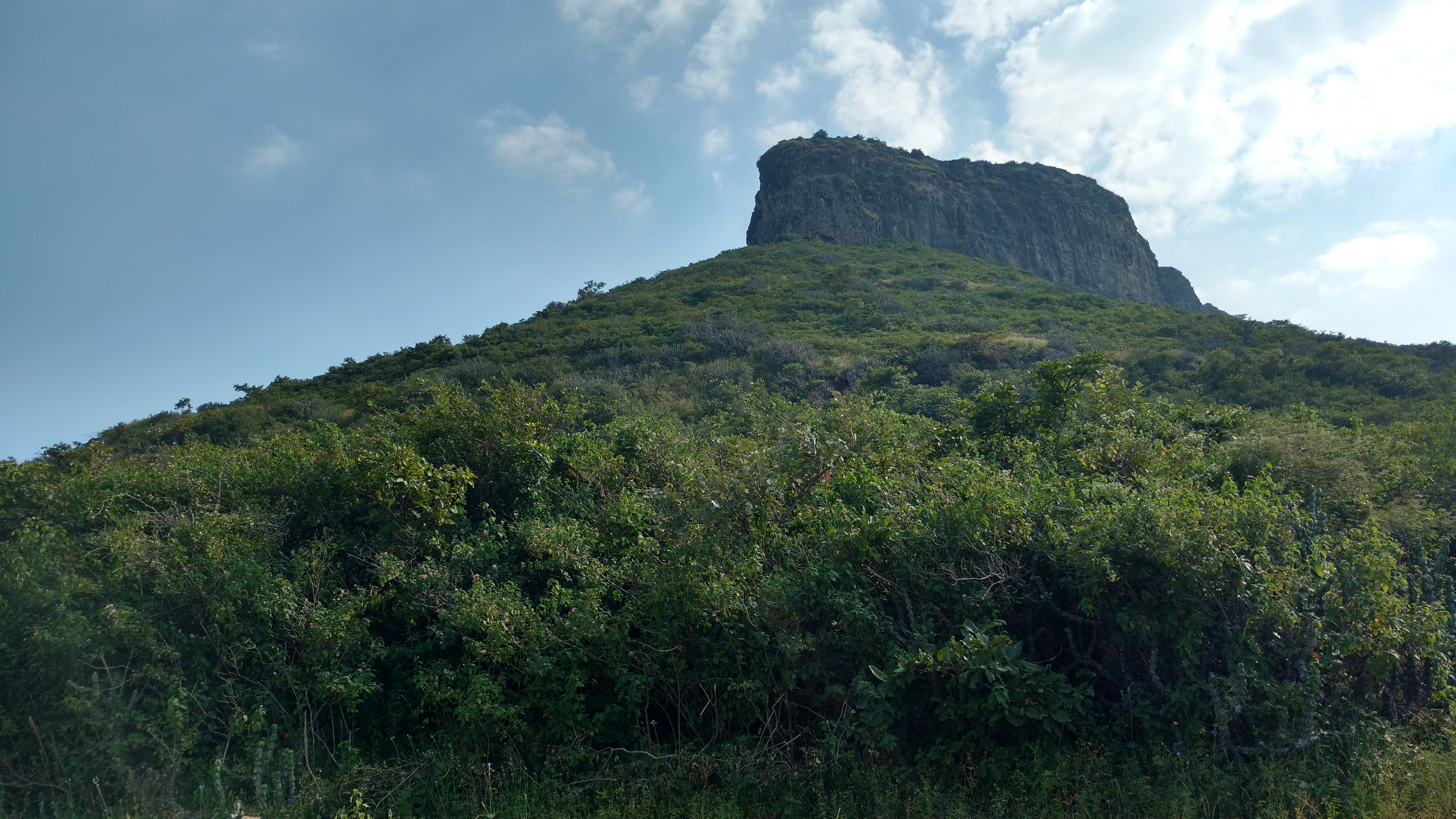
- Indrai Fort from Indraiwadi

Site information
- Type: Hill fort
- Owner: Government of India
- Open to the public: Yes
- Condition: Ruins

Location
- Shown within Maharashtra
- Coordinates: 20°21′40.8″N 74°12′33.5″E
- Height: 1368.55m (4490 Ft)

Site history
- Materials: Stone

Indrai Fort / Indragiri Fort is a fort located 75 km from Nashik, in Nashik district, of Maharashtra. This fort though is an important fort in the Nashik district but, it is less visited by the trekkers. In Chandwad taluka, there are 4 forts in a line on the Satmal hill range, the Chandwad fort, Indrai fort, Rajdher fort, and Koldher fort. This fort is easy to climb but requires 3 hours to reach the fort.

== History ==
Much less history about this fort is known. This fort was surrendered to Captain Mackintosh in 1818 after the garrison in the fort saw the burning of the neighboring Rajdher fort.

== How to reach ==
The nearest town is Chandwad which is 69 km from Nashik. The base village of the fort is Indraiwadi which is 9 km from Chandwad. There are good hotels at Chandwad, now tea and snacks are also available in small hotels at Indraiwadi. The trekking path starts from the hillock south of the Indraiwadi village. The route is very safe and passes through dense scrubs. There is no marked path that leads to the fort; it is advisable to hire a local guide from the village. It takes about two hours to reach the scarp of the fort.

A narrow path along the base of the scarp takes a northern detour to reach the rock-cut steps. The steps are 2m wide and 150 in number. It takes about 15 minutes to climb the steps. The entrance gate is nowhere to be seen. There is plenty of water available on the fort. The night stay at the fort can be made in the caves within the fort.

== Places to see ==
The rock-cut steps form a valley leading to the fort. A rock-cut inscription in the Persian language is seen on the walls of the entrance. There are many rock-cut water cisterns on the fort. The Kacheri, the Mahadev temple, and 10 rock-cut caves are the places to be seen. It takes about one hour to visit all the places in the fort.

== Gallery ==
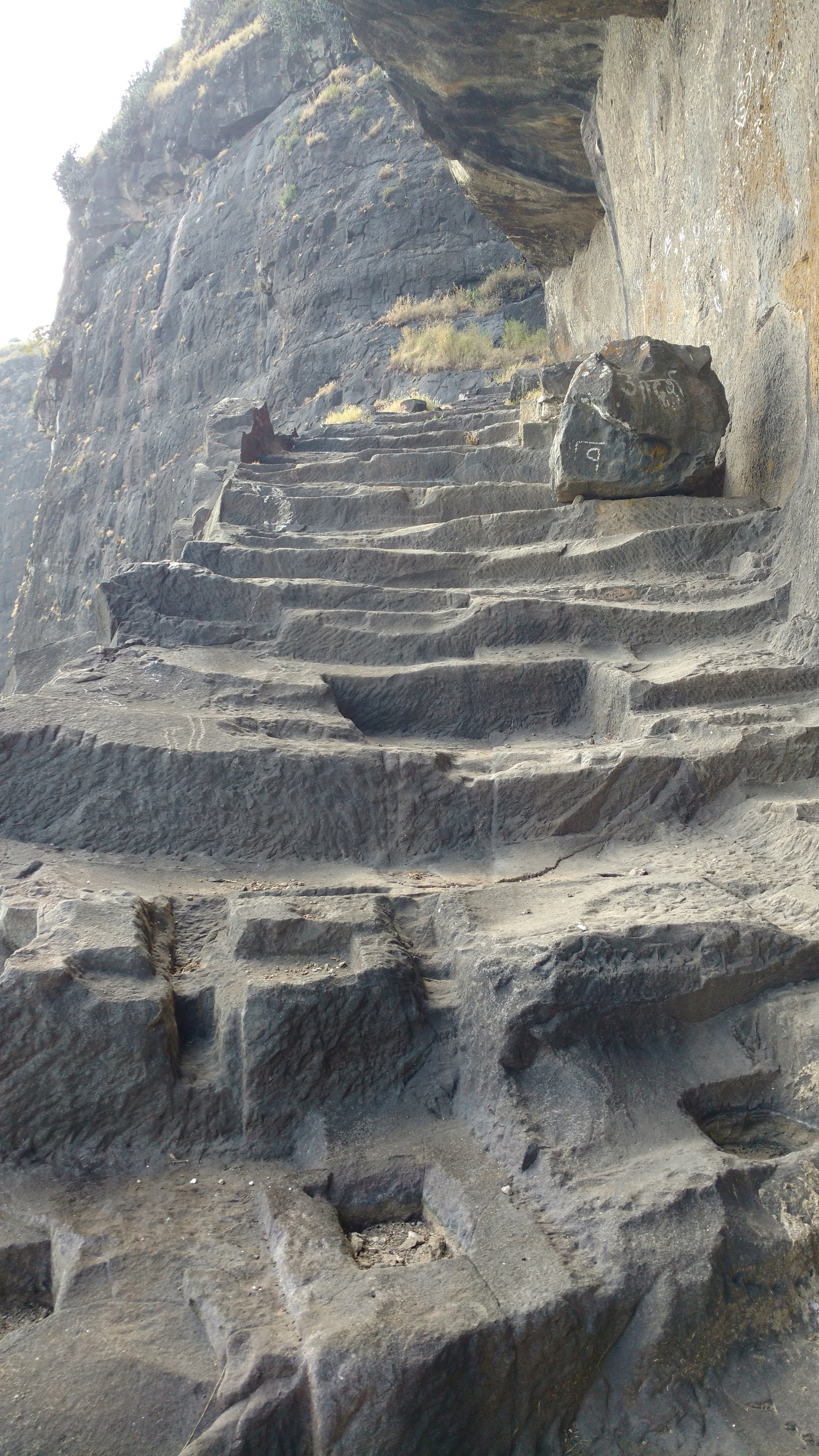
Rock cut steps

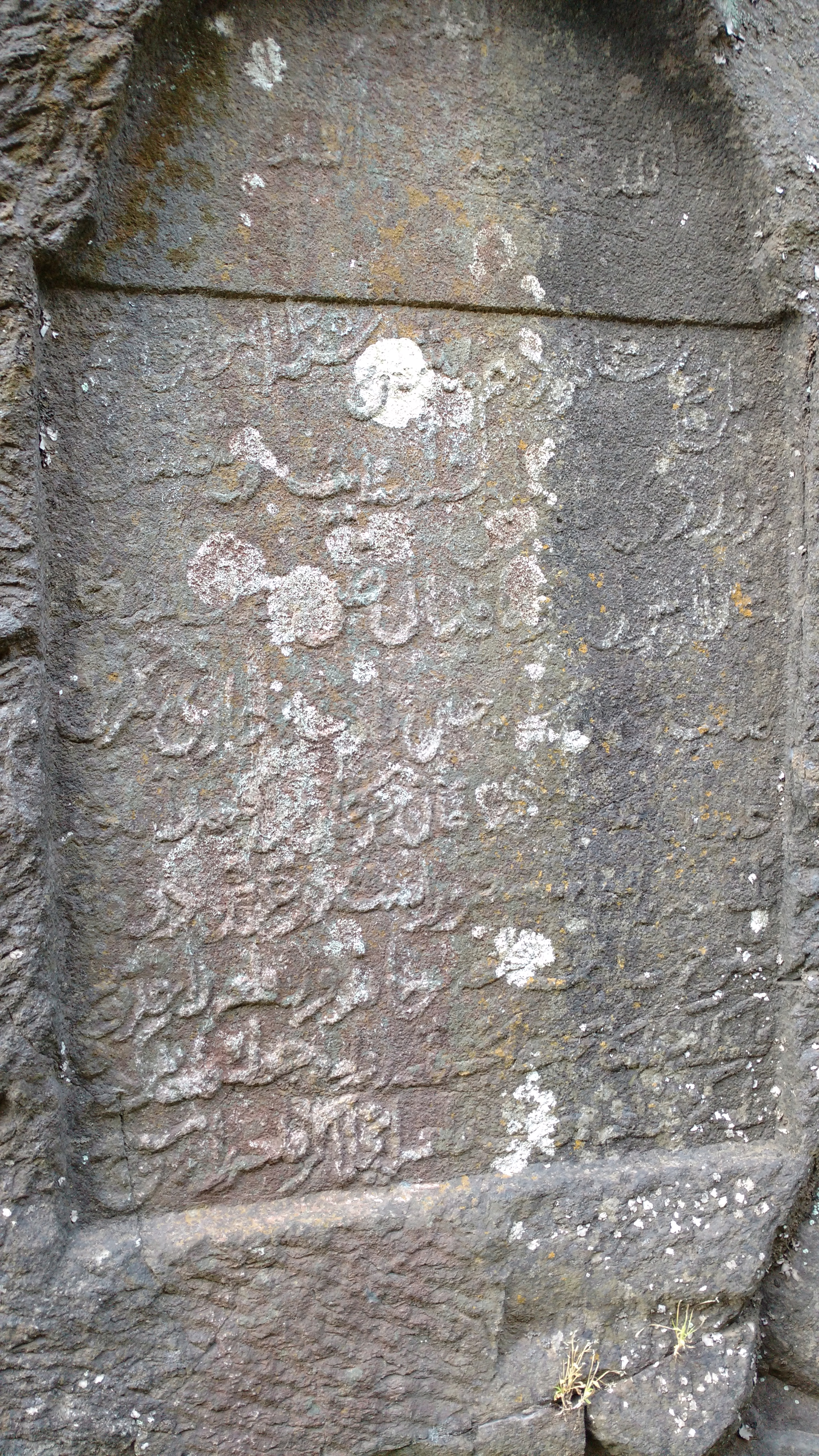
Inscription in Farasi

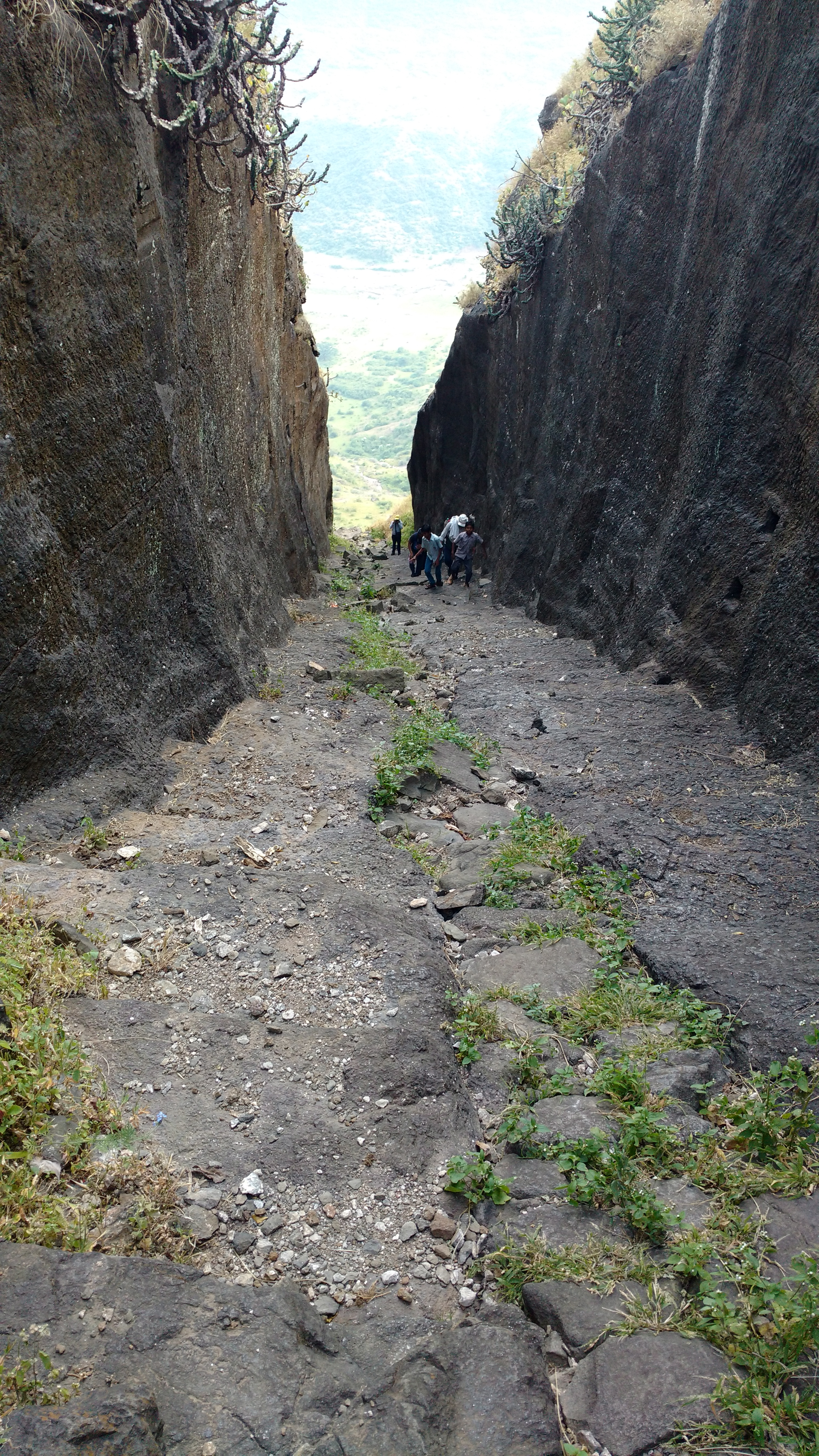
Steps

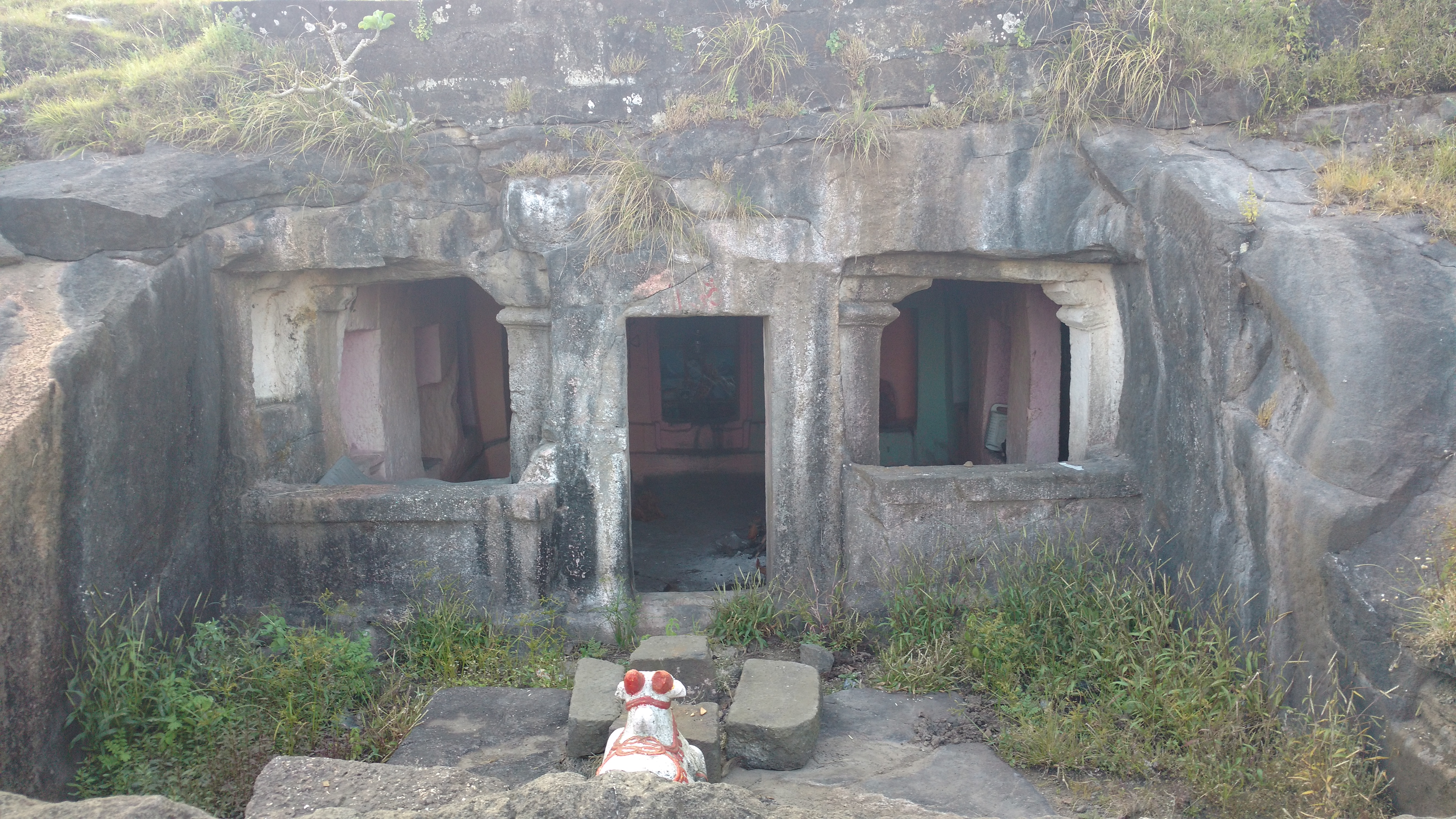
Mahadev temple

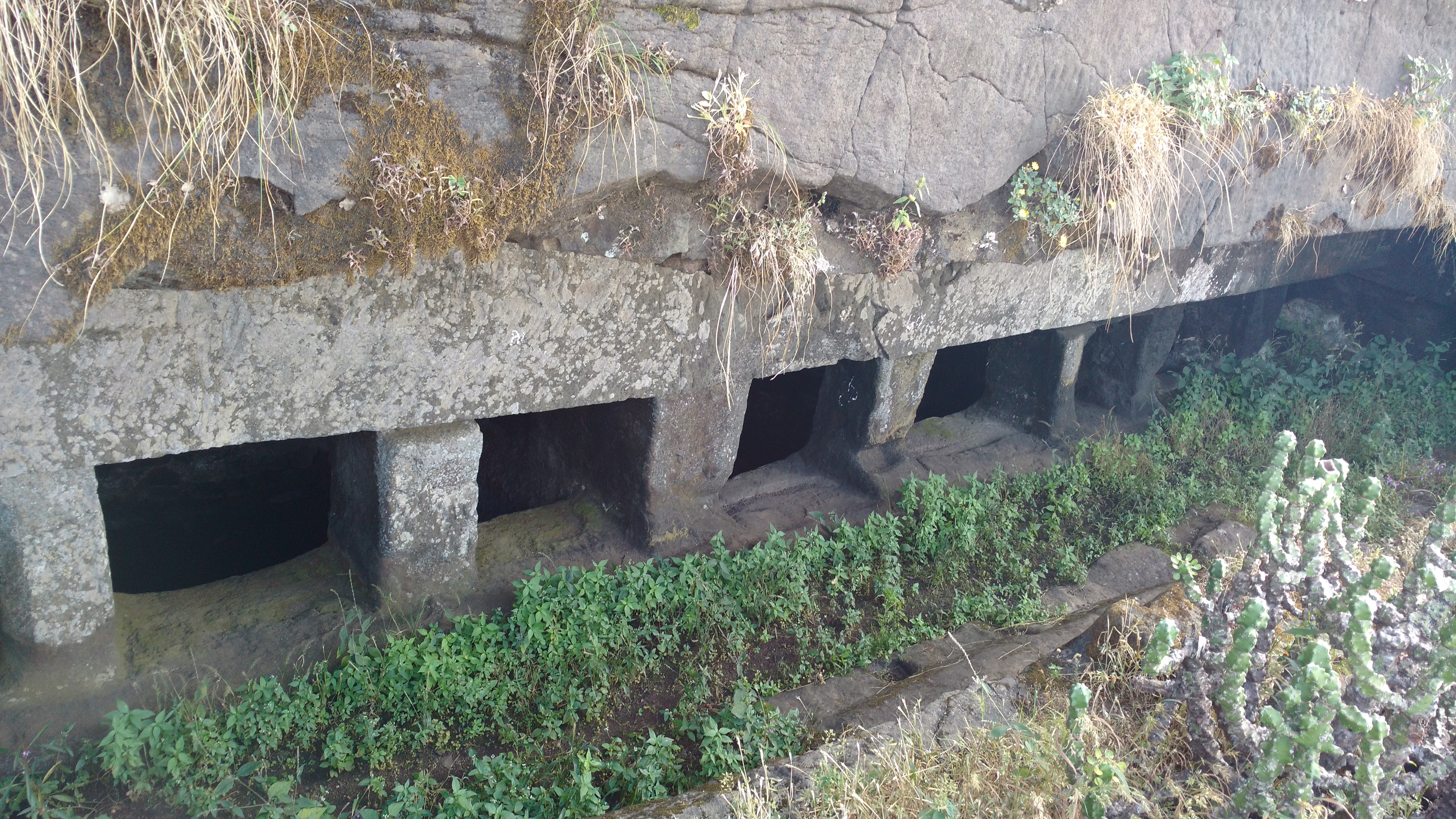
Kacheri caves

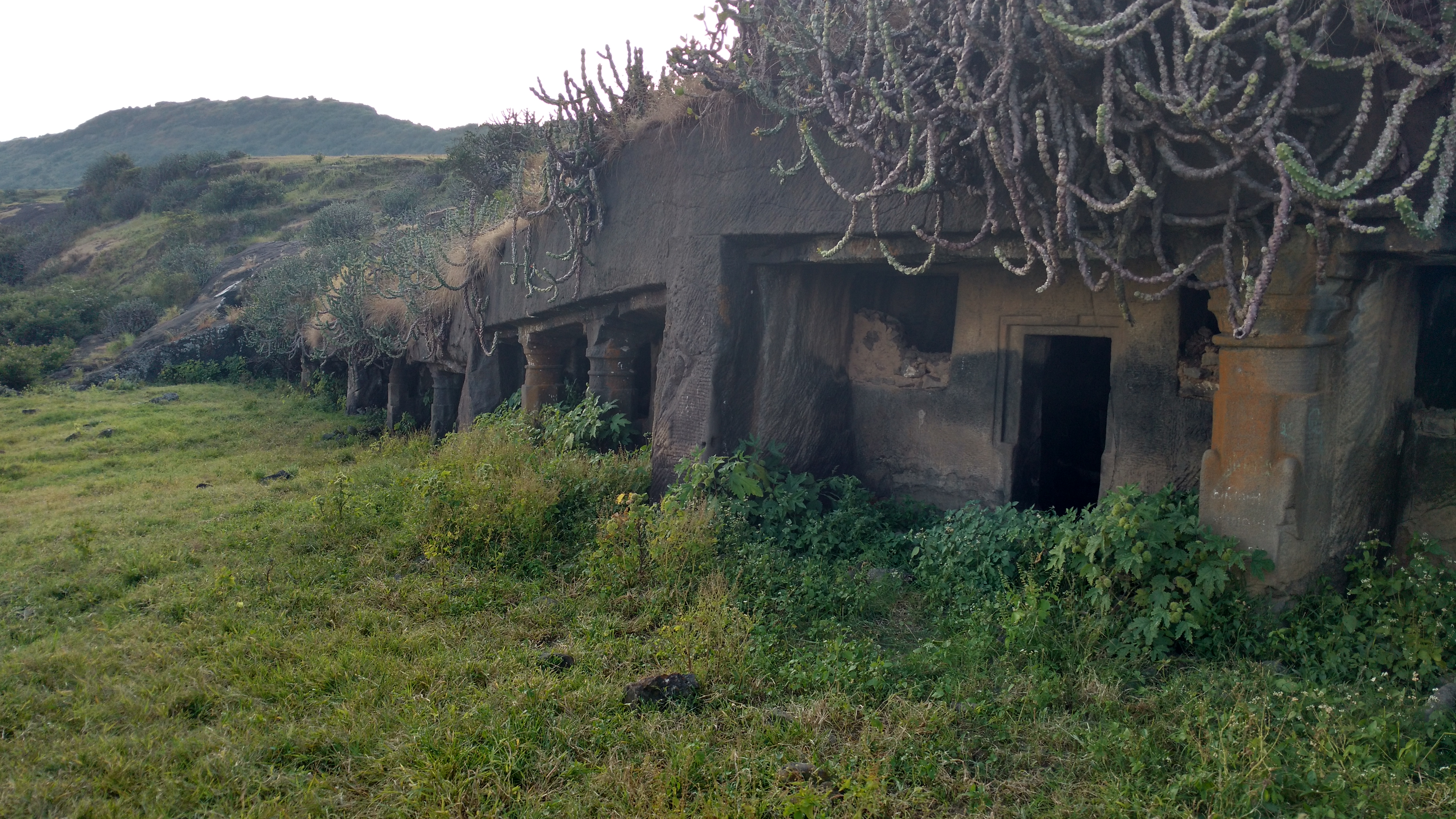
Rockcut caves

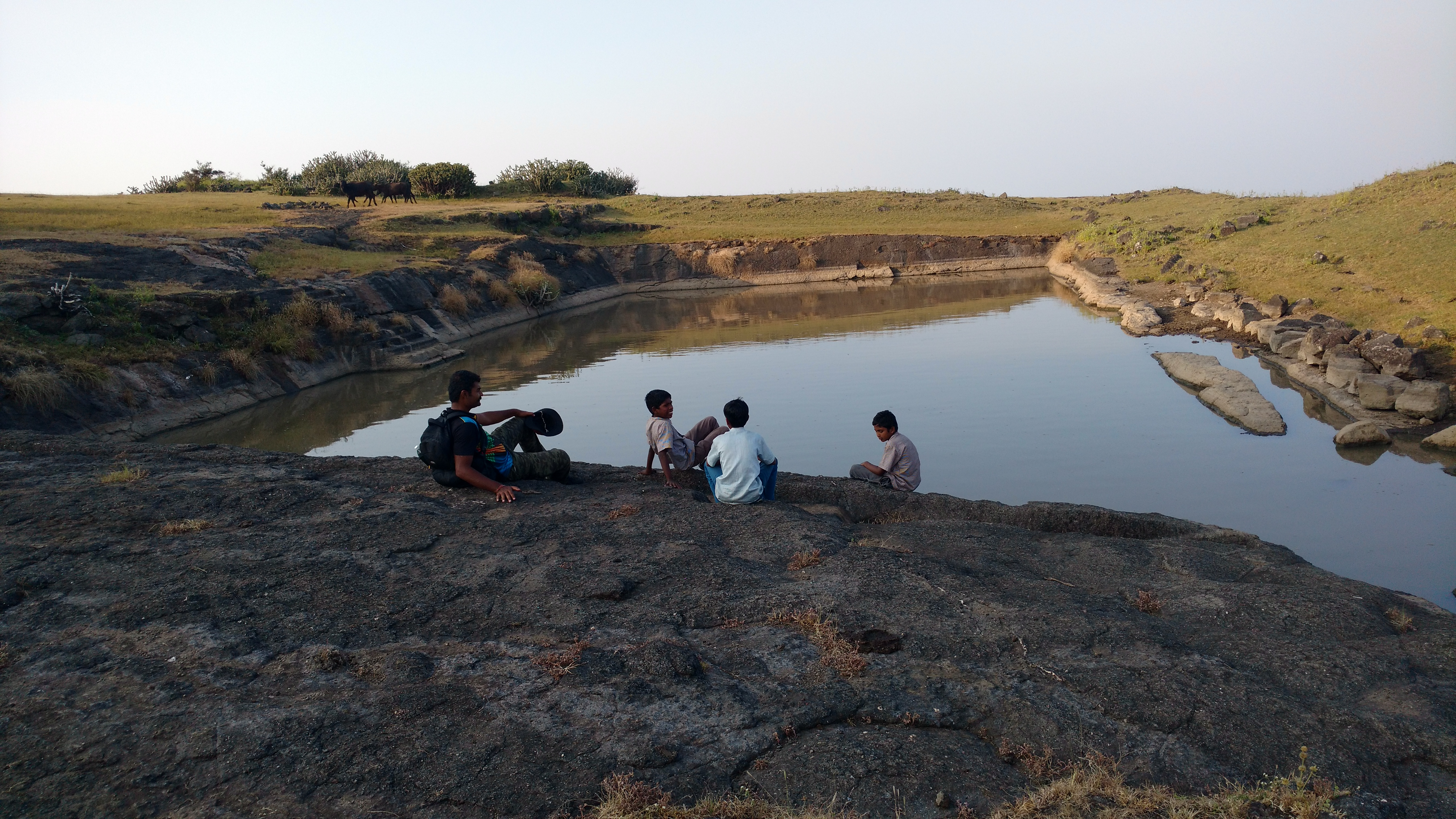
Rockcut water pond

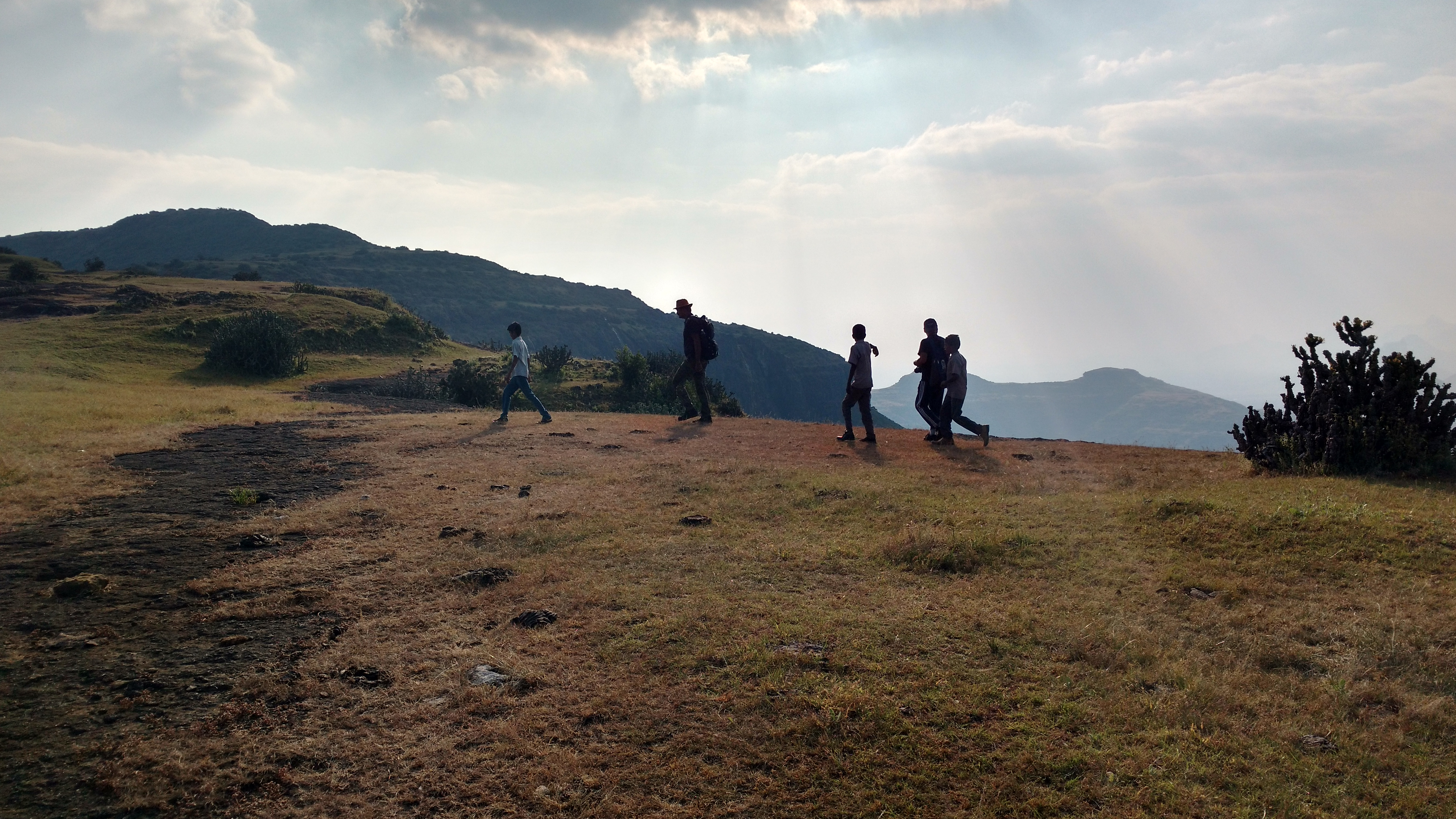
Top of the fort

== See also ==
- List of forts in Maharashtra
- List of forts in India
- Marathi People
- Battles involving the Maratha Empire
- Maratha Army
- Maratha titles
- Military history of India
