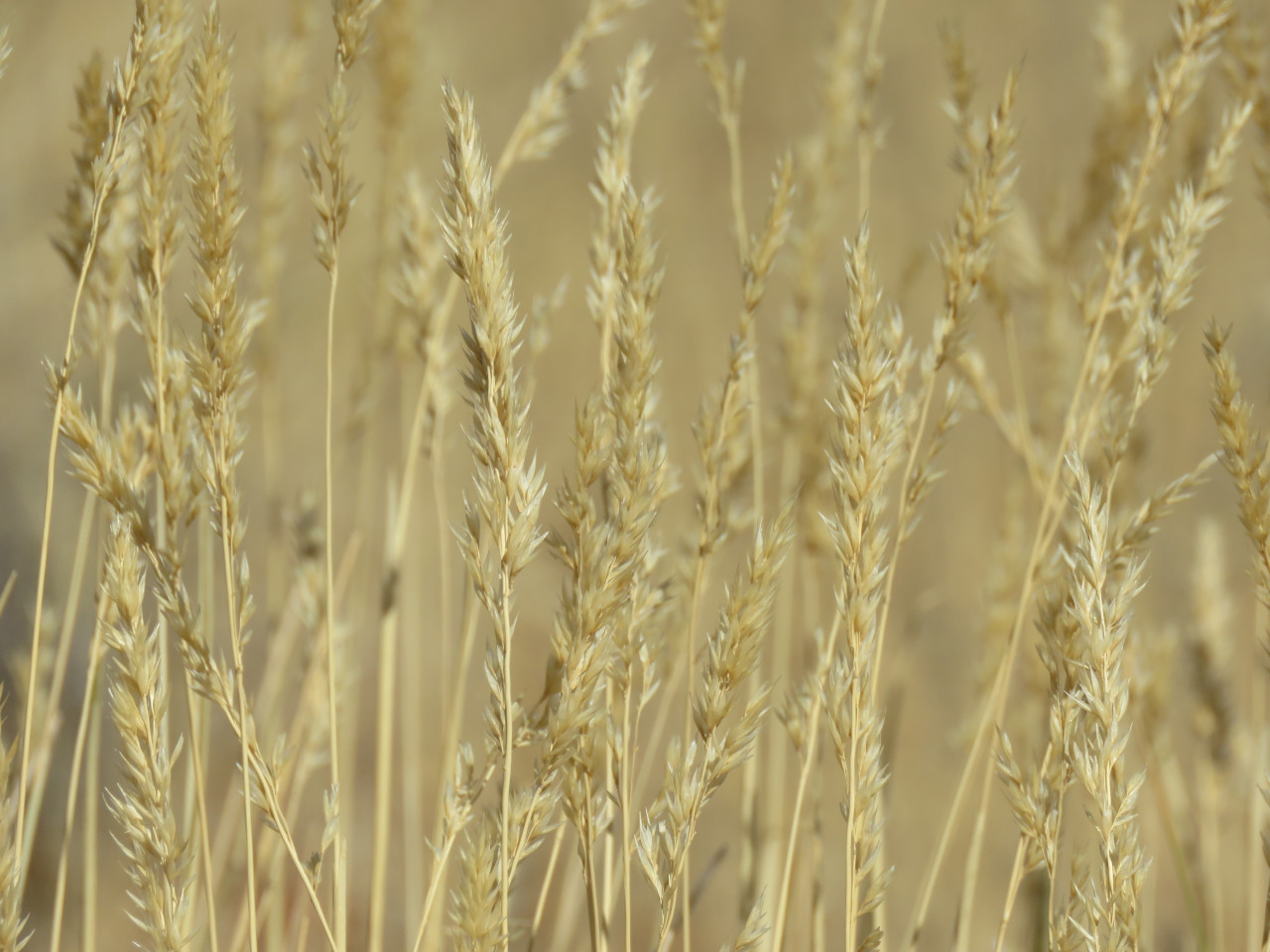
- Seed pods

Scientific classification
- Kingdom: Plantae
- Clade: Tracheophytes
- Clade: Angiosperms
- Clade: Monocots
- Clade: Commelinids
- Order: Poales
- Family: Poaceae
- Subfamily: Chloridoideae
- Genus: Centropodia
- Species: C. glauca

Binomial name
- Centropodia glauca (Nees) Cope (1983)

Synonyms
- Asthenatherum glaucum (Nees) Nevski (1934); Asthenatherum glaucum var. lasiophyllum (Pilg.) Conert (1962); Danthonia glauca Nees (1841); Danthonia glauca var. lasiophylla Pilg. (1912); Danthonia suffrutescens Stapf (1899)

= Centropodia glauca =

Species of grass

Centropodia glauca, also known as ghagras or ikagras is a species of grass native to Botswana, Namibia, South Africa (Cape Provinces and Northern Provinces), and Kenya. The occurrence of this grass is proof of well-preserved sandveld. The grass is very hardy and can thrive in dry veld. It is a perennial pole grass that usually grows between 200–850mm but can grow up to 1m tall. The flowering period is between September and May. Because ghagras have few leaves and the stalks are almost always green, it is resistant to fire.

It grows mainly in deep sandy soil, particularly in duneveld; also grows in gravelly soil. It is eaten by game, especially oryx.

It was first described by Christian Gottfried Daniel Nees von Esenbeck, and given its current name by Thomas Arthur Cope.
