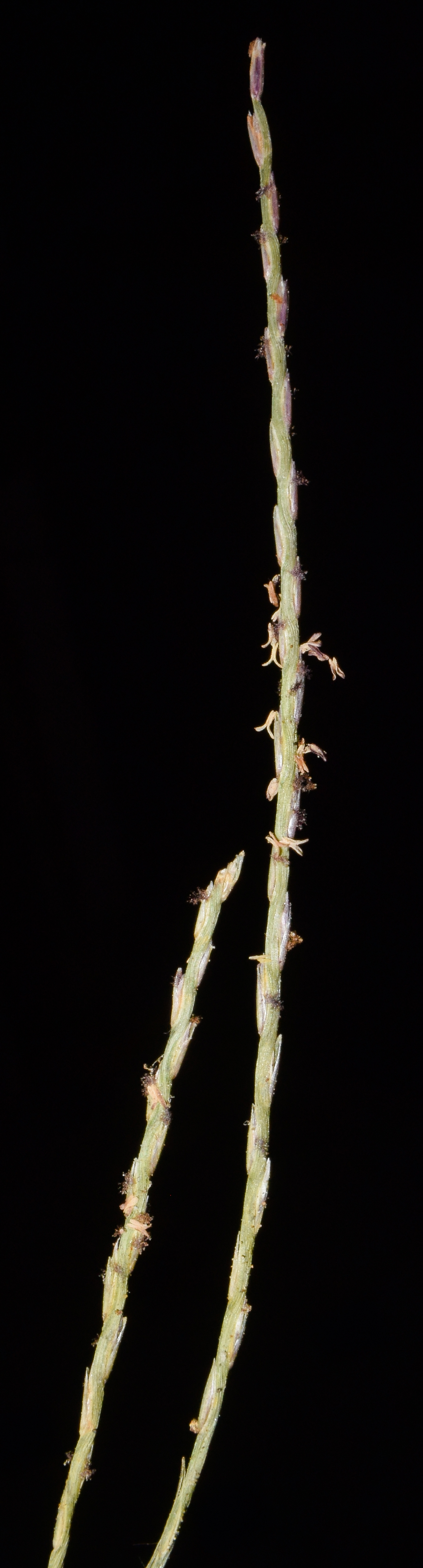
- Inflorescence of Oropetium roxburghianum

Scientific classification
- Kingdom: Plantae
- Clade: Tracheophytes
- Clade: Angiosperms
- Clade: Monocots
- Clade: Commelinids
- Order: Poales
- Family: Poaceae
- Subfamily: Chloridoideae
- Tribe: Cynodonteae
- Subtribe: Tripogoninae
- Genus: Oropetium; Trin.

Synonyms
- Chaetostichium C.E.Hubb.; Lepturella Stapf

= Oropetium =

Genus of grasses

Oropetium is a genus of Asian and African plants in the grass family.

Species

- Oropetium aristatum (Stapf) Pilg. - tropical West Africa
- Oropetium capense Stapf - Arabian Peninsula, desert and near-desert regions of Africa
- Oropetium minimum (Hochst.) Pilg. - Arabian Peninsula, eastern + northeastern Africa
- Oropetium roxburghianum (Schult.) S.M.Phillips - India
- Oropetium thomaeum (L.f.) Trin. - eastern + northeastern Africa, Indian subcontinent, Myanmar, Vietnam
- Oropetium villosulum Stapf ex Bor - India

Formerly included

see Tripogon

- Oropetium africanum - Tripogon africanus
