= Silentvalleya =

Scientific classification
- Kingdom: Plantae
- Clade: Tracheophytes
- Clade: Angiosperms
- Clade: Monocots
- Clade: Commelinids
- Order: Poales
- Family: Poaceae
- Subfamily: Chloridoideae
- Genus: Silentvalleya; V.J.Nair, Sreek., Vajr. & Bhargavan

Type species
- Silentvalleya nairii V.J.Nair, Sreek., Vajr. & Bhargavan

Genus of grasses

Silentvalleya is a genus of Indian plants in the grass family.

Species

- Silentvalleya chandwadensis Gosavi, B.R. Pawar & S.R. Yadav - near Chandwad in Maharashtra
- Silentvalleya nairii V.J.Nair, Sreek., Vajr. & Bhargavan - Lakshadweep, Kerala
