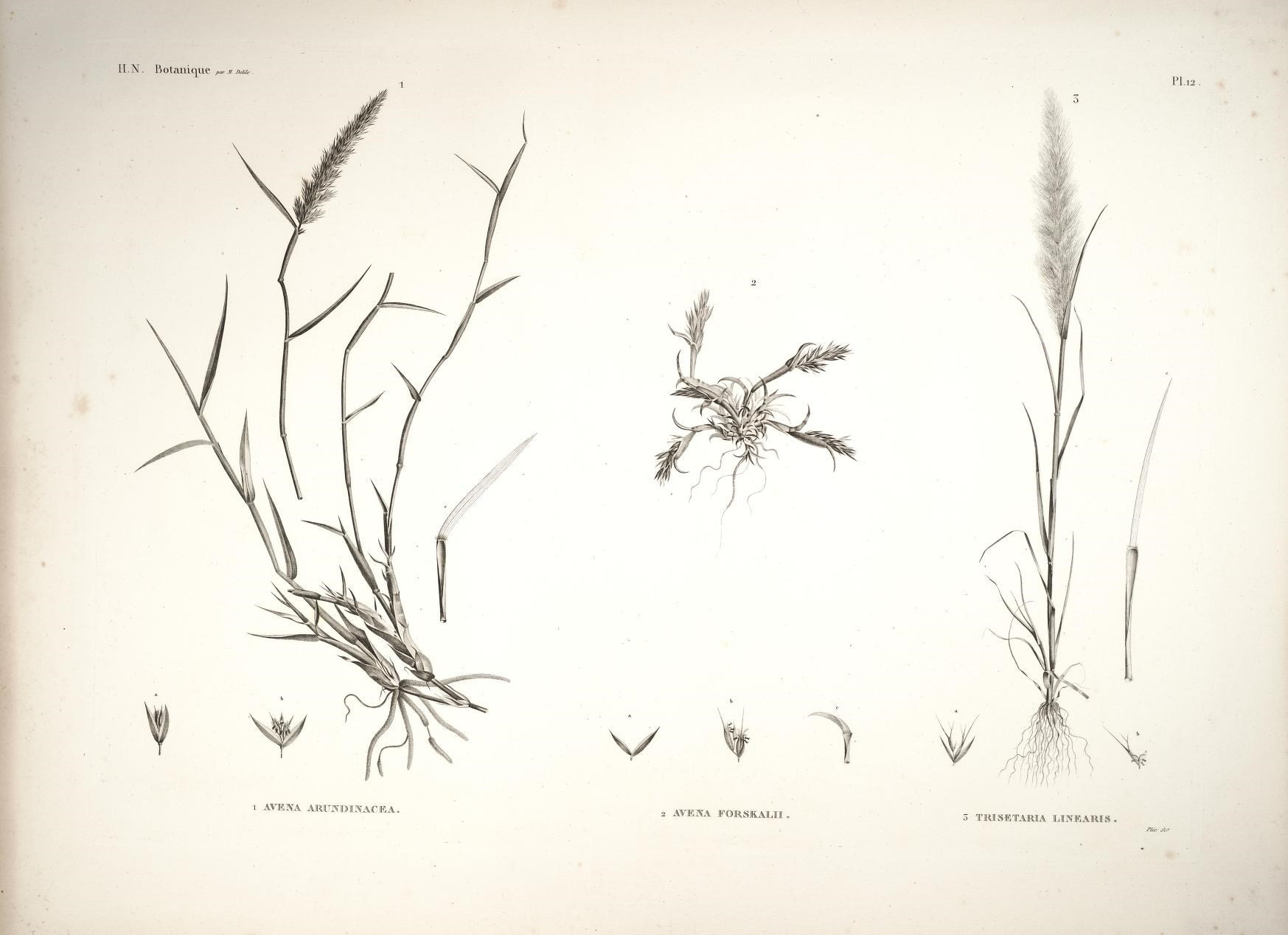
- Centropodia forsskalii (left and middle plants)

Scientific classification
- Kingdom: Plantae
- Clade: Tracheophytes
- Clade: Angiosperms
- Clade: Monocots
- Clade: Commelinids
- Order: Poales
- Family: Poaceae
- Subfamily: Chloridoideae
- Tribe: Centropodieae
- Genus: Centropodia (R.Br.) Rchb.

Synonyms
- Danthonia sect. Centropodia R.Br.; Asthenatherum Nevski

= Centropodia =

Genus of grasses

Centropodia is a genus of Asian and African plants in the grass family.

Species:

- Centropodia forsskalii (Vahl) Cope – Sahara, Middle East, Central Asia
- Centropodia fragilis (Guinet & Sauvage) Cope – Sahara, Sinai, Arabian Peninsula
- Centropodia glauca (Nees) Cope – Kenya, Botswana, Namibia, South Africa
- Centropodia mossamedensis (Rendle) Cope – Angola, Namibia

== See also ==
- List of Poaceae genera
