= Pseudozoysia =

Scientific classification
- Kingdom: Plantae
- Clade: Tracheophytes
- Clade: Angiosperms
- Clade: Monocots
- Clade: Commelinids
- Order: Poales
- Family: Poaceae
- Subfamily: Chloridoideae
- Genus: Pseudozoysia; Chiov.
- Species: P. sessilis

Binomial name
- Pseudozoysia sessilis Chiov.

Species of grasses

Pseudozoysia is a monotypic genus of plant in the grass family. The only known species is Pseudozoysia sessilis, found only in Somalia.
