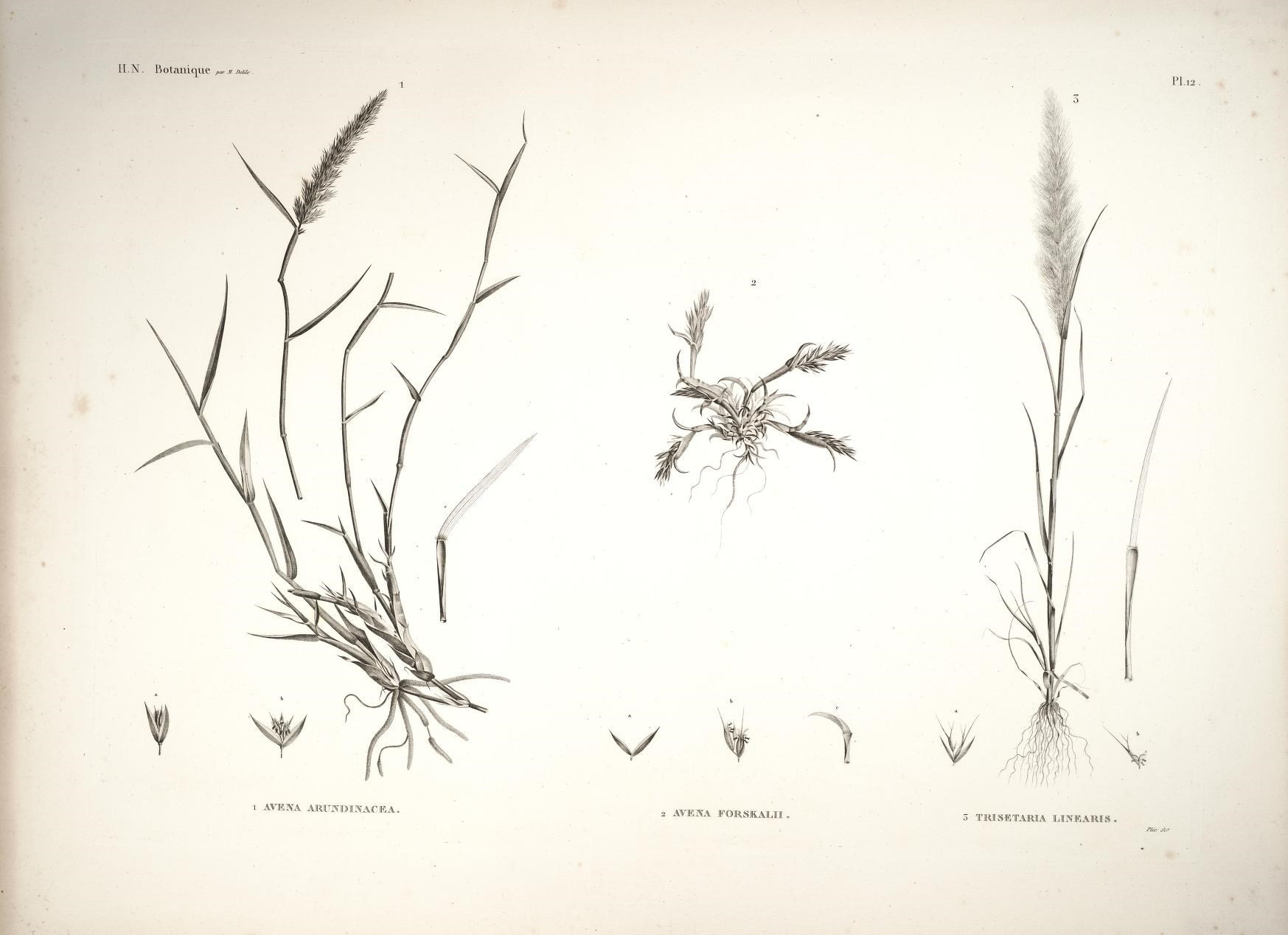
- Examples of Centropodieae

Scientific classification
- Kingdom: Plantae
- Clade: Tracheophytes
- Clade: Angiosperms
- Clade: Monocots
- Clade: Commelinids
- Order: Poales
- Family: Poaceae
- Clade: PACMAD clade
- Subfamily: Chloridoideae
- Tribe: Centropodieae; P.M. Peterson, N.P. Barker & H.P. Linder (2011)

Genera
- Centropodia; Ellisochloa

= Centropodieae =

Tribe of grasses

Centropodieae is a tribe of grasses containing only two genera. It is the earliest-branching lineage in the subfamily Chloridoideae and contains its only genus with C_{3} species, Ellisochloa, while all other species in the tribe and subfamily use the C_{4} photosynthetic pathway.
