= Lepturopetium =

Scientific classification
- Kingdom: Plantae
- Clade: Tracheophytes
- Clade: Angiosperms
- Clade: Monocots
- Clade: Commelinids
- Order: Poales
- Family: Poaceae
- Subfamily: Chloridoideae
- Genus: Lepturopetium; Morat

Type species
- Lepturopetium kuniense Morat

Genus of grasses

Lepturopetium is a genus of Pacific Island plants in the grass family.

Species

- Lepturopetium kuniense Morat - New Caledonia
- Lepturopetium marshallense Fosberg & Sachet - Marshall Islands, Mariana Islands, Cook Islands
