= Ellisochloa =

Scientific classification
- Kingdom: Plantae
- Clade: Tracheophytes
- Clade: Angiosperms
- Clade: Monocots
- Clade: Commelinids
- Order: Poales
- Family: Poaceae
- Subfamily: Chloridoideae
- Tribe: Centropodieae
- Genus: Ellisochloa; P.M.Peterson & N.P.Barker

Genus of grasses

Ellisochloa is a genus of Namibian and South African plants in the grass family.

Species

- Ellisochloa papposa (Nees) P.M.Peterson & N.P.Barker - Cape Province
- Ellisochloa rangei (Pilg.) P.M.Peterson & N.P.Barker - Namibia

== See also ==
- List of Poaceae genera
