= Pogonochloa =

Scientific classification
- Kingdom: Plantae
- Clade: Tracheophytes
- Clade: Angiosperms
- Clade: Monocots
- Clade: Commelinids
- Order: Poales
- Family: Poaceae
- Subfamily: Chloridoideae
- Genus: Pogonochloa; C.E.Hubb.
- Species: P. greenwayi

Binomial name
- Pogonochloa greenwayi C.E.Hubb.

Genus of grasses

Pogonochloa is a genus of plants in the grass family. The only known species is Pogonochloa greenwayi, native to Zambia and Zimbabwe.
