= Rajdher fort =

Fort in Maharashtra, India

Rajdeher Fort
- Part of Ajintha Satmal Hill Range
- Nashik district, Maharashtra
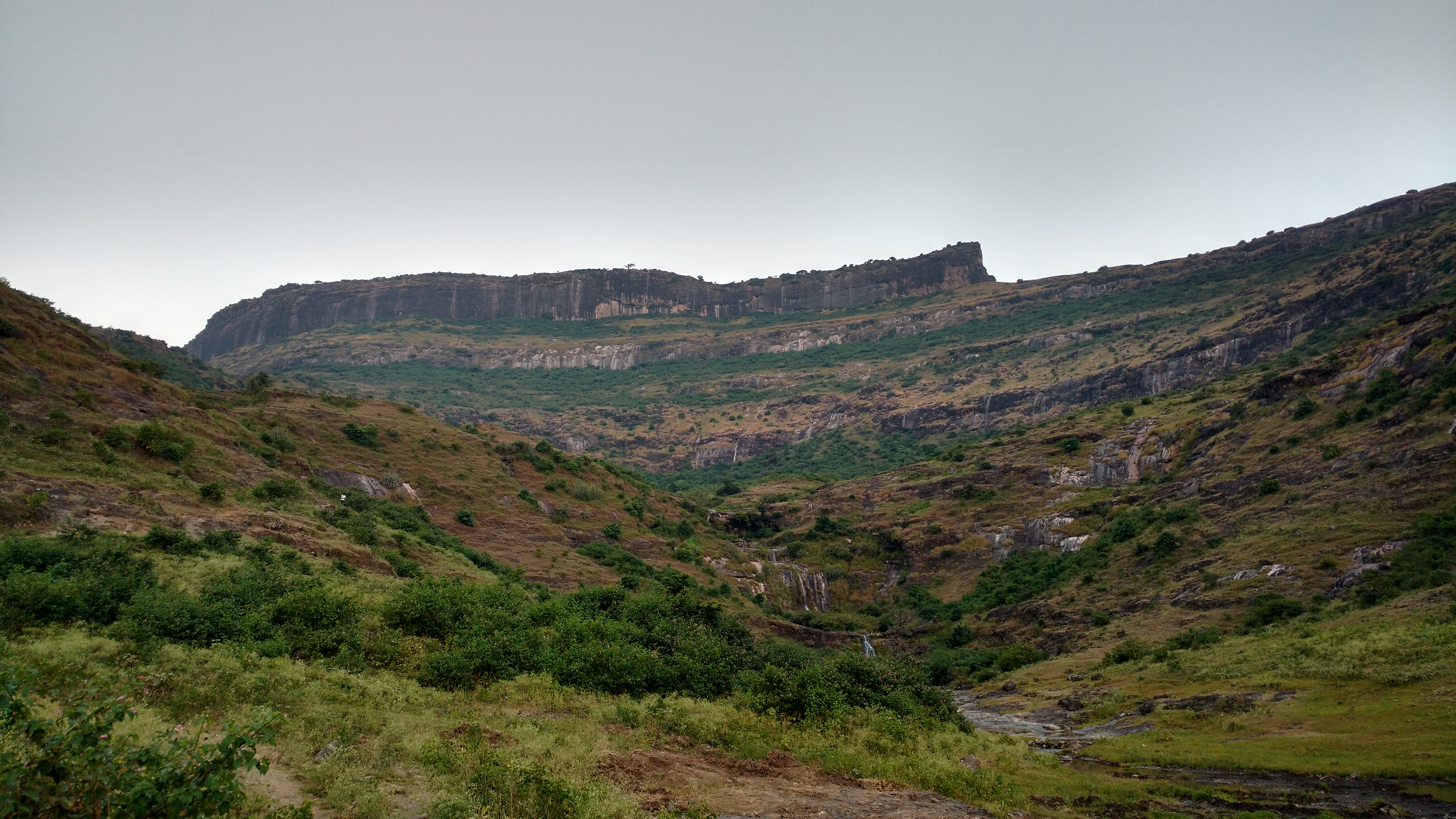
- Rajdher fort from Rajdherwadi

Site information
- Type: Hill fort
- Owner: Government of India
- Controlled by: Yadava of devgiri(1216-1217); Khilji dynasty (1217- ) Moghul Empire(1601- ) Maratha Empire (1752-1818); United Kingdom: East India Company (1818-1857); British Raj (1857-1947); India (1947-)
- Open to the public: Yes
- Condition: Ruins

Location
- Shown within Maharashtra
- Coordinates: 20°23′11.9″N 74°11′40″E
- Height: 4410 Ft.

Site history
- Materials: Stone

Rajdeher Fort is a fort located 10 km (6.2 mi) from chandwad, Nashik district, of Maharashtra. This fort is an important fort in Nashik district.

== History ==
This fort was built earlier than Yadava period. This fort was under the control of Yadavas in 1216-17. This fort was under control of Alauddin Khalji and later under the Faruki. In 1601 the Khandesh Suba was in the hands of Moghuls, this fort was handed over to Ramajipant of Bhadgaon in return of the victory over Ashirigad. The Bakhar records depict this fort to be under the control of Shivaji Maharaj. In 1752 under the Treaty of Bhalki, this fort was surrendered by Nizam to Peshwa. In 1762 Madhavrao Peshwa handed over this fort to Vitthal Shivdev for yearly revenue of Rupees ten thousand for the fort. In 1764 the Pawar brothers of Chalisgaon revolted against Peshwa, which was crushed by Bajirao-II by sending Vittalrao Vinchurkar to capture Chalisgaon, the Rajdeher fort was also brought under the control of Peshwas. On 15 April 1818 this fort was won by Col. Prother of British forces, after a fierce battle with Nikam Deshmukh.

== How to reach ==
The nearest town is Chandwad which is 66 km from Nashik. The base village of the fort is Rajdeherwadi which is 11 km from Chandwad. There are good hotels at Chandwad. The trekking path starts from the hillock west of the Rajdeherwadi. The route is very safe and wide. There are no trees on the trekking route. It takes about two hours to reach the entrance gate of the fort. The path is marked with limestone markings. The trek path is very clearly seen from the base village. The night stay on the fort can be made in the caves on the fort, however, the stay at the temple in the base village is a routine night stay halt for the trekkers. The villagers from the local village make night stay and food arrangements at a reasonable cost.

== Places to see ==
There is a single gate on the main entrance path of the fort. The main entrance gate has an inscription in Persian. There is a rock cut water cistern on the fort. The water is available round the year for drinking purpose. It takes about one hour to visit the fort top.

== Gallery ==
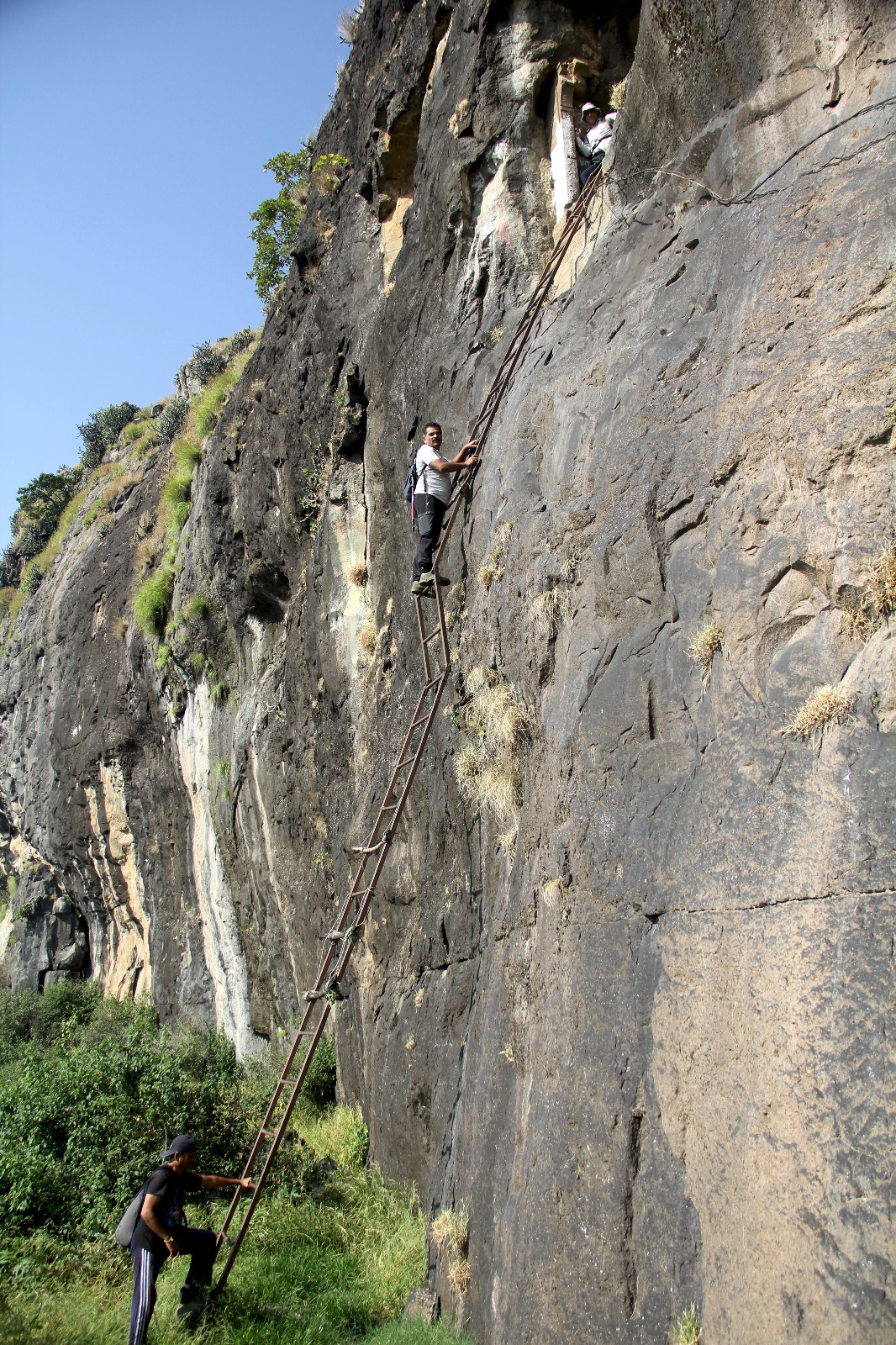
Climb to the entrance of fort

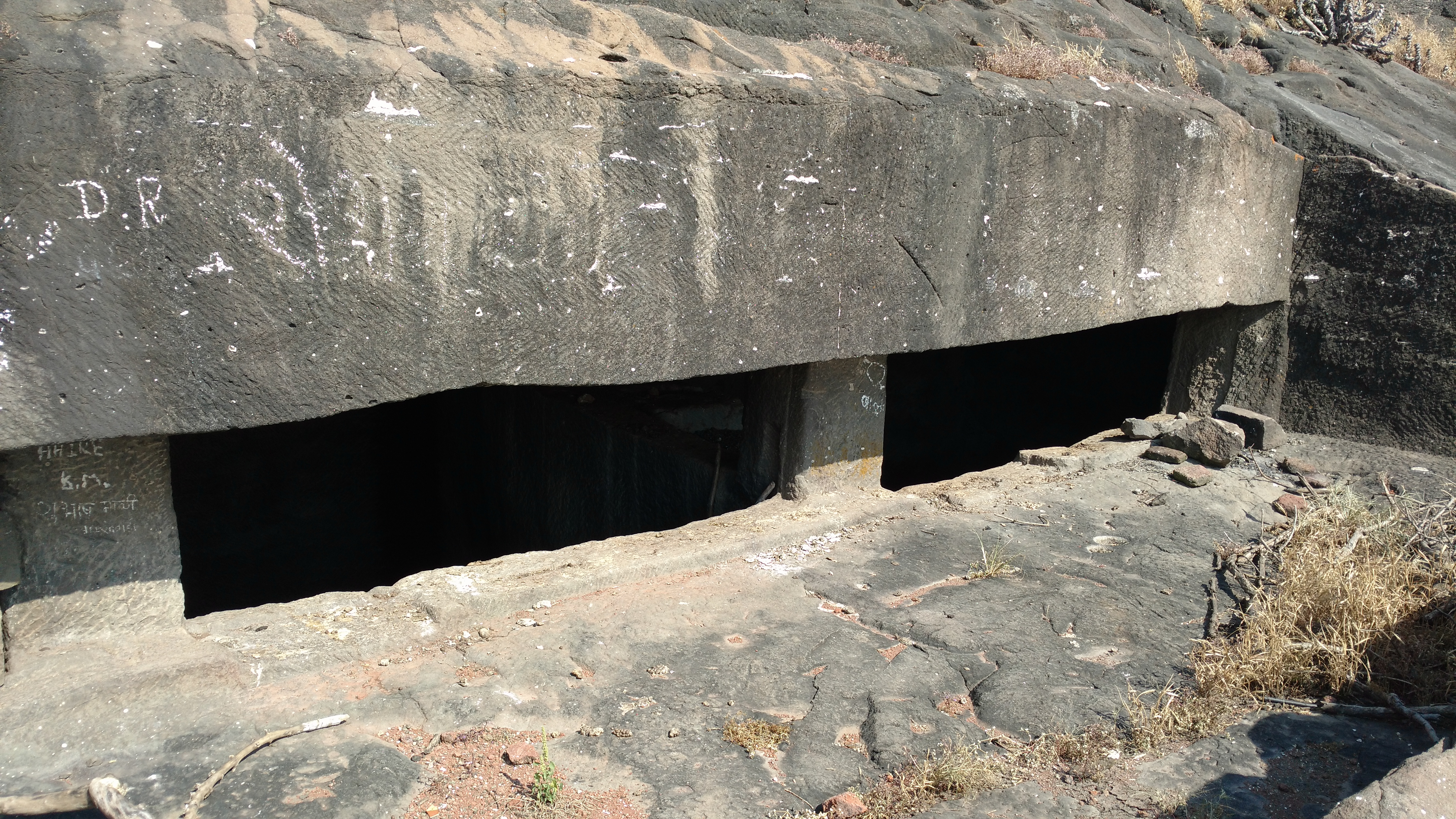
Rockcut underground Water cistern

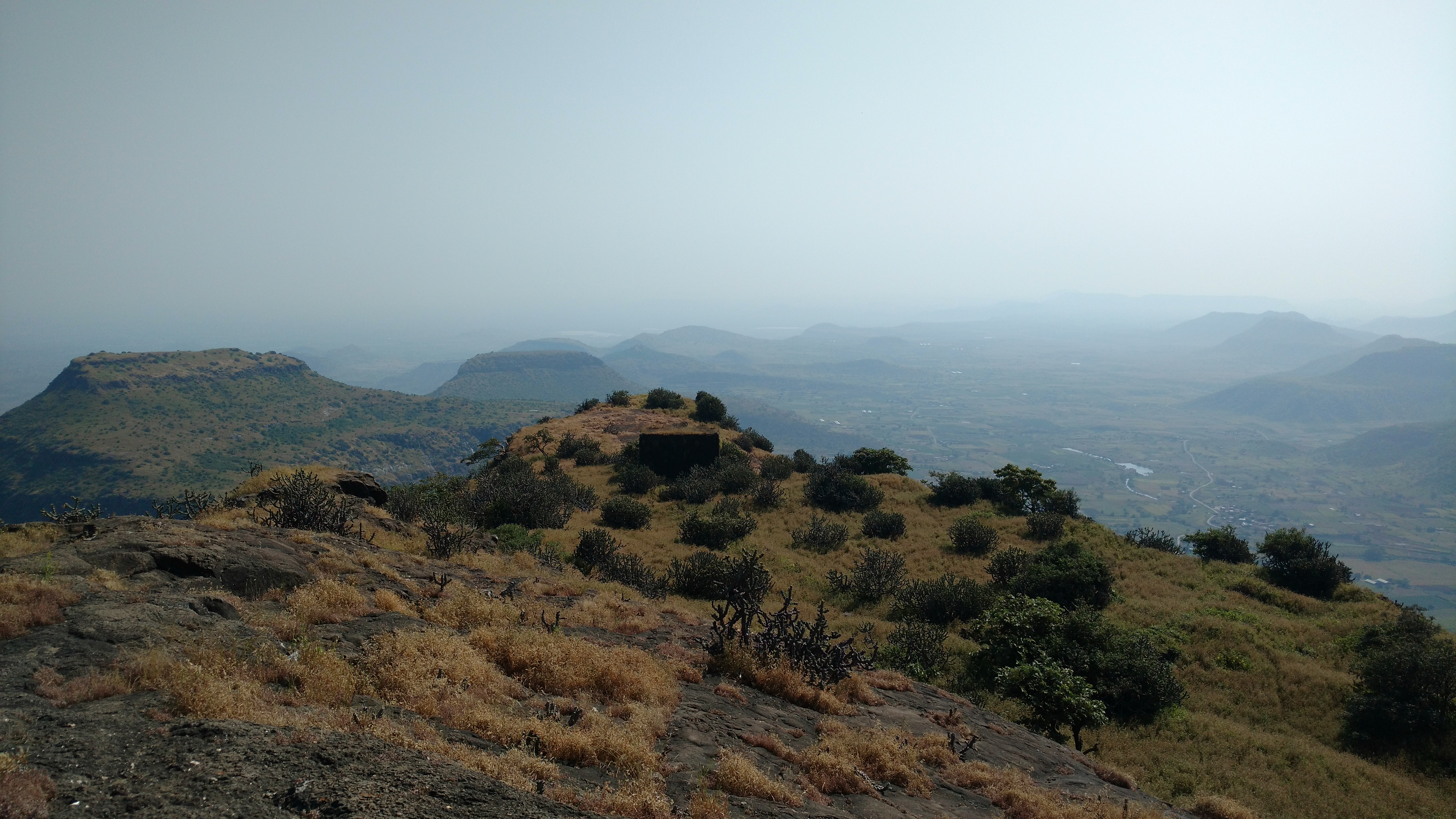
Top of the fort

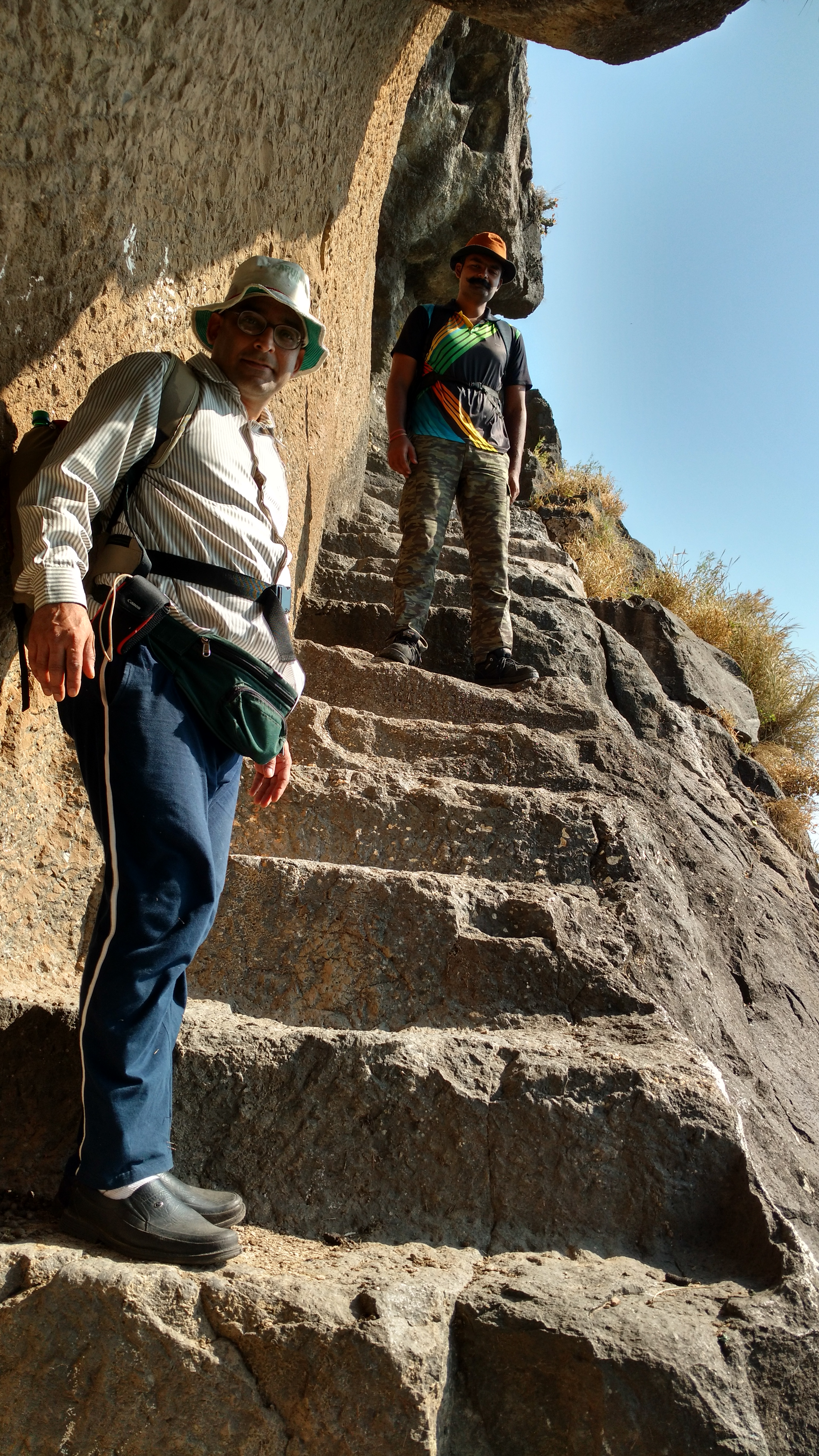
The rock cut steps

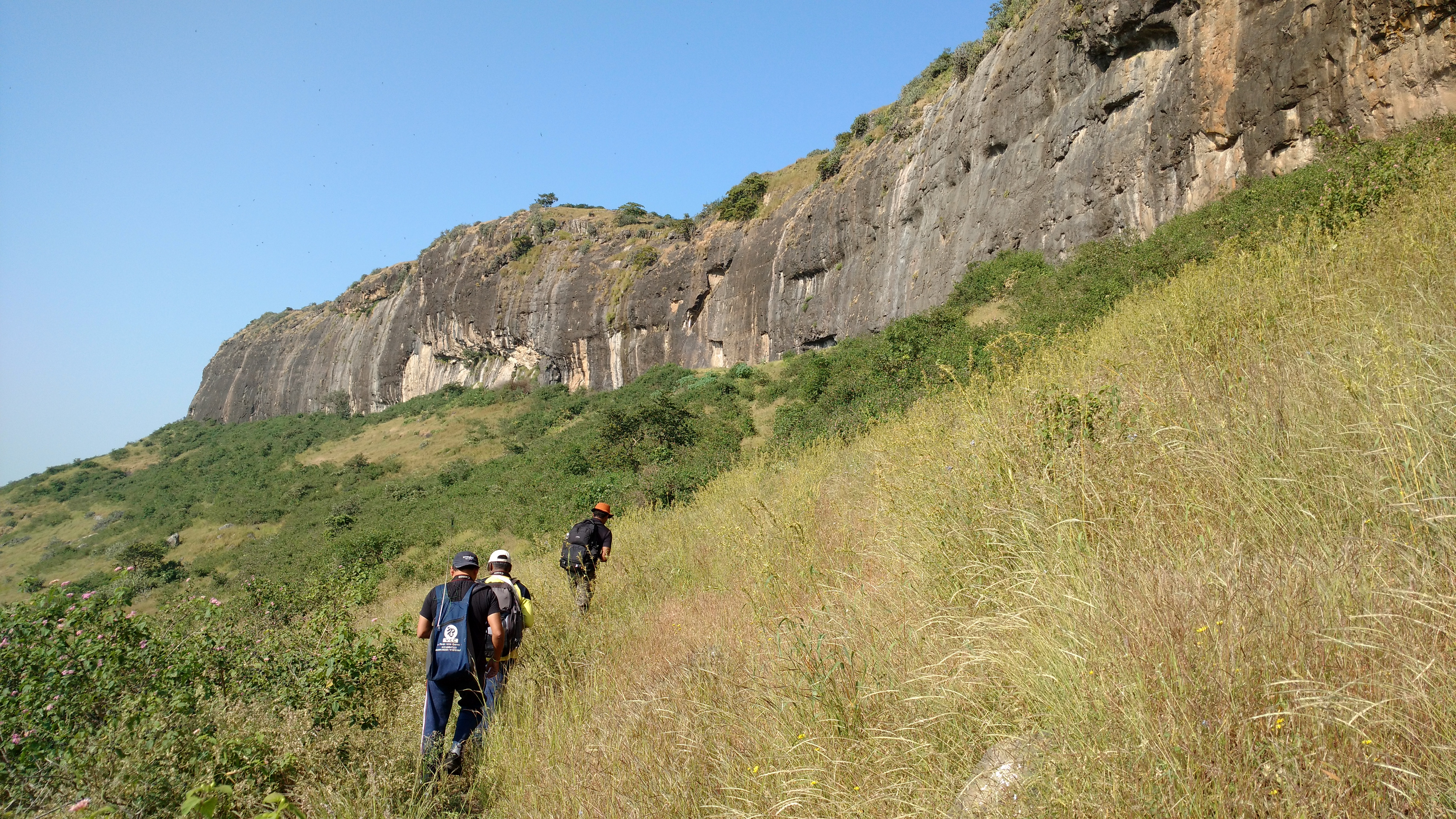
The trek path

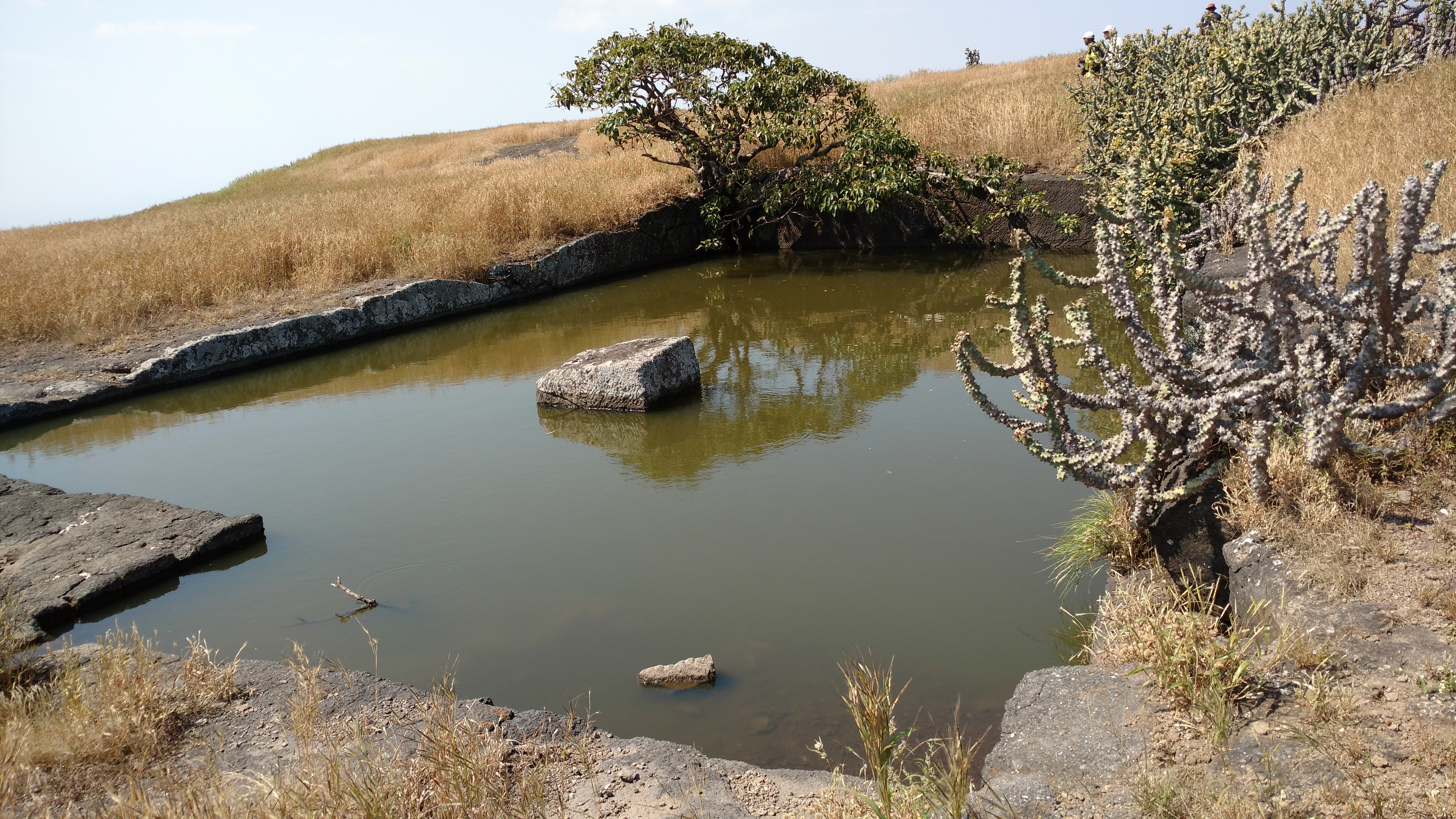
water cistern

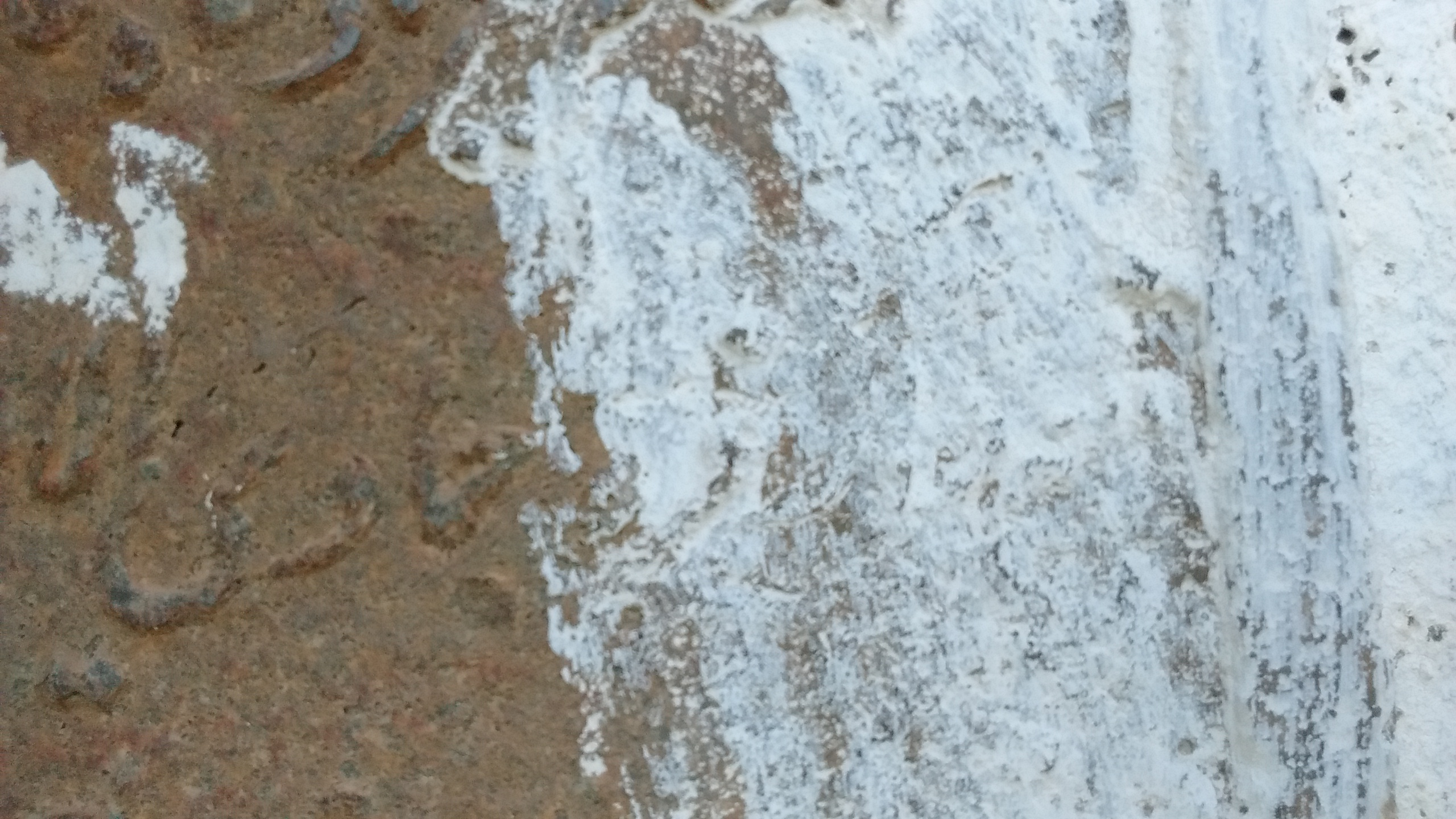
Inscription in Persian

Nearest Villages

Rajdher wadi

Kapshi

== See also ==
- List of forts in Maharashtra
- List of forts in India
- Baji Rao II
- Marathi People
- Maratha Navy
- List of Maratha dynasties and states
- Maratha War of Independence
- Battles involving the Maratha Empire
- Maratha Army
- Maratha titles
- Military history of India
