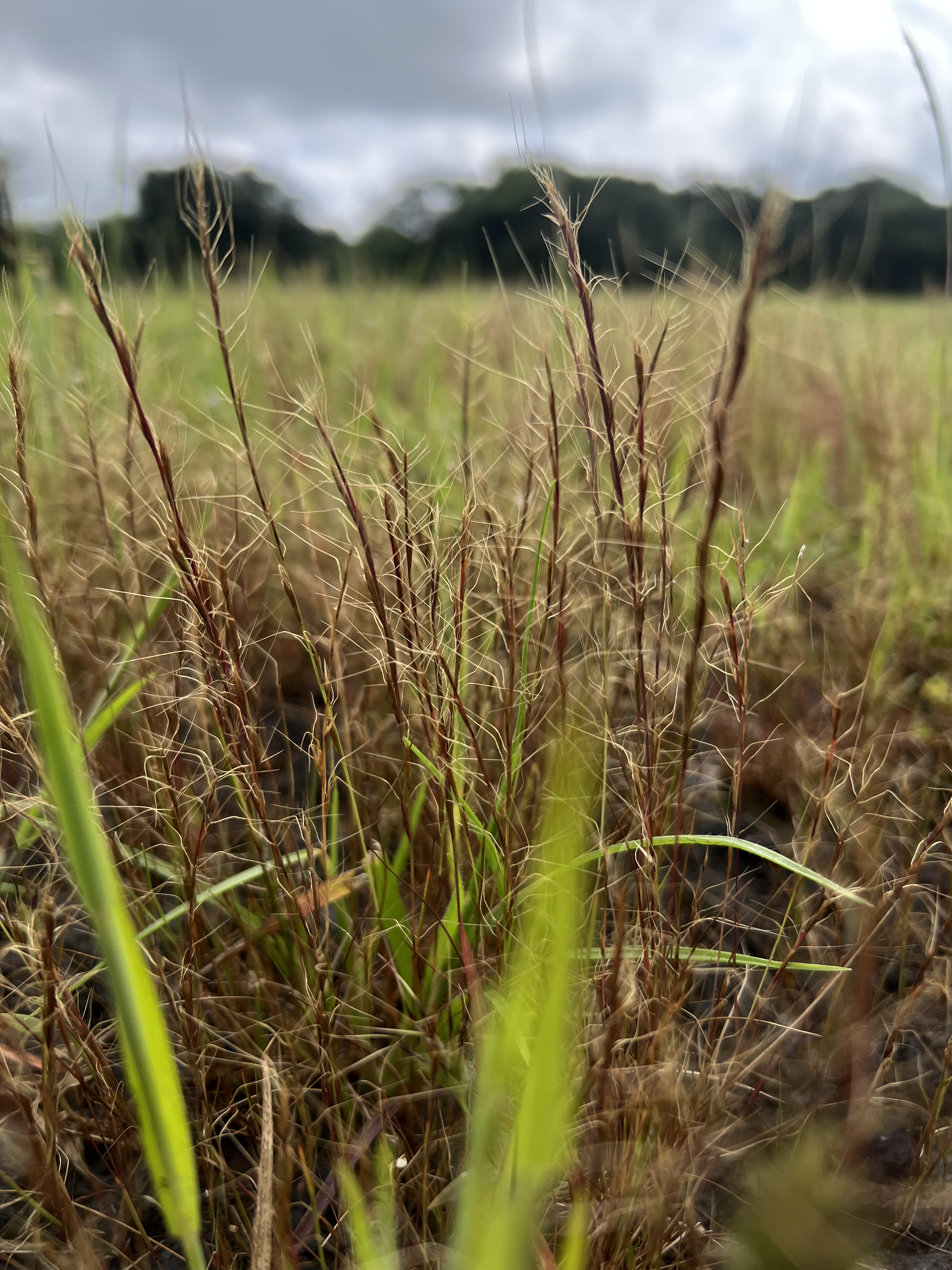

Conservation status
- Least Concern (IUCN 3.1)

Scientific classification
- Kingdom: Plantae
- Clade: Tracheophytes
- Clade: Angiosperms
- Clade: Monocots
- Clade: Commelinids
- Order: Poales
- Family: Poaceae
- Subfamily: Chloridoideae
- Genus: Indopoa; Bor
- Species: I. paupercula

Binomial name
- Indopoa paupercula (Stapf) Bor

Synonyms
- Tripogon pauperculus Stapf; Tripogon pauperulus Stapf, alternate spelling

= Indopoa =

Genus of grasses

Indopoa is a genus of Indian plants in the grass family. The only known species is Indopoa paupercula, native to Maharashtra and Karnataka in India.

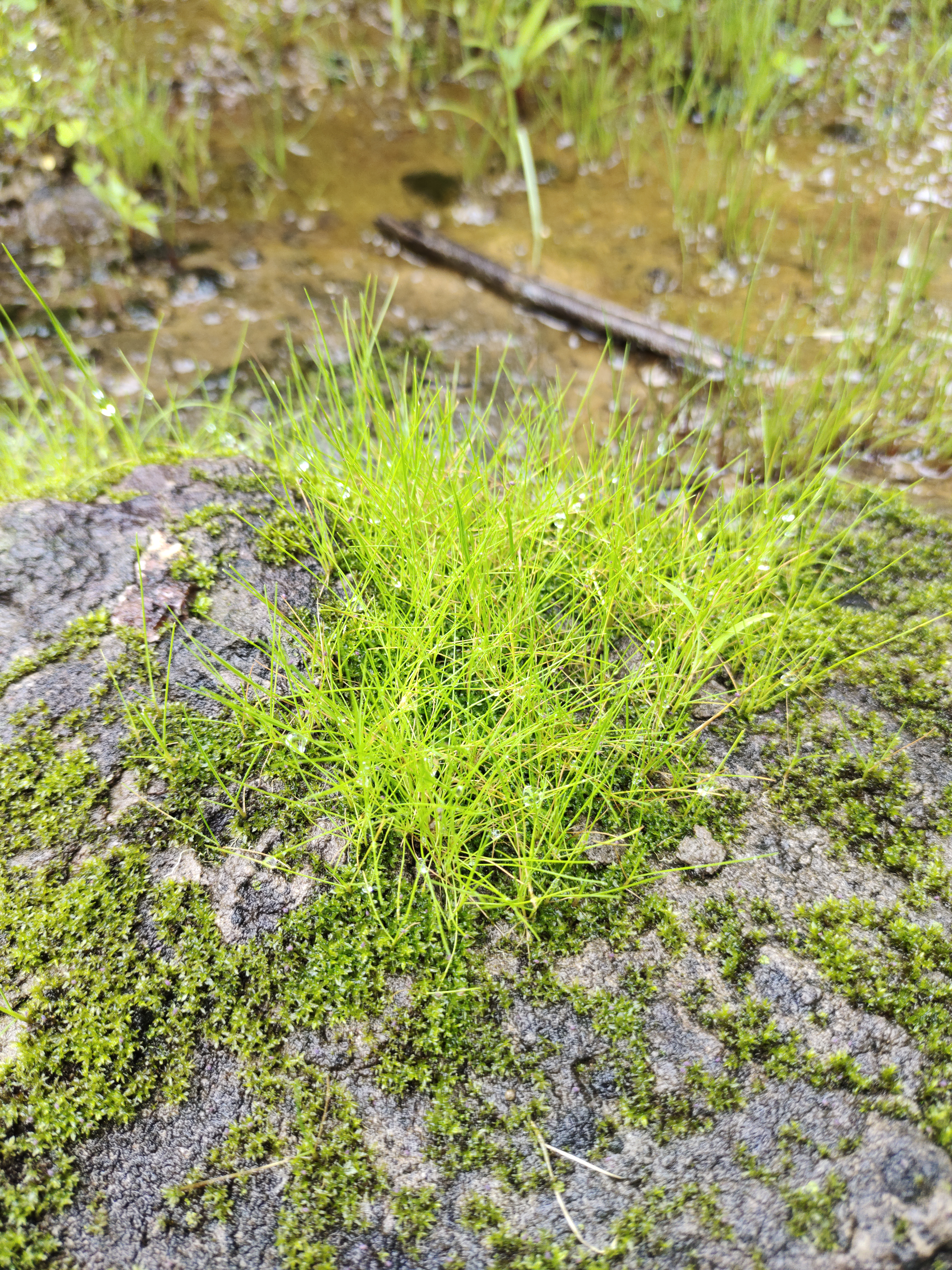
Habit of Indopoa paupercula (Stapf) Bor in the Western Ghats of India.
