= Chandwad =

Chandwad Chandvad
- Town
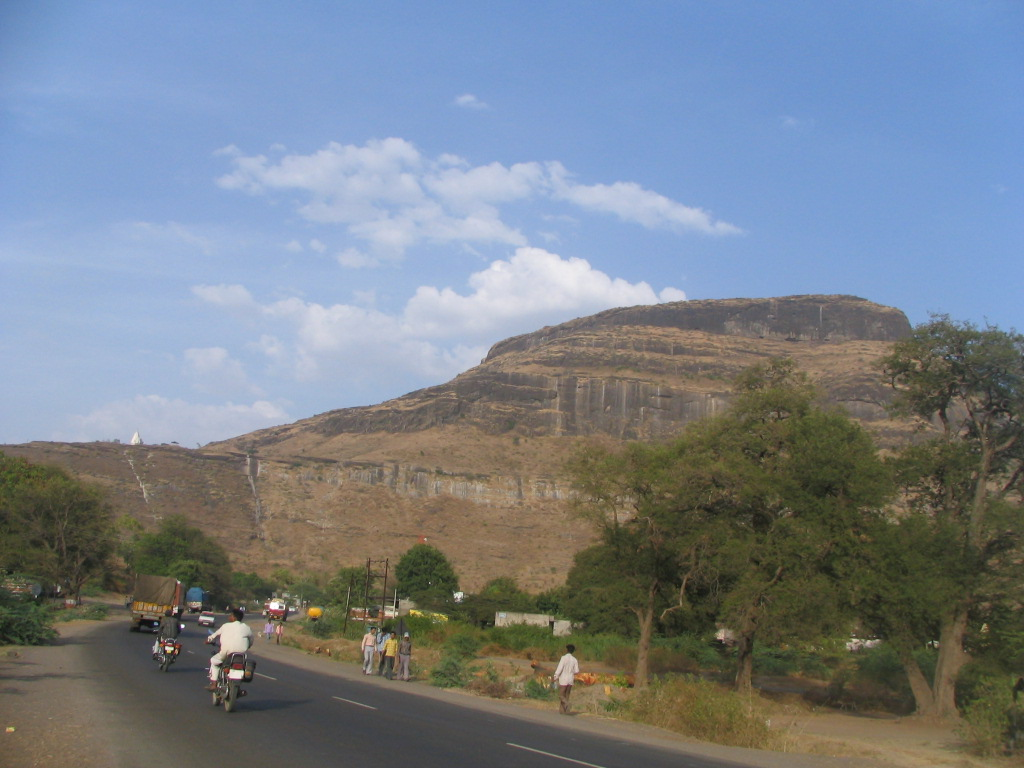
- National Highway 3 at Chandwad

- Location in Maharashtra, India
- Coordinates: 20°19′45″N 74°14′40″E
- Country: India
- State: Maharashtra
- District: Nashik

Population
  - Total: 25,341
- Demonym: Chandwadkar

Language
  - Official: Marathi
- Time zone: UTC+5:30 (IST)
- PIN: 423101
- Vehicle registration: MH-15
- Nearest city: Nashik
- Website: https://www.chandwadtaluka.com

Chandwad (IPA:Cāndavaḍa) is a town located in Nashik district of Maharashtra, India. It is 250 km from Mumbai. The 11th-century Jain Caves, Renuka devi mandir, Chandreshwar temple and Rangmahal are in Chandwad.

Chandwad is a tehsil of Nashik district in Maharashtra, India. It is the site of Ahilyadevi Holkar's Rangmahal (fort). It is surrounded by mountains and resembles a hill station. The population is around 20000. Chandwad is also well known for its 11th-century Jain caves dedicated to Tirthankara Chandraprabh situated near a hill. It has special importance for Jains. Jain people living in Chandwad city believe that the place was once the famous and a big center of Jainism.

== History ==
Rishi Parashurama was asked by his father Jamadagni (known for his anger) to kill his mother Renuka. Parashurama, being an obedient son, separated her head from body. The head landed in Chandwad while the body fell near Mahur. There is a scenic temple of Goddess Renuka on the outskirts of Chandwad. Similarly there are temples of Ganesh, Mahadeo (Chandreshwar) and Goddess Kalika, the last two being on mountains.

Chandreshwar Mahadev Temple was built by King Chandradev about 2100 years ago and worshiped Lord Shiva. The Shiva temple Chandreshwar is located on the north-east mountain. There were seven 'Shaiv Gosavis' looking after the temple as well performing the rituals at the temple. After the death, their bodies were buried near a lake on the mountain of Chandreshwaras per Shaiv Gosavi tradition at that time. Later on their tombs were termed as SaptRishi by local people. Near that lake 'Ganesh Taka' is another source of water.

Story of Vikramaditya's SadeSati (Period of Saturn) is associated with Chandwad. In his bad time he wandered through the jungles of Tamolindapur (Chandwad) and later on he came in the town after a long period so it was difficult to prove his kingship to anyone. He started doing job at a grocery shop but the shopkeeper and his daughter blamed him of stealing the jewellery. He got punished as he failed to prove his innocence. His hands and legs were broken but he got job at an oil extractor's workplace where he has to keep the bull moving on the extractor mechanism. One day he was singing Song of 'Deepak Raga' and due to his songs all the lamps turned on. The daughter of Chandradev had a resolution to marry a man who knows 'Deepak Raga' and then he revealed his identity and married the daughter of King Chandradev.

Rangmahal, a fortress-like structure was built by Queen Ahilyadevi Holkar, a very pious lady, devotee of Lord Shiva, who did charity and service in building Shiva temples and facilities for the public. She constructed a lake for the people in Chandwad.

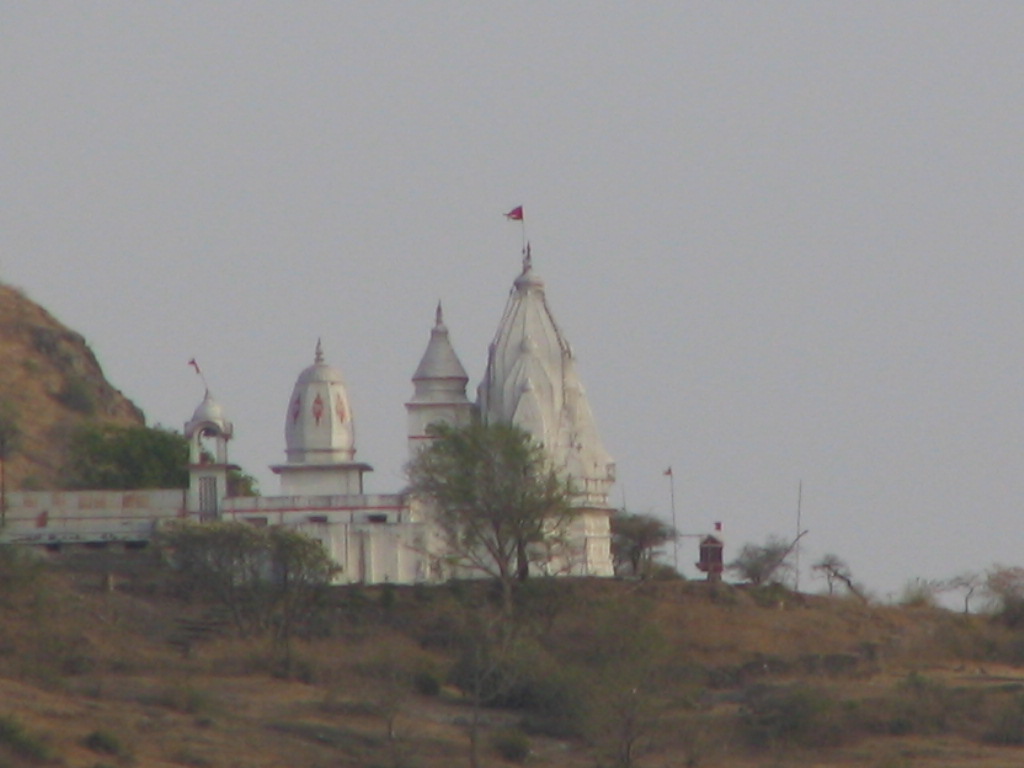
Chandwad-Chandrashwer Temple closeup

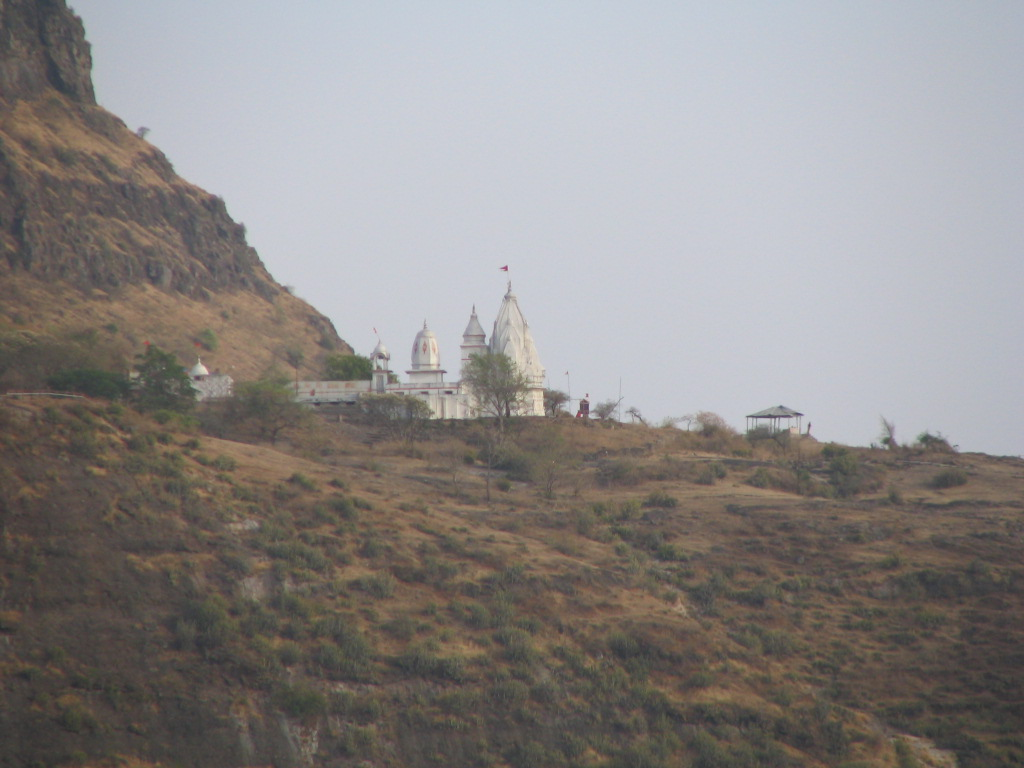
Chandwad-Chandrashwer Temple

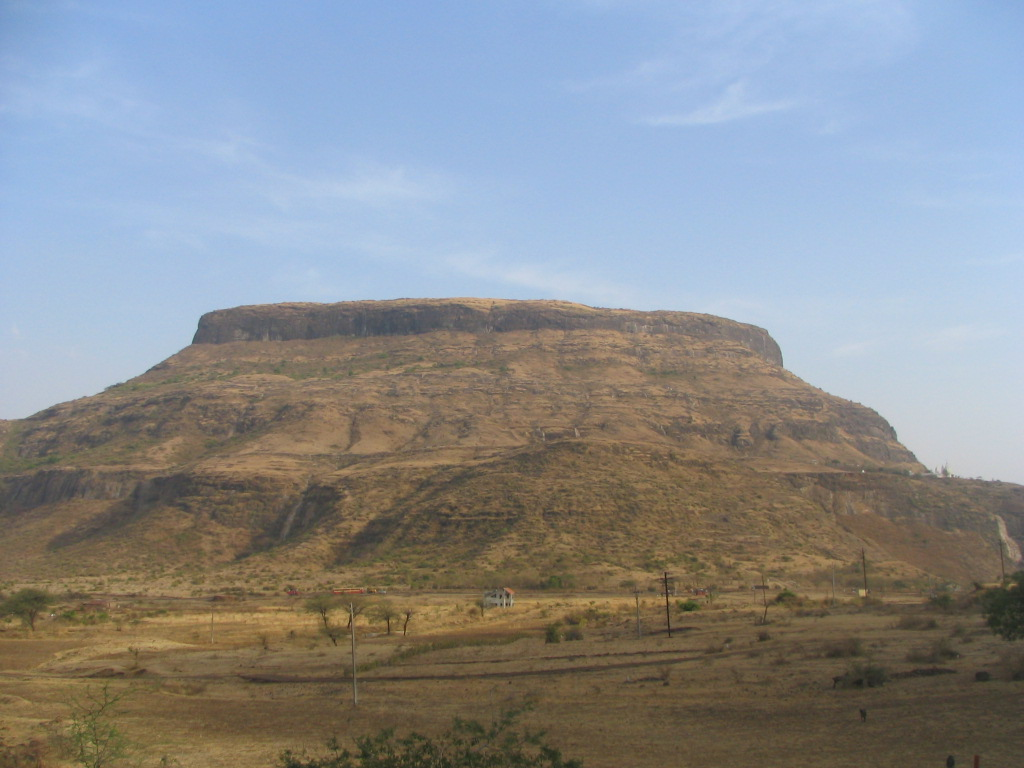
Hills near Chandwad

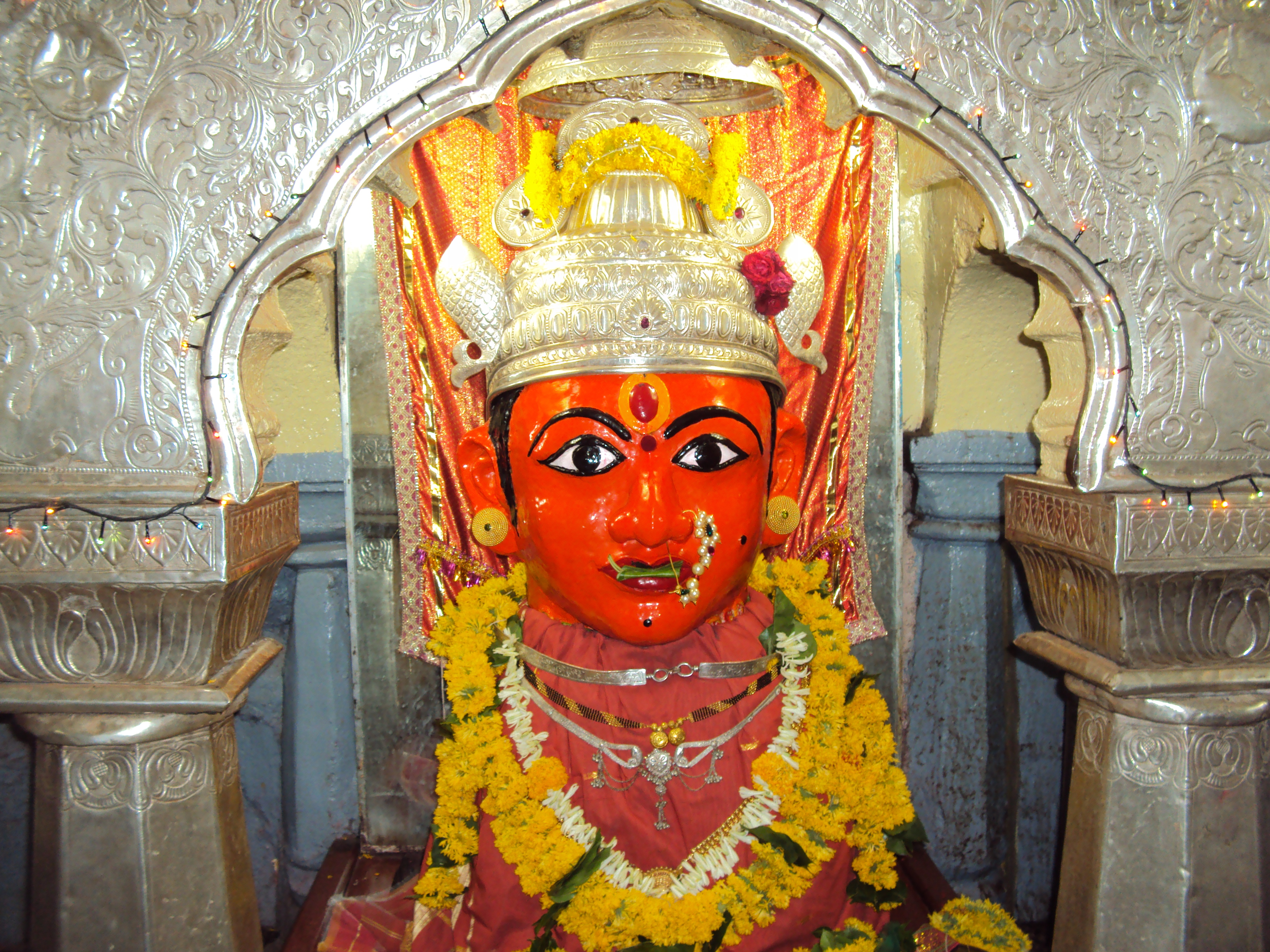
Goddess Renuka Devi

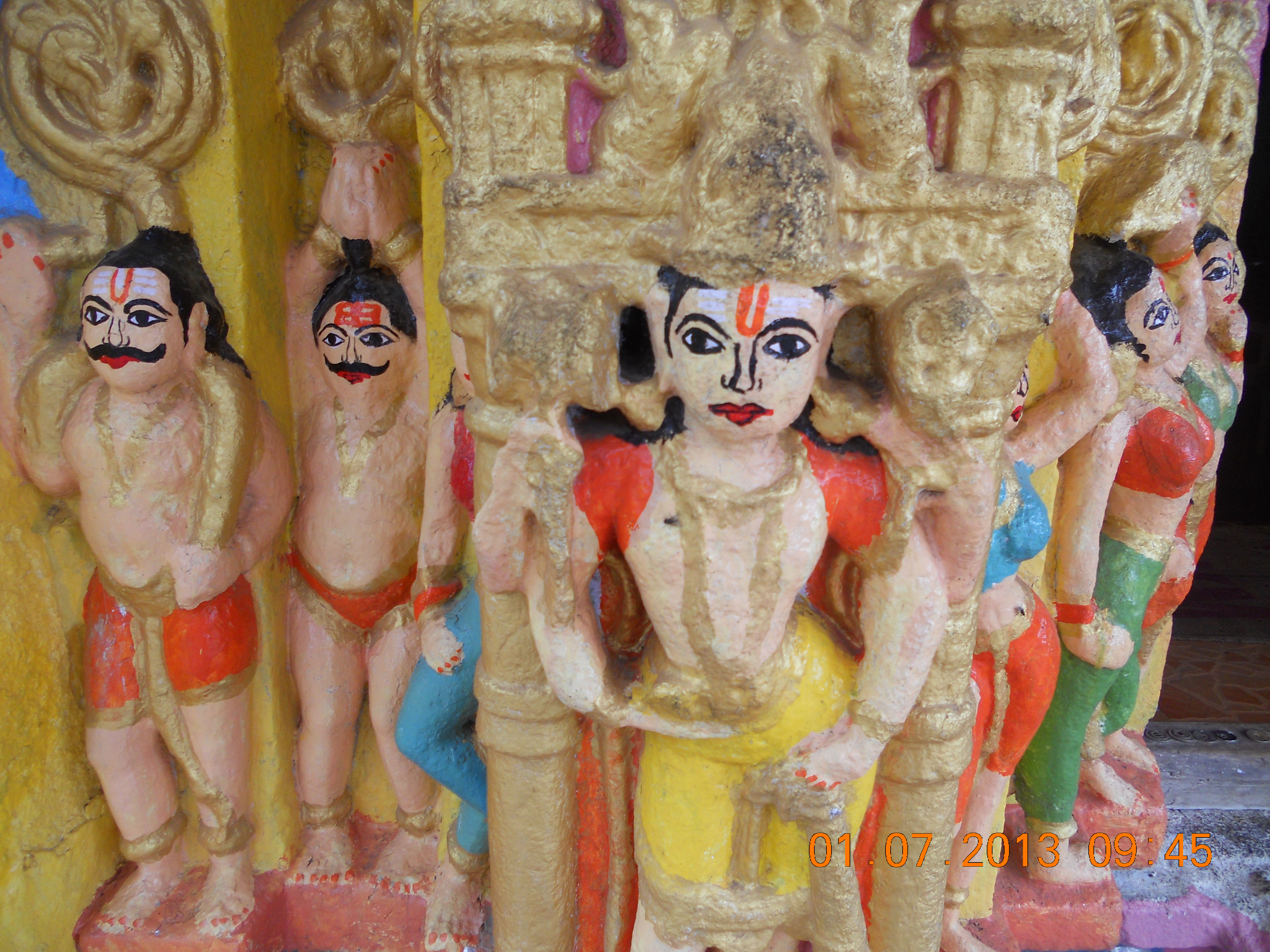
Work on Chandreswar temple

== Geography ==
The city is located on NH-3 (famous as Mumbai-Agara Road) between Pimpalgaon Baswant and Malegaon. The main attraction of the city are Rangmahal (fort built by Ahilyadevi Holkar) and an adjoining well. The Rangmahal now houses many government offices, and a government school. Mrs. Holkar also built a famous network of subways from her palace to different popular locations like Goddess Renuka Temple and a well near Vinchur. They were supposed to be used as safe passage under enemy attack. Mrs. Ahilyadevi Holkar made a road from Indore (Indur in Marathi) to Trimbakeshwar, which is now part of NH-3. The Holkars were appointed as key Jahagirdaar by the Peshwas. The road was an important trade and travel link between Indore to Trimbakeshwar, with onward link to Pune originating from Malegaon City.

The town boasts cosmopolitan culture, and amity. Ganeshotsav is an important festival for the town, and is celebrated at the town level. The town had many handlooms, which vanished after 1970. The state highway from Vinchur (district Nashik) to Prakasha (district Dhule) crosses NH-3 in this town. The other state highway originates from Chandwad to Manmad and further to Nandgaon. This town acts as a gateway for traffic from the north part of Nashik district to Ahmadnagar and Aurangabad, and especially to Manmad Rail station. As a result, the town has significant traffic and allied trade (transport, hotels and garages).

== Education ==
The SNJb's College Of Engineering is one of the most important educational centres of the town and one of the most famous college in Nashik district.

Campus also has a BHMS College, a Pharmacy College and a Polytechnic college.

== Places to visit ==
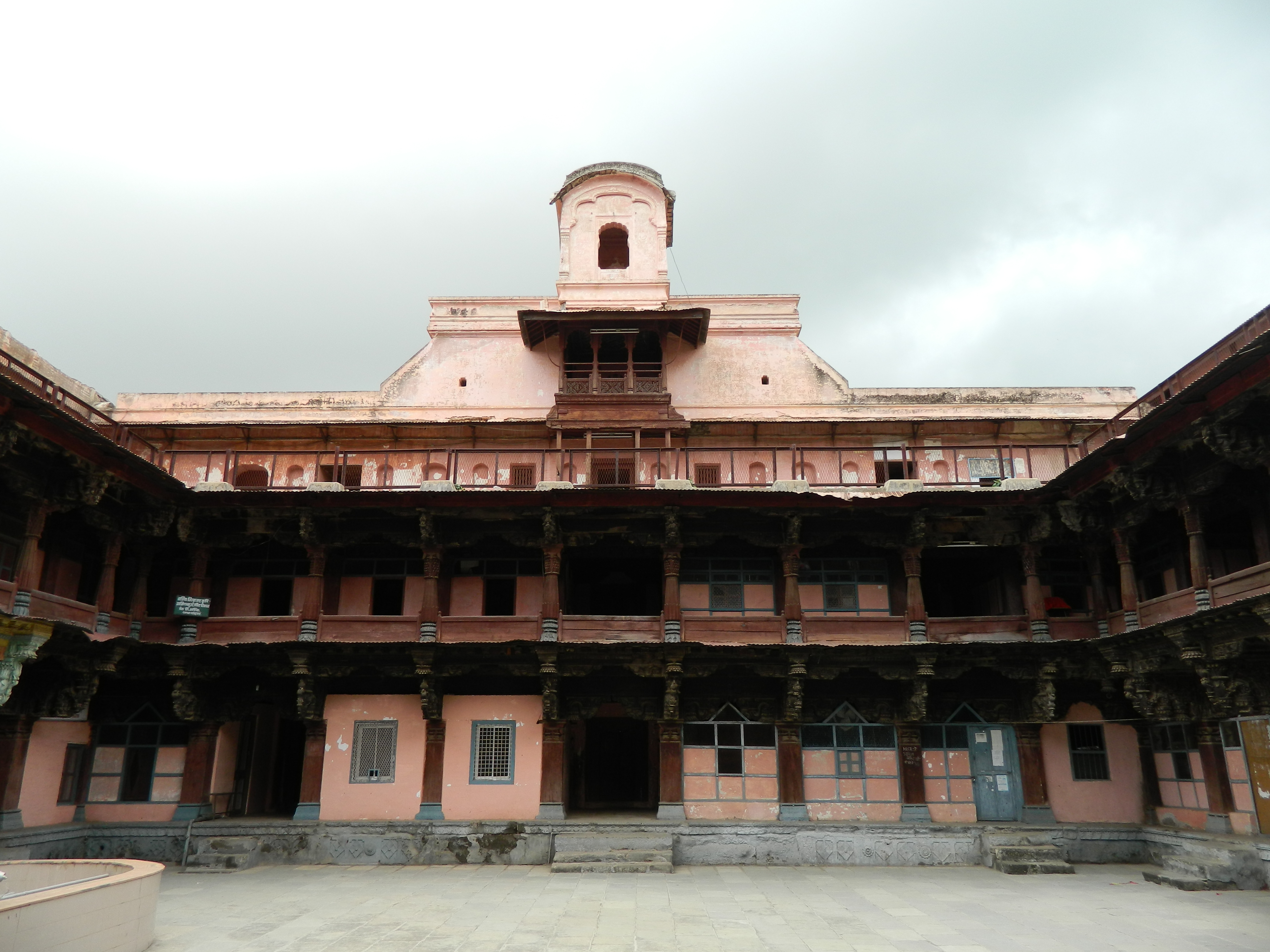
Rang Mahal palace, also known as Holkar Wada.

- 11th-century Jain caves
- Rangmahal (Holkar Wada)
- Indrai Fort
- Temple of Renuka Mata
- Nanavali Dargah Sharif
- Temple of Chandreshwar (Shankar Bhagwan)
- Jummanshah Bukhari Dargah Sharif
- Ganesh Mandir (Vadbaare) (ichhapurti mandir)
- Temple of Shani Dev
- Shree kachrnath swami maharaj mandir at Bhoyegaon village near Chandwad
- Bhairavnath Temple (near Petrol Pump Square)
- Kalika Mata mandir and Mahavir Caves
- Chandreshwar Temple (Mahadev Mandir on top of mountain)
- Rahud Dam And Khoakad lake
- Fort Rajdher, Fort Koldher, Indrayi Fort and Chandwad Fort
- Dhodap Fort
- Kedrai Devasthan (just 2.1 km on NH3 through Vadali Bhoi)
