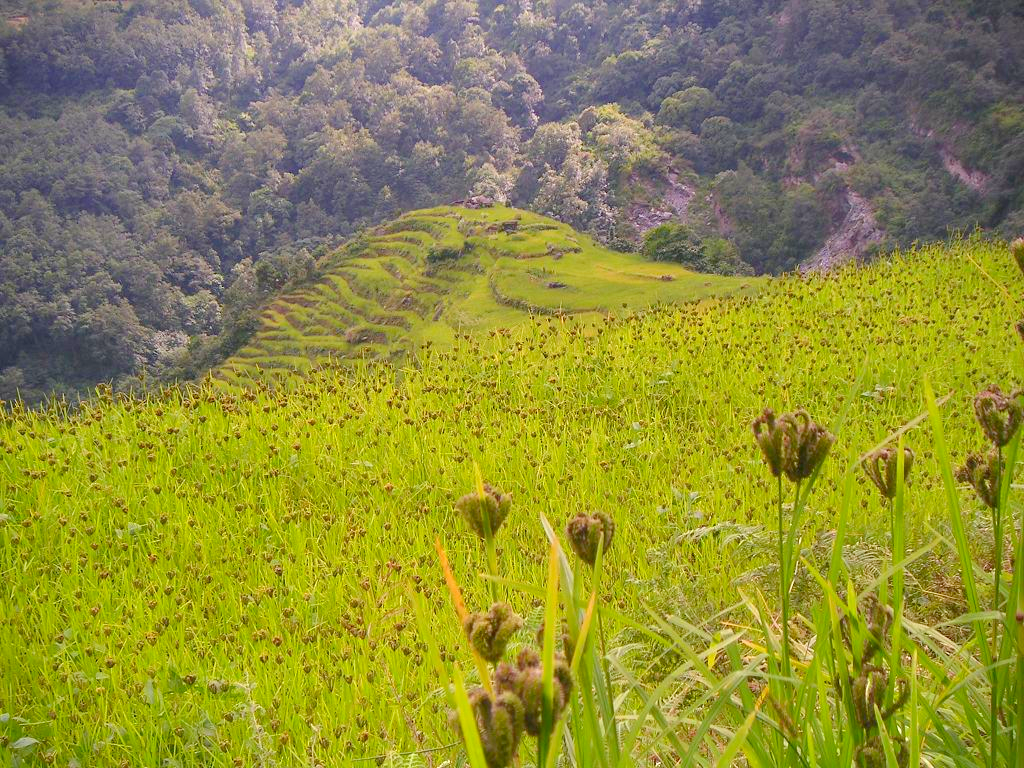
- Finger millet (Eleusine coracana) in Nepal

Scientific classification
- Kingdom: Plantae
- Clade: Tracheophytes
- Clade: Angiosperms
- Clade: Monocots
- Clade: Commelinids
- Order: Poales
- Family: Poaceae
- Clade: PACMAD clade
- Subfamily: Chloridoideae; Kunth ex Beilschm.

Tribes
- Centropodieae; Cynodonteae; Eragrostideae; Triraphideae; Zoysieae

= Chloridoideae =

Subfamily of plants

Chloridoideae is one of the largest subfamilies of grasses, with roughly 150 genera and 1,600 species, mainly found in arid tropical or subtropical grasslands. Within the PACMAD clade, their sister group is the Danthonioideae. The subfamily includes widespread weeds such as Bermuda grass (Cynodon dactylon), goosegrass (Eleusine indica) or finger grass (Chloris), but also millet species grown in some tropical regions, namely finger millet (Eleusine coracana) and teff (Eragrostis tef).

With the exception of some species in Ellisochloa and Eleusine indica, most of the subfamily's species use the C_{4} photosynthetic pathway. The first evolutionary transition from C_{3} to C_{4} photosynthesis in the grasses probably occurred in this subfamily, around 32 to 25 million years ago in the Oligocene.

== Phylogeny ==
Relationships of tribes in the Chloridoideae according to a 2017 phylogenetic classification, also showing the Danthonioideae as sister group:

- Danthonioideae
- Chloridoideae
  - Centropodieae
  - - Triraphideae
    - - Eragrostideae
      - - Cynodonteae
        - Zoysieae

The following genera have not been assigned to a tribe:

- Gossweilerochloa
- Indopoa
- Lepturopetium
- Myriostachya
- Pogonochloa
- Pseudozoysia
- Silentvalleya
