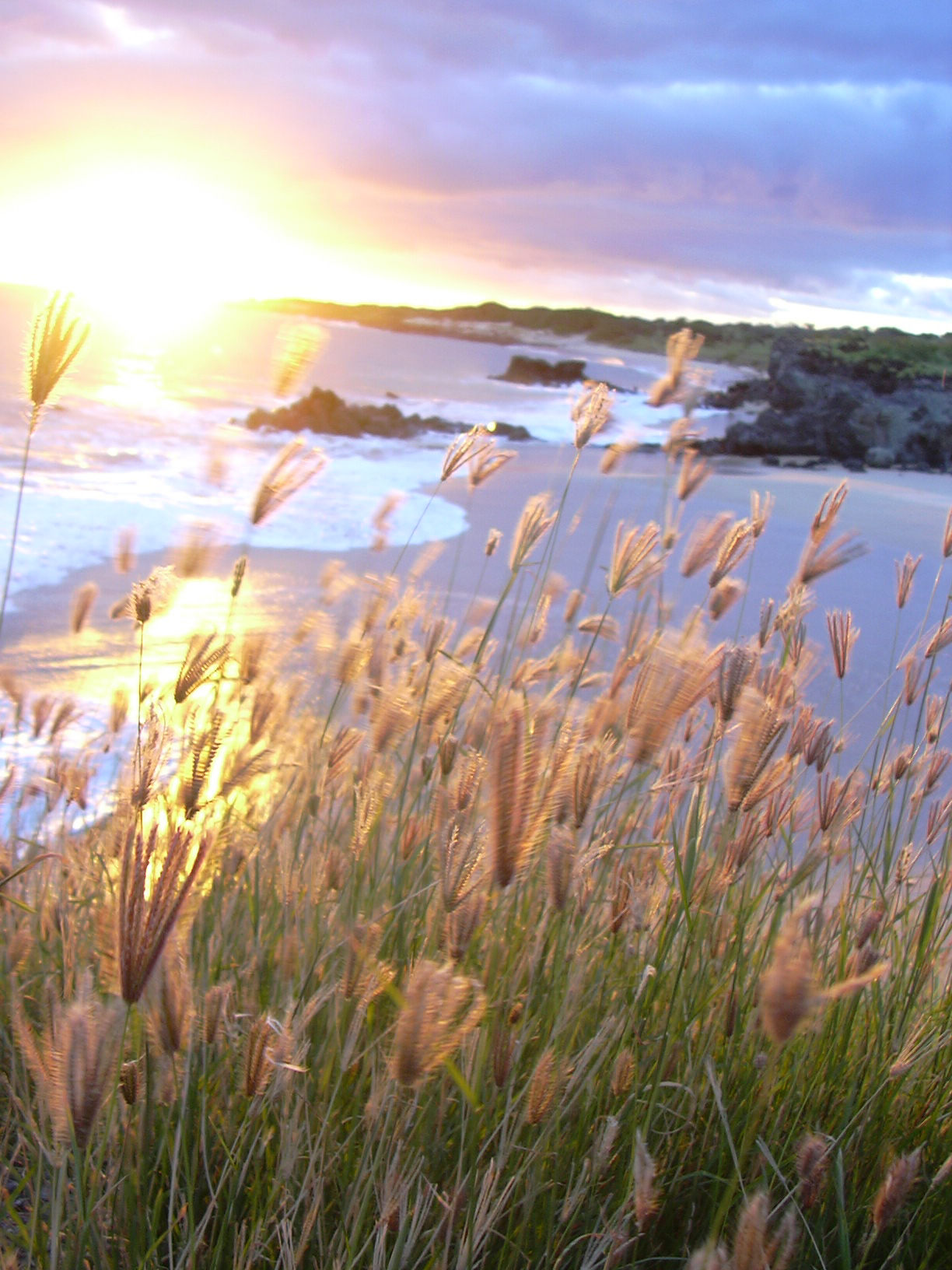
- Chloris virgata

Scientific classification
- Kingdom: Plantae
- Clade: Tracheophytes
- Clade: Angiosperms
- Clade: Monocots
- Clade: Commelinids
- Order: Poales
- Family: Poaceae
- Subfamily: Chloridoideae
- Tribe: Cynodonteae
- Subtribe: Eleusininae
- Genus: Chloris; Sw.

Type species
- Chloris cruciata (L.) Sw.

Synonyms
- Agrostomia Cerv.; Chlorostis Raf.; Joannegria Chiov.; Lintonia Stapf; Negria Chiov., nom. illeg.; Ochthochloa Edgew.; Pterochloris (A.Camus) A.Camus

= Chloris (plant) =

Genus of grasses

Chloris is a widespread genus of monophyletic grasses belonging to the family Poaceae, known generally as windmill grass or finger grass. The genus is found worldwide, but especially in the tropical and subtropical regions, and more often in the Southern Hemisphere. The species are variable in morphology, but in general, the plants are less than 0.5 m in height. They bear inflorescences shaped like umbels, with several plumes lined with rows of spikelets. The genus is characterized by the series of sterile florets above the lowest fertile ones, spikes usually 4–10 in numbers (occasionally 1–2), approximated or in a slightly separated series of 10–20 spikes, rarely an indefinite numbers of terminal spikes (then usually up to 50 or rarely more, as seen in Chloris roxburghiana Schultes). In India, 11 species are known to occur in which only two are endemic viz. Chloris wightiana Nees ex Steud. and Chloris bournei Rangachariar & Tadulingam.

The genus was named for Chloris of Greek myth, a figure associated with flowers and spring.

== Species ==
53 species are currently accepted.

- Chloris affinis Caro & E.A.Sánchez
- Chloris amethystea Hochst.
- Chloris andropogonoides E.Fourn. – slimspike windmill grass
- Chloris arenaria Hitchc. & Ekman
- Chloris barbata Sw. – swollen fingergrass
- Chloris berazainiae Catasús
- Chloris boliviensis Renvoize
- Chloris bournei Rang. & Tadul.
- Chloris burmensis D.E.Anderson
- Chloris castilloniana Parodi
- Chloris circumfontinalis Fahey & Fensham
- Chloris clementis Merr.
- Chloris cruciata (L.) Sw.
- Chloris cubensis Hitchc. & Ekman
- Chloris cucullata Bisch. – hooded windmill grass
- Chloris diluta Renvoize
- Chloris divaricata R.Br. – spreading windmill grass
- Chloris ekmanii Hitchc.
- Chloris filiformis (Vahl) Poir.
- Chloris flabellata (Hack.) Launert
- Chloris flagellifera (Nees) P.M.Peterson
- Chloris formosana (Honda) Keng
- Chloris gayana Kunth – Rhodes grass
- Chloris halophila Parodi
- Chloris humbertiana A.Camus
- Chloris jubaensis Cope
- Chloris lobata Lazarides
- Chloris mensensis (Schweinf.) Cufod.
- Chloris montana Roxb.
- Chloris mossambicensis K.Schum.
- Chloris nutans (Stapf) P.M.Peterson
- Chloris orthonoton Döll
- Chloris paniculata Scribn.
- Chloris pectinata Benth. – comb windmill grass
- Chloris pilosa Schumach.
- Chloris pumilio R.Br.
- Chloris pycnothrix R.Br. – spiderweb chloris
- Chloris quinquesetica Bhide
- Chloris radiata (L.) Sw.
- Chloris robusta Stapf
- Chloris ruahensis Renvoize
- Chloris rufescens Lag.
- Chloris sagrana A.Rich. – roadside windmill grass
- Chloris sesquiflora Burkart
- Chloris × subdolichostachya Müll.Hal.
- Chloris submutica Kunth – Mexican windmill grass
- Chloris suringarii Hitchc.
- Chloris texensis Nash
- Chloris truncata R.Br. – Australian fingergrass, black windmill grass
- Chloris ventricosa R.Br. – Australian windmill grass, plump windmill grass
- Chloris verticillata Nutt. – tumble windmill grass
- Chloris virgata Sw. – feather fingergrass
- Chloris wightiana Nees ex Steud.
- Chloris woodii Renvoize

=== Formerly placed here ===
Some species formerly placed in genus Chloris are now placed in other genera, including Aegopogon, Austrochloris, Bouteloua, Chondrosum, Chrysochloa, Ctenium, Cynodon, Dactyloctenium, Daknopholis, Disakisperma, Eleusine, Enteropogon, Eustachys, Gymnopogon, Harpochloa, Leptochloa, Oxychloris, Pseudopogonatherum, Schoenefeldia, Schoenefeldiella, Tetrapogon, and Trichloris.

- Daknopholis boivinii (A.Camus) Clayton (as Chloris boivinii A.Camus)
- Schoenefeldiella transiens (Pilg.) P.M.Peterson (as Chloris transiens Pilg.)
- Stapfochloa elata (Desv.) P.M.Peterson (as Chloris elata Desv.) – tall windmill grass
