= Anthopogon =

Anthopogon may refer to two different genera of plants:

- Anthopogon Nutt., a taxonomic synonym for Gymnopogon, the skeletongrasses
- Anthopogon Neck. ex Raf., a taxonomic synonym for Gentianopsis, a genus in the gentian family Gentianaceae
