= Chloris texensis =

Conservation status
- Imperiled (NatureServe)

Scientific classification
- Kingdom: Plantae
- Clade: Tracheophytes
- Clade: Angiosperms
- Clade: Monocots
- Clade: Commelinids
- Order: Poales
- Family: Poaceae
- Subfamily: Chloridoideae
- Genus: Chloris
- Species: C. texensis

Binomial name
- Chloris texensis Nash

Species of grass

Chloris texensis is a species of grass known by the common name Texas windmill grass. It is endemic to Texas in the United States, where it occurs on the coastal prairies.

This perennial grass forms clumps of stems up to 30 to 45 centimeters tall. The leaf blades are up to 15 centimeters long. The inflorescence is a panicle with several long, spreading branches arranged in a whorl. Each branch is up to 20 centimeters long and has 3 to 4 spikelets per centimeter along the distal part. Flowering occurs in October and November.

This plant grows on sparsely vegetated stretches of coastal prairie, often at mima mounds. Other plants located around these mounds include Hymenoxys texana, Thurovia triflora, and Rayjacksonia aurea. It may also be associated with the rare Machaeranthera aurea.

This plant is threatened with the loss of its habitat due to development, especially in the Houston area.
