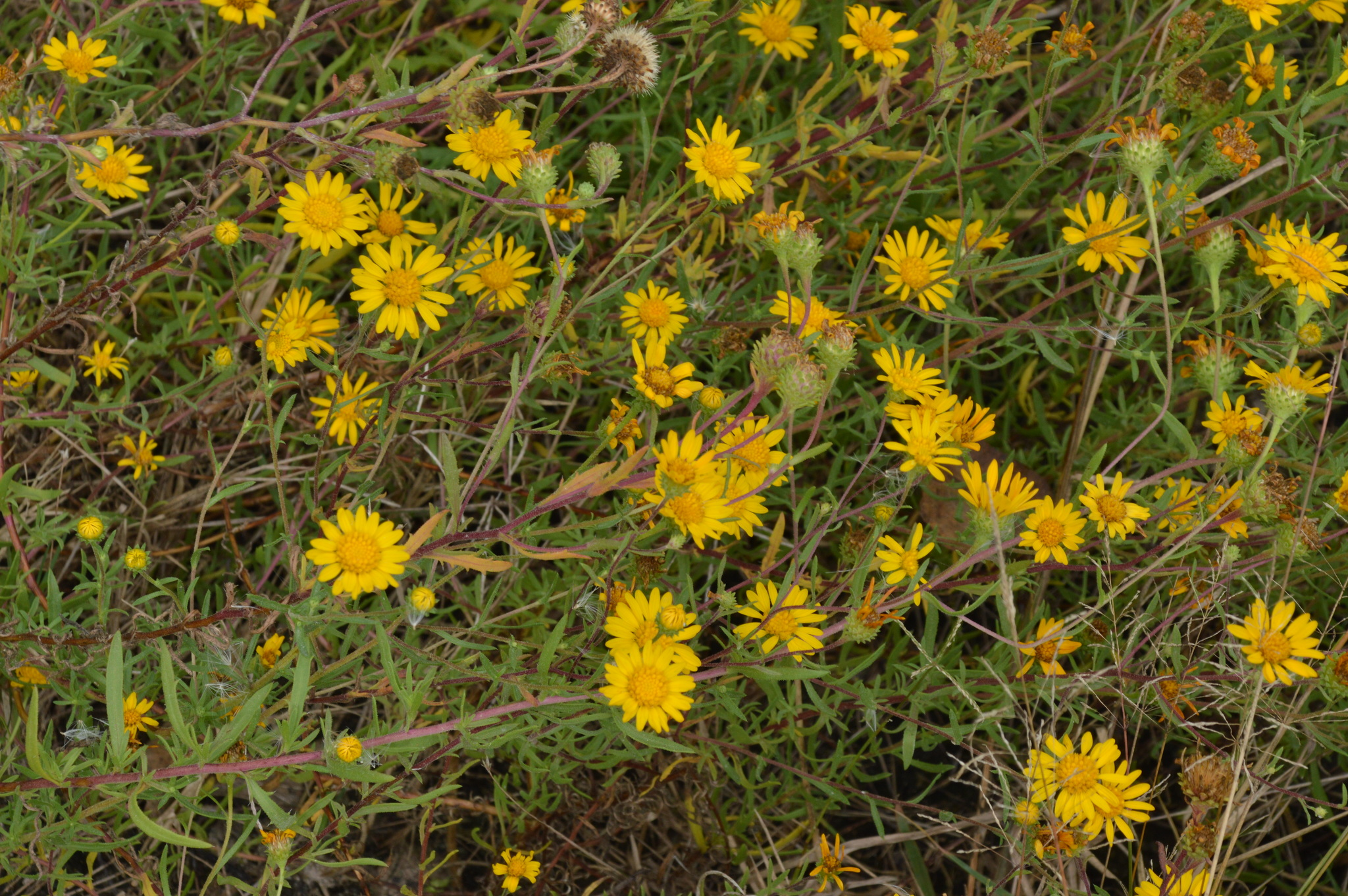

Conservation status
- Critically Imperiled (NatureServe)

Scientific classification
- Kingdom: Plantae
- Clade: Tracheophytes
- Clade: Angiosperms
- Clade: Eudicots
- Clade: Asterids
- Order: Asterales
- Family: Asteraceae
- Genus: Rayjacksonia
- Species: R. aurea

Binomial name
- Rayjacksonia aurea (A.Gray) R.L.Hartm. & M.A.Lane

Synonyms
- Machaeranthera aurea

= Rayjacksonia aurea =

Species of flowering plant

Rayjacksonia aurea is a species of flowering plant in the family Asteraceae known by the common names Houston tansyaster and Houston camphor daisy. It is endemic to Texas in the United States, where it is known only from the Houston area. It is limited to Galveston and Harris Counties.

== Description ==
This species is an annual herb which generally remains small in its native habitat but in cultivation may be much larger. It grows from a taproot. The small leaves are linear or lance-shaped and just a few millimeters wide. The flower heads contain several yellow ray florets which may reach nearly a centimeter in length. The plant has a scent like camphor. Flowering occurs in October and November.

== Distribution and habitat ==
This plant grows on the Texas coastal prairie, especially on Mima mounds and in open areas such as fields and pastures. It prefers sandy soils or loams, and typically grows in areas that are seasonally wet or are poorly drained. The plant may occur with other rare local endemics, such as Texas windmill grass and prairie dawn.

== Conservation ==
The species is currently classified as imperiled, and fewer than 20 populations remain. The species and its habitat are threatened by development and expansion of the Houston metropolitan area, as well as from competition from woody vegetation and non-native grasses.
