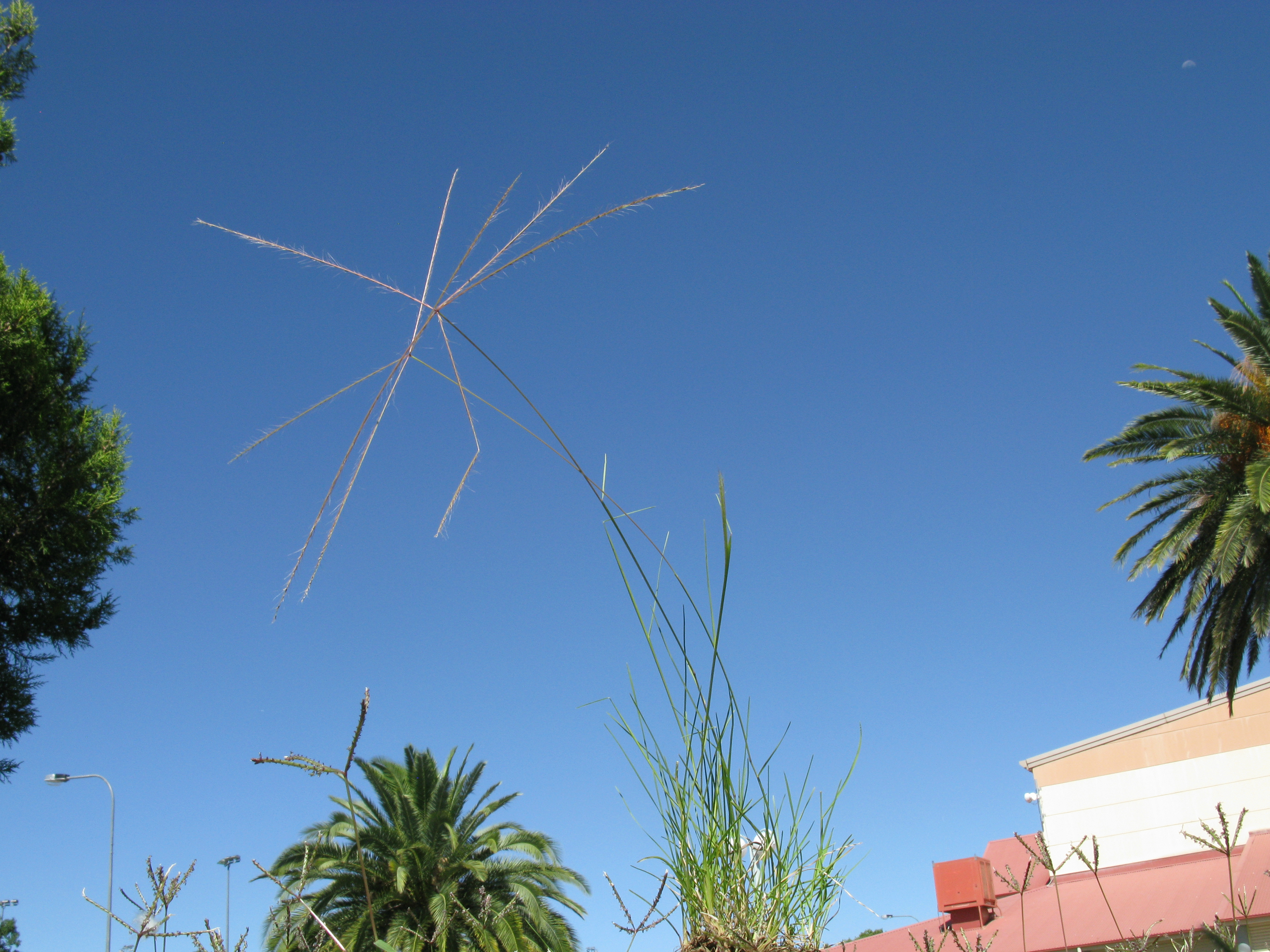

Scientific classification
- Kingdom: Plantae
- Clade: Embryophytes
- Clade: Tracheophytes
- Clade: Spermatophytes
- Clade: Angiosperms
- Clade: Monocots
- Clade: Commelinids
- Order: Poales
- Family: Poaceae
- Subfamily: Chloridoideae
- Genus: Chloris
- Species: C. divaricata

Binomial name
- Chloris divaricata R.Br.
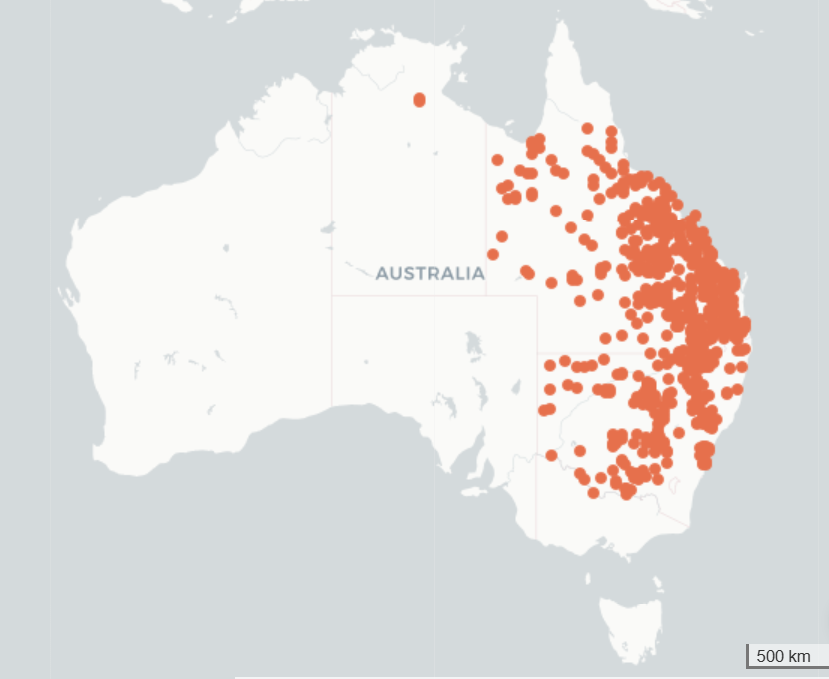
- Occurrence of Chloris divaricata in Australia

= Chloris divaricata =

Slender chloris

Species of flowering plant

Chloris divaricata, the slender chloris, is a perennial grass species native to Australia. A member of the family Poaceae and order Poales, it typically grows in dense tussocks and produces a distinctive flowering head of several slender spikes arranged in a spreading, star-like or windmill-shaped pattern. The species is widely distributed mostly throughout inland and coastal New South Wales and Queensland, recognised for its resilience and value in soil stabilisation and land rehabilitation. Other names include star grass, Dog's tooth star grass, spreading windmill grass, and small chloris.

== Description and life history ==
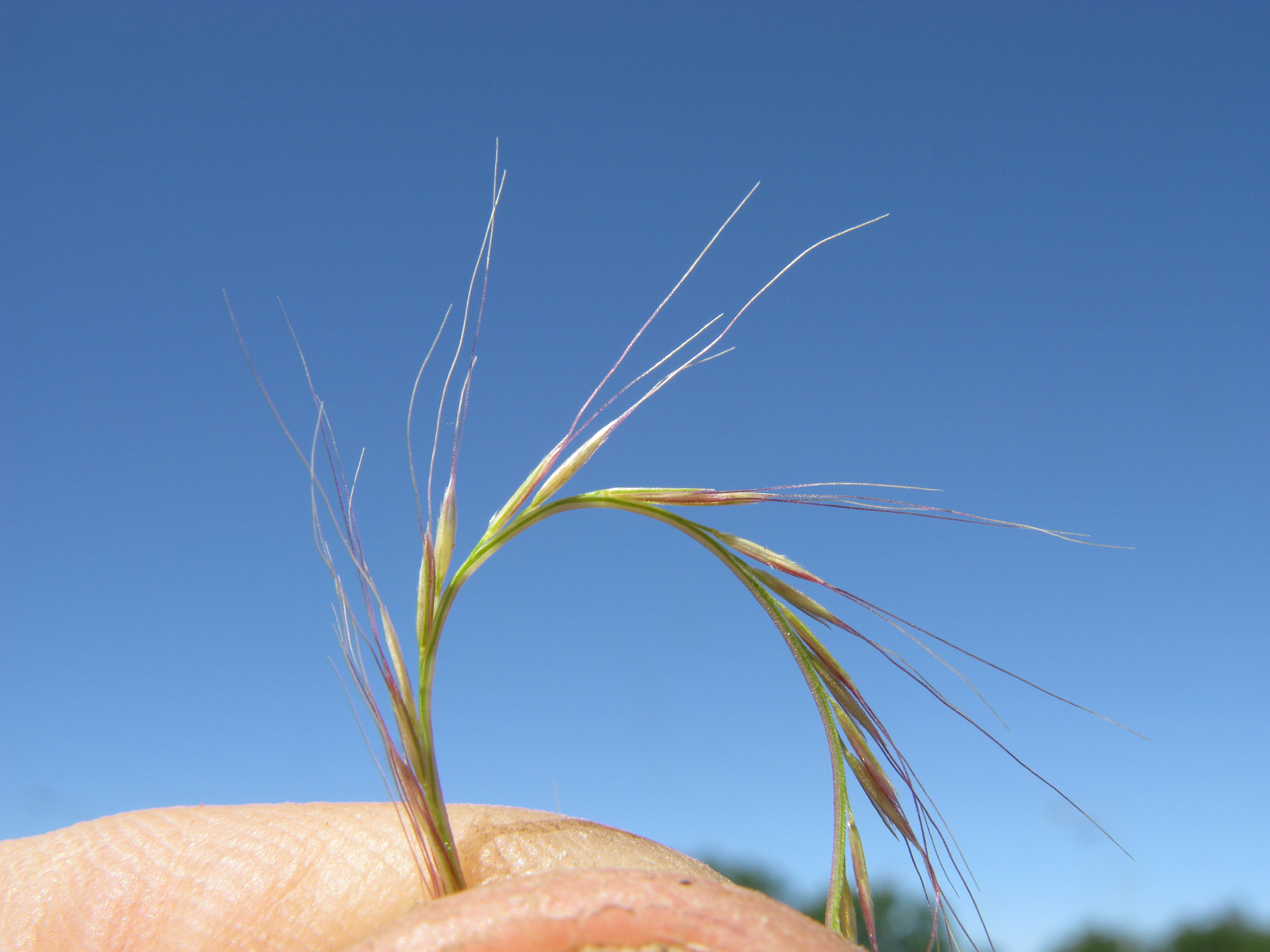
Spikelets

C. divaricata is a perennial grass that grows in compact clumps, although it may spread locally through short stolons that run along the ground and produce new shoots and roots, forming interconnected plants. The stem is erect from the kneed base, unbranched or only branched in the lower part. Plants usually reach 20–50 cm (8–20 in) high with smooth and hairless leaf sheaths wrapped around the stem and a small fringe of hairs forming at the ligule. The leaves are narrow, up to 15 cm (6 in) long and 1.0–1.5 mm (0.04–0.06 in) wide, with surfaces ranging from smooth to slightly rough.

The inflorescence comprises flexible spikes. or digitate racemes fanning out from a central point, like a windmill. Divaricata from the Latin divarico, "to spread out", describes this fashion in which the grasses grow, referring to the distinctive horizontal spreading arrangement. Upon each raceme are small clusters of spearhead-shaped spikelets attached singly, slightly overlapping (imbricate) Each spikelet is 4 mm (0.16 in) long and contains a fertile bisexual floret capable of producing seed and smaller sterile floret. The fertile floret is enclosed by a lemma, the tip of which extends into a long bristle or awn. Reproduction occurs through seed production and vegetative spread via stolons.

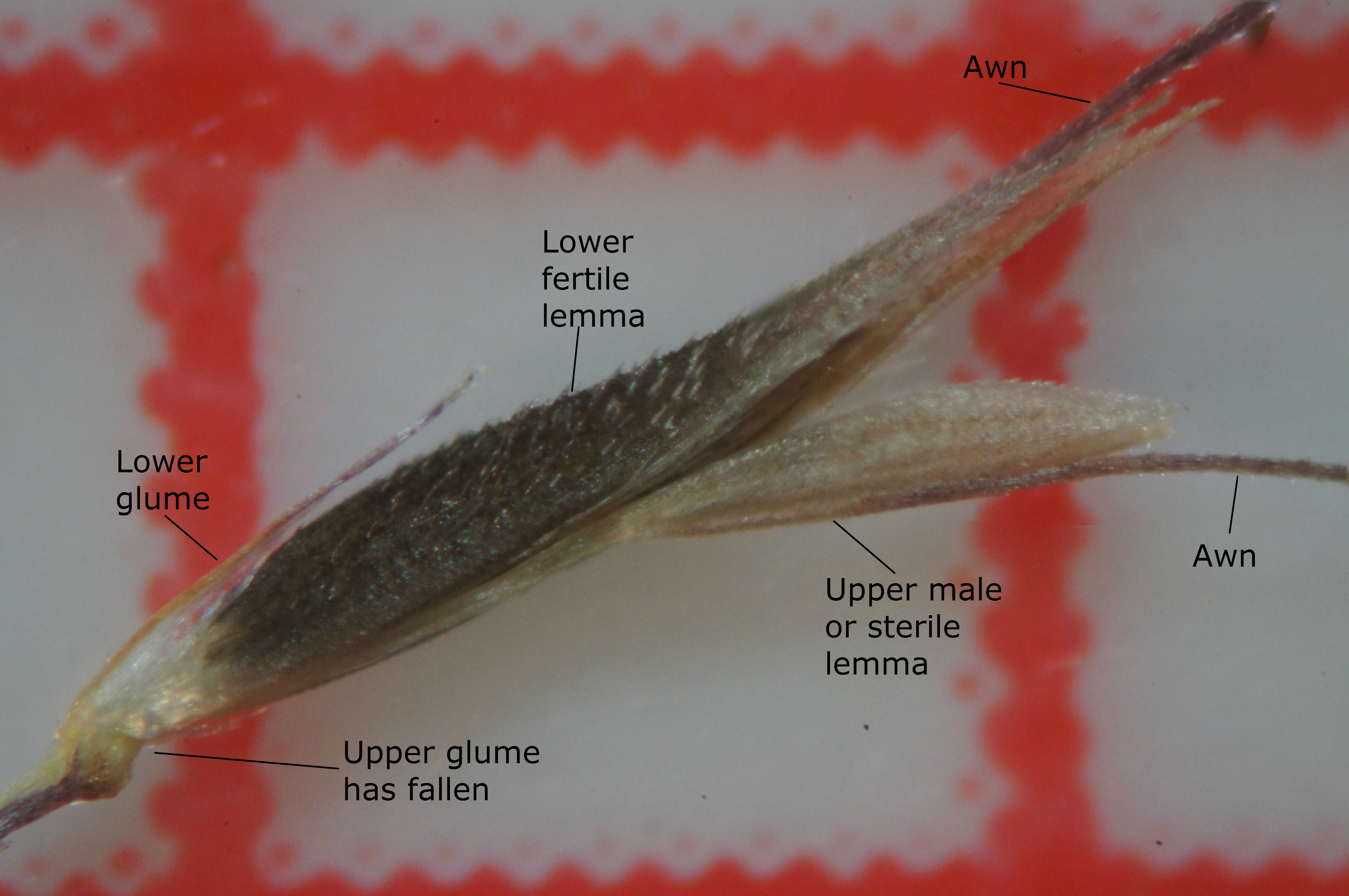
Mature spikelet

The species is most productive during the warmer months, responding rapidly to summer rainfall. Flowering has been recorded throughout the year in Taiwan, while Australian sources report flowering primarily between November and January. C. divaricata is also recognised as an effective coloniser of disturbed environments, including roadsides, cleared land and recently burnt areas.

== Taxonomy ==
C. divaricata belongs to the grass family Poaceae and the genus Chloris, a group of 53 accepted species commonly known as windmill grasses due to their distinctive digitate inflorescences. The species shares morphological characteristics with other members of the genus, particularly C. ventricosa and C. truncata, including a tufted growth habit and radiating flowering spikes.

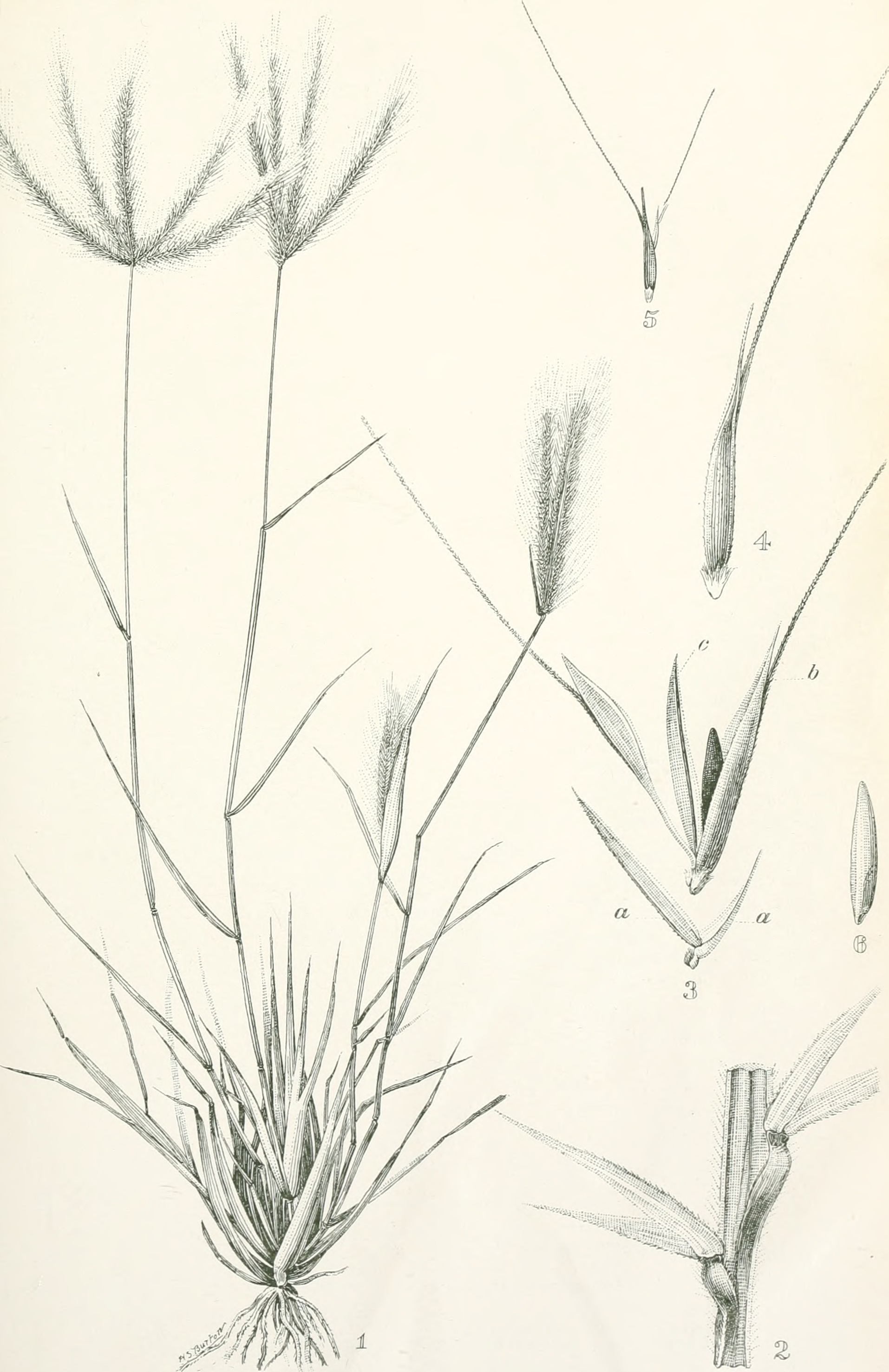

Originally described by Scottish botanist Robert Brown in 1810, the species was listed under the symbol "T.v.v." as the place of collection. Burbidge (1956) denotes that this location is to be taken as the west shores of Cape Shield near Groot Eylandt in the Gulf of Carpentaria and "Port 1. Keppel Bay..." as written on Brown's specimen labelled "3. Chloris divaricata."

There has been debate on the decision of a variation of the species being, C. divaricata var. cynodontoides. C. divaricata from Australia, and C. cynodontoides from Fiji, Tonga, and New Caledonia were treated as individual species until more recently. Australian grass taxonomist Michael Lazarides' (1972) reclassified C. divaricata var. cynodontoides describing the distinctions between varieties, specifically in stem flaccidity or rigidness (respectively) and spikelet density. This name is now undertaken as a synonym for C. divaricata under the Kew classification.

The taxonomic status of C. divaricata var. cynodontoides has been the subject of debate. Originally, C. divaricata from Australia and C. cynodontoides from Fiji, Tonga and New Caledonia were recognised as separate species. Lazarides (1972) later reclassified C. cynodontoides as a variety of C. divaricata, distinguishing the taxa primarily by differences in stem rigidity and spikelet density. However, Anderson (1974) questioned the need to recognise separate varieties, and current treatments such as Plants of the World Online regard C. divaricata var. cynodontoides as a synonym of C. divaricata.

== Distribution and habitats ==
C. divaricata is native to Australia. It has also become naturalised in Okinawa, North America, and in low to middle elevations in central and eastern Taiwan and has been introduced into the Cook Islands, Czechia-Slovakia, Fiji, Germany, Hawaii, Marquesas, New Caledonia, New Mexico, South Carolina, Taiwan, Texas, Tonga, and Vanuatu.

Within Australia, C. divaricata occurs throughout inland regions of southern Queensland, the Northern Territory and New South Wales, where it is relatively common. The species occupies a broad range of habitats and soil types; Everist described it as occurring on "practically all soils, from heavy black soils to light sandy loams".

It is commonly associated with open woodland and grassland communities and has been recorded across a variety of land systems, including the Mulga Lands, brigalow communities, poplar box woodlands and Bendee ridge systems.

== Ecology ==
The species favours alluvial areas prone to periodic flooding, and considered a good coloniser on newly cleared or freshly burnt areas, making it a preferred grass species often found in disturbed areas. C. divaricata is regarded as a valuable and palatable forage species, providing feed for livestock in both its green, actively growing state and after drying. The species is readily grazed by cattle and other herbivores, maintaining its nutritional value reasonably well as it matures.

The species is often found in healthy open forest and woodland habitats and may serve as an indicator of good ecosystem health, providing food for seed-eating birds and shelter for small mammals, reptiles and insects.

In Taiwan, C. divaricata is often found on abandoned land, in gardens, nurseries, or roadsides, in lowlands to middle elevations with the naturalised grass species Sporobulus tenuissimus.

== Uses ==
Like other members of the genus, particularly C. ventricosa and C. truncata, C. divaricata can contribute to soil stabilisation on agricultural land due to its stoloniferous growth habit. The species withstands regular defoliation and may increase productivity under grazing pressure, making it a potentially valuable component of pasture and rangeland systems. The species produces most rapidly following summer rains, and in collaboration with rotational grazing can promote growth, resilience, and spread
