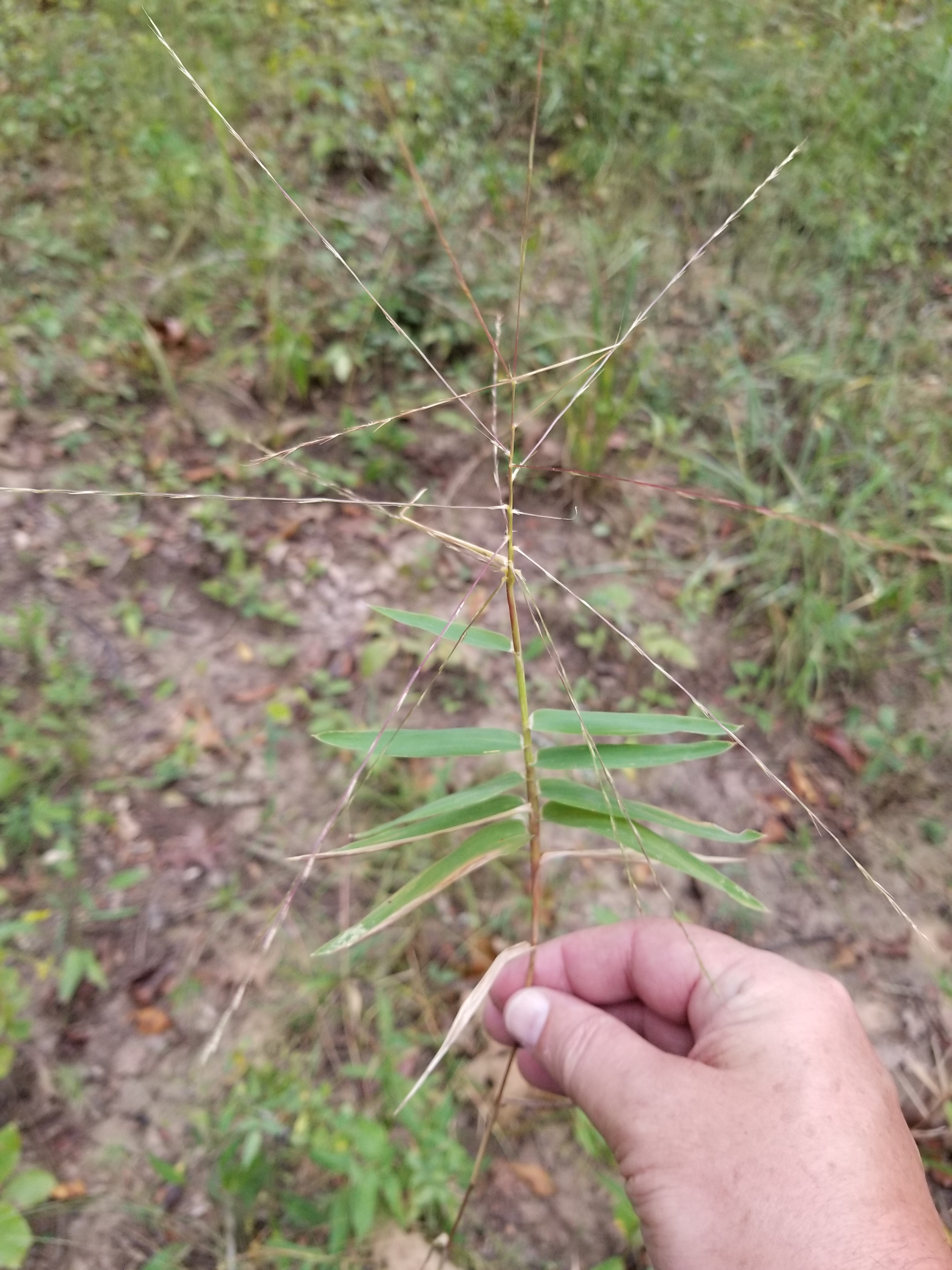
- Common name: Bearded skeletongrass Photographed at the Camp Robinson Special Use Area Wildlife Management Area, Faulkner County, Arkansas

Scientific classification
- Kingdom: Plantae
- Clade: Tracheophytes
- Clade: Angiosperms
- Clade: Monocots
- Clade: Commelinids
- Order: Poales
- Family: Poaceae
- Subfamily: Chloridoideae
- Tribe: Cynodonteae
- Subtribe: Hubbardochloinae
- Genus: Gymnopogon; P. Beauv. 1812

Type species
- Andropogon ambiguus Michx.

Synonyms
- Alloiatheros Raf.; Anthopogon Nutt.; Biatherium Desv.; Doellochloa Kuntze; Monochaete Döll

= Gymnopogon =

Genus of grasses

Gymnopogon (skeletongrass) is a genus of American and Southeast Asian plants in the grass family.

Species

- Gymnopogon ambiguus (Michx.) Britton, Stern & Poggenb. - southeastern + south-central United States (NM to NJ); Hispaniola
- Gymnopogon aristiglumis Hitchc. - El Salvador
- Gymnopogon brevifolius Trin. - southeastern + south-central USA (TX to NJ)
- Gymnopogon burchellii (Munro ex Döll) Ekman - Bolivia, Brazil, Argentina, Paraguay, Uruguay
- Gymnopogon chapmanianus Hitchc. - Georgia, Florida
- Gymnopogon delicatulus (C.B.Clarke) Bor - Laos, Myanmar, Thailand, Vietnam
- Gymnopogon doellii Boechat & Valls - Brazil
- Gymnopogon fastigiatus Nees - Costa Rica, Panama, Colombia, Venezuela, Brazil, Bolivia
- Gymnopogon foliosus (Willd.) Nees - Hispaniola, Puerto Rico, Leeward Islands, Colombia, Venezuela, Guianas, Peru, Brazil
- Gymnopogon glaber Caro - Argentina
- Gymnopogon grandiflorus Roseng., B.R.Arrill. & Izag. - Brazil, Argentina, Uruguay, Peru
- Gymnopogon legrandii Roseng., B.R.Arrill. & Izag. - Brazil, Argentina, Uruguay
- Gymnopogon spicatus (Spreng.) Kuntze - from Veracruz to Uruguay including Trinidad
- Gymnopogon toldensis Sulekic & Rúgolo - Argentina

formerly included

now regarded as better suited to other genera: Chloris Dichaetaria Enteropogon
