= Chloris cubensis =

Scientific classification
- Kingdom: Plantae
- Clade: Tracheophytes
- Clade: Angiosperms
- Clade: Monocots
- Clade: Commelinids
- Order: Poales
- Family: Poaceae
- Subfamily: Chloridoideae
- Genus: Chloris
- Species: C. cubensis

Binomial name
- Chloris cubensis Hitchc. & Ekman

Synonyms
- Chloris sagraeana subsp. cubensis (Hitchc. & Ekman) Cat.

Species of plant

Chloris cubensis is a species of grass native to the islands of the Caribbean. It has been collected in Cuba, Puerto Rico, the Virgin Islands, Jamaica, Antigua, Barbados, and Guadeloupe. Common name in English is Cuban windmill grass.
