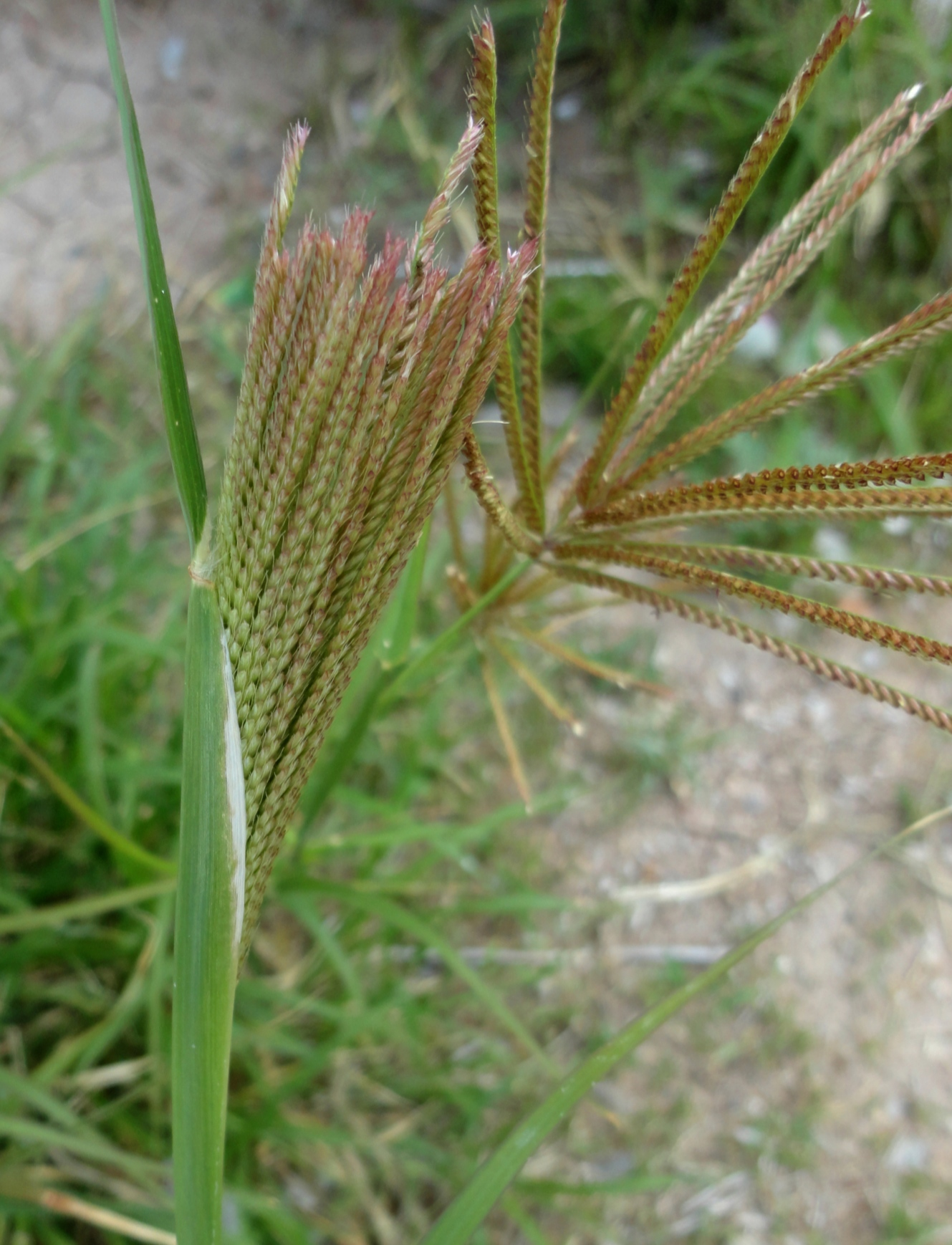
- Seeds

Conservation status
- Secure (NatureServe)

Scientific classification
- Kingdom: Plantae
- Clade: Tracheophytes
- Clade: Angiosperms
- Clade: Monocots
- Clade: Commelinids
- Order: Poales
- Family: Poaceae
- Subfamily: Chloridoideae
- Genus: Chloris
- Species: C. cucullata

Binomial name
- Chloris cucullata Bisch.

= Chloris cucullata =

Species of grass

Chloris cucullata is a species of grass known by the common name hooded windmill grass. It is native to the United States, particularly the states of Texas and New Mexico, and adjacent Mexico.

This is a clump-forming perennial grass with erect stems up to 60 centimetres (24 in) tall. The leaf blades are up to 20 centimetres (7.9 in) long, the longer ones located around the base. The panicle contains whorls of spikelets, each whorl with several branches up to 5 centimetres (2.0 in) long. The branches are purplish, drying brown.
