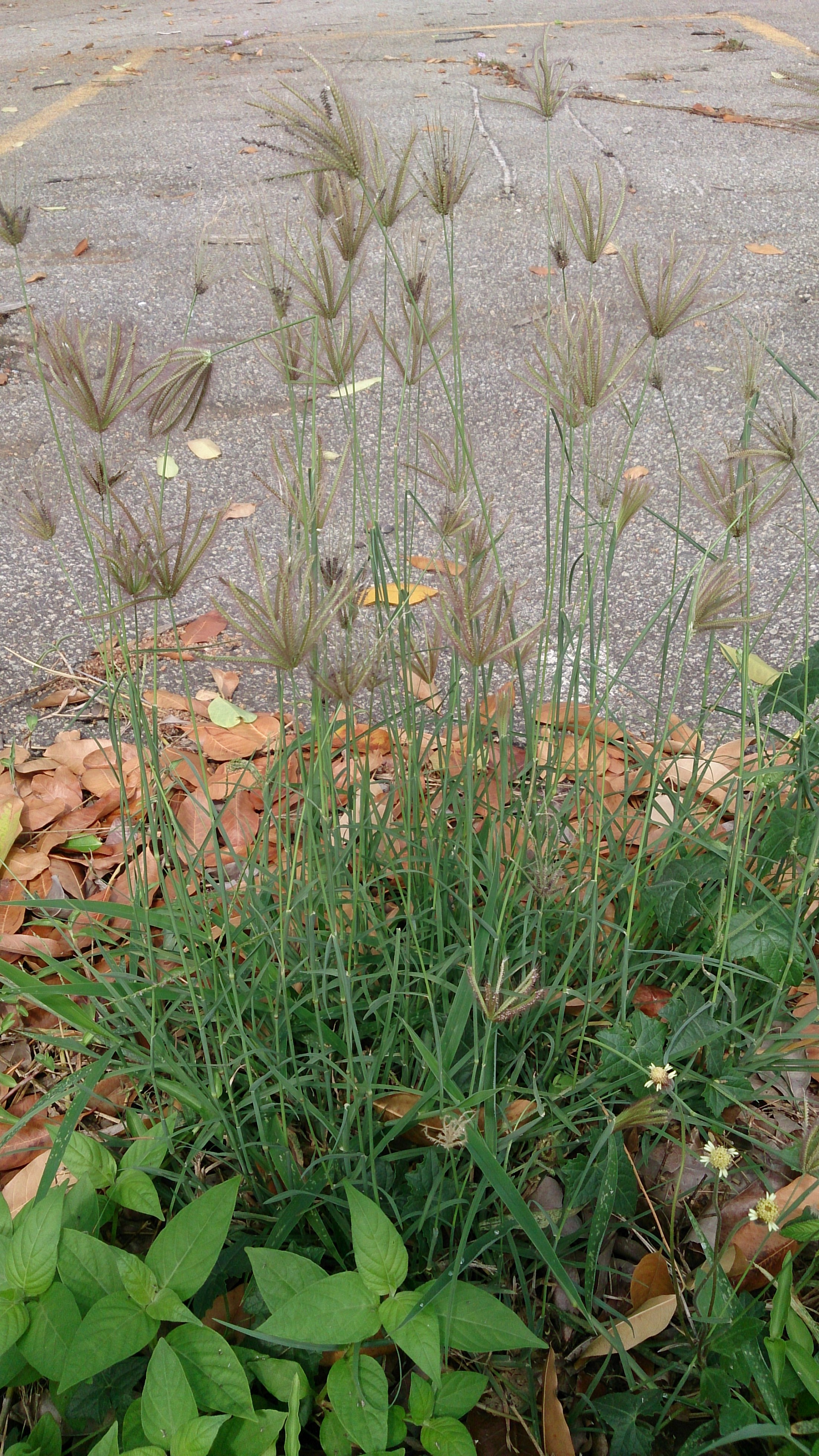
- Habit
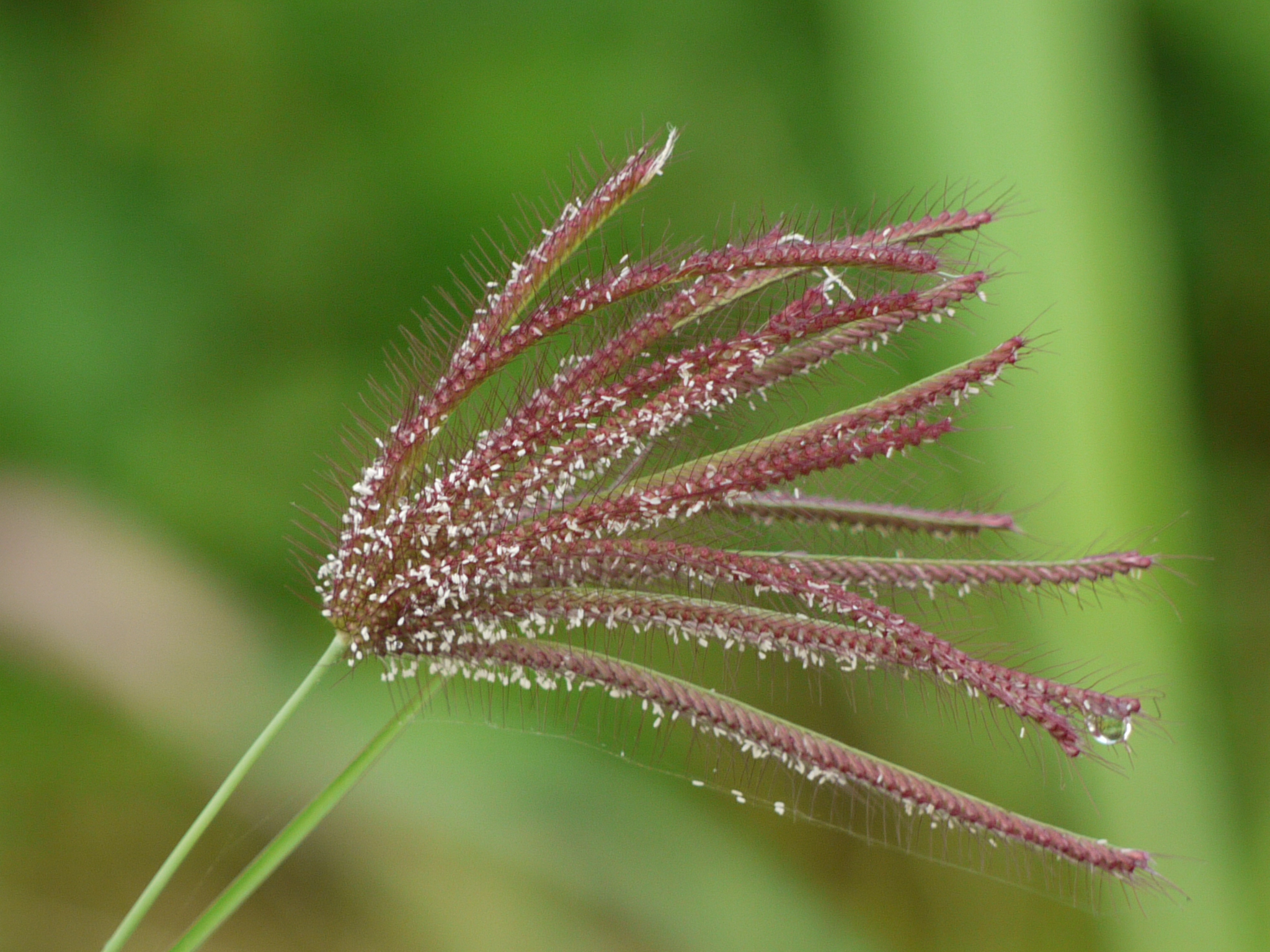
- Inflorescence

Scientific classification
- Kingdom: Plantae
- Clade: Tracheophytes
- Clade: Angiosperms
- Clade: Monocots
- Clade: Commelinids
- Order: Poales
- Family: Poaceae
- Subfamily: Chloridoideae
- Genus: Chloris
- Species: C. barbata

Binomial name
- Chloris barbata Sw.

Synonyms
- Andropogon barbatus L.; Chloris inflata Link; Chloris longifolia Steud.; Chloris paraguaiensis Steud.; Chloris rufescens Steud.

= Chloris barbata =

Species of plant

Chloris barbata (syn. Chloris inflata), the swollen fingergrass or purpletop chloris, is a widespread species of flowering plant in the grass family Poaceae. It is native to drier parts of the Old World tropics and sub-tropics, and it has been introduced to the southern US, most of Latin America and the Caribbean, many tropical islands, and Australia. It is considered an invasive weed species and is host to a number of serious agricultural pest species.
