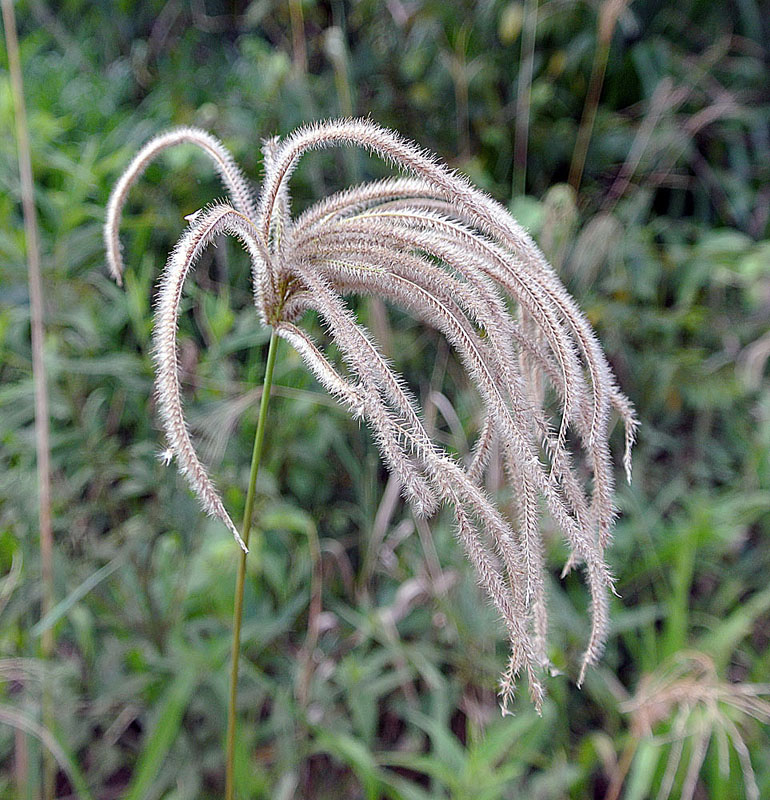
- Stapfochloa canterae

Scientific classification
- Kingdom: Plantae
- Clade: Tracheophytes
- Clade: Angiosperms
- Clade: Monocots
- Clade: Commelinids
- Order: Poales
- Family: Poaceae
- Clade: PACMAD clade
- Subfamily: Chloridoideae
- Genus: Stapfochloa; H.Scholz

= Stapfochloa =

Genus of grasses

Stapfochloa is a genus of grasses. It is also in the subfamily Chloridoideae, and the Cynodonteae tribe.

Its native range is from Texas (USA) and Mexico, to tropical and subtropical South America (within the countries of Argentina, the Bahamas, Belize, Bolivia, Brazil, Colombia, Cuba, Dominican Republic, Guyana, Haiti, Jamaica, the Leeward Islands, Netherlands Antilles, Nicaragua, Paraguay, Puerto Rico, Uruguay, Venezuela and the Windward Islands) and also tropical Africa (within Burkina, Cameroon, Chad, Ethiopia, Kenya, Mali, Mauritania, Nigeria, Sudan, Tanzania and Uganda).

The genus name of Stapfochloa is in honour of Otto Stapf (1857–1933), an Austrian born botanist and taxonomist. It was first described and published in Willdenowia Vol.34 on page 131 in 2004.

== Accepted species ==
According to Kew;

- Stapfochloa berroi (Arechav.) P.M.Peterson
- Stapfochloa canterae (Arechav.) P.M.Peterson
- Stapfochloa ciliata (Sw.) P.M.Peterson
- Stapfochloa elata (Desv.) P.M.Peterson
- Stapfochloa grandiflora (Roseng. & Izag.) Wipff & Shaw
- Stapfochloa lamproparia (Stapf) H.Scholz
- Stapfochloa parodiana (Roseng. & Izag.) Wipff & Shaw
- Stapfochloa parvispicula (Caro & E.A.Sánchez) P.M.Peterson

The genus is recognized by the United States Department of Agriculture and the Agricultural Research Service, they only list the following species; Stapfochloa berroi, Stapfochloa canterae, Stapfochloa ciliata, Stapfochloa elata and Stapfochloa lamproparia.
