= Gymnopogon brevifolius =

Scientific classification
- Kingdom: Plantae
- Clade: Tracheophytes
- Clade: Angiosperms
- Clade: Monocots
- Clade: Commelinids
- Order: Poales
- Family: Poaceae
- Subfamily: Chloridoideae
- Genus: Gymnopogon
- Species: G. brevifolius

Binomial name
- Gymnopogon brevifolius Trin.

Species of grass

Gymnopogon brevifolius, commonly known as pineland skeleton grass, is a species of grass in the family Poaceae that is native to the southeastern United States.

== Description ==
Gymnopogon brevifolius is a tufted, rhizomatous perennial grass with glabrous, branching culms reaching 30–60 cm tall. Leaves are cauline, with blades up to 9 cm long, glabrous on both surfaces, and margins that are slightly rough. The leaf bases are cordate, and the sheaths are glabrous but often hairy near the apex. Ligules are membranous, ciliolate, and less than 0.4 mm long; collars are usually pilose. Inflorescences are racemose spikes with spreading, flexuous, angled branches that are also scaberulous. Spikelets are one-flowered, appressed in two rows along one side of the rachis, and measure 4.5–6.5 cm in length. Pedicels are angled, rough, and up to 1.5 mm long or absent. Glumes are 3.5–6.5 mm long, 1-nerved, with scarious margins. Fertile lemmas are usually glabrous, 3.5–4 mm long, and typically awned (5–10 mm); sterile lemmas may also be present. Paleas are 3.5–4 mm long and 2-nerved. The callus is usually bearded, and the rachilla may be prolonged or end in a sterile floret. Grains are reddish, linear-ellipsoid, and about 2.5–2.6 mm long.

== Distribution and habitat ==
Gymnopogon brevifolius is found from southern New Jersey south to South Florida and west to Louisiana, Arkansas, and East Texas. It grows in pine savannas, woodlands, prairies, sandhills, and calcaerous glades, typically in dry sandy or clay hardpan soils.

== Ecology ==
Gymnopogon brevifolius is considered to be poor forage value for livestock, but is eaten by white-tailed deer and is considered one of the main grasses that are eaten by deer. It is sensitive to soil disturbance by agriculture, and is a possible indicator of native ground-cover in the upper panhandle savannas in Florida.

It flowers between July and December.
