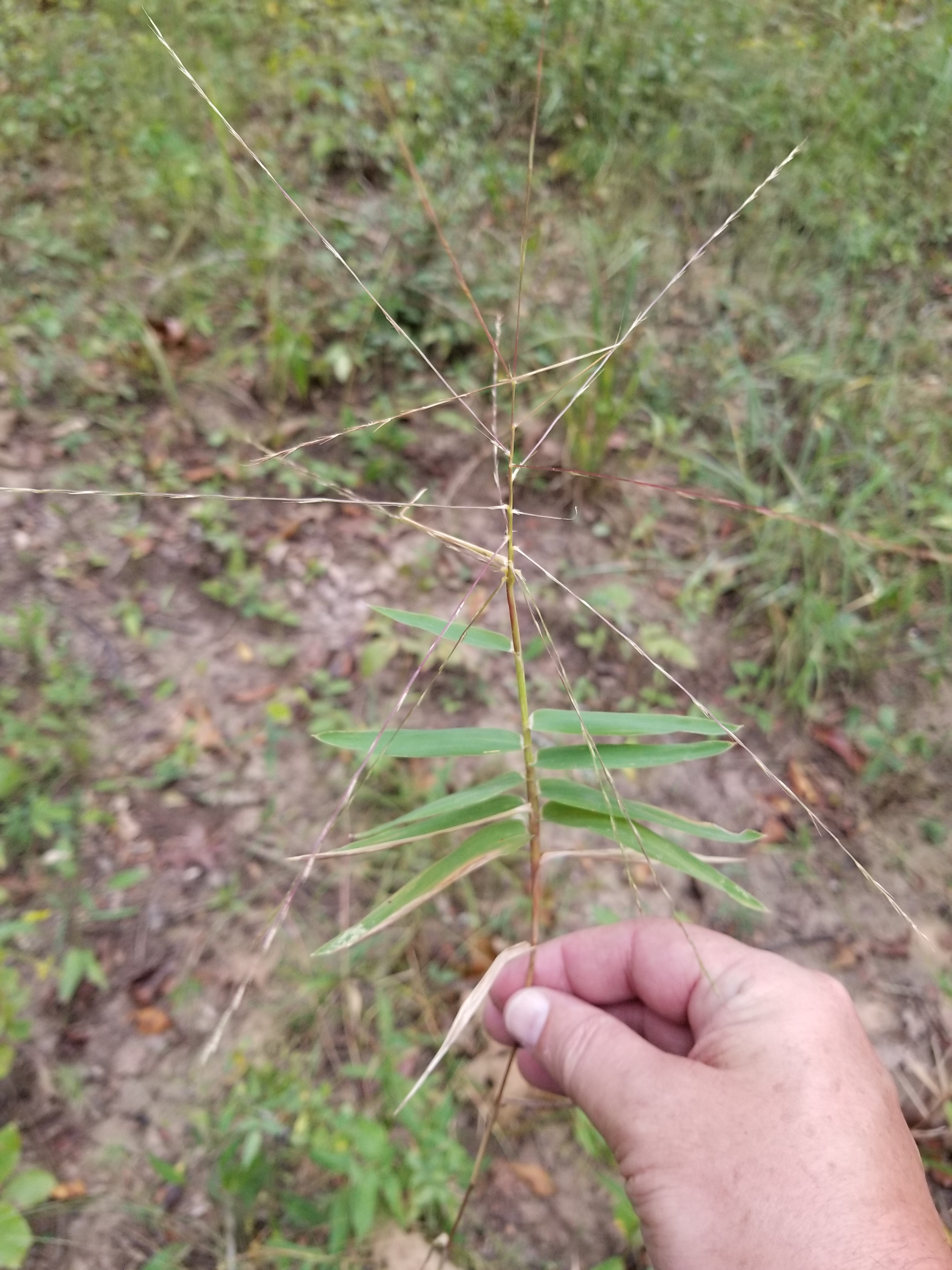

Scientific classification
- Kingdom: Plantae
- Clade: Tracheophytes
- Clade: Angiosperms
- Clade: Monocots
- Clade: Commelinids
- Order: Poales
- Family: Poaceae
- Subfamily: Chloridoideae
- Genus: Gymnopogon
- Species: G. ambiguus

Binomial name
- Gymnopogon ambiguus (Michx.) Britton, Sterns & Poggenb.

= Gymnopogon ambiguus =

Species of grass

Gymnopogon ambiguus, commonly called bearded skeletongrass, is a species of grass that is native to southeastern North America.

== Description ==
G. ambiguus is a perennial. It may reach between 3 and 7 decimeters (approximately 11.8 to 27.5 inches) in height. Its leaves may reach a length of 6 centimeters and their width ranges between 2 and 8 millimeters.

== Distribution and habitat ==
This species' range extends from Pennsylvania to Illinois and south to Texas through Florida.

G. ambiguus can be found in habitats such as prairies, woodlands, barrens, and dry fields.
