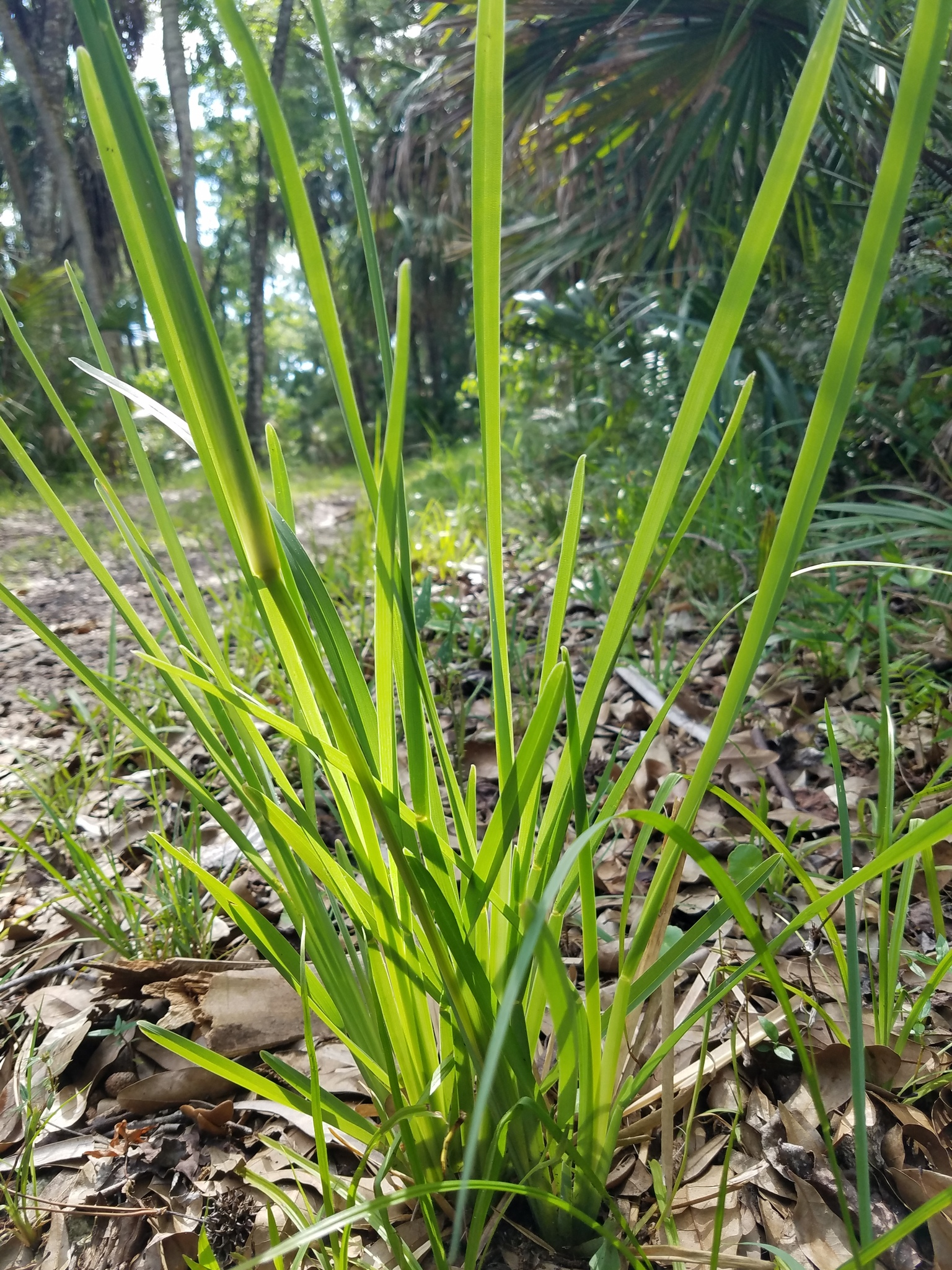

Conservation status
- Apparently Secure (NatureServe)

Scientific classification
- Kingdom: Plantae
- Clade: Embryophytes
- Clade: Tracheophytes
- Clade: Angiosperms
- Clade: Monocots
- Clade: Commelinids
- Order: Poales
- Family: Poaceae
- Subfamily: Chloridoideae
- Genus: Eustachys
- Species: E. glauca

Binomial name
- Eustachys glauca Chapm.

= Eustachys glauca =

Species of flowering plant

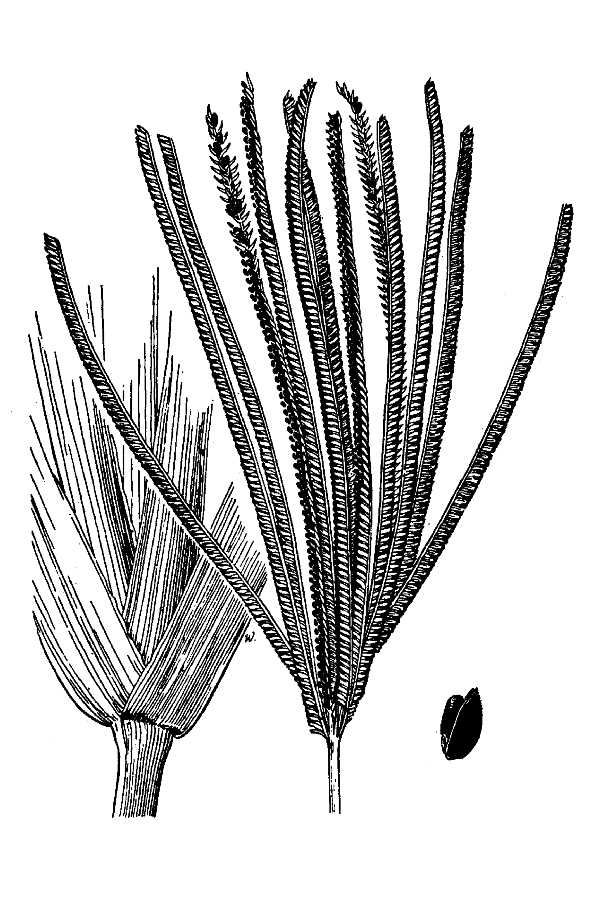
Botanical illustration of Eustachys glauca

Eustachys glauca, the saltmarsh fingergrass, is a species of grass native to the southeastern United States.

This perennial grass grows up to 4 feet tall. The dark green, folded leaf blades are 12 to 14 inches long and have rounded tips. The ligule is a tiny fringe of hairs. The seedhead is made up of 15 to 20 long spikes, each up to 5 centimeters long. The brown spikelets are arranged along one side of each spike. The grass grows for a long time during the year and may produce 2 or more crops of seed in a season.

This grass grows in coastal habitat, such as marsh land and sloughs. It prefers calcareous soils.

This grass provides a good graze for livestock, but overgrazing will kill it.
