= Chloris flagellifera =

Scientific classification
- Kingdom: Plantae
- Clade: Tracheophytes
- Clade: Angiosperms
- Clade: Monocots
- Clade: Commelinids
- Order: Poales
- Family: Poaceae
- Subfamily: Chloridoideae
- Genus: Chloris
- Species: C. flagellifera

Binomial name
- Chloris flagellifera (Nees) P.M.Peterson

Synonyms
- Cynosurus ternatus Forssk.; Eleusine arabica Hochst. ex Steud., pro syn.; Eleusine caespitosa A.Rich.; Eleusine compressa (Forssk.) Asch. & Schweinf. ex C.Chr.; Eleusine flagellifera Nees; Eleusine stolonifera R.Br., nom. nud.; Ochthochloa compressa (Forssk.) Hilu; Ochthochloa dactyloides Edgew.; Panicum compressum Forssk.

Genus of grasses

Chloris flagellifera is a species of flowering plant in the grass family Poaceae, native from Morocco in North Africa through the Arabian Peninsula to northwestern India.

== Taxonomy ==
The species was first described by Christian Nees in 1842 as Eleusine flagellifera. It was transferred to the genus Chloris in 2015. It has a number of other synonyms in the genus Eleusine, including Eleusine caespitosa and Eleusine compressa. It has also been placed in the genus Ochthochloa, which is now considered a synonym of Chloris.
