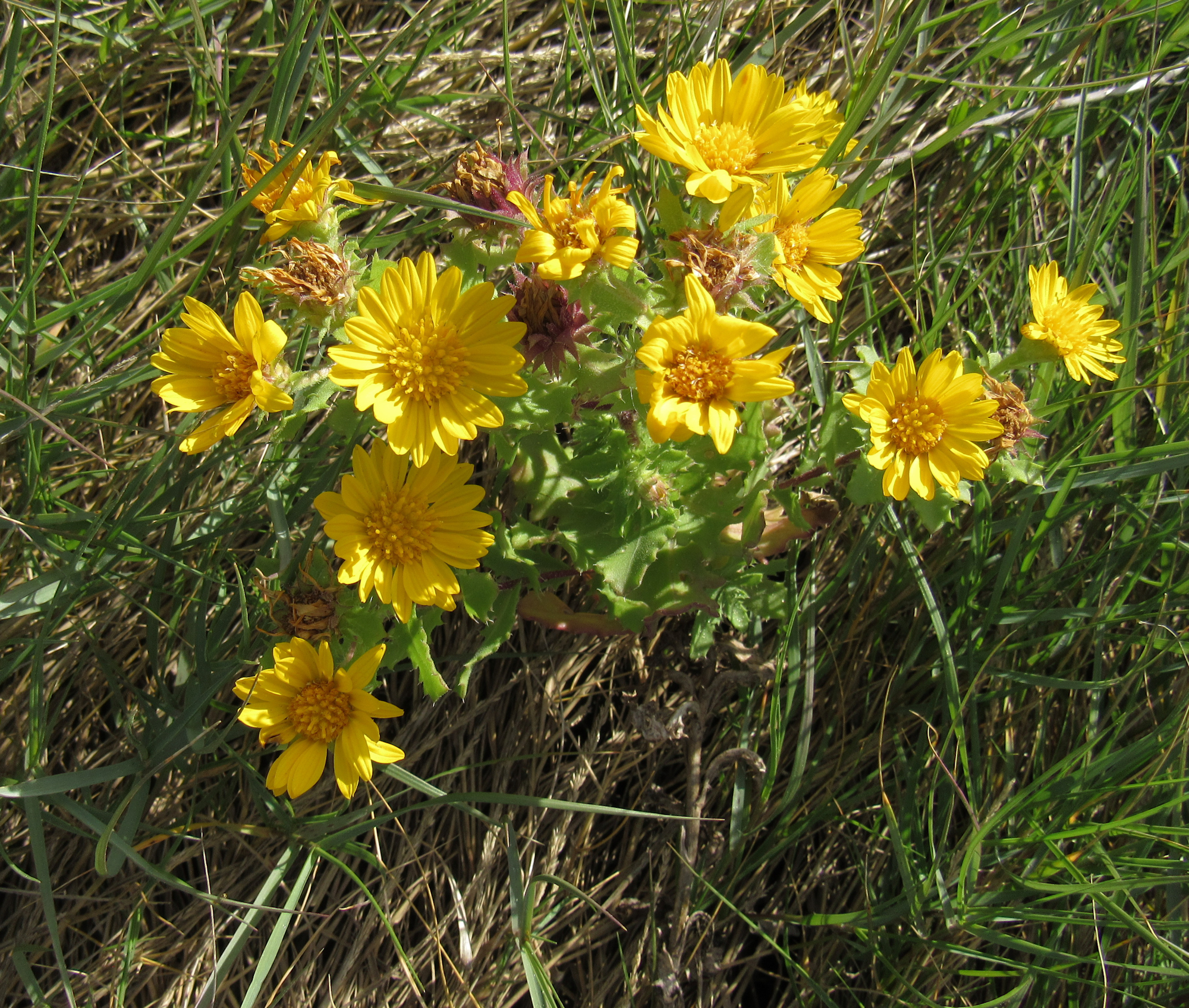
- Rayjacksonia phyllocephala

Scientific classification
- Kingdom: Plantae
- Clade: Embryophytes
- Clade: Tracheophytes
- Clade: Spermatophytes
- Clade: Angiosperms
- Clade: Eudicots
- Clade: Asterids
- Order: Asterales
- Family: Asteraceae
- Subfamily: Asteroideae
- Tribe: Astereae
- Subtribe: Machaerantherinae
- Genus: Rayjacksonia; R.L.Hartm. & M.A.Lane

= Rayjacksonia =

Genus of plants

Rayjacksonia is a genus of North American flowering plants in the family Asteraceae. It is one of several genera with the common name tansyaster.

The genus is named in honor of American botanist Raymond Carl Jackson.

Species

- Rayjacksonia annua (Rydb.) R.L.Hartm. & M.A.Lane - Texas, Oklahoma New Mexico, Colorado, Kansas, Nebraska & Wyoming
- Rayjacksonia aurea (A.Gray) R.L.Hartm. & M.A.Lane - Texas
- Rayjacksonia phyllocephala (DC.) R.L.Hartm. & M.A.Lane Tamaulipas, Texas, Louisiana, Mississippi & Florida.
