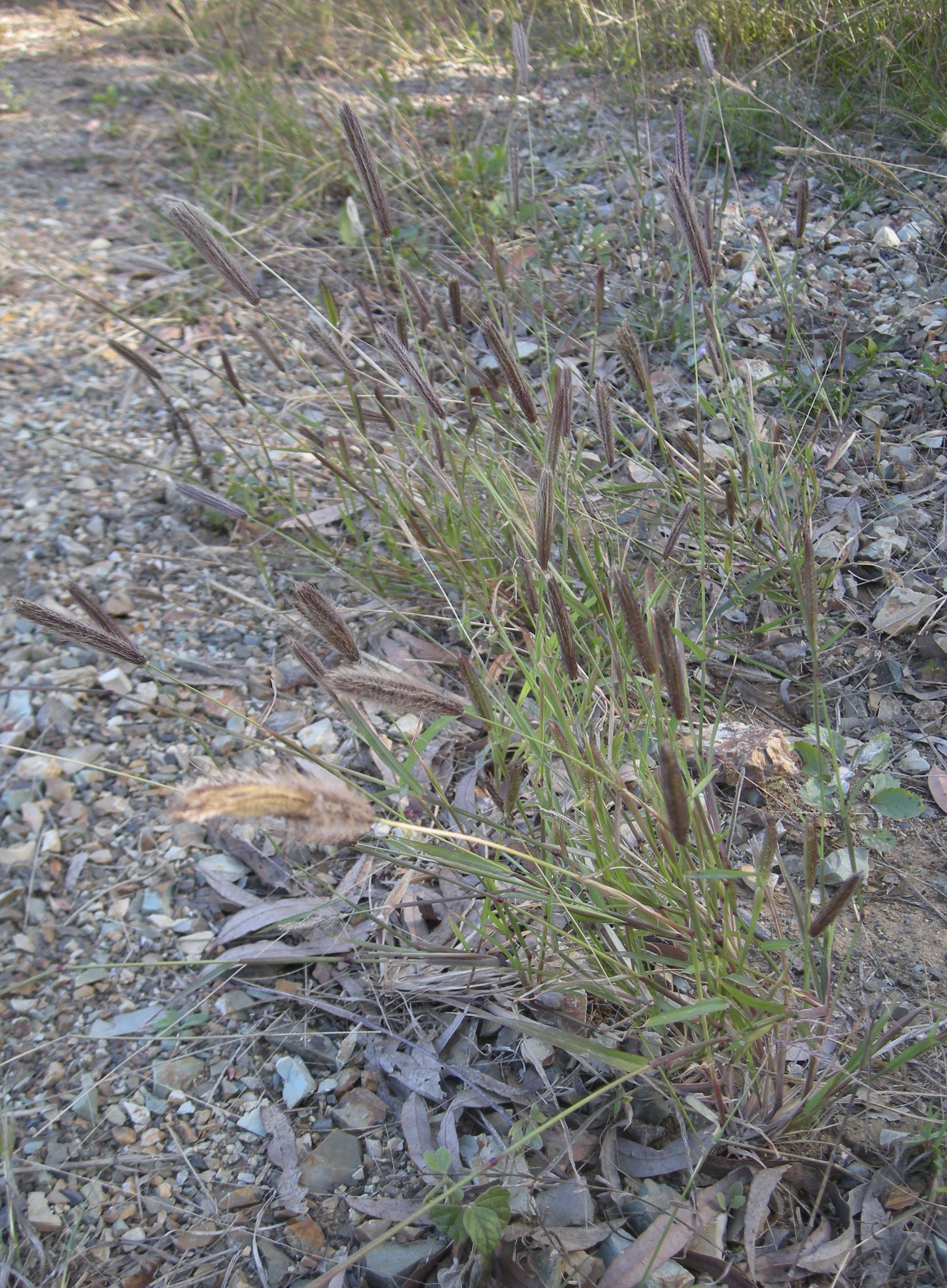

Scientific classification
- Kingdom: Plantae
- Clade: Tracheophytes
- Clade: Angiosperms
- Clade: Monocots
- Clade: Commelinids
- Order: Poales
- Family: Poaceae
- Subfamily: Chloridoideae
- Genus: Chloris
- Species: C. virgata

Binomial name
- Chloris virgata Sw.

Synonyms
- Chloris elegans Kunth; Chloris elegans (Kunth) Roberty

= Chloris virgata =

Species of grass

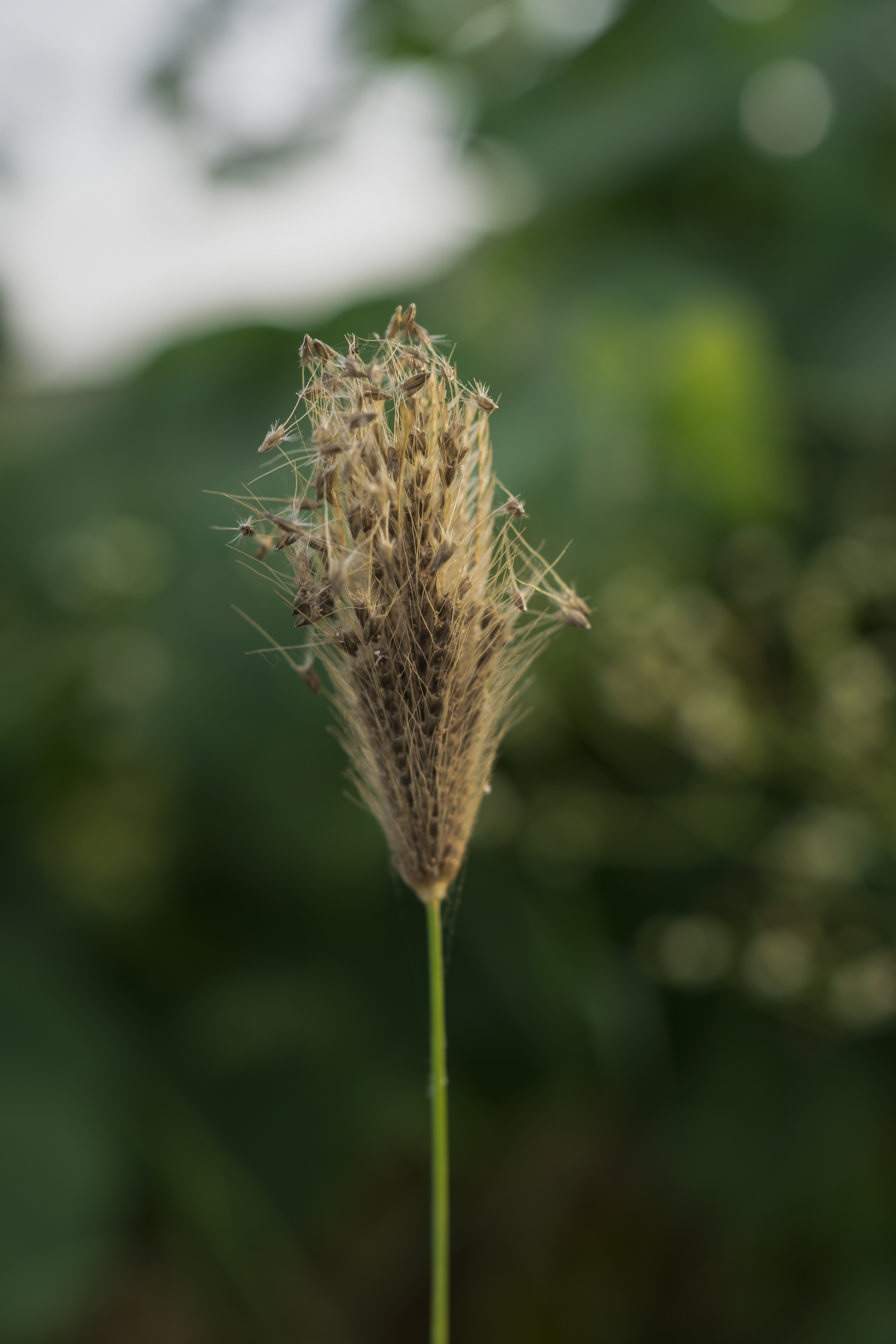
Chloris virgata Sw. inflorescence.

Chloris virgata is a species of grass known by the common names feather fingergrass feathery Rhodes-grass and feather windmill grass.

== Distribution ==
It is native to many of the warmer temperate, subtropical, and tropical regions of the world, including parts of Eurasia, Africa, and the Americas, and it is present in many other areas as a naturalized species, including Hawaii, Australia, and the Canary Islands.

Chloris virgata is a hardy grass which can grow in many types of habitat, including disturbed areas such as roadsides and railroad tracks, and cultivated farmland. It is known in some areas as a weed, for example, in alfalfa fields in the southwestern United States.

== Description ==
This is an annual grass growing up to about half a meter in maximum height. It sometimes forms tufts, and may or may not spread via stolons. The inflorescence is an array of 4 to 20 fingerlike branches up to 10 centimeters long. Each branch contains approximately 10 spikelets per centimeter. Each spikelet has one fertile floret and one or two sterile florets.
