= Raymond Carl Jackson =

American botanist (1928–2008)

Raymond Carl Jackson (May 7, 1928, Medora, Indiana – April 7, 2008, Lubbock, Texas) was an American botanist, known as Ray Jackson, noted "for his work in cytogenetics, particularly on polyploidy, and for his discovery of low chromosome numbers in angiosperms."

== Biography ==
After three years of service in the U.S. Army Air Forces/U.S. Air Force, Jackson matriculated in 1949 at Indiana University Bloomington, where he graduated with bachelor's degree in 1952 and master's degree in 1953. In 1953, he became a graduate student at Purdue University, where he graduated in 1955 with Ph.D. in botany. From 1955 to 1958, he was a faculty member and herbarium curator at the University of New Mexico. In New Mexico he studied the dessert annual Xanthisma gracile (synonym Haplopappus gracilis) and found that it has "n=2 chromosomes, the lowest number ever reported for a plant."

From 1958 to 1971, he was a professor of botany at the University of Kansas, where in 1969 he was appointed chair of the botany department. There he was also the chair of the interdepartmental Ph.D. program in genetics. In 1971, Jackson become the chair of the department of biological sciences at Texas Tech University. There he resigned as chair in 1978, was appointed Paul Whitfield Horn Professor in 1980, became professor emeritus in 1997, and continued his research as Horn Professor Emeritus until he died in 2008.

Jackson collected plants in the United States and Mexico. He began his Mexican collections in 1957 and continued through the 1970s. In the 1970s, he became a leading expert in cytogenetics and plant biosystematics.

In 1947, in Brownstown, Indiana, he married Thelma June Snyder (b. 1929); they had a son and a daughter.

== Eponyms ==
- (Asteraceae) Rayjacksonia (genus with at least 3 species)

== Selected publications ==
- Jackson, R. C. (1953). A Cytotaxonomic Study of Four Perennial Sunflowers: Helianthus mollis, H. doronicoides, H. tomentosus, and H. resinosus. Indiana University; 76 pp.
- Jackson, R. C. (1959). "A Study of Meiosis in Haplopappus gracilis (Compositae)". American Journal of Botany. 46 (7): 550–554. Bibcode:1959AmJB...46..550J. doi:10.1002/j.1537-2197.1959.tb07049.x.
- Jackson, R. C. (1959). "Two New Species of Helianthus from New Mexico". Madroño. 15 (2): 54–57. JSTOR 41422976.
- Li, Ning; Jackson, R. C. (1961). "Cytology of Supernumerary Chromosomes in Haplopappus spinulosus ssp. cotula". American Journal of Botany. 48 (5): 419–426. Bibcode:1961AmJB...48..419L. doi:10.1002/j.1537-2197.1961.tb11660.x.
- Jackson, R. C. (1962). "Interspecific Hybridization in Haplopappus and Its Bearing on Chromosome Evolution in the Blepharodon Section". American Journal of Botany. 49 (2): 119–132. Bibcode:1962AmJB...49..119J. doi:10.1002/j.1537-2197.1962.tb14917.x.
- Jackson, R. C. (1963). "Variation in the Short Arm of Chromosome B of Haplopappus gracilis". Canadian Journal of Genetics and Cytology. 5 (4): 421–426. doi:10.1139/g63-059. ISSN 0008-4093.
- Jackson, R. C. (1965). "A Cytogenetic Study of a Three-Paired Race of Haplopappus gracilis". American Journal of Botany. 52 (9): 946–953. Bibcode:1965AmJB...52..946J. doi:10.1002/j.1537-2197.1965.tb07270.x.
- Stucky, Jon; Jackson, R. C. (1975). "DNA Content of Seven Species of Astereae and Its Significance to Theories of Chromosome Evolution in the Tribe". American Journal of Botany. 62 (5): 509–518. Bibcode:1975AmJB...62..509S. doi:10.1002/j.1537-2197.1975.tb14077.x.
- Jackson, R. C.; Jordan, R. G. (1975). "Haploidy in Haplopappus gracilis (N = 2)". American Journal of Botany. 62 (6): 628–632. Bibcode:1975AmJB...62..628J. doi:10.1002/j.1537-2197.1975.tb14093.x.
- Arnold, M. L.; Jackson, R. C. (1978). "Biochemical, Cytogenetic and Morphological Relationships of a New Species of Machaeranthera sect. Arida (Compositae)". Systematic Botany. 3 (2): 208. Bibcode:1978SysBo...3..208A. doi:10.2307/2418314. JSTOR 2418314.
- Jackson, R. C. (1979). "Intersectional Hybridization in Haplopappus: Blepharodon x Hazardia". Systematic Botany. 4 (2): 157–162. Bibcode:1979SysBo...4..157J. doi:10.2307/2418853. JSTOR 2418853.
- Jackson, R. C.; Dimas, Calixto T. (1981). "Experimental Evidence for Systematic Placement of the Haplopappus phyllocephalus Complex (Compositae)". Systematic Botany. 6 (1): 8–14. Bibcode:1981SysBo...6....8J. doi:10.2307/2418630. JSTOR 2418630.
- Jackson, R. C.; Hauber, Donald P. (1982). "Autotriploid and Autotetraploid Cytogenetic Analyses: Correction Coefficients for Proposed Binomial Models". American Journal of Botany. 69 (4): 644–646. Bibcode:1982AmJB...69..644J. doi:10.1002/j.1537-2197.1982.tb13303.x.
- Jackson, R. C.; Casey, Jane (1982). "Cytogenetic Analyses of Autopolyploids: Models and Methods for Triploids to Octoploids". American Journal of Botany. 69 (4): 487–501. Bibcode:1982AmJB...69..487J. doi:10.1002/j.1537-2197.1982.tb13284.x.
- Jackson, R. C. (1982). "Polyploidy and Diploidy: New Perspectives on Chromosome Pairing and Its Evolutionary Implications". American Journal of Botany. 69 (9): 1512–1523. Bibcode:1982AmJB...69.1512J. doi:10.1002/j.1537-2197.1982.tb13400.x.
- Jackson, R. C.; Murray, B. G. (1983). "Colchicine induced quadrivalent formation in Helianthus: evidence of ancient polyploidy". Theoretical and Applied Genetics. 64 (3): 219–222. doi:10.1007/BF00303768. ISSN 0040-5752. PMID 24264948. S2CID 7374531. (See colchicine.)
- Jackson, R. C. (1985). "Genomic Differentiation and Its Effect on Gene Flow". Systematic Botany. 10 (4): 391–404. Bibcode:1985SysBo..10..391J. doi:10.2307/2419133. JSTOR 2419133.
- Jackson, R. C. (1985). "Mitotic Instability in Haplopappus: Structural and Genic Causes". American Journal of Botany. 72 (9): 1452–1457. Bibcode:1985AmJB...72.1452J. doi:10.1002/j.1537-2197.1985.tb08403.x. ISSN 0002-9122.
- Jackson, R. C. (1988). "A Quantitative Cytogenetic Analysis of an Intersectional Hybrid in Helianthus (Compositae)". American Journal of Botany. 75 (5): 609–614. Bibcode:1988AmJB...75..609J. doi:10.1002/j.1537-2197.1988.tb13484.x. PMID 30139082.
- Jackson, R. C.; Hauber, Donald P. (1994). "Quantitative cytogenetic analyses of autoploid and alloploid taxa in the Helianthus ciliarisgroup (Compositae)". American Journal of Botany. 81 (8): 1063–1069. Bibcode:1994AmJB...81.1063J. doi:10.1002/j.1537-2197.1994.tb15595.x.
- Jackson, R. C.; Jackson, Jeff W. (1996). "Gene segregation in autotetraploids: Prediction from meiotic configurations". American Journal of Botany. 83 (6): 673–678. Bibcode:1996AmJB...83..673J. doi:10.1002/j.1537-2197.1996.tb12756.x.
- Jackson, R. C.; Skvarla, J. J.; Chissoe, W. F. (2000). "A unique pollen wall mutation in the family Compositae: Ultrastructure and genetics". American Journal of Botany. 87 (11): 1571–1577. doi:10.2307/2656732. JSTOR 2656732. PMID 11080106.
- Jackson, R. C.; Ngo, N.; Ngo, H. (2002). "Chromosome-specific desynapsis in the n = 2 race of Haplopappus gracilis (Compositae)". American Journal of Botany. 89 (5): 777–782. doi:10.3732/ajb.89.5.777. PMID 21665677.
