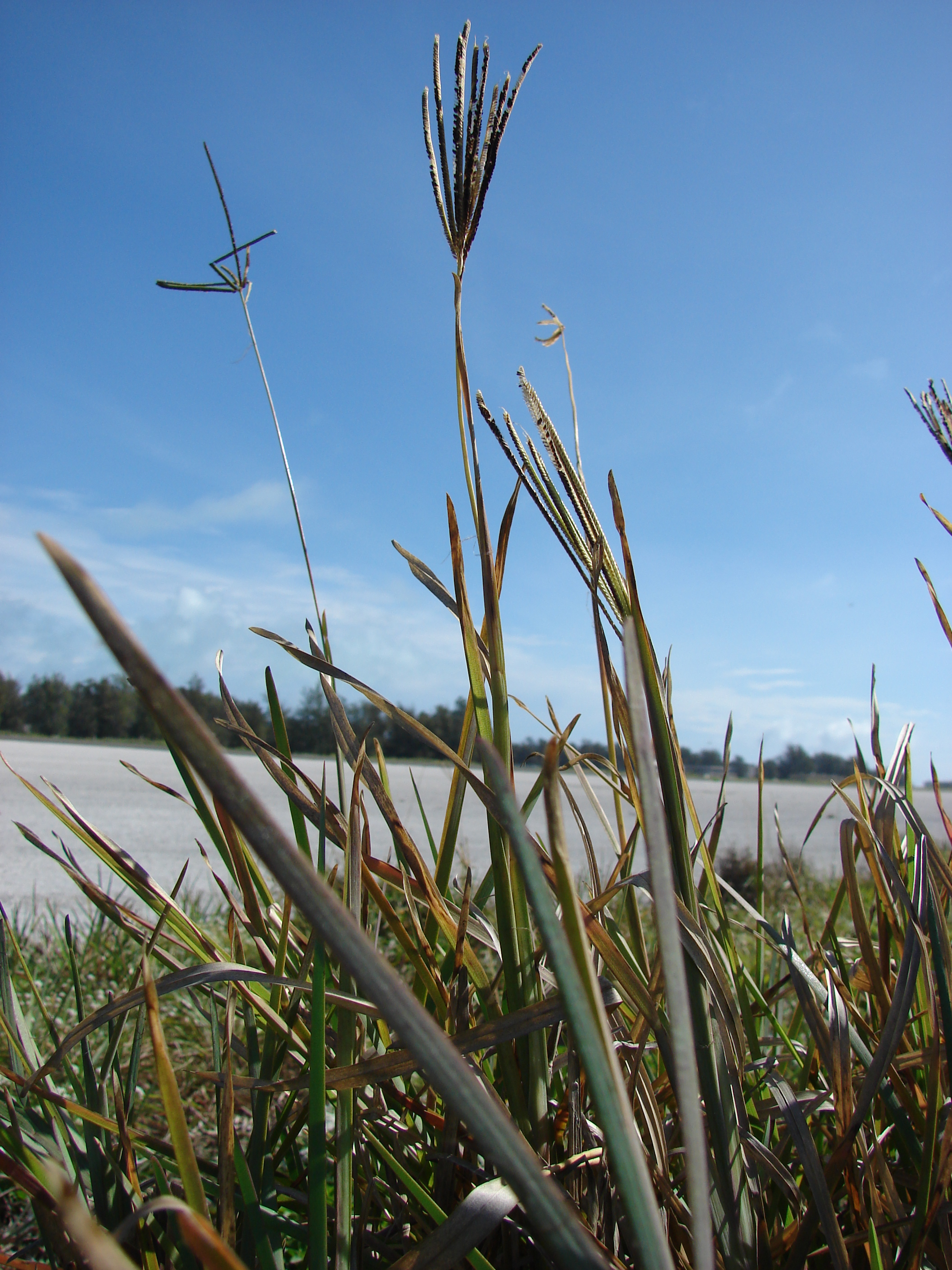
- Eustachys petraea Midway Atoll, Pacific Ocean

Scientific classification
- Kingdom: Plantae
- Clade: Tracheophytes
- Clade: Angiosperms
- Clade: Monocots
- Clade: Commelinids
- Order: Poales
- Family: Poaceae
- Subfamily: Chloridoideae
- Tribe: Cynodonteae
- Subtribe: Eleusininae
- Genus: Eustachys; Desv. 1810 not Salisb. 1866 (syn of Ornithogalum)

Type species
- Eustachys petraea (Sw.) Desv.

Synonyms
- Chloroides Fisch. ex Regel; Schultesia Spreng.

= Eustachys =

Genus of flowering plants

Eustachys (fan grass or fingergrass) is a genus of tropical and subtropical plants in the grass family. It is native primarily to warmer parts of the Americas, with a few species in Africa and Asia.

== Species ==
Species include:

- Eustachys bahiensis (Steud.) Herter - Brazil (Bahia, Paraná, Pernambuco), Bolivia (Chuquisaca, Santa Cruz), Uruguay, Argentina
- Eustachys brevipila (Roseng. & Izag.) Caro & E.A.Sánchez - Uruguay, Argentina (Corrientes, Entre Rios), Brazil (Mato Grosso do Sul, Rio Grande do Sul)
- Eustachys calvescens (Hack.) Caro & E.A.Sánchez - Uruguay, Argentina (Misiones), Paraguay, Brazil (Mato Grosso, Paraná, Santa Catarina)
- Eustachys caribaea (Spreng.) Herter - Uruguay, Argentina, Paraguay, Brazil, Bolivia; naturalized in United States (TX LA MS GA)
- Eustachys distichophylla Nees - Uruguay, Argentina, Chile, Paraguay, Brazil, Bolivia, Peru; naturalized in United States (CA AL GA FL)
- Eustachys floridana Chapm. - United States (AL GA FL)
- Eustachys glauca Chapm. - United States (MS AL GA FL SC NC)
- Eustachys neglecta (Nash) Nash - United States (AL TX FL)
- Eustachys paranensis A.M.Molina - Brazil (Paraná)
- Eustachys paspaloides (Vahl) Lanza & Mattei - Oman, Yemen, eastern + southern Africa from Eritrea to Cape Province
- Eustachys petraea (Sw.) Desv. - United States (TX LA MS AL GA FL SC NC PA NY), Mexico, West Indies (Bahamas, Greater + Lesser Antilles), Central + South America; naturalized on various Pacific Islands (Hawaii, Midway, Carolines, Marianas, Kiribati)
- Eustachys retusa (Lag.) Kunth - Uruguay, Argentina, Paraguay, Brazil, Bolivia; naturalized in United States (TX FL GA SC NY)
- Eustachys swalleniana A.M.Molina - Brazil (Paraná, Rio Grande do Sul), Uruguay (Cerro Largo)
- Eustachys tenera (J.S.Presl) A.Camus - New Guinea, southeast Asia, southern China incl Taiwan
- Eustachys uliginosa (Hack.) Herter - Uruguay, Argentina (Corrientes, Entre Rios, Misiones), Paraguay, Brazil (Paraná, Santa Catarina, Rio Grande do Sul), Bolivia (Santa Cruz)

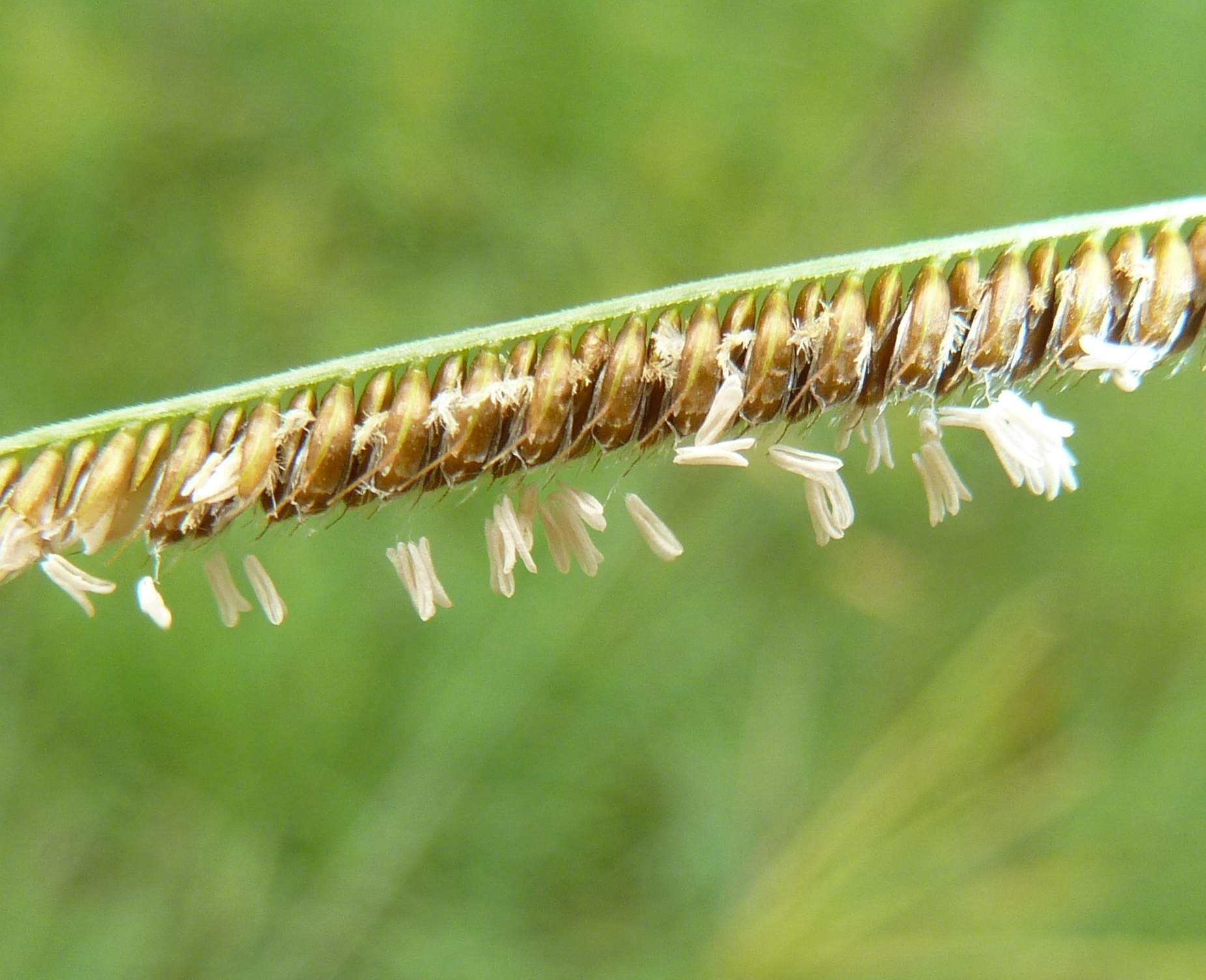
Open florets on the extended (green) rachilla of an E. paspaloides spikelet, showing the white anthers below, and feathery stigmas above.

== Former species ==
Some species formerly under Eustachys are under the genera Chloris or Ornithogalum, they include:

- Eustachys gayana - Chloris gayana
- Eustachys polystachya - Chloris submutica
- Eustachys submutica - Chloris submutica
- Eustachys latifolia - Ornithogalum arabicum
- Eustachys pyramidale - Ornithogalum pyramidale
