= Dichaetaria =

Scientific classification
- Kingdom: Plantae
- Clade: Tracheophytes
- Clade: Angiosperms
- Clade: Monocots
- Clade: Commelinids
- Order: Poales
- Family: Poaceae
- Subfamily: Panicoideae
- Genus: Dichaetaria; Nees ex Steud.
- Species: D. wightii

Binomial name
- Dichaetaria wightii Nees ex Steud.

Synonyms
- Aristida linarifolia Rottler ex Hook.f.; Gymnopogon rigidus Thwaites; Gymnopogon wightii (Nees ex Steud.) Koord.

Genus of grasses

Dichaetaria is a monotypic genus of South Asian plants in the grass family. Its only species is Dichaetaria wightii, native to southern India and Sri Lanka.

Dichaetaria wightii is a slender perennial herb with narrow flat leaves.
