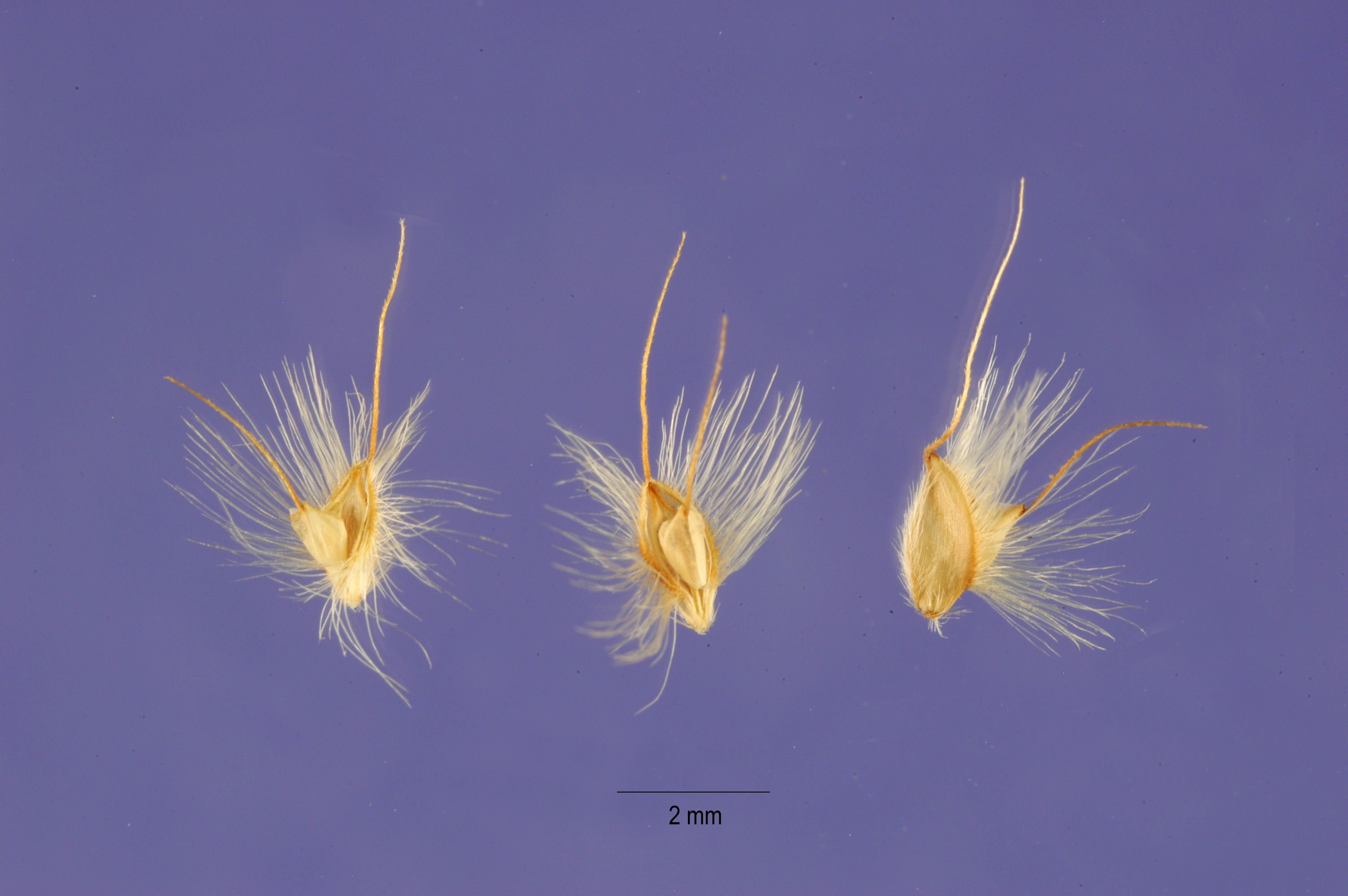
- Seedheads

Conservation status
- Secure (NatureServe)

Scientific classification
- Kingdom: Plantae
- Clade: Tracheophytes
- Clade: Angiosperms
- Clade: Monocots
- Clade: Commelinids
- Order: Poales
- Family: Poaceae
- Subfamily: Chloridoideae
- Genus: Stapfochloa
- Species: S. elata

Binomial name
- Stapfochloa elata (Desv.) P.M.Peterson (2015)

Synonyms
- Synonymy: Andropogon barbatus L. (1759); Andropogon polydactylos L. (1763), nom. superfl.; Chloris arundinacea Nees ex Steud. (1854); Chloris barbata (L.) Nash (1898), nom. illeg.; Chloris breviaristata (Hack.) Herter (1940); Chloris consanguinea Kunth (1829), nom. nud.; Chloris dandyana C.D.Adams (1971); Chloris dandyana var. breviaristata (Hack.) A.M.Molina & Rúgolo (2004); Chloris dandyana var. stolonifera (Parodi) A.M.Molina & Rúgolo (2004); Chloris elata Desv. (1831) (basionym); Chloris polydactyla Sw. (1788), nom. superfl.; Chloris polydactyla var. breviaristata Hack. (1900); Chloris polydactyla f. stolonifera Parodi (1953); Miscanthus polydactylos Voss (1895), nom. superfl.; Saccharum polydactylon Thunb. (1784), nom. superfl.

= Stapfochloa elata =

Species of plant

Stapfochloa elata (synonym Chloris elata) is a species of grass known by the common name tall windmill grass.

It is native to:

- North America, in the U.S. state of Florida (within southern Florida)
- Islands of the Caribbean, on Antigua and Barbuda (Antigua), Cuba, Hispaniola
- Central America in Honduras
- South America, in Brazil, Guyana, Suriname, Venezuela, Bolivia, Peru, Argentina, Paraguay, and Uruguay
