= Daknopholis =

Scientific classification
- Kingdom: Plantae
- Clade: Tracheophytes
- Clade: Angiosperms
- Clade: Monocots
- Clade: Commelinids
- Order: Poales
- Family: Poaceae
- Subfamily: Chloridoideae
- Tribe: Cynodonteae
- Subtribe: Eleusininae
- Genus: Daknopholis; Clayton
- Species: D. boivinii

Binomial name
- Daknopholis boivinii (A.Camus) Clayton

Synonyms
- Chloris boivinii A.Camus; Chloris ramosissima A.Camus; Chloris perrieri A.Camus; Chloris perrieri var. aristata A.Camus

Genus of grasses

Daknopholis is a genus of African and Indian Ocean plants in the grass family. The only known species is Daknopholis boivinii, native to Kenya, Tanzania, Mozambique, Aldabra and Madagascar.
