= Schoenefeldiella =

Scientific classification
- Kingdom: Plantae
- Clade: Tracheophytes
- Clade: Angiosperms
- Clade: Monocots
- Clade: Commelinids
- Order: Poales
- Family: Poaceae
- Subfamily: Chloridoideae
- Genus: Schoenefeldiella; P.M.Peterson (2021)
- Species: S. transiens

Binomial name
- Schoenefeldiella transiens (Pilg.) P.M.Peterson (2021)

Synonyms
- Chloris transiens Pilg. (1914); Schoenefeldia transiens (Pilg.) Chiov. (1916)

Genus of flowering plants

Schoenefeldiella transiens is a species of flowering plant in the grass family, Poaceae. It is the sole species in genus Schoenefeldiella. It is a perennial native to eastern and southern Africa, ranging from Ethiopia and Sudan to Mpumalanga in northern South Africa.

The species was first named Chloris transiens by Robert Knud Friedrich Pilger in 1914. In 1916, Emilio Chiovenda transferred it to the genus Schoenefeldia as Schoenefeldia transiens. In 2021 Paul M. Peterson placed it in the new monotypic genus Schoenefeldiella as Schoenefeldiella transiens. The new genus was based on a molecular phylogenetic study of the subtribe Eleusininae (tribe Cynodonteae), which found that Schoenefeldia as previously circumscribed was paraphyletic, with its two species forming a grade sister to the genus Afrotrichloris.
