= Chloris filiformis =

Scientific classification
- Domain: Eukaryota
- Kingdom: Animalia
- Phylum: Chordata
- Class: Aves
- Order: Passeriformes
- Family: Fringillidae
- Subfamily: Carduelinae
- Genus: Chloris
- Species: C. filiformis

Binomial name
- Chloris filiformis (Vahl) Poir.

Species of plant in the Indian Ocean islands

Chloris filiformis is a species of grass known to occur in Madagascar and Mauritius.
