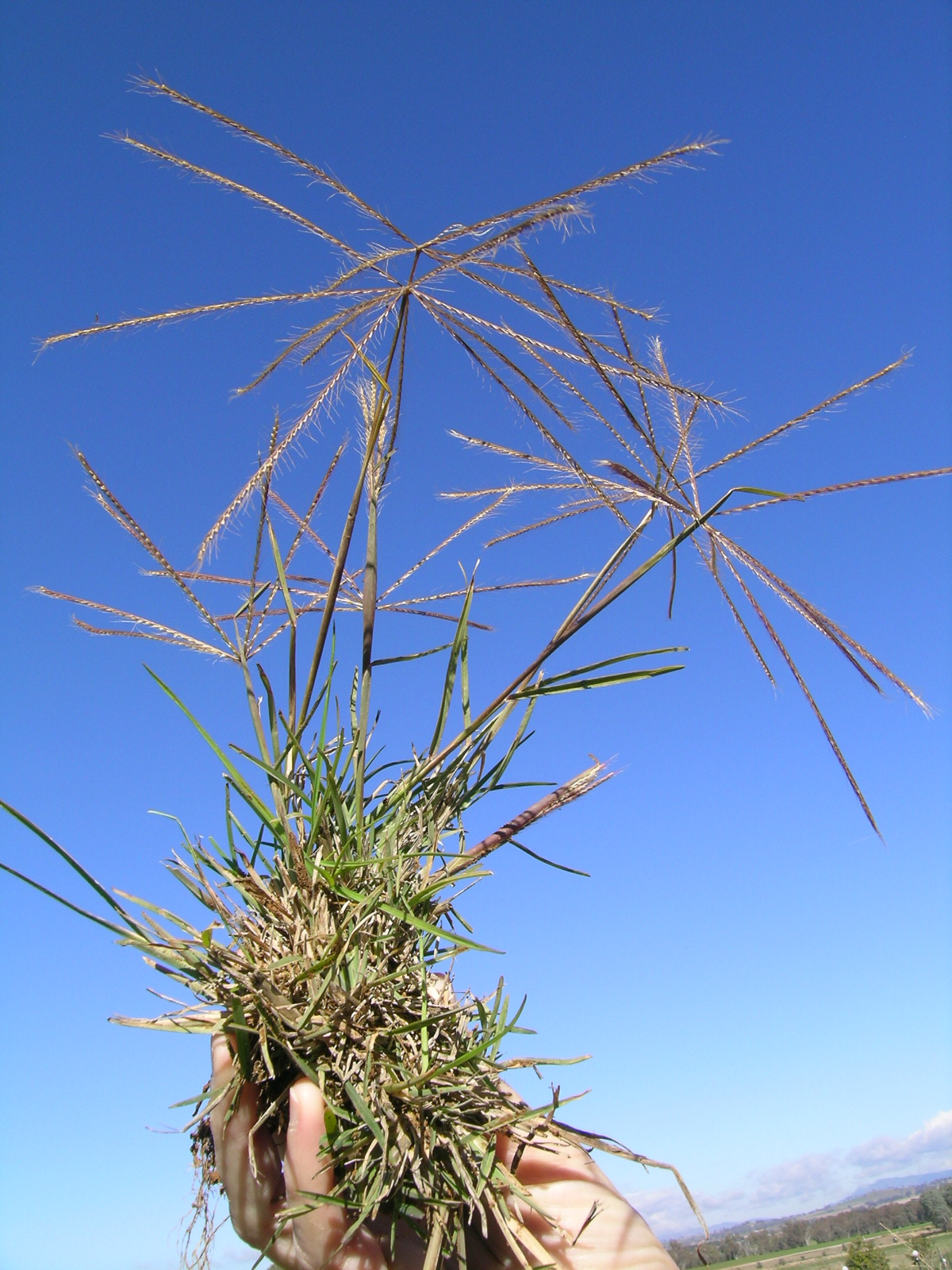

Scientific classification
- Kingdom: Plantae
- Clade: Tracheophytes
- Clade: Angiosperms
- Clade: Monocots
- Clade: Commelinids
- Order: Poales
- Family: Poaceae
- Subfamily: Chloridoideae
- Genus: Chloris
- Species: C. truncata

Binomial name
- Chloris truncata R.Br.

= Chloris truncata =

Species of plant

Chloris truncata, known by the common names Australian fingergrass, windmill-grass, Australian windmill grass and simply windmill grass locally in Australia, is a perennial grass.

Chloris truncata is a low-growing grass forming a small clump of around 30 centimetres in diameter. It has long leaves, approximately 10–15 cm long with a distinctive blunt tip and flattened leaf sheath at the base. It is light green in colour with a prominent central vein.

The plant gets its common name from its large windmill-shaped flowering heads, which can be around 30 cm across. Each of the long black spikes is lined with black seeds which have two awns each. Seed is set in both summer and winter. The plant spreads moderately fast, but is relatively hard to propagate. It prefers full sun and may be used as a lawn grass if mowed lightly.
