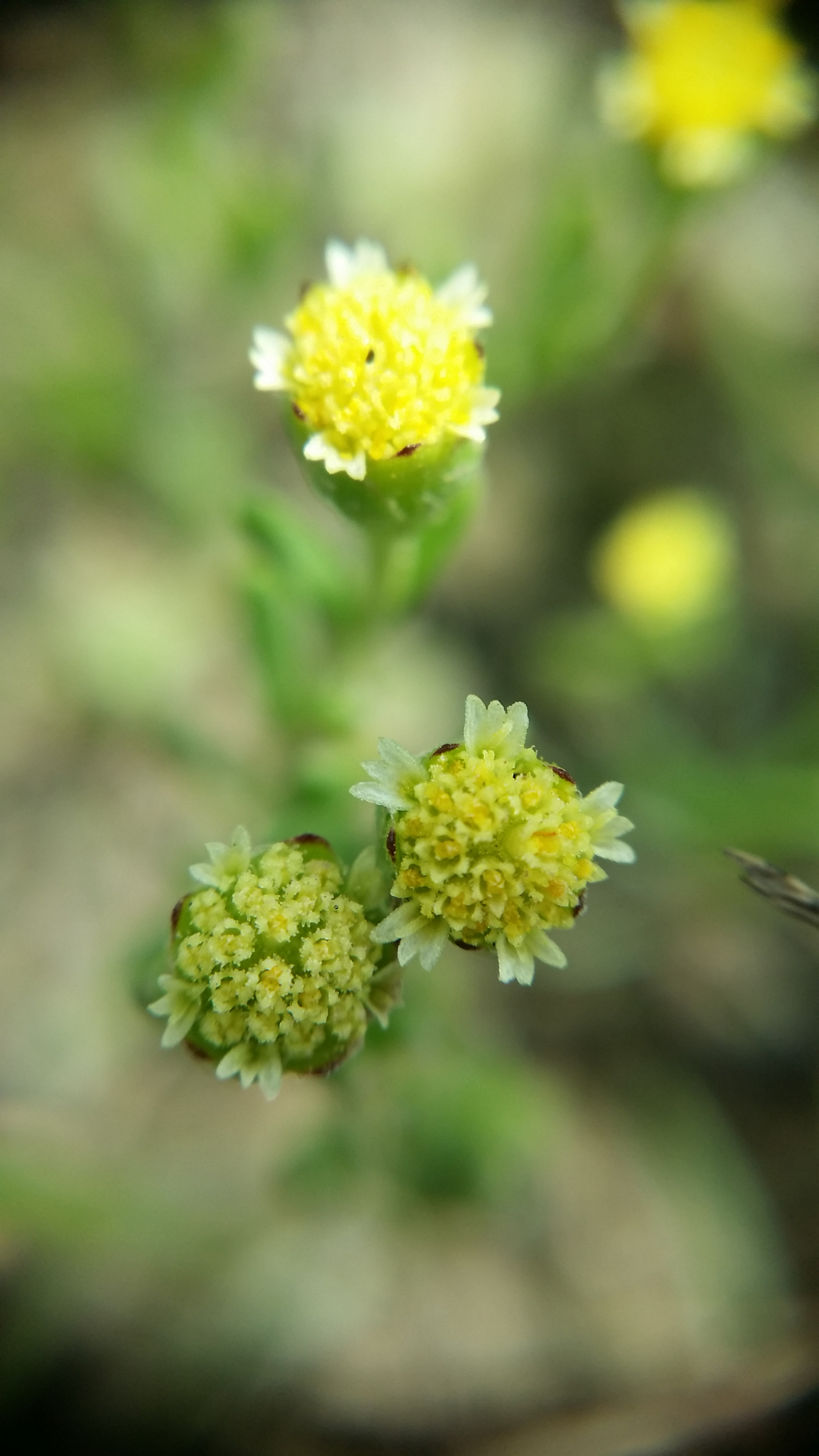

Conservation status
- Imperiled (NatureServe)

- Endangered (ESA)

Scientific classification
- Kingdom: Plantae
- Clade: Tracheophytes
- Clade: Angiosperms
- Clade: Eudicots
- Clade: Asterids
- Order: Asterales
- Family: Asteraceae
- Genus: Hymenoxys
- Species: H. texana

Binomial name
- Hymenoxys texana (J.M.Coult. & Rose) Cockerell

Synonyms
- Actinea texana (J.M.Coult. & Rose) Cory; Actinella texana J.M.Coult. & Rose 1891; Picradenia texana (J.M.Coult. & Rose) Greene

= Hymenoxys texana =

Species of flowering plant

Hymenoxys texana is a rare species of flowering plant in the aster family known by the common names prairie dawn, Texas prairie dawn-flower, and Texas bitterweed. It is endemic to Texas, where it is found primarily in the general vicinity of Houston. It is threatened by the loss of its habitat. It is a federally listed endangered species of the United States.

Hymenoxys texana is an annual herb with delicate reddish or purplish stems growing only 10 or 15 centimeters (4-6 inches) tall. The leaves have rubbery, glandular blades which may be simple or divided into lobes, particularly at mid-stem. The inflorescence is a solitary flower head or an open cluster of several heads. Each head is under a centimeter wide and has 6 to 8 yellow ray florets each 2 or 3 millimeters long. The ray florets are often tucked behind the phyllaries. The center of the head has 30–75 tiny disc florets.

Hymenoxys texana grows primarily in two ecoregions: the grasslands of the Western Gulf Coastal Plain and in the South Central Plains in Texas, although it has also been found in one county in the Texas Blackland Prairies. It can be found on open, barren stretches of saline sandy soil at the base of Mima mounds. The soil is often coated with a slick of algae (Nostoc sp.) during the wet season. The soil dries, cracks, and becomes powdery in the dry season. Few other plants occur on this substrate, but prairie dogshade (Limnosciadium pumilum) can sometimes be associated.

Hymenoxys texana is known only from six counties, all located in Texas: Harris, Fort Bend, Waller, Trinity, Gregg, and Madison Counties. It was first described in 1891 from a specimen taken near Hockley. Few specimens were noted after this and by 1979 the species was thought to be extinct. Just two years later it was relocated. The primary threat to Hymenoxys texana is habitat loss. Most of the occurrences of the plant are within or near the Houston metropolitan area, which is undergoing rapid growth. Habitat is being claimed for residential and other development.

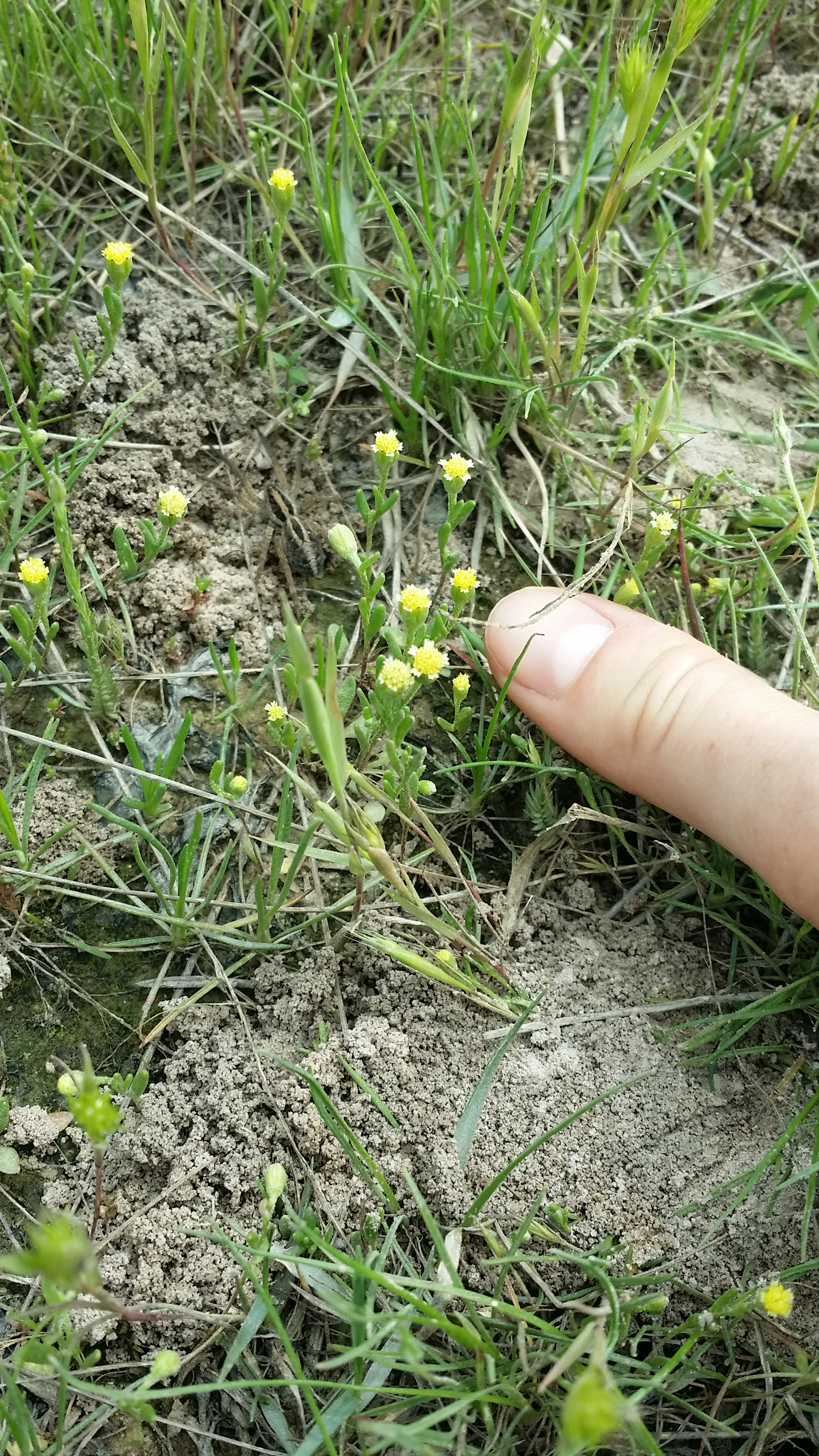
Hymenoxys texana

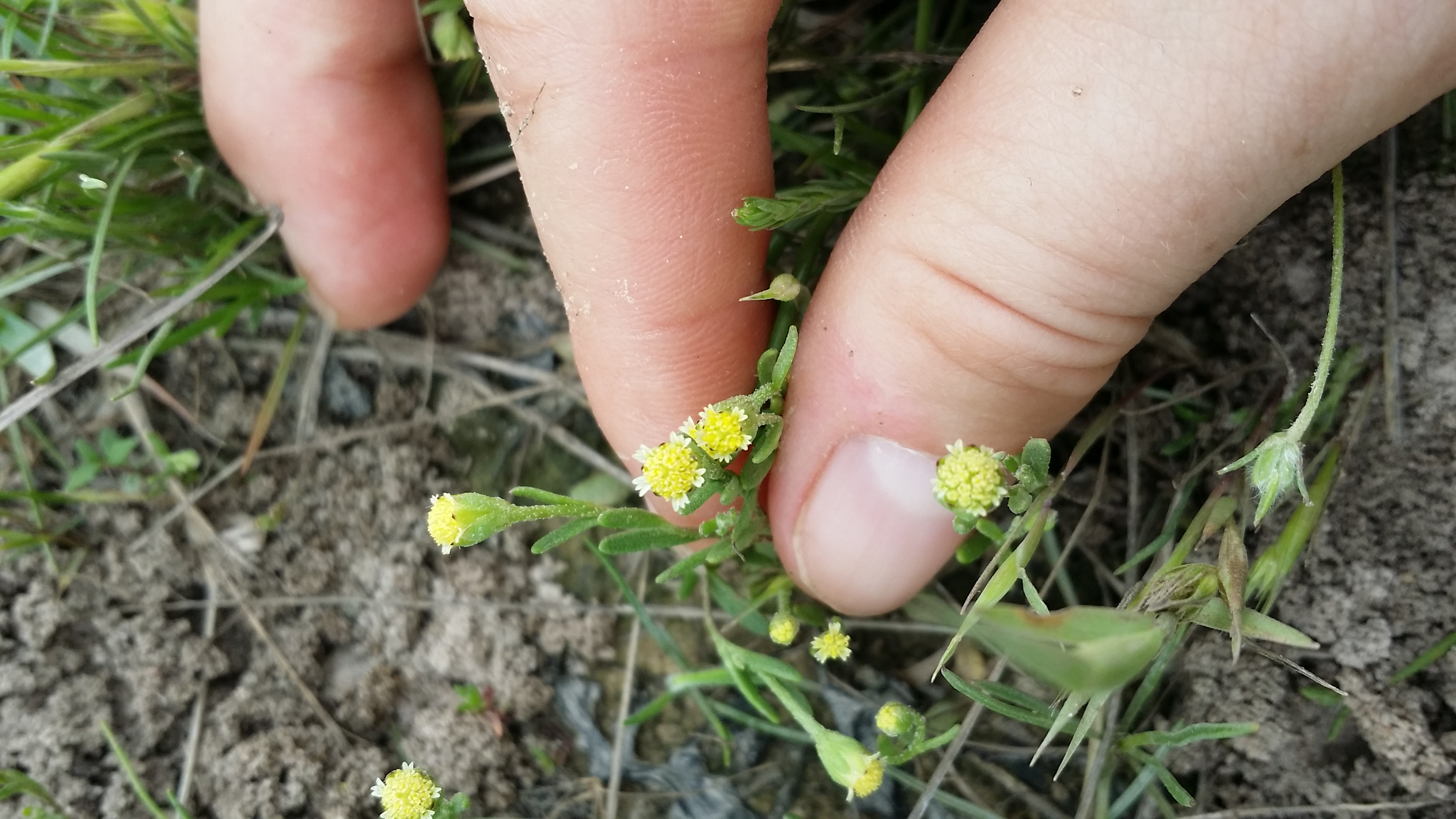
Hymenoxys texana
