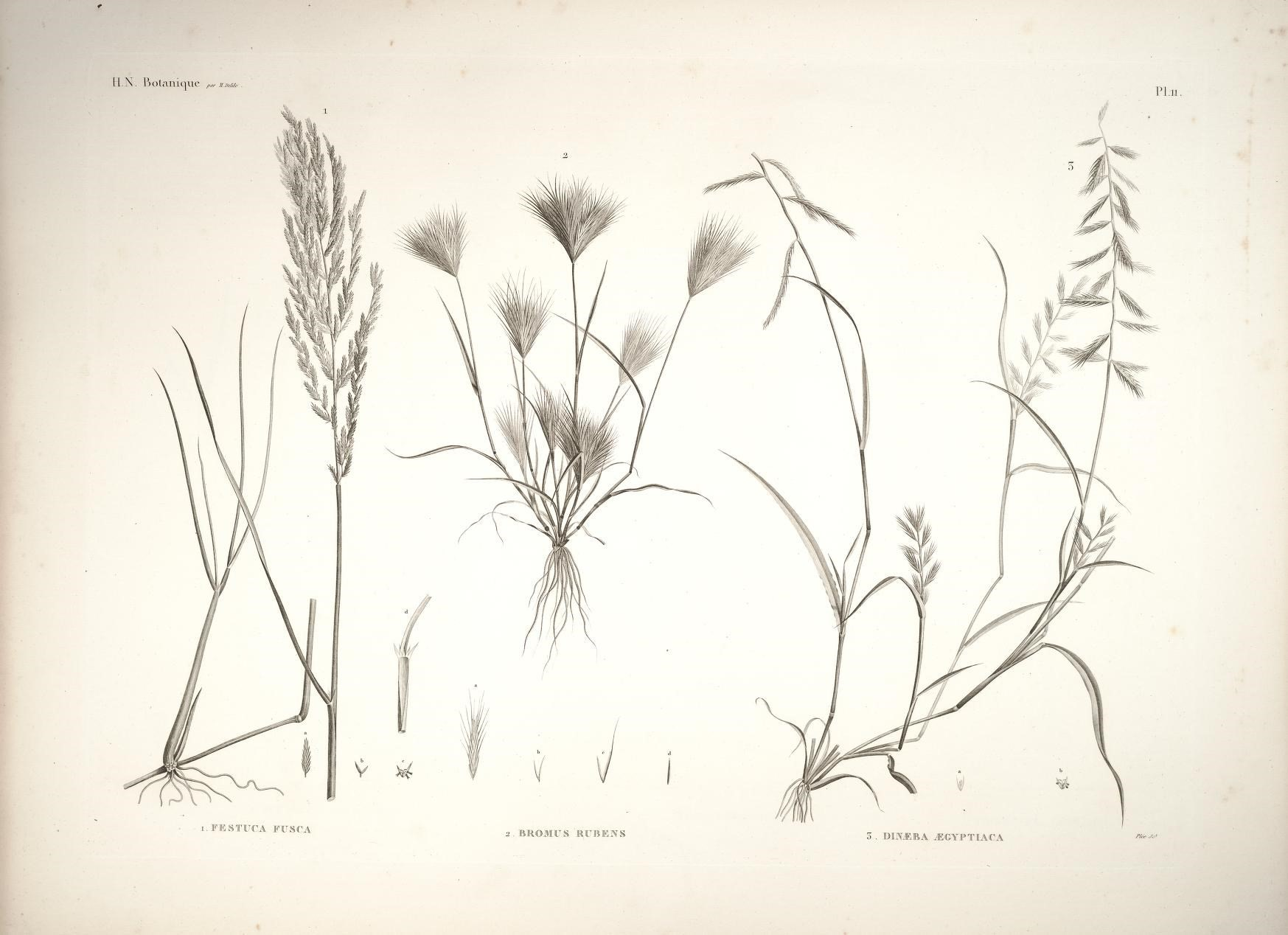
- Dinebra retroflexa (right plant)

Scientific classification
- Kingdom: Plantae
- Clade: Tracheophytes
- Clade: Angiosperms
- Clade: Monocots
- Clade: Commelinids
- Order: Poales
- Family: Poaceae
- Subfamily: Chloridoideae
- Tribe: Cynodonteae
- Subtribe: Eleusininae
- Genus: Dinebra; Jacq. 1809 not DC. 1813

Type species
- Dinebra arabica (syn of D. retroflexa) Jacq.

Synonyms
- Drake-brockmania Stapf; Heterocarpha Stapf & C.E.Hubb.

= Dinebra =

Genus of grasses

Dinebra is a genus of plants native to the world's tropics and the U.S.A.; it belongs to the grass family.

== Species ==
- Dinebra aquatica (Scribn. & Merr.) P.M.Peterson & N.Snow
- Dinebra caudata (K.Schum.) P.M.Peterson & N.Snow
- Dinebra chinensis (L.) P.M.Peterson & N.Snow
- Dinebra coerulescens (Steud.) P.M.Peterson & N.Snow
- Dinebra decipiens (R.Br.) P.M.Peterson & N.Snow
- Dinebra divaricatissima (S.T.Blake) P.M.Peterson & N.Snow
- Dinebra haareri (Stapf & C.E.Hubb.) P.M.Peterson & N.Snow
- Dinebra ligulata (Lazarides) P.M.Peterson & N.Snow
- Dinebra marquisensis (F.Br.) P.M.Peterson & N.Snow
- Dinebra nealleyi (Vasey) P.M.Peterson & N.Snow
- Dinebra panicea (Retz.) P.M.Peterson & N.Snow
- Dinebra panicoides (J.Presl) P.M.Peterson & N.Snow
- Dinebra perrieri (A.Camus) Bosser
- Dinebra polycarpha S.M.Phillips
- Dinebra polystachyos (R.Br.) E.A.Kellogg
- Dinebra restusigluma N.Snow & P.M.Peterson
- Dinebra retroflexa (Vahl) Panz.
- Dinebra scabra (Nees) P.M.Peterson & N.Snow
- Dinebra simoniana (N.Snow) P.M.Peterson & N.Snow
- Dinebra somalensis (Stapf) P.M.Peterson & N.Snow
- Dinebra southwoodii (N.Snow & B.K.Simon) P.M.Peterson & N.Snow
- Dinebra squarrosa (Pilg.) P.M.Peterson & N.Snow
- Dinebra srilankensis (N.Snow) P.M.Peterson & N.Snow
- Dinebra viscida (Scribn.) P.M.Peterson & N.Snow
- Dinebra xerophila (P.M.Peterson & Judz.) P.M.Peterson & N.Snow

formerly included

see Bouteloua Brachypodium Cutandia Desmostachya Enteropogon Heteranthoecia Leptochloa Tripogon Wangenheimia

- Dinebra americana - Bouteloua americana
- Dinebra aquatica - Leptochloa aquatica
- Dinebra aristidoides - Bouteloua aristidoides
- Dinebra bromoides - Bouteloua radicosa
- Dinebra calycina - Tripogon bromoides
- Dinebra caudata - Leptochloa caudata
- Dinebra chinensis - Leptochloa chinensis
- Dinebra chloridea - Enteropogon chlorideus
- Dinebra chondrosioides - Bouteloua chondrosioides
- Dinebra coerulescens - Leptochloa coerulescens
- Dinebra cristata - Bouteloua triaena
- Dinebra curtipendula - Bouteloua curtipendula
- Dinebra decipiens - Leptochloa decipiens
- Dinebra divaricata - Cutandia memphitica
- Dinebra divaricatissima - Leptochloa divaricatissima
- Dinebra dura - Desmostachya bipinnata
- Dinebra guineensis - Heteranthoecia guineensis
- Dinebra hirsuta - Bouteloua aristidoides
- Dinebra hirta - Leptochloa hirta
- Dinebra juncifolia - Bouteloua repens
- Dinebra ligulata - Leptochloa ligulata
- Dinebra lima - Wangenheimia lima
- Dinebra melicoides - Bouteloua curtipendula
- Dinebra nealleyi - Leptochloa nealleyi
- Dinebra neesii - Leptochloa neesii
- Dinebra panicea - Leptochloa panicea
- Dinebra panicoides - Leptochloa panicoides
- Dinebra pubescens - Brachypodium flexum
- Dinebra repens - Bouteloua repens
- Dinebra scabra - Leptochloa scabra
- Dinebra secunda - Bouteloua curtipendula
- Dinebra simoniana - Bouteloua curtipendula
- Dinebra southwoodii - Leptochloa southwoodii
- Dinebra squarrosa - Leptochloa squarrosa
- Dinebra srilankensis - Leptochloa srilankensis
- Dinebra tuaensis - Heteranthoecia guineensis
- Dinebra verticillata - Leptochloa wightiana
