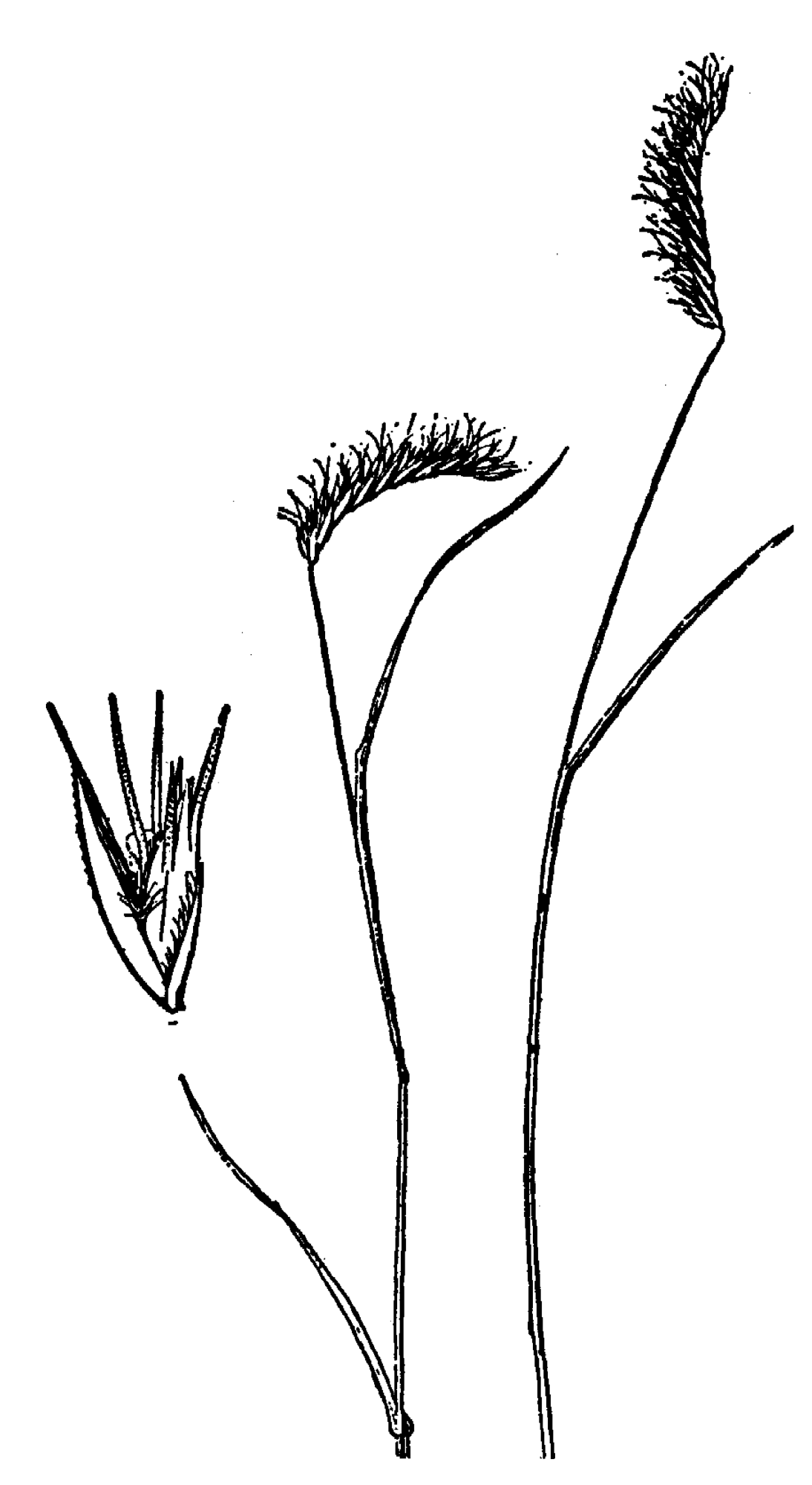
- Two inflorescences of Bouteloua simplex, along with a single spikelet at left

Scientific classification
- Kingdom: Plantae
- Clade: Tracheophytes
- Clade: Angiosperms
- Clade: Monocots
- Clade: Commelinids
- Order: Poales
- Family: Poaceae
- Subfamily: Chloridoideae
- Genus: Bouteloua
- Species: B. simplex

Binomial name
- Bouteloua simplex Lag.

Synonyms
- Chondrosum procumbens Desv. ex P. Beauv. Chondrosum prostratum (Lag.) Sweet

= Bouteloua simplex =

Perennial grass native to North America

Bouteloua simplex, colloquially known as matted grama or mat grama, is a grass species in the grama genus native to much of the Americas.

== Description ==
Matted grama is forms dense mats and is a low growing annual, reaching no higher than 15 cm (5.9 in). Individual blades often curl up; they are short and narrow. Flowering occurs from August to October. The plant bears a single curved spiked inflorescence 1–2.5 cm (0.39–0.98 in) long. Each inflorescence bears 30-80 spikelets. The glumes are hairless, with lower glumes being 1.5–2.5 mm (0.059–0.098 in) long and upper glumes 3.5–5 mm (0.14–0.20 in) long. The lemma is hairy at the base, is 2.5–3.5 mm (0.098–0.138 in) long, and three awned.

It is similar to Bouteloua barbata, but bears only a single spike.

== Distribution ==
Matted grama is widespread in the Americas. It is present in the southwestern and central United States, found as far north as Wyoming, as west as Arizona and Utah, and as east as Texas and Nebraska. An introduced population also exists in Maine, although it is not common there and grows only in disturbed areas. It is present in all the northern states of Mexico, including Baja. Populations exist in most of Central America, excepting parts of the Yucatán Peninsula, and extending to Panama. In South America it is found in Ecuador, Colombia, Peru, Bolivia, and parts of Argentina and Chile.

It prefers to grow on rocky slopes between 1,200–2,100 m (4,000–7,000 ft).

== Ethnobotany ==
Ashes of the plant had historical use in ceremony, and as a folk remedy. It was also used for livestock forage.
