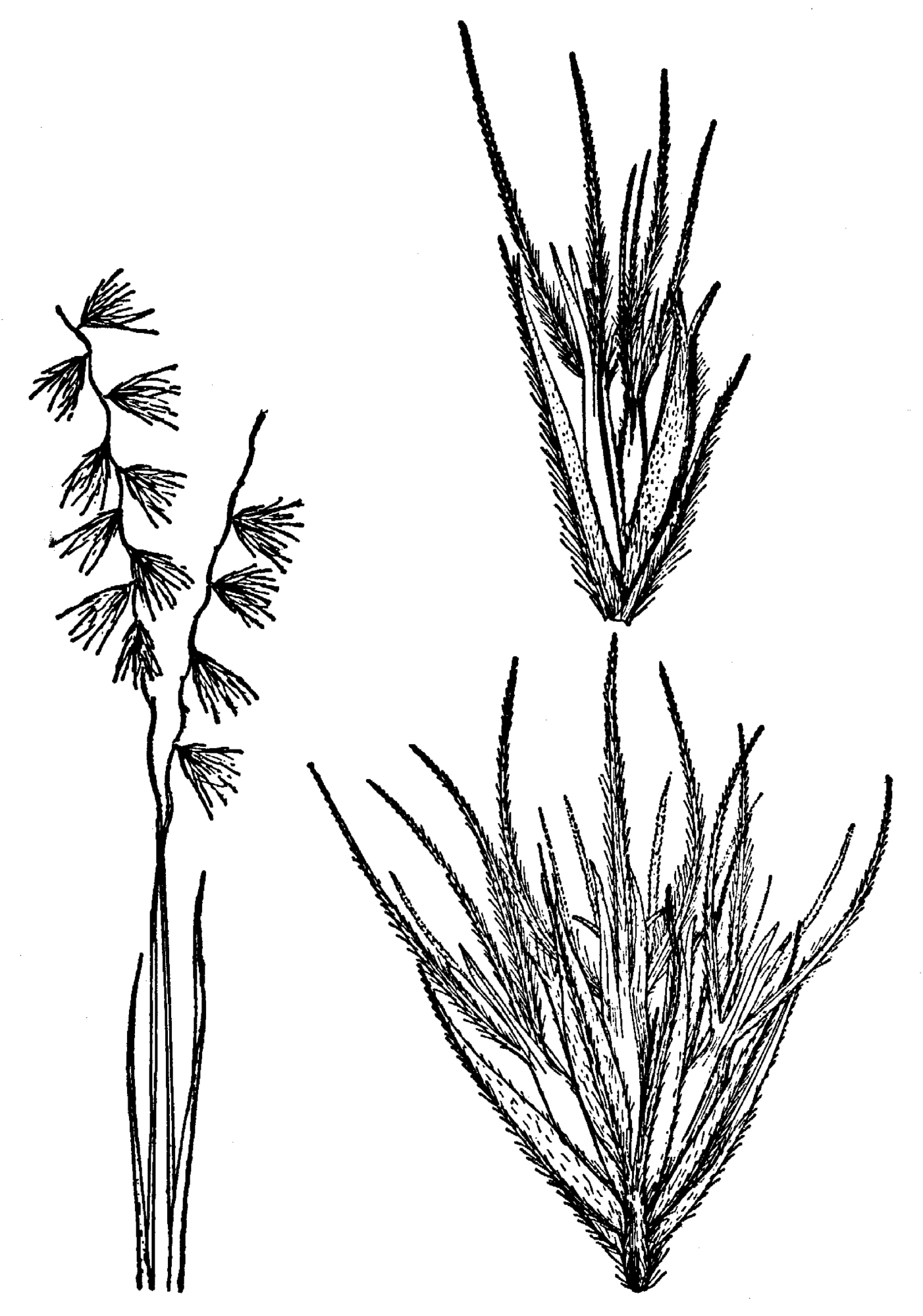

Scientific classification
- Kingdom: Plantae
- Clade: Tracheophytes
- Clade: Angiosperms
- Clade: Monocots
- Clade: Commelinids
- Order: Poales
- Family: Poaceae
- Subfamily: Chloridoideae
- Genus: Bouteloua
- Species: B. eludens

Binomial name
- Bouteloua eludens Griffiths

= Bouteloua eludens =

Perennial grass native to North America

Bouteloua eludens, colloquially known as Santa Rita grama or sometimes Santa Rita Mountain grama, is a grass species in the grama genus native to southern Arizona in the United States and northern Sonora in Mexico.

== Description ==
Santa Rita grama is a perennial grass growing between 25 cm (9.8 in) and 70 cm (28 in) tall. Grass blades measures 1 mm (0.039 in) to 2.5 mm (0.098 in) wide; they are flat, firm, light green in color, and covered in a glaucous coating. Each blade measures 1 mm (0.039 in) to 2.5 mm (0.098 in) wide. The base of the plant is rhizome like. Inflorescences are borne in groups of 8 to 18.

== Distribution ==
Santa Rita grama prefers to grow at heights of 4,000 ft (1,200 m) to 5,000 ft (1,500 m), and in dry rocky slopes or desert grasslands. It is known to live in the Santa Rita Mountains (from which it takes its name), the Santa Catalina Mountains, Nogales, and parts of Sonora. It is a fairly rare species across its range.
