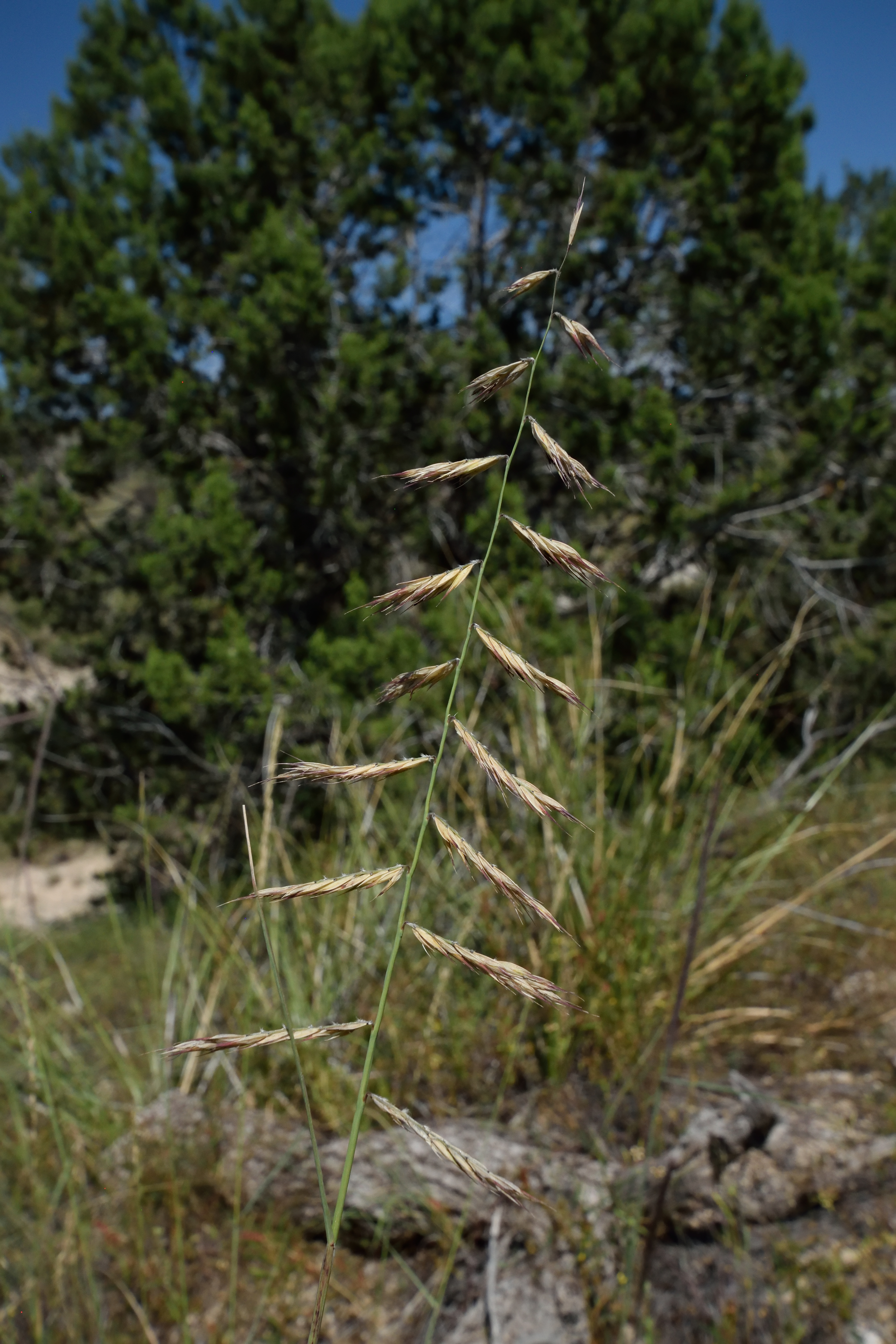
- Inflorescence at left, with a single floret at right

Scientific classification
- Kingdom: Plantae
- Clade: Tracheophytes
- Clade: Angiosperms
- Clade: Monocots
- Clade: Commelinids
- Order: Poales
- Family: Poaceae
- Subfamily: Chloridoideae
- Genus: Bouteloua
- Species: B. radicosa

Binomial name
- Bouteloua radicosa (Fourn.) Griffiths

= Bouteloua radicosa =

Species of grass

Bouteloua radicosa, colloquially known as purple grama, is a grass species in the grama genus native to the southwestern United States and northern Mexico.

== Description ==
Purple grama is a perennial grass that grows to 80 cm (31 in) tall, with a dense rhizomatous base. It bears inflorescences in panicles that are 10–15 cm (3.9–5.9 in) long and usually have seven to twelve branches. Branches are to 20–30 cm (7.9–11.8 in) long and bear eight to eleven spikelets. Each spikelet bears two florets. The lower floret has a three awned lemma.

B. radicosa may hybridize with Bouteloua repens and Bouteloua williamsii, which could contribute to its apparent diversity.

== Distribution ==
Purple grama is found between 3,500–7,000 ft (1,100–2,100 m) and prefers desert grasslands or dry rocky slopes. It is present in Arizona, New Mexico, and California. It was introduced to Maine, although it remains uncommon there.
