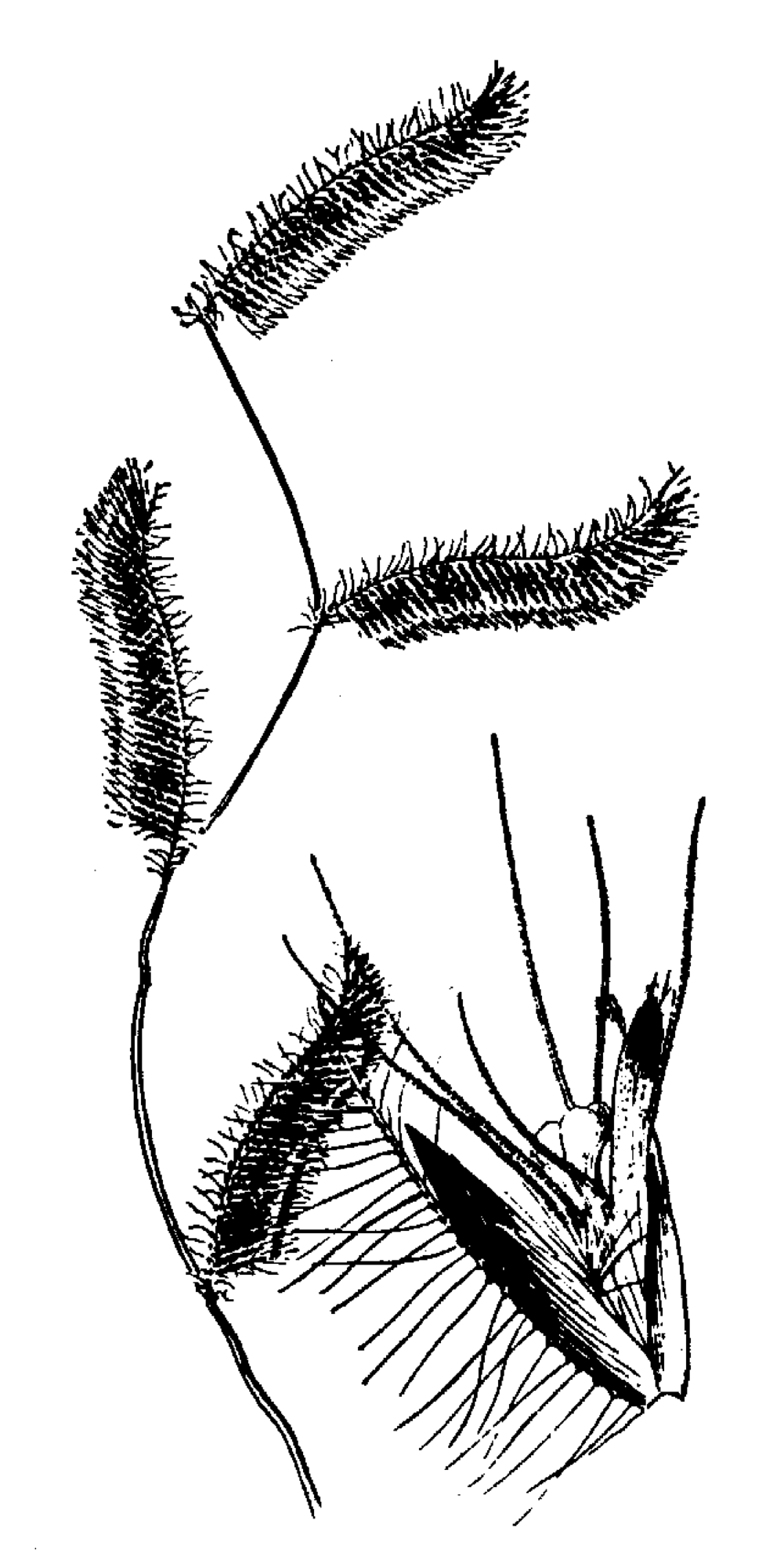
- Inflorescence at left, with a single floret at right

Scientific classification
- Kingdom: Plantae
- Clade: Tracheophytes
- Clade: Angiosperms
- Clade: Monocots
- Clade: Commelinids
- Order: Poales
- Family: Poaceae
- Subfamily: Chloridoideae
- Genus: Bouteloua
- Species: B. parryi

Binomial name
- Bouteloua parryi (E. Fourn.) Griffiths

Synonyms
- Chondrosium parryi (E. Fourn.)

= Bouteloua parryi =

Perennial grass native to North America

Bouteloua parryi, colloquially known as Parry's grama, is a grass species in the grama genus native to the southwestern United States and northern Mexico.

== Description ==
Parry's grama is annual grass that grows 20–60 cm (7.9–23.6 in) tall, although sometimes to 80 cm (31 in). Flowers are born in inflorescences which consist of three to seven spicate branches per culm. They are blue-violet at maturity.

== Taxonomy ==
Several varieties exist. B. parryi var. parryi is a stoloniferous perennial which has papillose hairs on its upper glumes. B. parryi var. gentryi differs in being a tufted annual.

== Distribution ==
Parry's grama prefers rocky slopes or desert grasslands between 910 m (3,000 ft) and 1,700 m (5,500 ft), although it can grow anywhere between sealevel and 2,000 m (6,600 ft). It is present in Texas, Arizona, New Mexico, and northern Mexico.
