= Bouteloua breviseta =

Conservation status
- Secure (NatureServe)

Scientific classification
- Kingdom: Plantae
- Clade: Tracheophytes
- Clade: Angiosperms
- Clade: Monocots
- Clade: Commelinids
- Order: Poales
- Family: Poaceae
- Subfamily: Chloridoideae
- Genus: Bouteloua
- Species: B. breviseta

Binomial name
- Bouteloua breviseta Vasey

Species of flowering plant

Bouteloua breviseta is a species of grass known by the common names gypsum grama and chino grama.

== Distribution ==
It is native to the Chihuahuan Desert, in New Mexico and Texas in the United States and Chihuahua on the northern Mexican Plateau in Mexico.

== Description ==
Bouteloua breviseta is a perennial grass that is sometimes rhizomatous. The stems are tough at the bases and grow up to 40 centimeters tall. The leaf blades are generally just a few centimeters long.

The inflorescence is 2 to 4 centimeters long and may have branches. The grass mainly reproduces by budding, and sometimes by seed.

== Uses ==
This grass is used for grazing and it may be added to a hay mix. It does not stand up to overgrazing, but it is adaptable to poor conditions and it can take hold where other grasses cannot grow.
