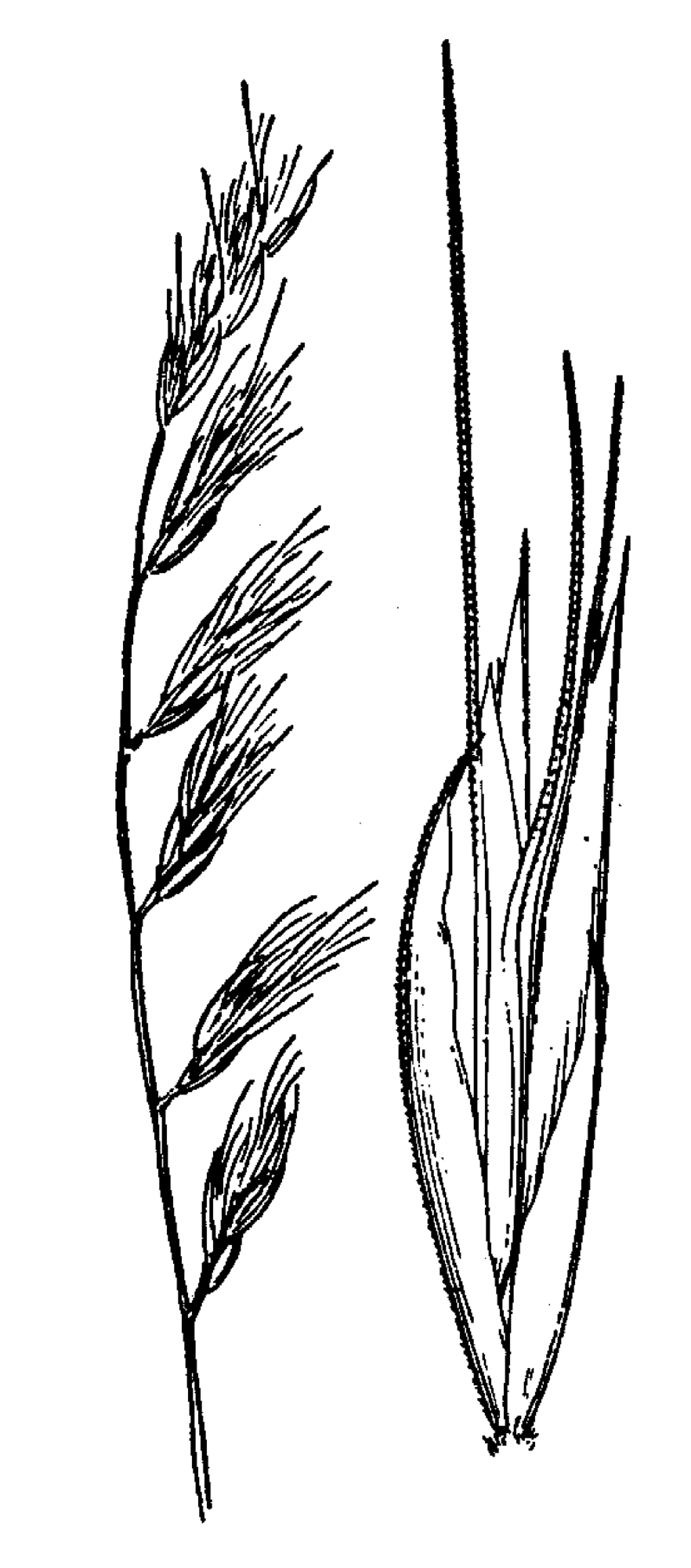
- Inflorescence at left, with a single floret at right, showing long central awn

Scientific classification
- Kingdom: Plantae
- Clade: Tracheophytes
- Clade: Angiosperms
- Clade: Monocots
- Clade: Commelinids
- Order: Poales
- Family: Poaceae
- Subfamily: Chloridoideae
- Genus: Bouteloua
- Species: B. repens

Binomial name
- Bouteloua repens (Kunth) Scribn.

Synonyms
- B. filiformis (Fourn.) Griffiths; Bouteloua heterostega (Trin.) Griffiths; Dinebra repens Kunth

= Bouteloua repens =

Perennial grass native to North America

Bouteloua repens, colloquially known as slender grama, is a grass species in the grama genus native to the southwestern United States and northern Mexico.

== Description ==
Slender grama is a perennial grass that appears similar to Bouteloua chondrosioides. Leaves grow to 20 cm (7.9 in) tall. Its flowers are borne in inflorescences at the tip of culms in groups of four to twelve. The central lobe has an extended awn. The glumes are hairless. The orange or yellow anthers are 3–5.5 mm (0.12–0.22 in) in length. It does not form rhizomes. It is exceptionally resistant to cattle grazing.

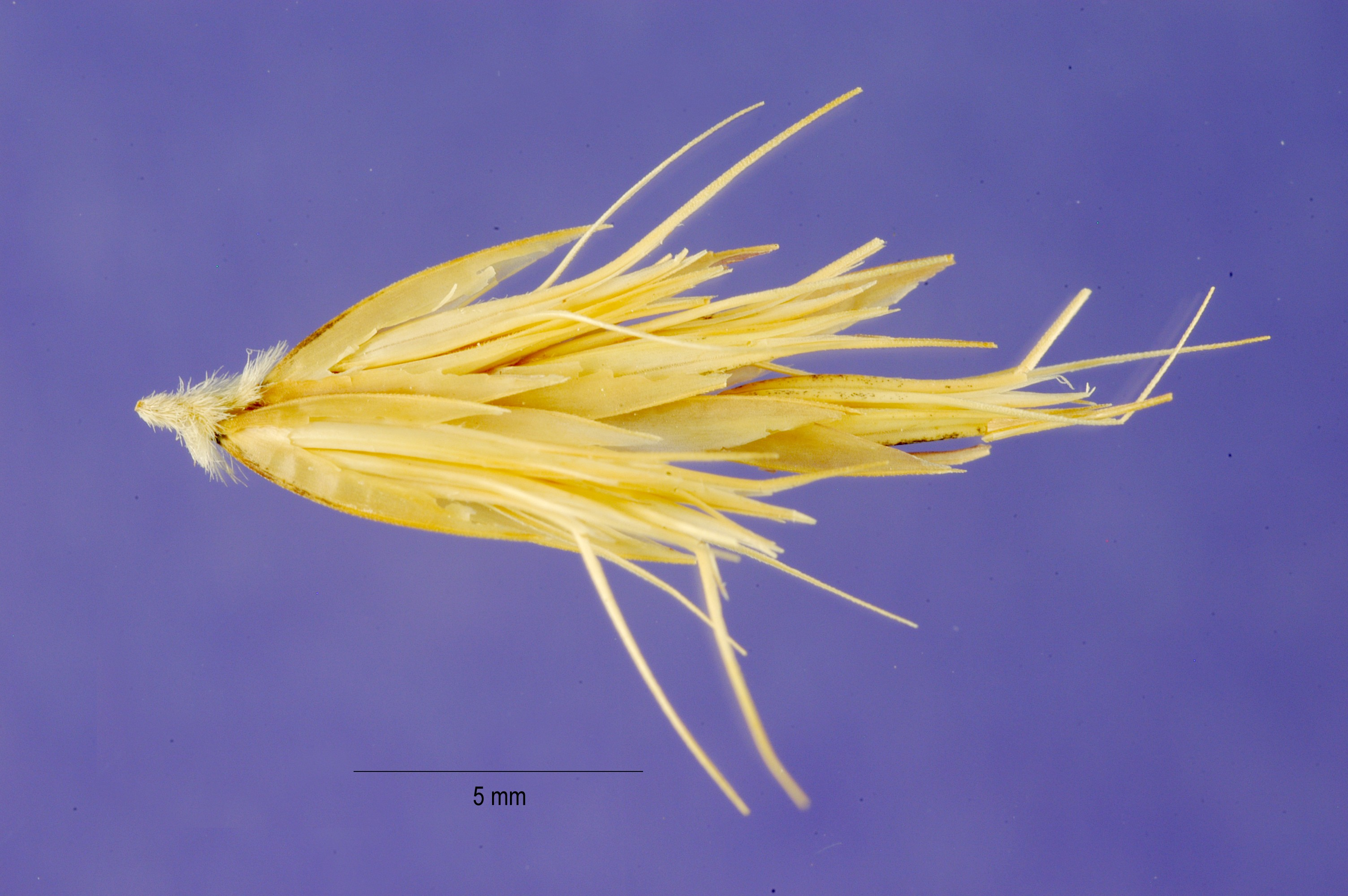
Bouteloua repens floret

== Distribution ==
Slender grama prefers dry rocky slopes below 1,500 m (4,900 ft), but will also tolerate most open areas of mixed soil types and can be found up 2,500 m (8,200 ft). It is present in much of Arizona, as well as into Texas, New Mexico, and Mexico. It is also found in the Caribbean, and Central America as far south as Colombia and Venezuela.
