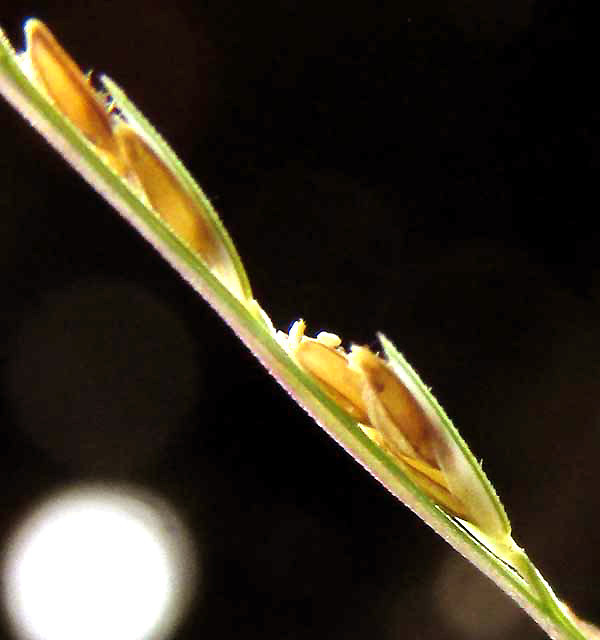
- Dinebra panicea spikelets

Scientific classification
- Kingdom: Plantae
- Clade: Tracheophytes
- Clade: Angiosperms
- Clade: Monocots
- Clade: Commelinids
- Order: Poales
- Family: Poaceae
- Subfamily: Chloridoideae
- Genus: Dinebra
- Species: D. panicea

Binomial name
- Dinebra panicea (Retz.) P.M.Peterson & N.Snow

Synonyms
- Leptochloa panicea (Retz.) Ohwi (1941); Poa panicea Retz. (1783)

= Dinebra panicea =

Species of grass

Dinebra panicea is a plant species belonging to the family Poaceae.

== Description ==
Inflorescences are much-branched panicles in which the spikelets' uppermost florets (tiny grass flowers with no petals) are reduced to small rudiments, and the spikelets themselves separate above the glumes at maturity. Leaf sheaths (leaf bases clasping the stems) bear long hairs with bulbous bases, and ligules at leaf bases are conspicuous, membranous, topped with a fringe of hairs, and irregularly toothed, as seen below: Spikelets are relatively small, contain 2-4 florets, and are 1.8–3 mm long, as seen below:

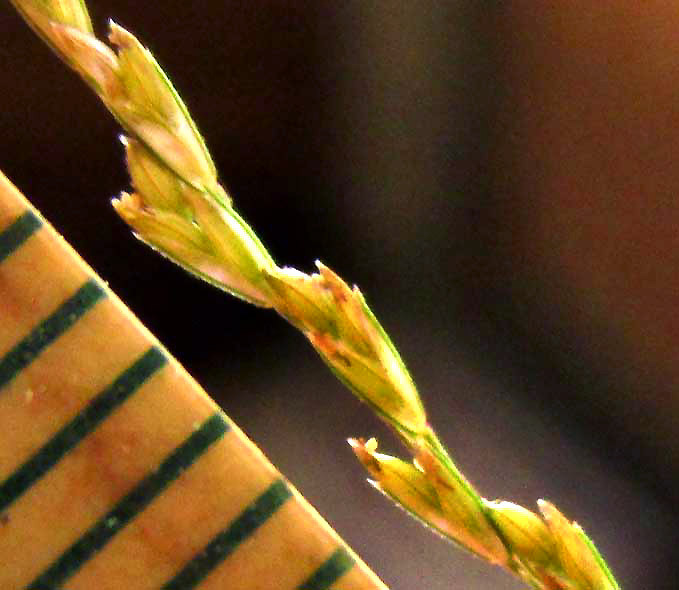
spikelets next to scale marked in millimeters

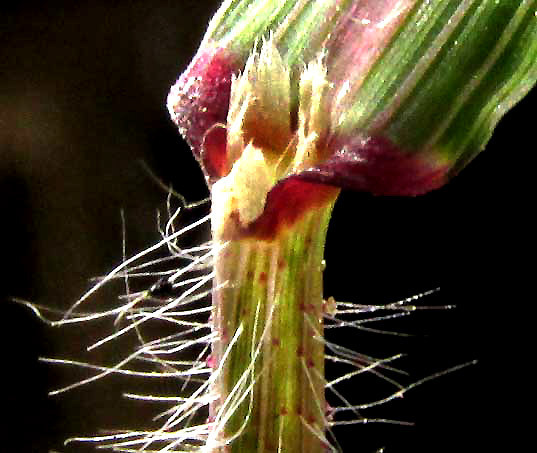
hairy-topped ligule and long-hairy sheath

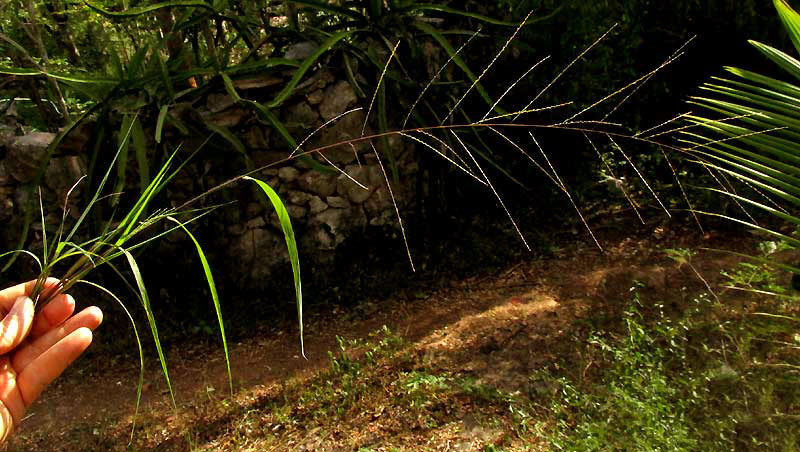
panicle of Dinebra panicea

== Distribution ==
On the iNaturalist distribution map for Dinebra panicea, observations of the species are documented -- both in its native areas and as an invasive -- in the Americas from the central US south to Chile and Brazil, southern Asia, and spottily elsewhere in Africa, Europe, Australia and Oceania.

== Habitat ==
Both subspecies panicea and brachiata are described as occurring in wetlands, swamps, or streams in open lowland regions, as well as waste places, gardens and rice fields. In the southeastern US, subspecies mucronata is said to occur on sandy shores and in disturbed areas.

== Ecology ==
In the Great Plains region of the US, Dinebra panicea is designated as a facultative wetland species, meaning that usually it occur in wetlands, but may occur in non-wetlands. It is listed as a weed by the International Livestock Research Institute.

== Etymology ==
The genus name Dinebra is a corruption of the Arabic word danaiba, meaning "a little tail," possibly alluding to the tapering, or acuminate, tips of the spikelets' glumes.

In 1783, Anders Jahan Retzius probably chose to use the species name panicea because the grass's spikelets are arranged in a large, classic panicle. The word "panicle" derives from the Latin panicula, which is the diminutive form of panus, meaning "ear of millet." Millet is a general name applying to several small-seeded grasses producing edible grains; most millets belong to the grass tribe Paniceae, whose species produce panicle-type inflorescences.

== Taxonomy ==
In many texts, Dinebra panicea is treated as Leptochloa filiformis.

In 2021, after a detailed genetic study of several genera of the subtribe Eleusininae, the genus Dinebra, which for most of the century incorporated 3 species, was enlarged to ±23 species. Dinebra and the 27 other genera in the Eleusininae appear to have originated in Africa.

=== Subspecies ===
Dinebra panicea contains the following subspecies:

- Dinebra panicea subsp. mucronata (Steud.) P.M.Peterson & N.Snow (2012) -- the Americas
- Dinebra panicea subsp. panicea -- tropical and subtropical Asia
- Dinebra panicea subsp. brachiata (Steud.) P.M.Peterson & N.Snow (2012) -- the Americas
