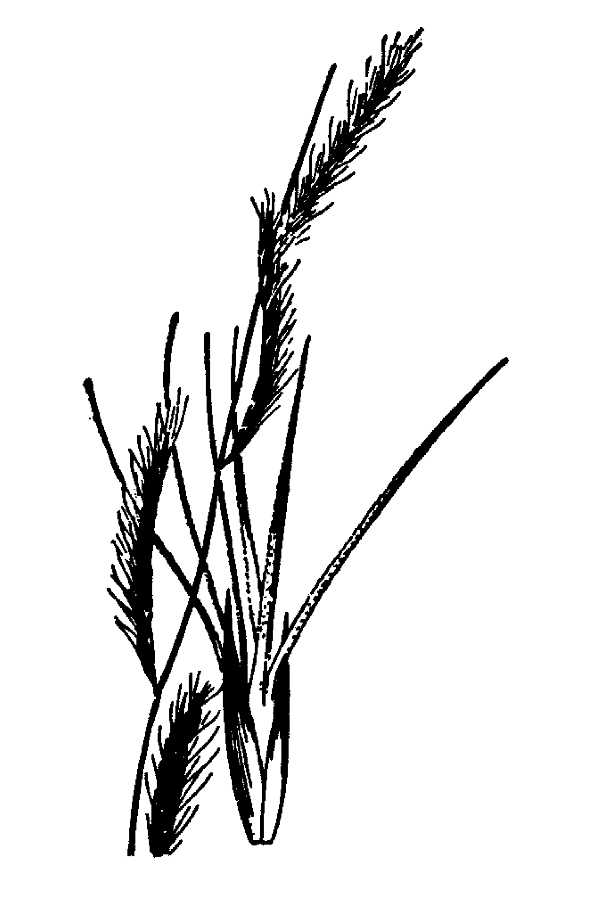

Scientific classification
- Kingdom: Plantae
- Clade: Tracheophytes
- Clade: Angiosperms
- Clade: Monocots
- Clade: Commelinids
- Order: Poales
- Family: Poaceae
- Subfamily: Chloridoideae
- Genus: Bouteloua
- Species: B. trifida

Binomial name
- Bouteloua trifida Thurb.

= Bouteloua trifida =

Species of flowering plant

Bouteloua trifida is a species of grass known by the common name red grama. It is native to central and northern Mexico and the Southwestern United States, where it grows in desert scrub and other dry areas.

This is a small perennial grass growing up to about 30 centimeters in maximum height. It occasionally grows a small rhizome. The thready leaves are no more than 5 centimeters long. The inflorescence bears widely spaced spikelets which are reddish purple in color. Each spikelet has three awns at the tip.

Typically it flowers between March and September.
