= Heteranthoecia =

Scientific classification
- Kingdom: Plantae
- Clade: Tracheophytes
- Clade: Angiosperms
- Clade: Monocots
- Clade: Commelinids
- Order: Poales
- Family: Poaceae
- Subfamily: Micrairoideae
- Tribe: Isachneae
- Genus: Heteranthoecia; Stapf
- Species: H. guineensis

Binomial name
- Heteranthoecia guineensis (Franch.) Robyns

Synonyms
- Heteranthoecia isachnoides Stapf (type species); Dinebra guineensis Franch.; Dinebra tuaensis Vanderyst

Genus of grasses

Heteranthoecia is a genus of African plants in the grass family. The only known species is Heteranthoecia guineensis, which is widespread across much of tropical Africa from Senegal to Tanzania and Angola.
