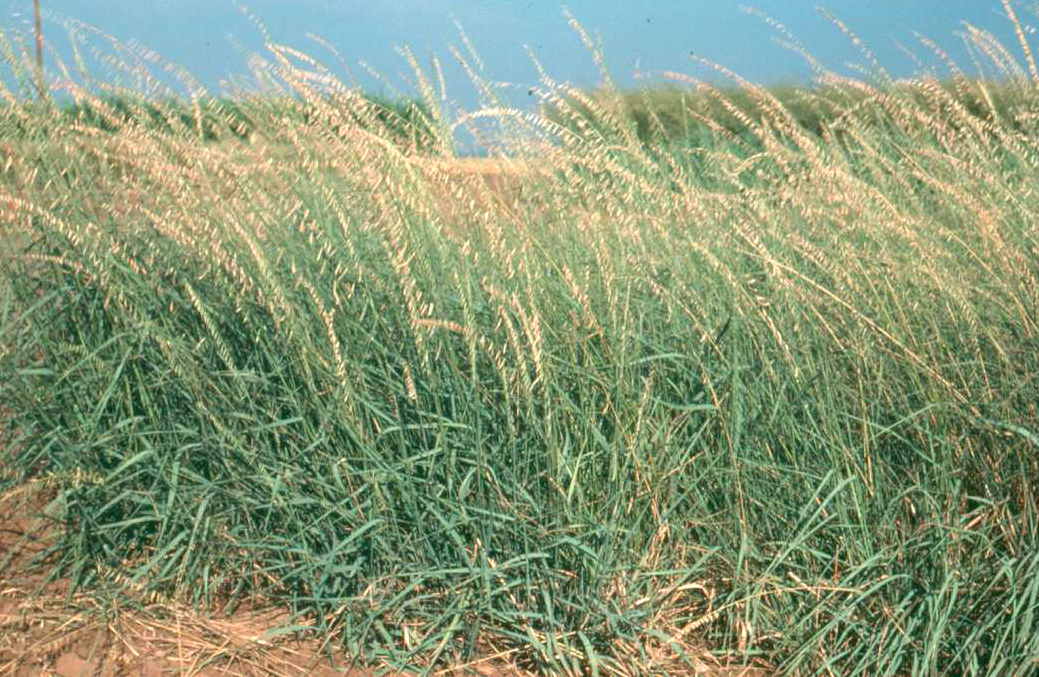
- Bouteloua curtipendula

Scientific classification
- Kingdom: Plantae
- Clade: Tracheophytes
- Clade: Angiosperms
- Clade: Monocots
- Clade: Commelinids
- Order: Poales
- Family: Poaceae
- Subfamily: Chloridoideae
- Tribe: Cynodonteae
- Subtribe: Boutelouinae; Stapf
- Genus: Bouteloua; Lag. 1805 not Hornem. ex P. Beauv. 1812

Type species
- Bouteloua racemosa Lag.

Synonyms
- List: Actinochloa Willd. ex Roem. & Schult., nom. superfl.; Antichloa Steud., name not validly published; Aristidium (Endl.) Lindl.; Atheropogon Muhl. ex Willd.; Botelua Lag., orth. var.; Buchloe Engelm.; Buchlomimus Reeder, C.Reeder & Rzed.; Bulbilis Raf.; Calanthera Hook.; Casiostega Galeotti; Cathestecum J.Presl; Chondrosum Desv.; Corethrum Vahl; Cyclostachya Reeder & C.Reeder; Erucaria Cerv., nom. illeg.; Eutriana Trin.; Fourniera Scribn., nom. illeg.; Griffithsochloa G.J.Pierce; Heterosteca Desv.; Lasiostega Benth., illegitimate homonym; Nestlera Steud., illegitimate homonym; Opizia J.Presl; Pentarrhaphis Kunth; Polyodon Kunth; Polyschistis J.Presl; Pringleochloa Scribn.; Soderstromia C.V.Morton; Strombodurus Steud., name not validly published; Triaena Kunth; Triathera Desv.

= Bouteloua =

Grama grass

Genus of grasses

Bouteloua is a genus of plants in the grass family Poaceae. Members of the genus are commonly known as grama grass.

== Description ==
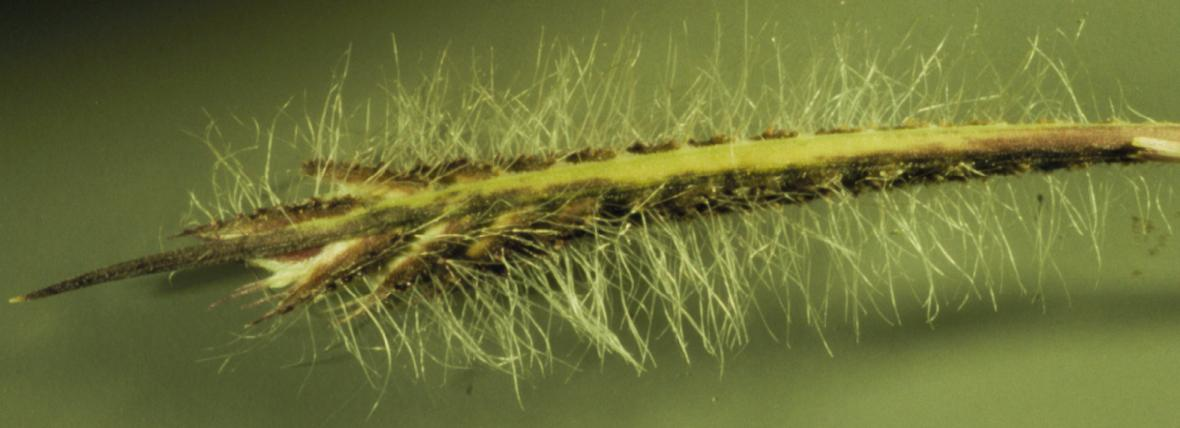
The top of a flower spike of Bouteloua hirsuta ([hairy grama), showing the flattened rachis

Bouteloua includes both annual and perennial grasses, which frequently form stolons. Species have an inflorescence of 1 to 80 racemes or spikes positioned alternately on the culm (stem). The rachis (stem) of the spike is flattened. The spikelets are positioned along one side of the spike. Each spikelet contains one fertile floret, and usually one sterile floret.

== Taxonomy ==
The genus was first described by Mariano Lagasca in 1805. It was named for Claudio and Esteban Boutelou, 19th-century Spanish botanists. David Griffiths produced a 1912 monograph on the genus.

=== Species ===
Species of Bouteloua include:

- Bouteloua alamosana Vasey – Mesoamerica
- Bouteloua americana (L.) Scribn. – American grama – southern Mexico, Central America, West Indies, northern South America
- Bouteloua annua Swallen – Baja California Sur, Sonora
- Bouteloua arizonica (M.E.Jones) Cuellar & Columbus
- Bouteloua aristidoides (Kunth) Griseb. – needle grama – United States (California, Arizona, Nevada, Utah, New Mexico, Texas); Mexico, South America, Aruba
- Bouteloua barbata Lag. – six-weeks grama – United States, Mexico
- Bouteloua bracteata (McVaugh) Columbus – Michoacán
- Bouteloua breviseta Vasey – United States, Mexico
- Bouteloua chasei Swallen
- Bouteloua chondrosioides (Kunth) Benth. ex S.Watson – sprucetop grama – United States (AZ TX); Mesoamerica
- Bouteloua curtipendula (Michx.) Torr. – sideoats grama – widespread in USA, Canada, Mexico
- Bouteloua dactyloides (Nutt.) Columbus – buffalograss – USA, Canada, Mexico
- Bouteloua dimorpha Columbus – Great Plains in USA, Canada, Mexico, Honduras, Cuba, Trinidad
- Bouteloua distans Swallen – Mexico
- Bouteloua disticha (Kunth) Benth. – from southern Mexico to Ecuador; also Cuba, Galápagos
- Bouteloua diversispicula Columbus
- Bouteloua elata Reeder & C.Reeder
- Bouteloua eludens Griffiths – USA (Arizona, New Mexico), Mexico (Chihuahua, Coahuila, Sonora)
- Bouteloua erecta (Vasey & Hack.) Columbus
- Bouteloua eriopoda (Torr.) Torr. – United States, Mexico
- Bouteloua eriostachya (Swallen) Reeder
- Bouteloua gracilis (Willd. ex Kunth) Lag. ex Griffiths – blue grama – Great Plains in USA, Canada, Mexico
- Bouteloua griffithsii Columbus
- Bouteloua herrera-arrietae P.M.Peterson & Romasch.
- Bouteloua hirsuta Lag. – USA (Great Plains, Southwest), Mexico, Guatemala
- Bouteloua johnstonii Swallen – Coahuila
- Bouteloua juncea (Desv. ex Beauv.) A.S.Hitchc. – lamilla – Cuba, Hispaniola, Puerto Rico
- Bouteloua karwinskyi (E.Fourn.) Griffiths
- Bouteloua kayi Warnock
- Bouteloua media (E.Fourn.) Gould & Kapadia – from central Mexico to Uruguay
- Bouteloua megapotamica (Spreng.) Kuntze – Argentina, Brazil, Uruguay, Bolivia
- Bouteloua mexicana (Scribn.) Columbus – Mexico, Belize, Guatemala, Honduras
- Bouteloua multifida (Griffiths) Columbus – from Sonora to Oaxaca
- Bouteloua nervata Swallen – Hidalgo, México State
- Bouteloua parryi (E. Fourn.) Griffiths – Parry's Grama, Texas, Arizona, New Mexico, Northern Mexico
- Bouteloua pectinata (Bouteloua hirsuta var. pectinata) – tall grama, eyebrow grass – Texas
- Bouteloua pedicellata Swallen – Puebla, Hidalgo, Guanajuato, Tlaxcala, Nuevo León, Veracruz
- Bouteloua polymorpha (E.Fourn.) Columbus – from Durango to Oaxaca
- Bouteloua purpurea Gould & Kapadia – Guanajuato, D.F., San Luis Potosí, México State, Hidalgo, Querétaro
- Bouteloua radicosa (E. Fourn.) Griffiths – purple grama – USA (Arizona, New Mexico), Mexico (Chihuahua, Michoacán, Coahuila, Morelos, Puebla, Durango, Zacatecas, Distrito Federal de México, Jalisco, Nuevo León, Hidalgo, Oaxaca, Tamaulipas)
- Bouteloua ramosa Scribn. ex Vasey
- Bouteloua reederorum Columbus – Durango, Puebla, Zacatecas, Oaxaca
- Bouteloua reflexa Swallen – Sonora, Sinaloa, Baja California, Baja California Sur, Nayarit
- Bouteloua repens (Kunth) Scribn. & Merr. – slender grama – Arizona, New Mexico, Texas, Oklahoma, Mesoamerica, Colombia, Venezuela, West Indies
- Bouteloua rigidiseta (Steud.) Hitchc. – Texas grama – New Mexico, Texas, Oklahoma, Arkansas, Louisiana, Mexico (Aguascalientes, Durango)
- Bouteloua scabra (Kunth) Columbus – from Hidalgo to Honduras
- Bouteloua scorpioides Lag.
- Bouteloua simplex Lag. Much of southwestern and central United States, Central America, western South America
- Bouteloua stolonifera Scribn. – San Luis Potosí, Aguascalientes, Zacatecas
- Bouteloua swallenii Columbus – from El Salvador to Venezuela
- Bouteloua triaena (Trin. ex Spreng.) Scribn. – from Sinaloa to Guatemala
- Bouteloua trifida Thunb. – Arizona, California, Nevada, New Mexico, Texas, Utah, Mexico
- Bouteloua uniflora Vasey – Nealley grama, oneflower grama – Utah, Texas, Coahuila, Zacatecas, Nuevo León, Querétaro, Oaxaca, San Luis Potosí, Tamaulipas
- Bouteloua vaneedenii Pilg. – Cuba, Leeward Islands, Venezuela
- Bouteloua varia (Swallen) Columbus
- Bouteloua warnockii Gould & Kapadia – Warnock's grama – New Mexico, Texas, Sonora, Chihuahua, Coahuila, Nuevo León, Tamaulipas, Zacatecas
- Bouteloua williamsii Swallen – Mexico, Guatemala, Honduras
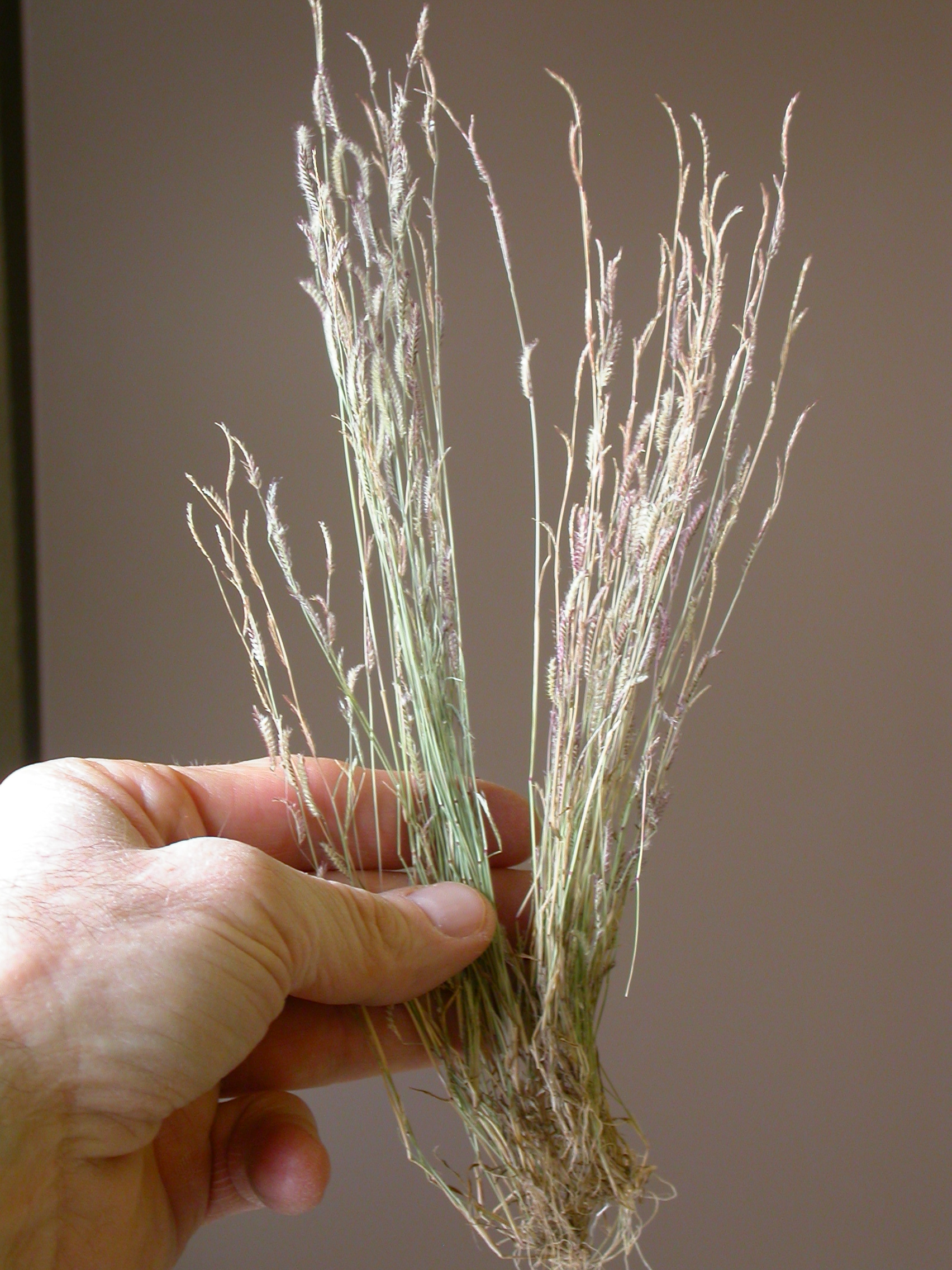
Bouteloua barbata (six-weeks grama)

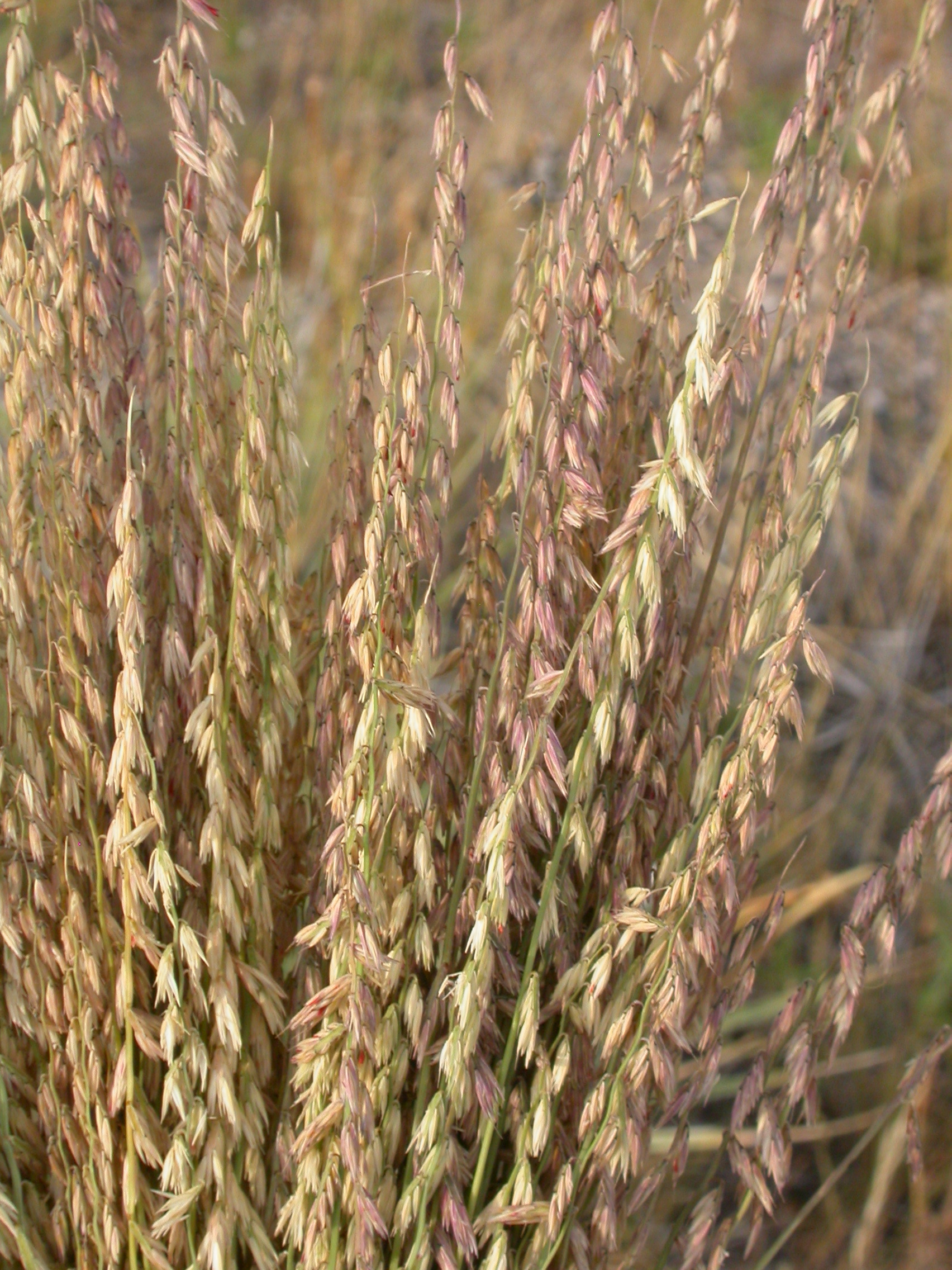
Bouteloua curtipendula (sideoats grama)

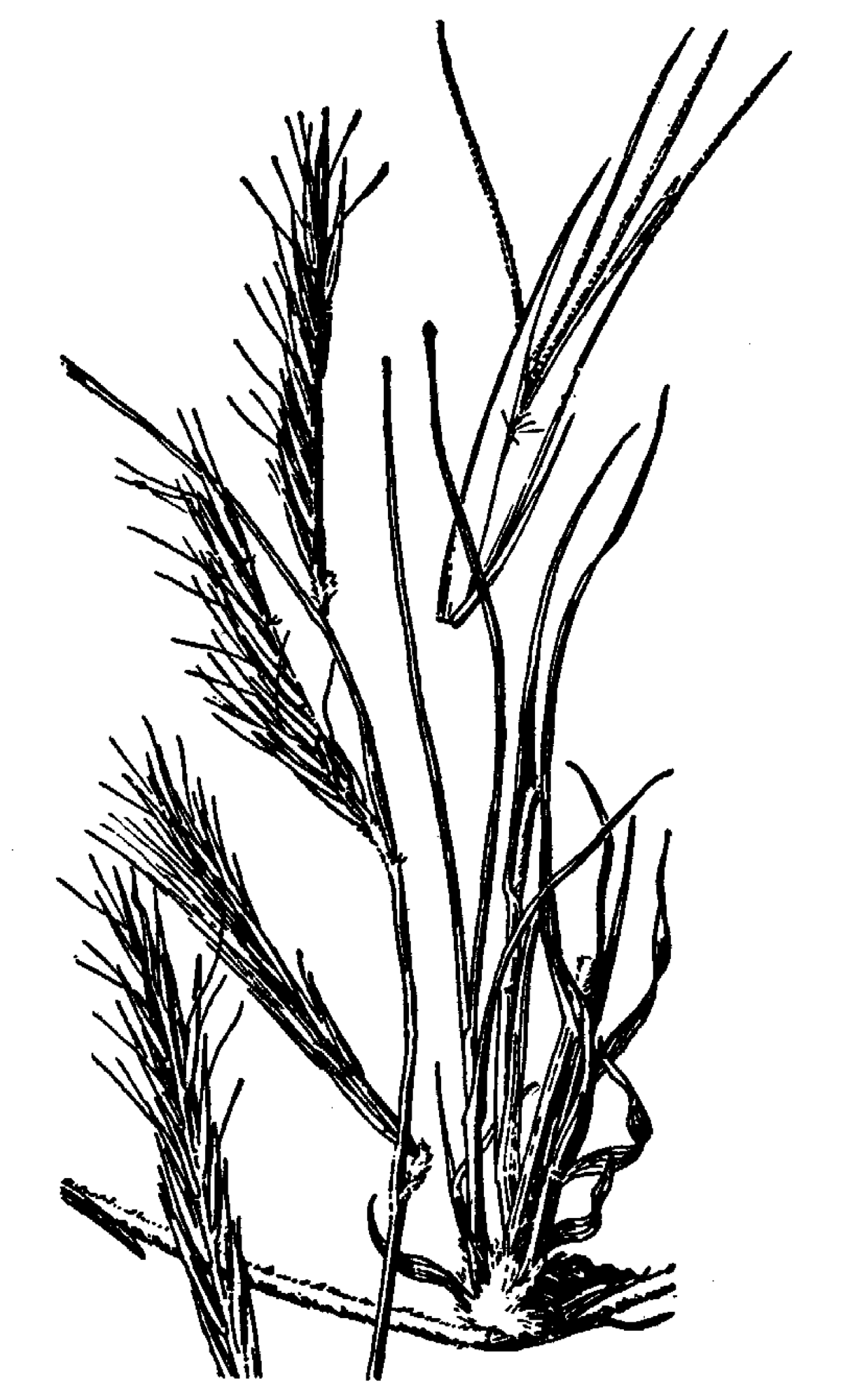
Bouteloua eriopoda (black grama)

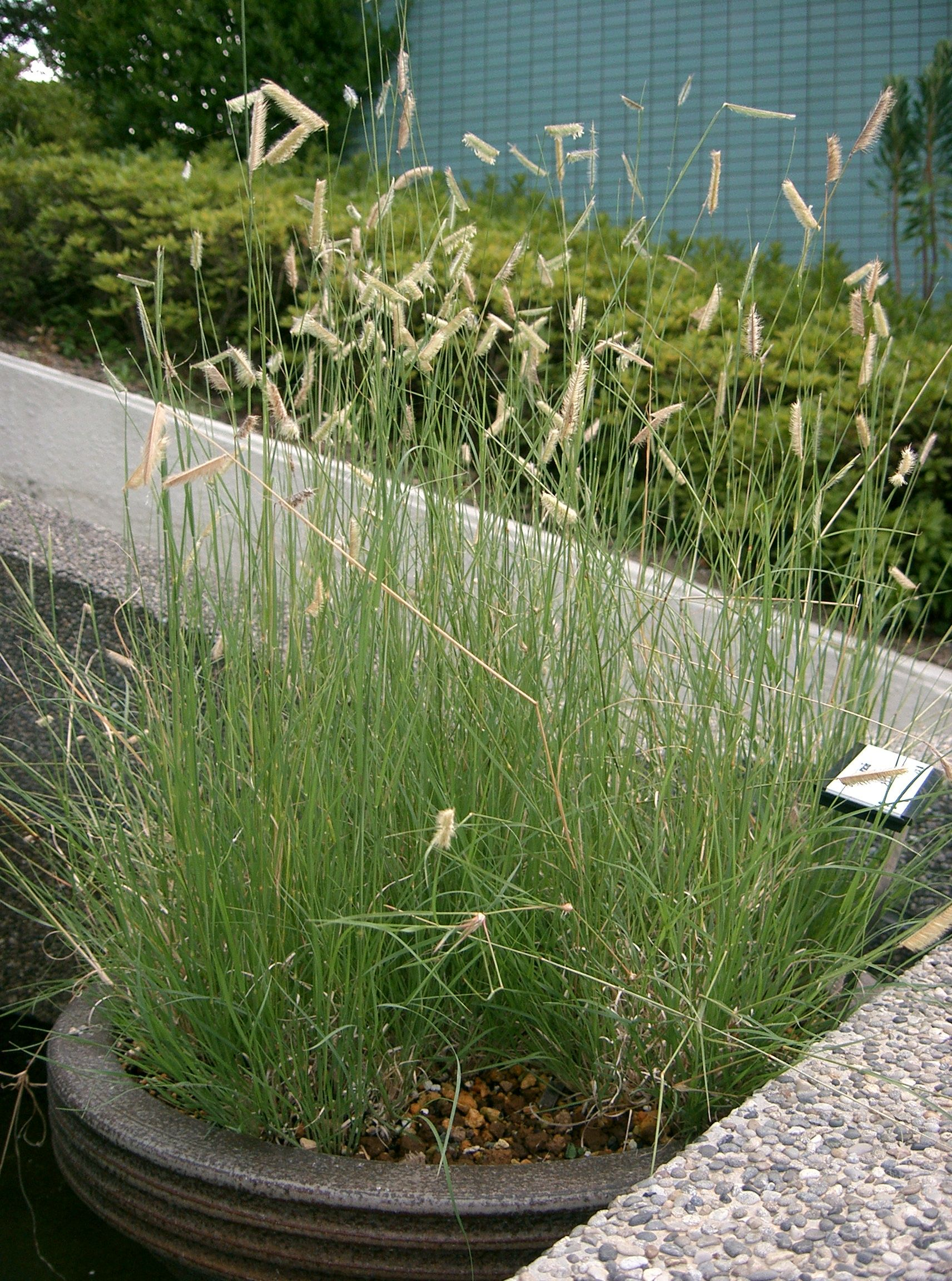
Bouteloua gracilis (blue grama)

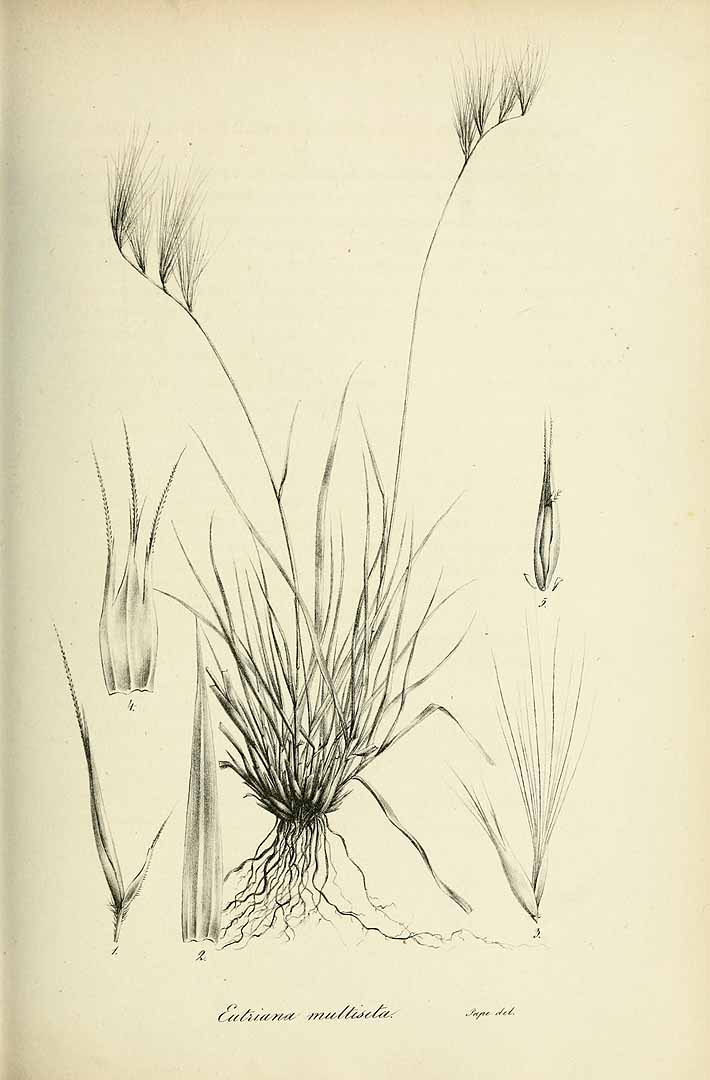
Bouteloua megapotamica

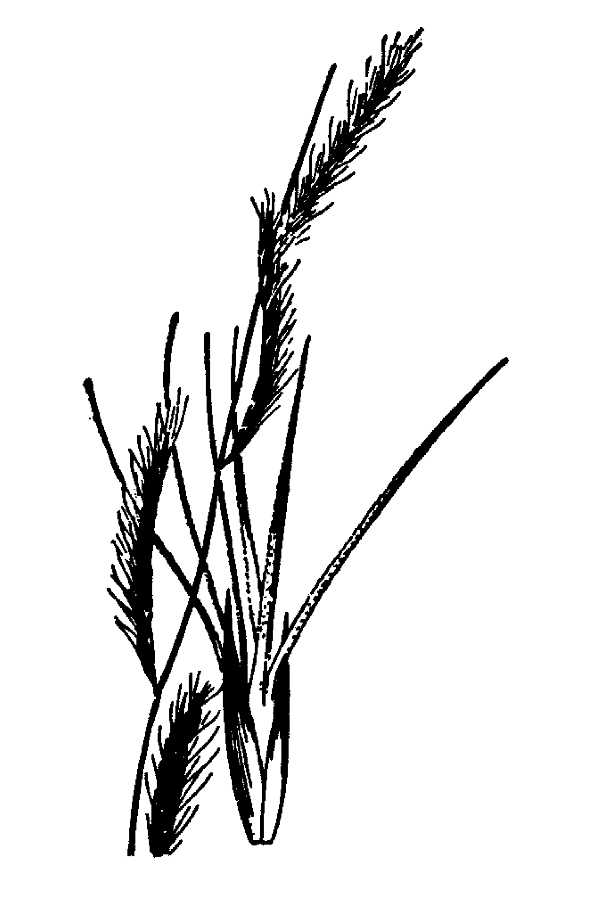
Bouteloua trifida (red grama)

== Distribution ==
Bouteloua is found only in the Americas, with most diversity centered in the southwestern United States. It also occurs in the Ciénaga de Zapata Biosphere Reserve of Cuba.

== Uses ==
Many species are important livestock forage, especially Bouteloua gracilis (blue grama).

== See also ==
- List of Poaceae genera
