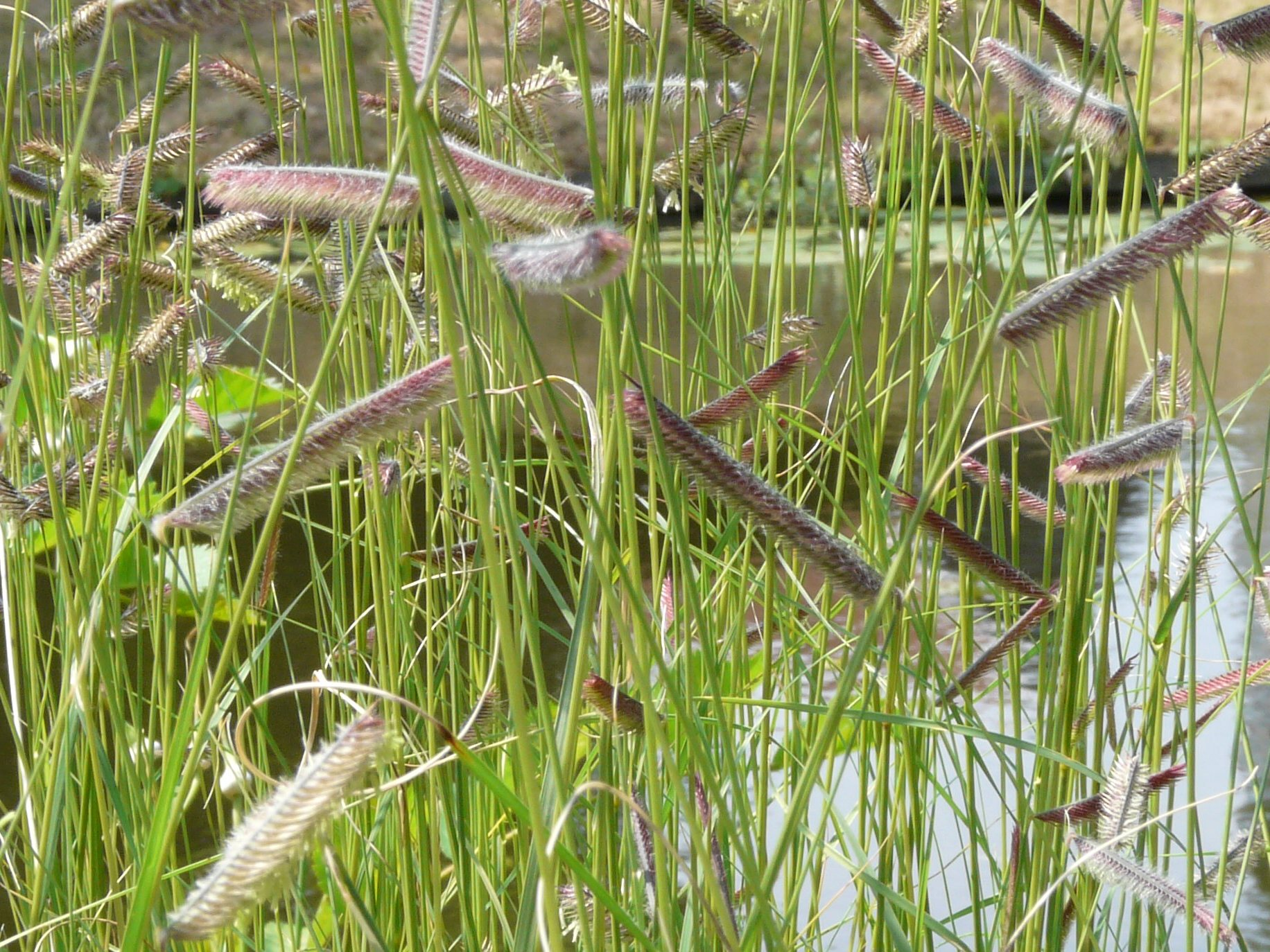

Scientific classification
- Kingdom: Plantae
- Clade: Tracheophytes
- Clade: Angiosperms
- Clade: Monocots
- Clade: Commelinids
- Order: Poales
- Family: Poaceae
- Subfamily: Chloridoideae
- Genus: Bouteloua
- Species: B. aristidoides

Binomial name
- Bouteloua aristidoides (Kunth) Griseb.

= Bouteloua aristidoides =

Species of grass

Bouteloua aristidoides, the needle grama, is an annual desert grass (Poaceae) found in California, Arizona, and western North America.
