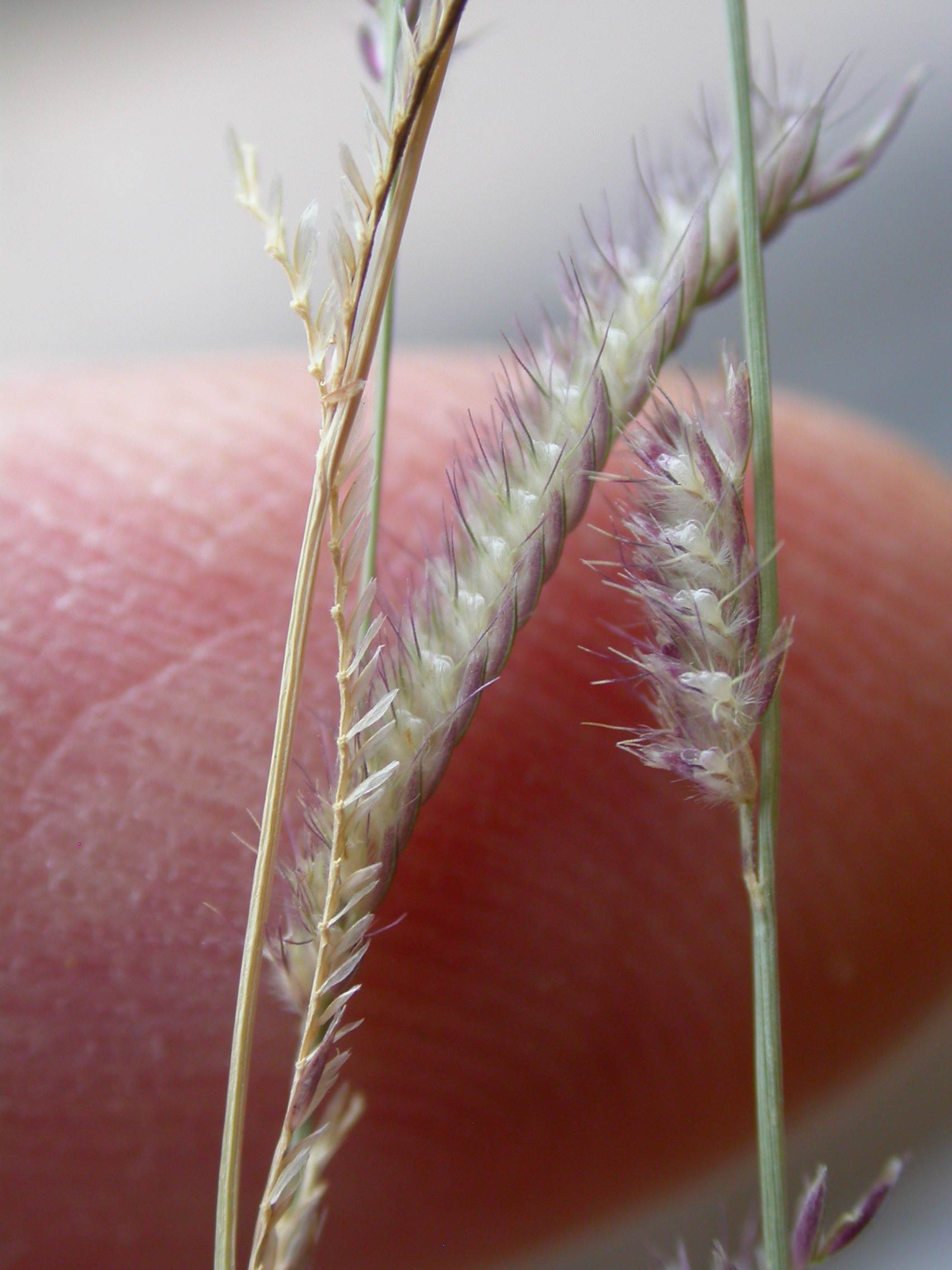

Conservation status
- Secure (NatureServe)

Scientific classification
- Kingdom: Plantae
- Clade: Tracheophytes
- Clade: Angiosperms
- Clade: Monocots
- Clade: Commelinids
- Order: Poales
- Family: Poaceae
- Subfamily: Chloridoideae
- Genus: Bouteloua
- Species: B. barbata

Binomial name
- Bouteloua barbata Lag.

= Bouteloua barbata =

Species of flowering plant

Bouteloua barbata is a species of grass known by the common name six-weeks grama native to North America.

== Distribution ==
It is native to North America, where it occurs in the southwestern United States and south to Oaxaca in southern Mexico. It may occur in Montana. It is also present in Argentina.

== Description ==
This species is an annual or perennial grass producing tufts of stems up to 30 to 75 cm (12 to 30 in) long, lying prostrate, spreading, or standing erect. The inflorescence has up to 11 branches, each a dense row of up to 40 spikelets. The fruit weighs about 0.03 milligrams. This lightweight seed is dispersed on the wind and by animals. It is annual or perennial, sprouting from seed or from its root crown after summer rainfall. Flowering usually begins around July and lasts until October. There are three varieties of this species. The var. barbata is an annual plant with decumbent stems that may root at stem nodes, var. rothrockii, sometimes considered a separate species, is perennial with erect stems, and var. sonorae, which is limited to northern Mexico, spreads via stolons.

== Ecology ==
Bouteloua barbata var. barbata grows in many types of habitat including prairie, grasslands, pinyon-juniper woodland, chaparral, creosote, shrubsteppe, savanna, and Ponderosa pine forest, while B. barbata var. rothrockii occurs primarily in subtropical grasslands and adjacent desertscrub, thornscrub, or riparian. The former grows in the deserts of the American southwest and Mexico, including the Colorado, Mojave, and Chihuahuan Deserts, and the latter is restricted to the Sonoran Desert. They can also be found in dry disturbed habitats such as roadsides, railroads, and overgrazed pastures.

While it is palatable, this grass is not considered a good forage for livestock, as it is a small plant and is green for a short time. Many types of other animals utilize it, however. Many birds, and small animals including prairie dogs and desert kangaroo rats eat the seeds of this and other grama grasses. Harvester ants in Arizona also eat the seeds of this species.
