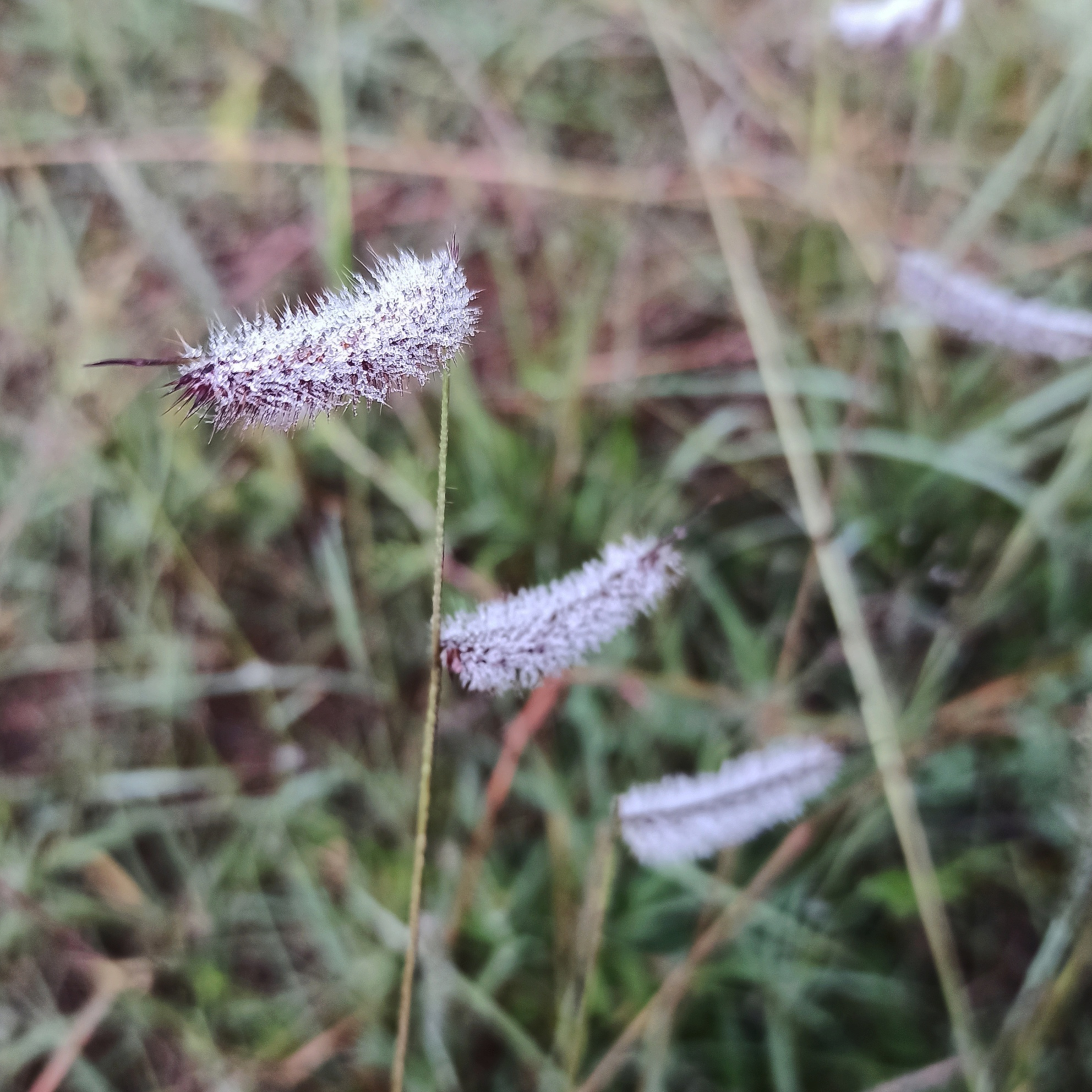

Scientific classification
- Kingdom: Plantae
- Clade: Tracheophytes
- Clade: Angiosperms
- Clade: Monocots
- Clade: Commelinids
- Order: Poales
- Family: Poaceae
- Subfamily: Chloridoideae
- Genus: Bouteloua
- Species: B. hirsuta

Binomial name
- Bouteloua hirsuta Lag.

= Bouteloua hirsuta =

Species of flowering plant

Bouteloua hirsuta, commonly known as hairy grama, is a perennial short prairie grass that is native throughout much of North America, including the Great Plains and Canadian Prairies region, as well as Mexico and Guatemala.

== Description ==
B. hirsuta is a warm-season grass growing 10–20 in (0.2-0.5 m tall, and grows well on mountainous plateaus, rocky slopes, and sandy plains. The leaf blade is flat or slightly rolled, narrow, mostly basal, with hairy margins. The leaf sheath is rounded, smooth, and shorter than internodes. The seedhead is one to four spikes, purplish before maturity, about 1 in (2.5 cm) long; the rachis extends beyond spikelets. It is used primarily for grazing.

== Distribution and habitat ==
Hairy grama prefers rocky slopes, as well as dry yet sandy areas between 4,000–6,500 ft (1,200–2,000 m).
