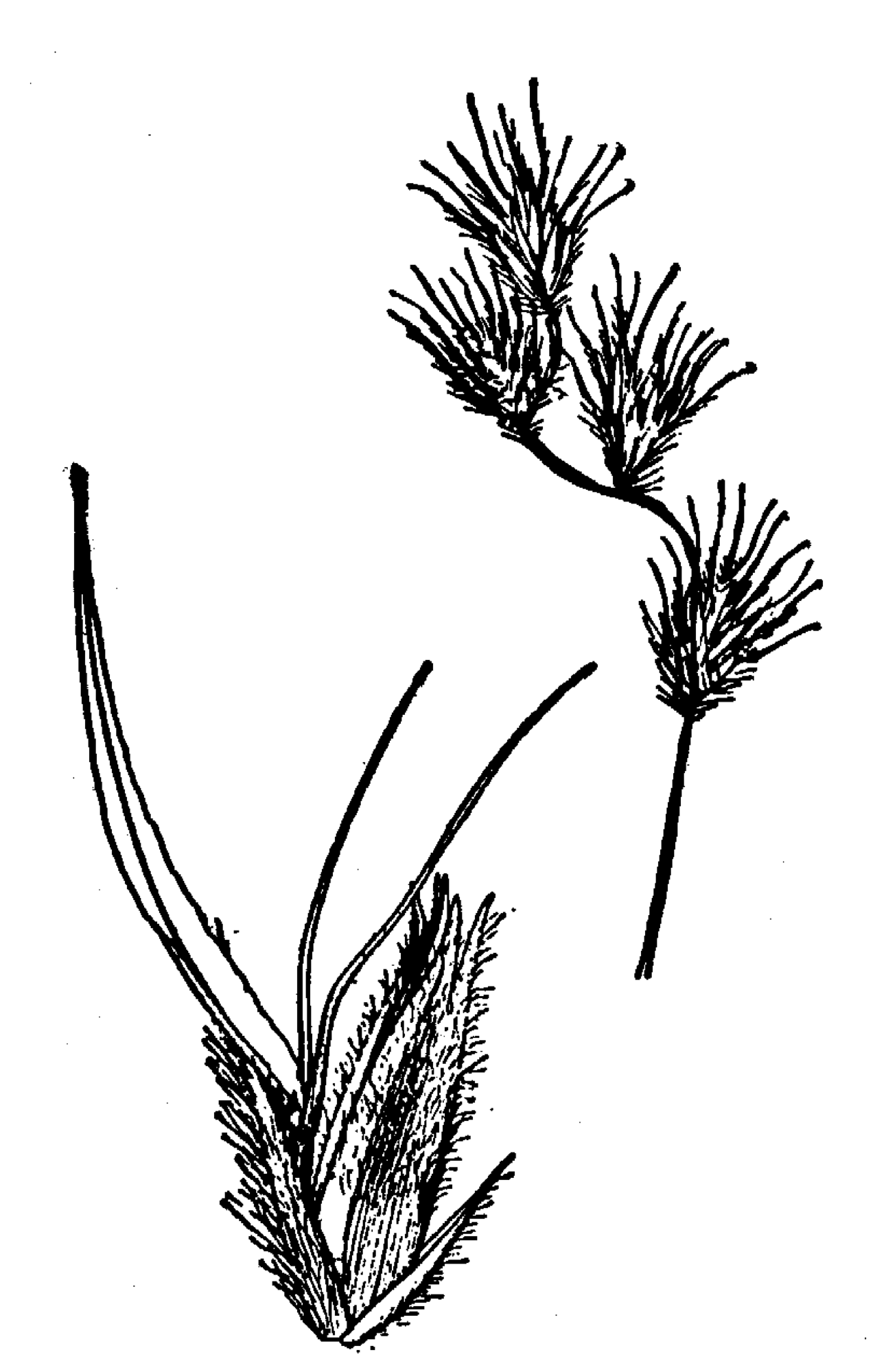
- A drawing of the grass, showing seed head and inflorescence

Scientific classification
- Kingdom: Plantae
- Clade: Tracheophytes
- Clade: Angiosperms
- Clade: Monocots
- Clade: Commelinids
- Order: Poales
- Family: Poaceae
- Subfamily: Chloridoideae
- Genus: Bouteloua
- Species: B. chondrosioides

Binomial name
- Bouteloua chondrosioides (Kunth) Benth. ex S. Watson

Synonyms
- Dinebra chondrosioides (Kunth); Chondrosum humboldtianum (Kunth)

= Bouteloua chondrosioides =

Perennial bunchgrass native to North America

Bouteloua chondrosioides, commonly known as sprucetop grama, is a perennial bunchgrass native to southern Arizona and northern Mexico.

== Description ==
Sprucetop grama is a small drought tolerant bunchgrass that grows to around 1 foot (0.30 m) tall in the wild. Under ideal conditions the plant can grow up to 3 feet (0.91 m) tall and exhibit turfgrass characteristics. Flowers are spikate, notable for their bright orange anthers, and are sent up in July through August. Seeds are set and spread September through October, although Sprucetop can also be propagated through rootstock. Flowers grow on racemes containing 3 to 7 spikes. Each spike bears between 7 and 13 perfect spikelets. Leaves are mostly basal with short sheathes and are mildly furrowed. Roots are strong and fibrous, but lack a central taproot.

== Distribution ==
Sprucetop grama is found chiefly in northern Mexico and in the desert foothills of southern Arizona. Field research showed that sprucetop preferred shallow slopes with acidic clay soils. Sprucetop was usually found growing among other drought tolerant prairie grasses, such as Bouteloua hirsuta and Hilaria belangeri. It represents an important forage crop for cattle grazing.
