= David Griffiths (botanist) =

American agronomist and botanist

David Griffiths (1867–1935) was an early 20th century American agronomist and botanist who was a specialist on fungi and on seed-producing plants, especially cacti.

== Biography ==
David Griffiths grew up in Dakota Territory after his family emigrated there from his birthplace of Aberystwyth, Wales. He attended South Dakota Agricultural College, receiving both a B.A. (1892) and an MSc (1893) from that institution. For a few years after leaving college, he taught high school science classes. In 1898, he began doctoral studies at Columbia University, focusing on fungi and publishing on such agriculturally important fungal diseases as powdery mildew, ergots, and smuts.

After gaining his Ph.D. degree in 1900, he became a professor of botany at the University of Arizona Experiment Station, where he studied desert plants. A year later, he moved to the Bureau of Plant Industry of the United States Department of Agriculture, where he would spend a decade and a half as a specialist on grasses in charge of field management of the Grass and Forage Plant Investigations unit of the bureau. For the bureau, he traveled around northern Mexico and the United States studying and collecting native grasses and range plants, ultimately assembling an enormous collection at the Plant Introduction Garden in Chico, California. In 1901 alone, he traveled over 700 miles between Nevada and Oregon, and he took some of the earliest known photos of the Great Basin that were intended specifically to record conditions out on the range. In this period, the fencing-in of the west over the previous half century had pushed sheep and cattle onto ever-smaller areas of rangeland, resulting in overstocking that had damaged the land. Griffiths' researches were part of a drive by the USDA to help find ways to improve range management in the western states.

In the course of his researches, Griffiths became especially interested in plants adapted to low-water environments such as prickly pear cactus that could be used as supplemental or emergency feed for livestock. As a result of his investigations into the cultivation potential of these kinds of food sources, he became an authority an cacti, assembling a collection of well over 3000 members of the cactus genus Opuntia. Under his supervision, the botanical illustrator Louis Charles Christopher Krieger painted a series of watercolors of his Opuntia collection. The year Griffiths died, his cactus collection (as well as his photographs of cacti) was donated to the United States National Museum.

In his final two decades, Griffiths focused on bulbous plants both native and imported, becoming a senior horticulturalist for USDA's research on bulb production. He authored a series of booklets on cultivation bulbs in general and of daffodils, narcissus, tulips, lilies, and hyacinths in particular.

== Honors ==
Griffiths was honored for his work on grasses by having an entire grass genus named after him, Griffithsochloa (now Bouteloua) . His name is also on the species Agropyron griffithsii (a synonym for Elymus albicans).

== Selected publications ==
The standard author abbreviation Griffiths is used to indicate this person as the author when citing a botanical name.

- Forage Conditions and Problems in Eastern Washington, Eastern Oregon, Northeastern California, and Northwestern Nevada (1902)
- Thornless Prickly Pears (1911)
- Native Pasture Grasses of the United States. USDA Bulletin no. 201. Coauthored with George Leslie Bidwell and Charles Edward Goodrich. (1915)
- Yields of Native Prickly Pear in Southern Texas. (1915)
- American Bulbs Under Glass. (1926)
- Bulbs from Seed. (1934)

Griffiths edited the exsiccata West American fungi (1901-1902).

The plant genus Wimmeria within the family Celastraceae is named after him.

== Sources ==
- Brummitt, R.K. & Powell, C.E. Authors Pl. Names (1992): 242.
- Ewan, J. 1950. Rocky Mountain Naturalists: 91.
- Taylor, W.A. 1935. "Obituary: David Griffiths", Science 81:2105, 426–427.
