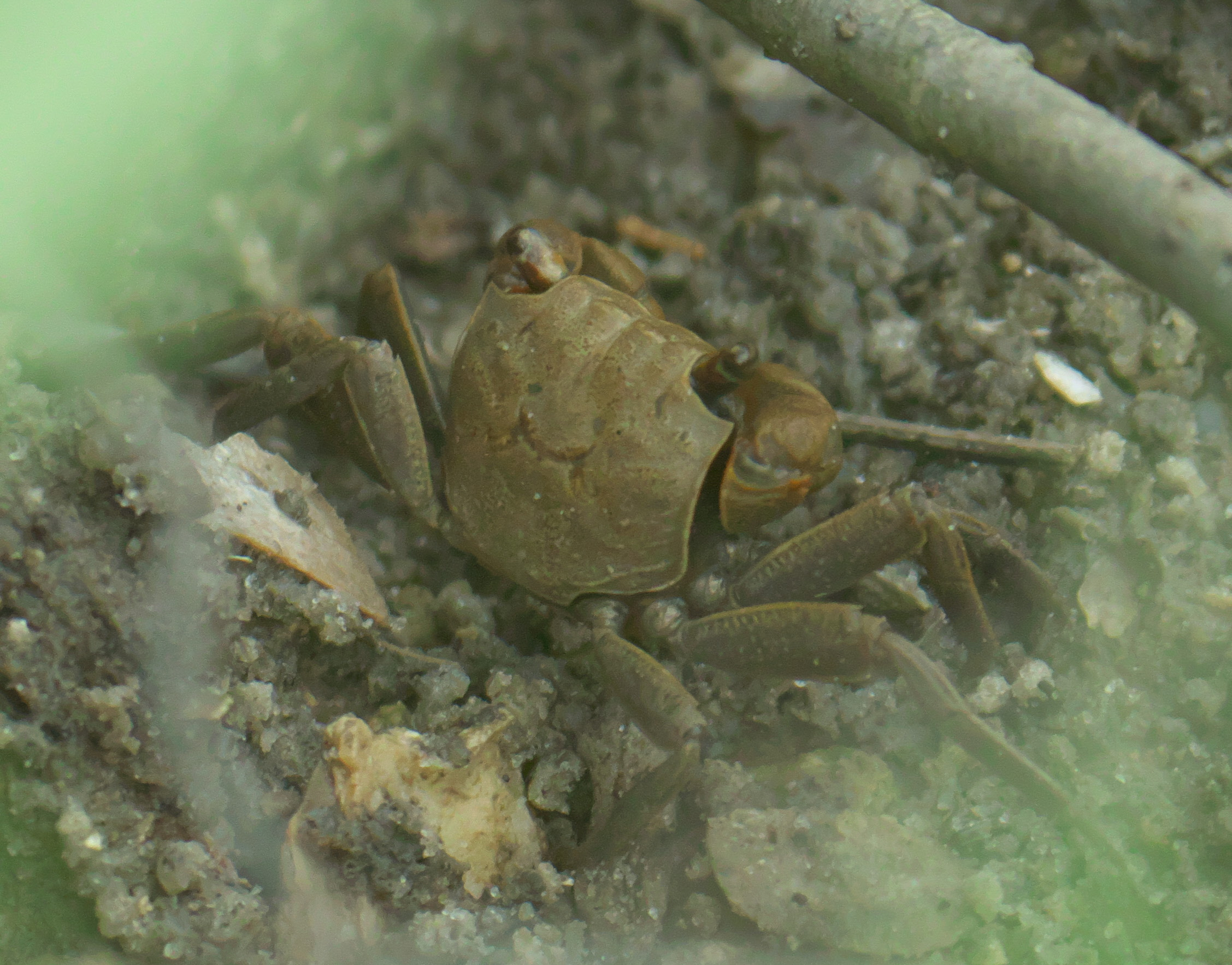

Scientific classification
- Kingdom: Animalia
- Phylum: Arthropoda
- Class: Malacostraca
- Order: Decapoda
- Suborder: Pleocyemata
- Infraorder: Brachyura
- Family: Sesarmidae
- Genus: Armases
- Species: A. cinereum

Binomial name
- Armases cinereum (Bosc, 1802)

= Armases cinereum =

Species of crab

Armases cinereum, also known as the squareback marsh crab or wharf crab, is a species of crab in the family Sesarmidae. The wharf crab is a small crab that is dark brown to muddy in color, which allows it to blend in with its usual surroundings. It is found on the Atlantic southeastern coast, down into the Gulf of Mexico. It is an omnivore and is prevalent in marshy coastal environments along the Southwestern Atlantic.

== Description ==
The genus Armases is defined by a primarily equatorial smooth carapace, which can be either slightly wider than long or vice versa. A distinct row of hair is present on the lower margin and second walking legs do not have any pubescence. Armases can be distinguished from members of other genera such as Sesarma or Sarmatium by the way its carapace has laterally parallel margins on each side of its body. This gives Armases cinereum its characteristic square shape and is the namesake for squareback marsh crab.

Armases cinereum, like most decapod crabs is vertically compressed with the majority of its body being composed of the carapace; the eyes are located at the top of eye stalks, the abdomen and thorax are positioned under the carapace, and there are four legs on each side of the carapace with one claw per side positioned anterior of the legs.Armases is a useful species for studying trophic dynamics in coastal habitats due to their high local abundance in both saltmarsh and mangrove habitats (with a distribution ranging in elevation from subtidal to supratidal), and wide-ranging mobility that spans the mangrove/upland ecotone

=== Sexual dimorphism ===
Sexual dimorphism is evident in the species, as males are typically slightly larger and have a more prominent palm. Its size ranges from 10.0 to 18.0 mm in length for mature males and 11.0 to 17.2 mm for mature females. Males have a subtriangular outline on their abdomen with a telson that is equal in width and length, while females have a subcircular outline on their abdomen with the telson being larger in width than length.

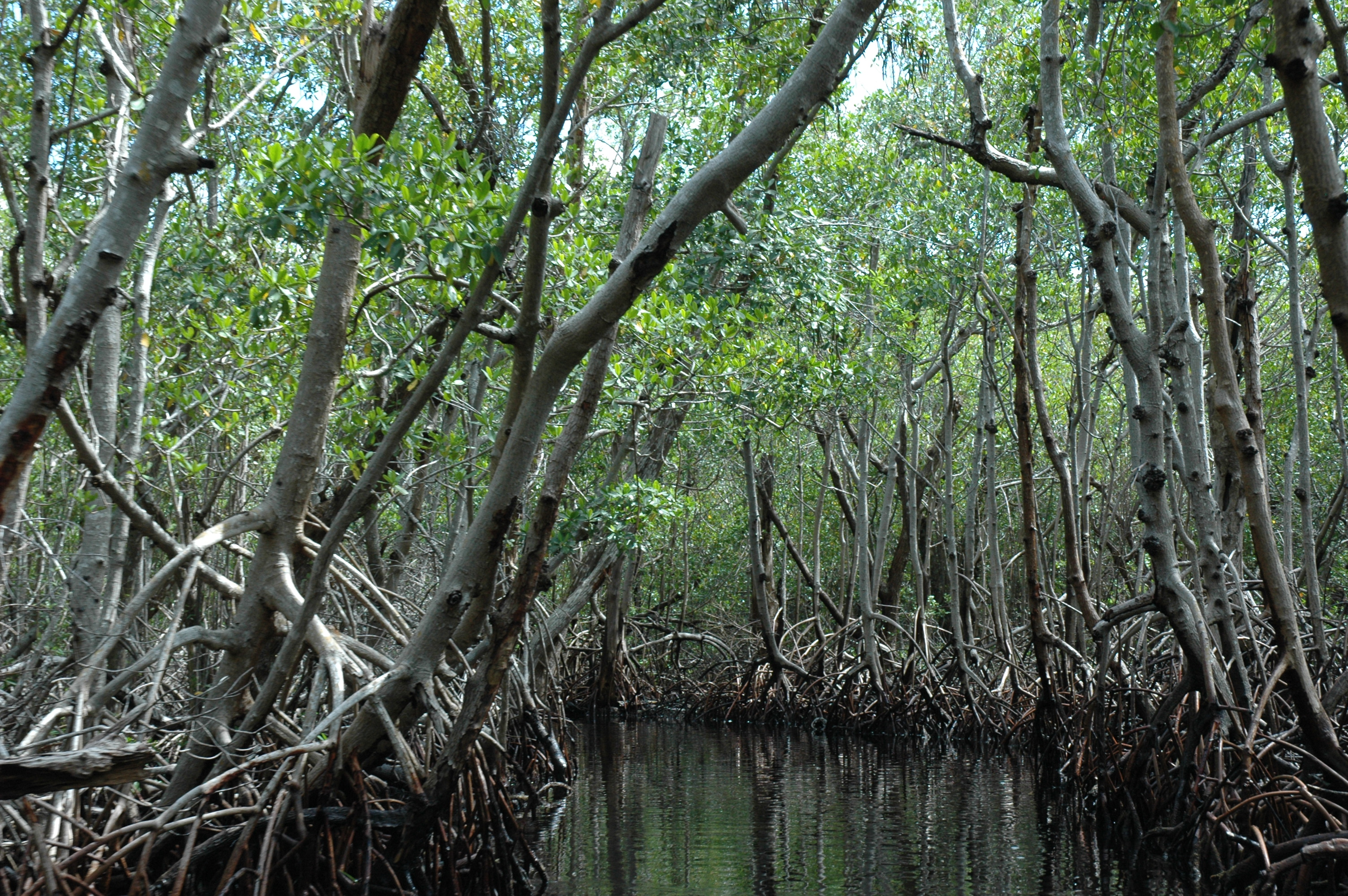
Mangrove Habitat

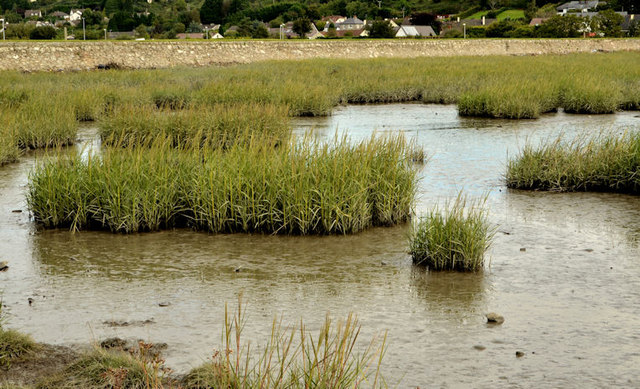
Salt Marsh Habitat

== Habitat and distribution ==
The wharf crab has a wide distribution in temperate to tropical coastal environments. The species has an abundantly high density in the coastal areas where it is found. Specimens can be found from the Chesapeake Bay area down and around coastal Florida, and west along the coast all the way to Veracruz, Mexico. The species is usually found in intertidal zones and can be found up to 50 m inland; they can thrive in a variety of habitats as well. These habitats commonly include Spartina (marsh grass) marshes and Rhizophora (mangrove) swamps. Within these habitats they prefer to live among and under rocks and debris brought in with the tides. Due to the high population density in coastal environments wharf crabs can be used as indicators of habitat conditions.

== Diet & ecology ==
While the wharf crab is often deemed a detritivore, it is highly omnivorous and will supplement a detritus diet with microscopic insects and invertebrates. In mangrove habitats wharf crabs are a key component as omnivores in the food chain, they serve as carnivores, herbivores, and detritivores. Some examples of what the wharf crab would eat in a Mangrove habitat include, insects, partially decomposed Avicennia (Black Mangrove), and leaves from Mangroves or other maritime vegetation. When feeding on plant matter wharf crabs will prioritize softer plants over plants with a tougher exterior. When both plant and animal food sources are readily available the wharf crab will choose the animal prey. The diet of Armases cinereum coincides directly with the environment in which it is found and what the prominent food availability is in that environment. Consequently, this diverse diet also allows the species to live at relatively high population densities across a large margin of coastal ecosystems.

== Taxonomy ==
Armases is a genus which is a part of the family Sesarmidae and the subfamily Sesarminae of Grapsidae. There are around 10 described genera within the subfamily Sesarminae. Armases cinereum is one of 11 described species in the genus Armases. The species cinereum was originally described by Louis Bosc in 1802, and was classified under the genus Sesarma. However, in 1992, the species was reclassified under the genus Armases by Lawrence Able.

== Reproduction and life stages ==
Crab reproduction occurs through a process known as spawning where eggs are released onto the abdomen of the female crab via the oviduct. The spawning season for Armases cinereum is typically between March and July. The species in the genus Armases are known as ovigerous, meaning they carry their eggs while they undergo embryonic development. Armases cinereum produce between 2,000 and 12,000 eggs in a brood. This number is dependent on fecundity which is proportional to the size of the female producing the eggs. Additionally fecundity represents the energy investment an individual must make to produce a brood of eggs. Eggs are energetically expensive to produce and being ovigerous in nature adds to the energy expenditure. When these eggs hatch larva called zoea emerge. Zoea are planktonic crab larvae with their trait characteristic being a large spine positioned dorsally. Crab zoea will grow and molt several times before they move into their next life stage called the megalopa stage. In this stage the eyes become positioned on eyestalks, a carapace is formed, and the abdomen becomes positioned outward from the carapace posteriorly. The next time the crab molts it will become a juvenile version of its adult form and its larval life stages will be complete.
