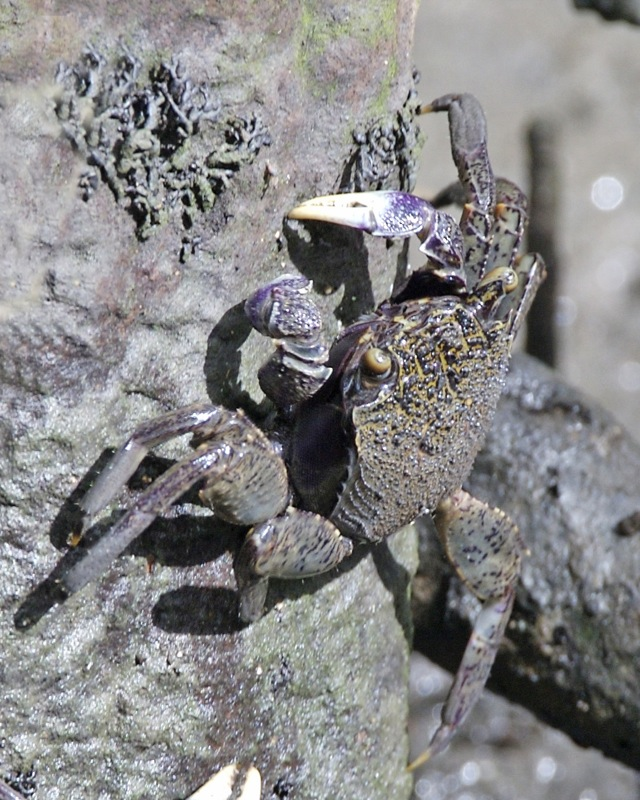

Scientific classification
- Kingdom: Animalia
- Phylum: Arthropoda
- Class: Malacostraca
- Order: Decapoda
- Suborder: Pleocyemata
- Infraorder: Brachyura
- Family: Sesarmidae
- Genus: Episesarma
- Species: E. versicolor

Binomial name
- Episesarma versicolor (Tweedie, 1940)

Synonyms
- Sesarma versicolor Tweedie, 1940

= Episesarma versicolor =

Violet vinegar crab

Species of crab

The violet vinegar crab (Episesarma versicolor) is a swimming crab species in the genus Episesarma. Distributed all over marine and brackish waters of Indo-West Pacific regions. It is harvested by many local fishermen for rich proteinaceous food.

== Distribution ==
A mangrove inhabitant, it is found all over Southeast Asian countries such as Southern China, Hong Kong, Indonesia, Malaysia, Philippines, Singapore, Thailand, northern Australia and South Asian countries like Bangladesh, India and Sri Lanka. They also seem to possess an estimate of around 40 bony spine-like structures called tubercles. These are more pronounced in males and these tubercles like in other crab species that have them seemingly represent stridulatory organs used to create sound.

== Description ==
The genus Episesarma comprises some of the largest sesarmid crabs. E. versicolor is distinguished by its white tipped violet chela (claw). Males grow up to a maximum length of 5 cm. The carapace is square-shaped and relatively flat, colored brown to brownish grey. The first gonopod of male E. versicolor has a narrower, shorter tip compared to other members of the genus. The dorsal portion of the dactylus possess 65-80 densely packed projections called tubercles These bony spine-like structures are more pronounced in males and, as seen in other crab species with tubercles, seem to be stridulatory organs for generating sound.

== Reproduction ==
Like most crabs they possess both male and female sexes. A ritual is generally performed utilizing both olfactory and tactile cues followed by an indirect sperm transfer.

== Habitat ==
This species is well distributed in mangrove regions, inhabiting burrows at tree bases or sometimes mounds created by Thalassina lobsters. Comparatively, mangroves have a high degree of biodiversity and provide a niche specific to the crab that decreases interspecific competition for food and other resources. E. versicolor favors the forest more than the Thalassina mound system in comparison to other species in the Episesarma genus.

== Behavior ==
=== Feeding ===
Episesarma versicolor are omnivorous, but feed primarily on calyx and leaves of water plants, mangroves, and mangrove associates. At Segara Anakan Lagoon, Java, Indonesia, E. versicolor feed on various food sources including detritus, bark, leaves, and on roots, algae and animal matter to a lesser extent. Their diet adapts to the environment, which helps them survive when food sources are scarce or changing. When food is abundant, such as during a feeding experiment, they prefer leaves with a high amount of nitrogen compounds. They have been observed cutting leaf litter and bringing some fragments back to their burrows. To remove leaves from trees, they tear off a section of the leaf with their claws and feed on those small sections they tear off. Leaves with previous damage from other herbivorous organisms are targeted by the crabs for feeding, utilizing previous holes to tear off sections more easily.

=== Migration ===
E. versicolor burrow when the tide is low in day time, unless heavy rainfall forces them out of the burrows. When the tide is high, the larger crabs climb up trees, while smaller crabs stay burrowed. They can climb as high as 6m up. The crabs do not feed while they stay up on the trees, which indicates that they migrate to avoid predators during high tide. Predators such as fish and hard-shelled crabs can enter the larger burrows of E. versicolor, which forces larger individuals to climb up trees. However, while on the trees, E.versicolor are vulnerable to terrestrial predators and avoid detection by staying motionless on the tree trunks.

=== Communication ===
Episesarma versicolor utilize three different sounds when communicating and competing with each other in the form of rapping, vibrating and leg stamping. Each form communicates a different message. Rapping is the action of repeatedly hitting their claws against the substrate. It is generally observed in displays of territory defense against other individuals. Leg stamping is when the leg repeatedly strikes against the substrate. Leg stamping has been observed when used to show dominance for mates or territory, even when the E. versicolor are fighting it is observed that they will still utilize leg stamping in their fights. Vibrating is the action of E. versicolor raising one of their legs and vibrating it in the air rapidly. This behavior is utilized by E. versicolor after competition between species resembling a victory dance against competition.

== Commercial fisheries ==
E. versicolor is an important part of commercial fisheries in Southeast Asia. They are harvested by hand and often pickled in vinegar and/or salt solutions to be eaten with rice or deep fried. Due to their popularity in Thailand, they are being overfished. 18,000 tons of sesarmid crabs like E. versicolor are harvested from mangrove habitats and are consumed by Thai people. 12,000 tons of crab harvested annually from the Thai mangroves cannot keep up with domestic demand. Hence, Thailand imports at least 6000 tons of sesarmid crabs from the neighboring countries of Myanmar and Cambodia.
