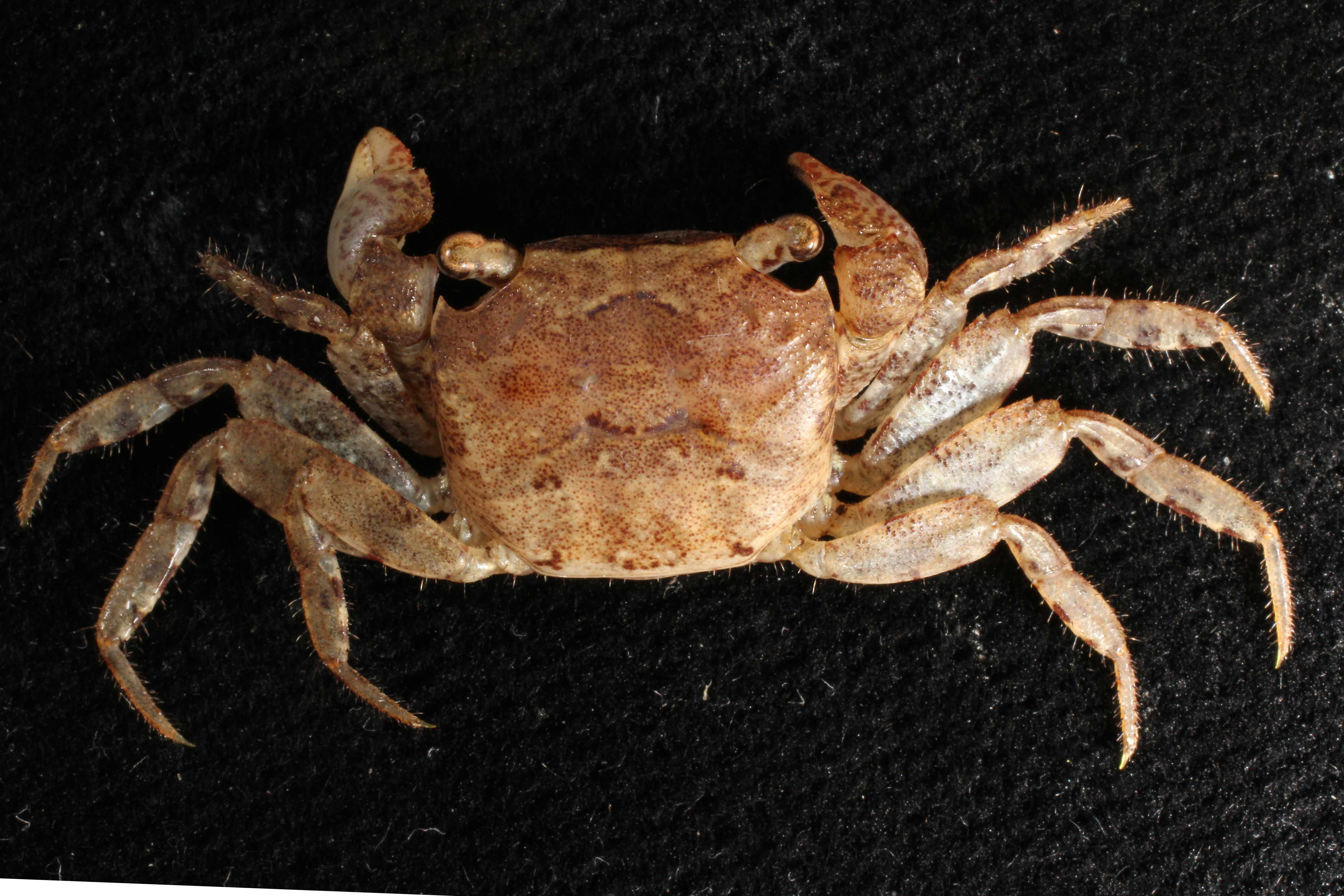
- A preserved specimen of M. obesum

Scientific classification
- Domain: Eukaryota
- Kingdom: Animalia
- Phylum: Arthropoda
- Class: Malacostraca
- Order: Decapoda
- Suborder: Pleocyemata
- Infraorder: Brachyura
- Family: Sesarmidae
- Genus: Metasesarma
- Species: M. obesum

Binomial name
- Metasesarma obesum (Dana, 1851)

Synonyms
- Sesarma obesum Dana, 1851; Holometopus obesus (Dana, 1851); Metasesarma granularis Heller, 1862; Metasesarma rousseauxi H. Milne Edwards, 1853; Sesarma rousseauxi (H. Milne Edwards, 1853)

= Metasesarma obesum =

Species of crab

Metasesarma obesum, also known as the marble crab or marble Batik crab, is a species of sesarmid crab. It is a semiterrestrial and brackish-water crab that lives on sandy beaches.

== Distribution ==
Metasesarma obesum is known from the shores of the Indian and Pacific Oceans.

== Description ==
The neotype is a male measuring 14.3 mm × 13.5 mm (0.6 in × 0.5 in).

== In aquaria ==
They are occasionally found in the aquarium trade. They require land area, hiding places such as leaf litter or driftwood, and shallow brackish/salt water. It is omnivorous and generally peaceful to tankmates and conspecifics, however it might fight with conspecifics if it does not have enough space.
