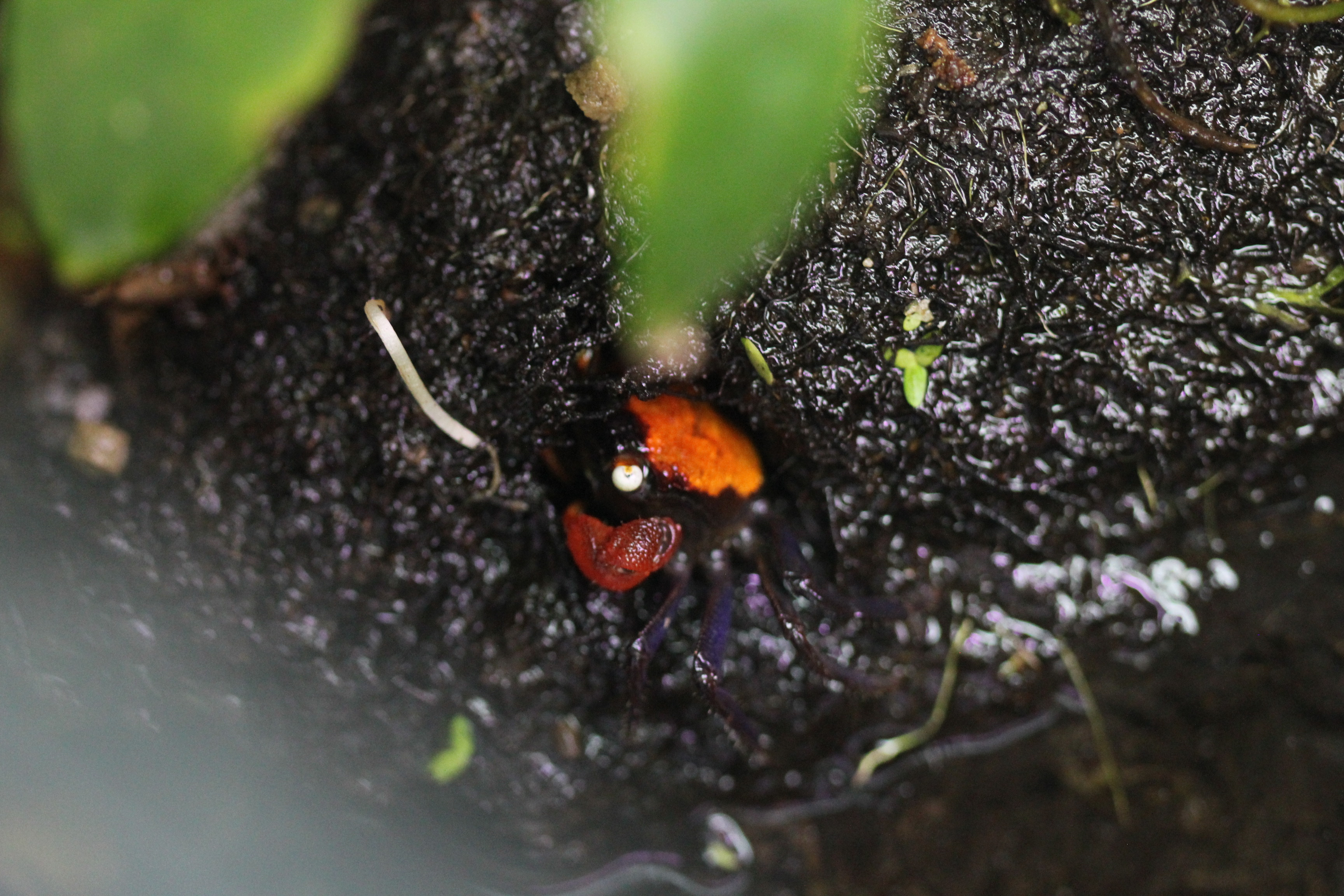

Scientific classification
- Kingdom: Animalia
- Phylum: Arthropoda
- Class: Malacostraca
- Order: Decapoda
- Suborder: Pleocyemata
- Infraorder: Brachyura
- Family: Sesarmidae
- Genus: Geosesarma
- Species: G. hagen

Binomial name
- Geosesarma hagen Ng, Schubart & Lukhaup, 2015

= Geosesarma hagen =

Species of crab

Geosesarma hagen is a species of small land-living crabs found on Java, Indonesia. The species is dark brown with the chelae and parts of the carapace being bright orange on the adults.

It is popular in the aquarium trade, where it is sometimes called "Geosesarma red devil" or "Geosesarma sp "rot" (rot means "red" in German).

The species is named after the Rolf C. Hagen Group, which supported work by Christian Lukhaup and Christoph D. Schubart, two of the authors of the describing article.

== Environment ==
Geosesarma hagen is a species of small land-living crabs only found in Java, Indonesia. G. hagen prefers a humid environment with elements from both terrestrial and freshwater aquatic habitats. It steers clear of drier land and although the younger crabs tend to live in closer proximity to the water, they are not aquatic crabs. Young G. hagen spend most of their time in the water as a way to avoid predators.

This species lives in warm, humid conditions and its preferred temperature ranges from 24 to 28 °C (75 to 82 °F).

== Morphology ==
It can reach up to 7 cm (2.8 in) in length counting the full leg span. Amongst its distinguishing features, G. hagen has a wider, square shape body, dark brown anterior carapace and legs, while the posterior of the carapace and the claws/chelae are instead orange/red. It has bright yellow eyes and its abdomen is usually gray.

== Reproduction and life cycle ==
Geosesarma hagen can live up to 2 years, but averages about 1.5 years. It undergoes molting in order to grow and recover lost legs and limbs within a few months of losing them. It can go through several molts during its lifetime.

Geosesarma hagen is sexually dimorphic and males have a narrow and slimmer plate while females have a broad plate on their belly and they might also be carrying around some fertilized eggs. Another difference between male and female crabs is in their claws: males have larger and brighter claws while females have smaller claws.

Mating occurs when the female is ready to mate and it lasts for several minutes. The females release their eggs in freshwater and each female can carry about 12-24 eggs. Incubation lasts around 30–50 days and the larval stage is completely absent. The hatched crab develops directly and they lack coloration when they are young (they become dark brown and then eventually develop bright adult coloration).

== Behavior ==
Geosesarma hagen is cathemeral and spends most of its life hidden from the light in order to avoid predation. At night, it is an active hunter and scavenger. It will engage in fights over territory, especially males. Like many crabs, G. hagen shows higher social and behavioral complexity than other invertebrates. It is, however, often aggressive with crabs of other species, including other Geosesarma species.

It often creates its shelters by digging up small amounts of dirt near bodies of water. Though it is not generally thought of as a true burrower, it spends most of its time hidden in these dens.

== Ecology ==
Geosesarma hagen is an omnivore, though it shows a preference for animal prey, and its diet ranges from small detritus and dead plants to fruit flies, woodlice and other bugs.

It also is a key animal in the microbial loop in the tropics as well as a key player for biogeochemical nutrient cycling.

== Relationship with humans ==
It is popular in the aquarium trade, where it is sometimes called "Geosesarma red devil" or "Geosesarma sp "rot" (rot means "red" in German).

The crab is not known to pose any danger to humans, though its bright coloration may suggest otherwise at first glance.
