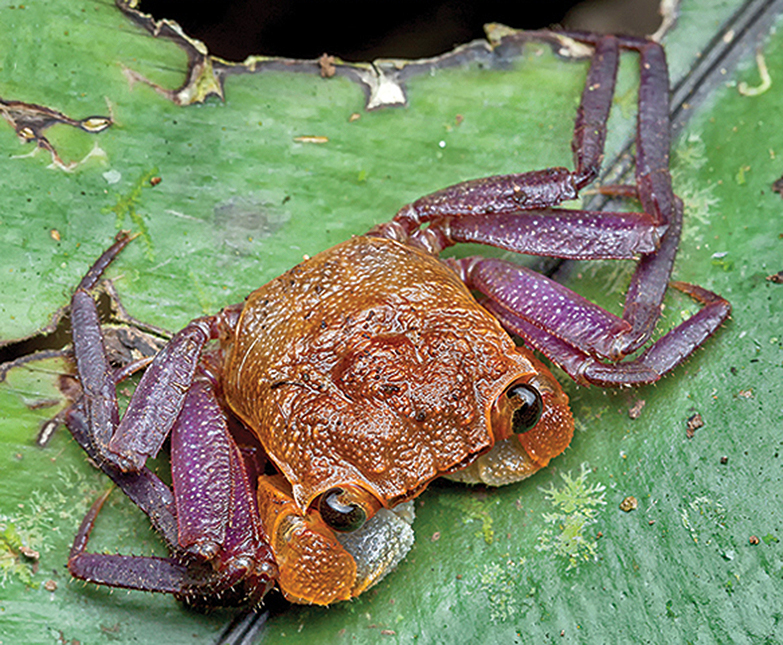

Scientific classification
- Kingdom: Animalia
- Phylum: Arthropoda
- Class: Malacostraca
- Order: Decapoda
- Suborder: Pleocyemata
- Infraorder: Brachyura
- Family: Sesarmidae
- Genus: Geosesarma
- Species: G. sabanum

Binomial name
- Geosesarma sabanum Ng, 1992

= Geosesarma sabanum =

Species of crab

Geosesarma sabanum is a species of crab found in eastern Sabah.
