= Geosesarma lawrencei =

Scientific classification
- Kingdom: Animalia
- Phylum: Arthropoda
- Class: Malacostraca
- Order: Decapoda
- Suborder: Pleocyemata
- Infraorder: Brachyura
- Family: Sesarmidae
- Genus: Geosesarma
- Species: G. lawrencei

Binomial name
- Geosesarma lawrencei Manuel-Santos & Yeo, 2007

Species of crab

Geosearma lawrencei is a species of crab that lives in Palawan, Philippines.
