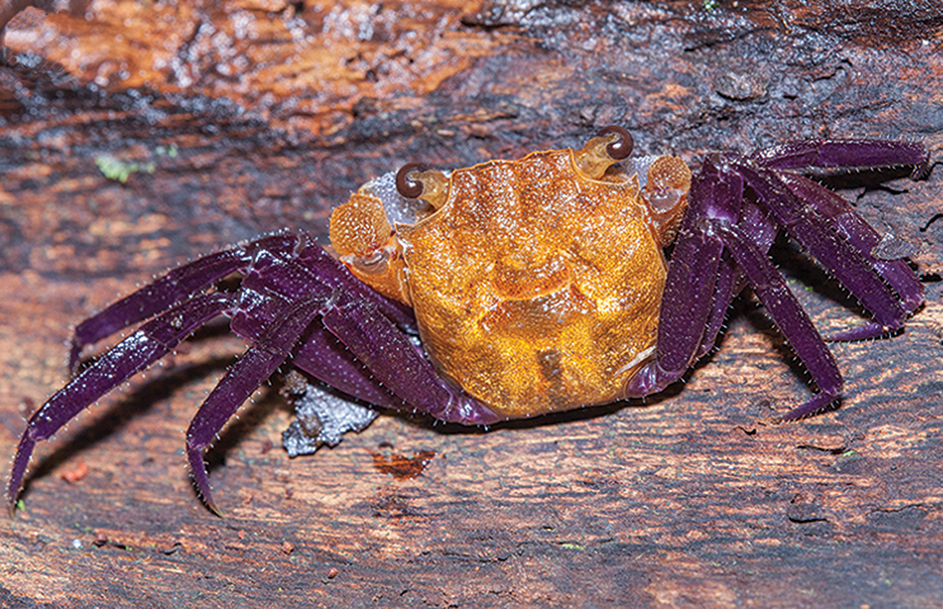
- Geosesarma danumense male

Scientific classification
- Kingdom: Animalia
- Phylum: Arthropoda
- Class: Malacostraca
- Order: Decapoda
- Suborder: Pleocyemata
- Infraorder: Brachyura
- Family: Sesarmidae
- Genus: Geosesarma
- Species: G. danumense

Binomial name
- Geosesarma danumense Ng, 2002

= Geosesarma danumense =

Species of crab

Geosesarma danumense is a species of crab found in from Sabah, Malaysia.
