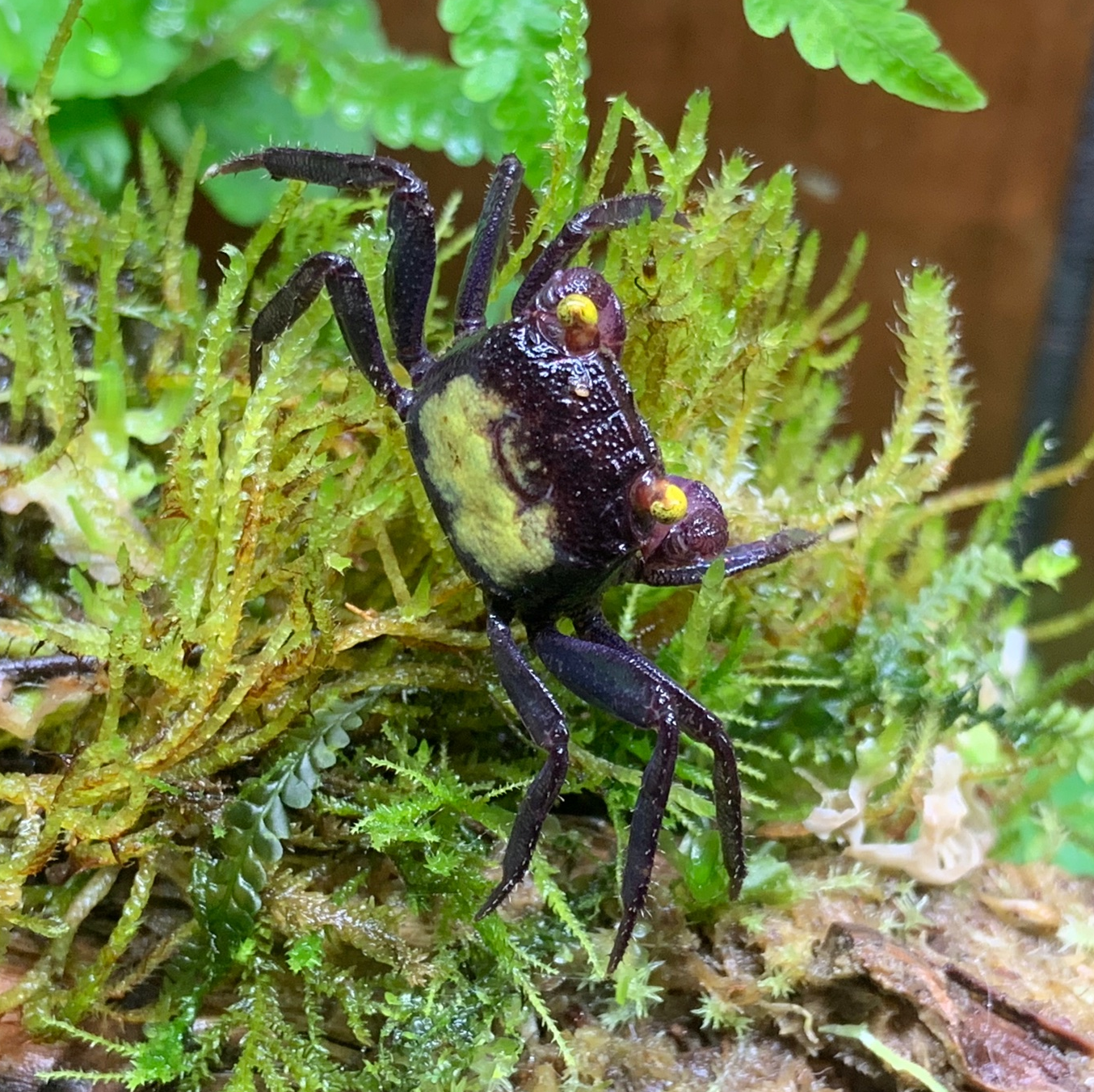

Scientific classification
- Kingdom: Animalia
- Phylum: Arthropoda
- Clade: Pancrustacea
- Class: Malacostraca
- Order: Decapoda
- Suborder: Pleocyemata
- Infraorder: Brachyura
- Family: Sesarmidae
- Genus: Geosesarma
- Species: G. dennerle

Binomial name
- Geosesarma dennerle Ng, Schubart & Lukhaup, 2015

= Geosesarma dennerle =

Species of crab

Geosesarma dennerle is a species of small terrestrial crab found in Java, Indonesia. It is popular in the aquarium trade, where G. dennerle is one of the species referred to as the vampire crab. The species is named after the aquarium supply company Dennerle, which supported one of the describing authors' studies in Java. The coloration of G. dennerle can be very similar to G. bicolor. Ng et al. states chelipeds, male abdominal and first gonopodal structures as distinguishing features.

== Description ==
Geosesarma dennerle is a member of the phylum Arthropoda, and subphylum Crustacea. This species resides in the genus Geosesarma De Man, 1892, which comprises 67 recognized species, commonly found in Southeast Asia. These crabs are generally from 1.5 to 2 inches (38 to 51 mm) in size. The crab features a two-colored carapace, being predominantly purple with a patch of cream/yellow on its back. G. dennerle also possesses bright yellow eyes and vibrant violet claws.

As a member of the order Decapoda, this crab has five pairs of segmented limbs. Unlike some species of crab that have specialized claws, G. dennerle does not have swollen chelae. The carapace is described as square-esque in shape, with well defined regions of the shell, and the abdomen being broad. The ambulatory legs of this crab are generally long and thin, with broad segments. G. dennerle often have tubercles along their dorsal carapace, providing some texture to the otherwise smooth shell.

G. dennerle are similar to other species of crabs that exhibit sexual dimorphism. The sex of Geosesarma species can be identified by observation of the abdominal flaps. Males have narrow and pointed abdominal flaps, while females possess wider flaps which are ovular in shape. Males are also slightly larger than females.

== Ecology ==
G. dennerle is endemic to Central Java.

As the prefix "geo-" suggests, G. dennerle is a terrestrial crab. It is common to find G. dennerle hiding in burrows in areas composed of muddy creek valleys, with rocks and dense vegetation. The diet of G. dennerle is greatly composed of insects and plant matter. The high endemism of species within the Geosesarma genus means it has a very limited geographic distribution.

== Reproduction ==
Members of the Geosesarma genus commonly produce large eggs, averaging between 1.2 and 1.8 mm in diameter. Members of Geosesarma become sexually mature around six months of age, with breeding consisting of the male mounting the female to fertilize eggs. This species has direct development of offspring: fully formed miniature versions of the adults hatch from the eggs. The female will carry around 20–80 fertilized eggs for about a month before hatching occurs. These newly hatched offspring are often independent, and will disperse from the point where they hatch.
