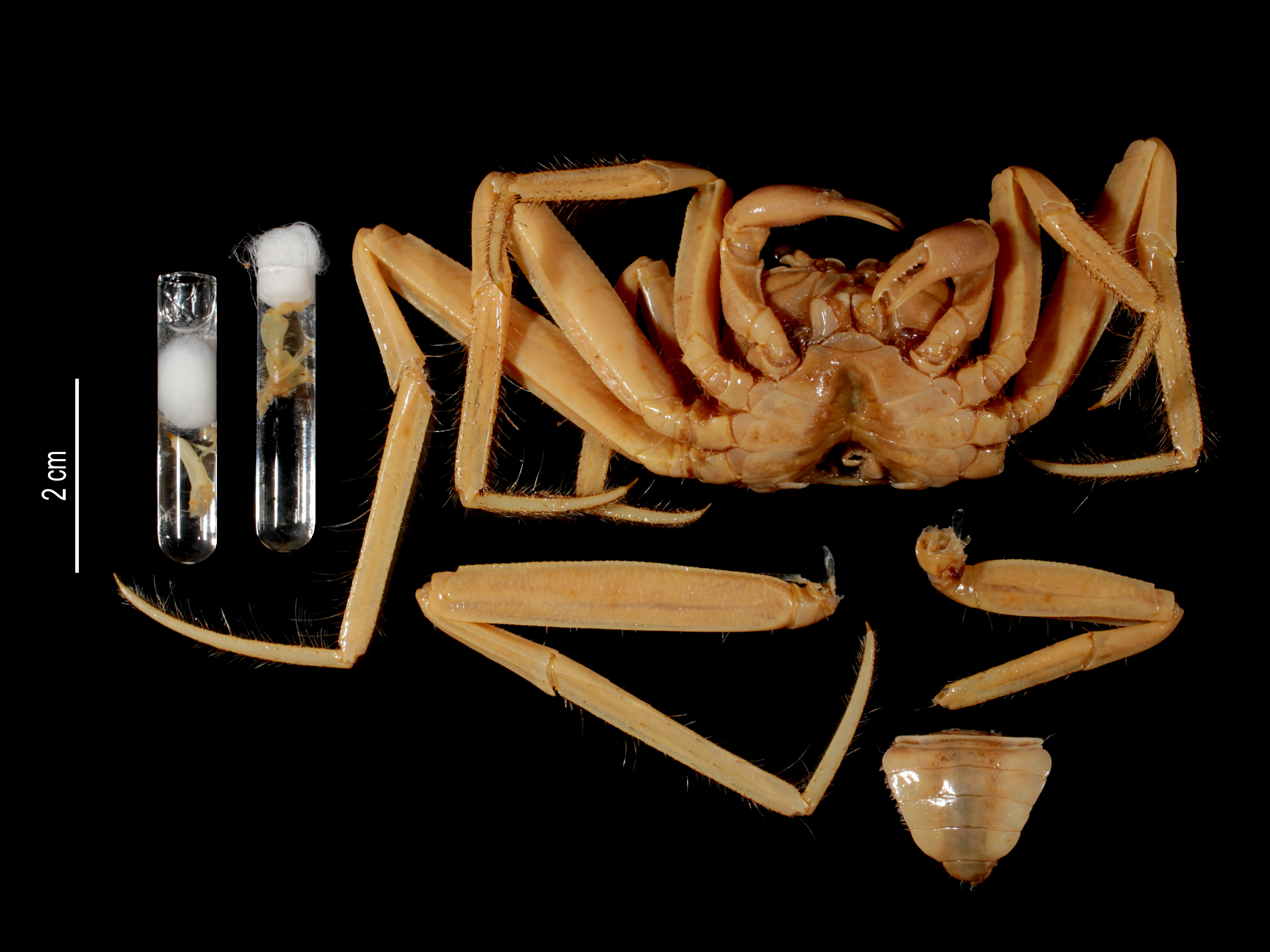
- Karstarma ultrapes

Scientific classification
- Kingdom: Animalia
- Phylum: Arthropoda
- Clade: Pancrustacea
- Class: Malacostraca
- Order: Decapoda
- Suborder: Pleocyemata
- Infraorder: Brachyura
- Family: Sesarmidae
- Genus: Karstarma; Davie & Ng, 2007

Type species
- Karstarma boholano Ng, 2002

Synonyms
- Karstama Davie & Ng, 2007

= Karstarma =

Genus of crabs

Karstarma is a genus of karst-dwelling crabs formerly included in Sesarmoides.

== Description ==
Karstarma is distinguished from the closely related Sesarmoides by the lack of a stridulatory structure on the cheliped which is present in the latter genus.

== Ecology & biogeography ==
All species in the genus Karstarma are typically found in anchialine pools across the Indo-Pacific.

== Taxonomy ==
The genus name Karstarma is derived from the word karst, in arbitrary combination with the genus name Sesarma. It has been frequently misspelt Karstama, including in the original description.

In the original description of the genus, 12 species were included. Three species have since been added. A new species, K. vulcan, was also described from Réunion in 2018; this species is unique from all others as it is found in the western Indian Ocean rather than the eastern Indian or Pacific Oceans.

- Karstarma ardea Wowor & Ng, 2009
- Karstarma balicum (Ng, 2002)
- Karstarma boholano (Ng, 2002)
- Karstarma cerberus (Holthuis, 1946)
- Karstarma emdi (Ng & Whitten, 1995)
- Karstarma guamense (Ng, 2002)
- Karstarma jacksoni (Balss, 1934)
- Karstarma jacobsoni (Ihle, 1912)
- Karstarma loyalty (Ng, 2002)
- Karstarma malang Wowor & Ng, 2018
- Karstarma microphthalmus (Naruse & Ng, 2007)
- Karstarma novabritannia (Ng, 1988)
- Karstarma philippinarum Husana et al., 2010
- Karstarma sulu (Ng, 2002)
- Karstarma ultrapes (Ng, Guinot & Iliffe, 1994)
- Karstarma umbra Ng, 2020
- Karstarma vulcan Poupin, Crestey & Le Guelte, 2018
- Karstarma waigeo Wowor & Ng, 2009
