= A. americanum =

A. americanum may refer to:

- Acanthobothrium americanum, a species of flatworm in the genus Acanthobothrium
- Acanthostomum americanum, a species of fluke in the family Cryptogonimidae
- Achradocera americanum, a species of fly in the genus Achradocera
- Actinotaenium americanum, a species of green algae in the genus Actinotaenium
- Aculeastrum americanum, a species of fungus in the family Coleosporiaceae
- Alphahypovirus americanum, a species of virus in the family Hypoviridae
- Amblyomma americanum, a species of tick
- Americhelidium americanum, a species of amphipod in the genus Oedicerotidae
- Amygdalum americanum, a species of mussel in the genus Amygdalum
- Anisomeridium americanum, a species of lichen in the genus Anisomeridium
- Aphetoceras americanum, a species of fossil cephalopod in the genus Aphetoceras
- Arceuthobium americanum, a species of mistletoe
- Armases americanum, a species of crab in the genus Armases
- Atrema americanum, a species of flowering plant in the family Apiaceae
