= Geosesarma aedituens =

Scientific classification
- Domain: Eukaryota
- Kingdom: Animalia
- Phylum: Arthropoda
- Class: Malacostraca
- Order: Decapoda
- Suborder: Pleocyemata
- Infraorder: Brachyura
- Family: Sesarmidae
- Genus: Geosesarma
- Species: G. aedituens

Binomial name
- Geosesarma aedituens Naruse & Jaafar, 2009

Species of crab

Geosearma aedituens is a species of terrestrial crab in the family Sesarmidae.
