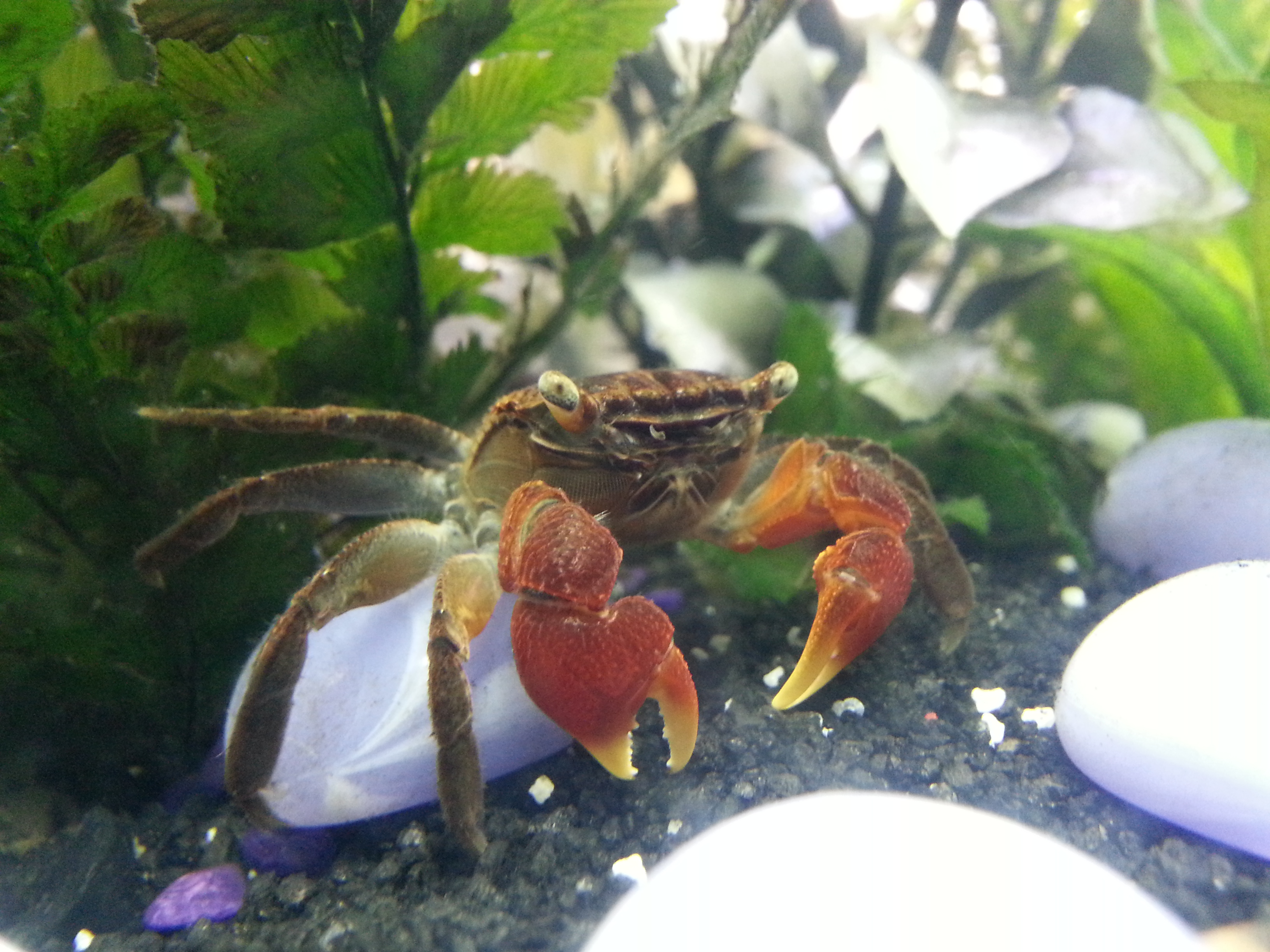

Scientific classification
- Kingdom: Animalia
- Phylum: Arthropoda
- Class: Malacostraca
- Order: Decapoda
- Suborder: Pleocyemata
- Infraorder: Brachyura
- Family: Sesarmidae
- Genus: Parasesarma
- Species: P. bidens

Binomial name
- Parasesarma bidens (De Haan, 1835)

Synonyms
- Grapsus (Pachysoma) bidens De Haan, 1835; Perisesarma bidens (De Haan, 1835); Sesarma bidens (De Haan, 1835)

= Parasesarma bidens =

Species of crab

Parasesarma bidens, the red claw crab (or red-clawed crab), is a species of crab found in the Indo-Pacific region from Zanzibar to Japan and Fiji.

== Size ==
Parasesarma bidens can have a leg span up to 100 mm (4 in). Carapace length is usually no more than 51 mm (2 in).
