= Geosesarma rouxi =

Scientific classification
- Kingdom: Animalia
- Phylum: Arthropoda
- Class: Malacostraca
- Order: Decapoda
- Suborder: Pleocyemata
- Infraorder: Brachyura
- Family: Sesarmidae
- Genus: Geosesarma
- Species: G. rouxi

Binomial name
- Geosesarma rouxi Serène, 1968

Species of semi-terrestrial crab

Geosesarma rouxi is a species of small, semi-terrestrial freshwater crabs native to Java, Indonesia. They are commonly known in the pet trade as rainbow vampire crabs.

== Description ==
Adult G. rouxi can reach 2 inches in size, with a yellow and light blue carapace and dark red legs.
