= Geosesarma larsi =

Scientific classification
- Kingdom: Animalia
- Phylum: Arthropoda
- Class: Malacostraca
- Order: Decapoda
- Suborder: Pleocyemata
- Infraorder: Brachyura
- Family: Sesarmidae
- Genus: Geosesarma
- Species: G. larsi

Binomial name
- Geosesarma larsi Ng & Grinang, 2018

Species of crab

Geosesarma larsi is a species of small land-living highland crab found in western Sarawak, Borneo. Adults have a carapace width of 12–15 mm and are of a purplish-red colour, which distinguishes them from other Geosesarma species in Borneo. The species is threatened by the loss of their small habitat.

Geosesarma larsi is named after the German photographer and naturalist Lars Fehlandt, who discovered this species during an expedition in December 2016.
