= Parasesarma erythrodactyla =

Scientific classification
- Kingdom: Animalia
- Phylum: Arthropoda
- Clade: Pancrustacea
- Class: Malacostraca
- Order: Decapoda
- Suborder: Pleocyemata
- Infraorder: Brachyura
- Family: Sesarmidae
- Genus: Parasesarma
- Species: P. erythrodactyla

Binomial name
- Parasesarma erythrodactyla (Hess, 1865)

Species of crab

Parasesarma erythrodactyla, also known as the red-handed shore crab, is a burrowing crab inhabiting mangrove forests in Australia and Southeast Asia. It is immediately identifiable by its bright red chelipeds (claws) and green/brown carapace.

Distribution of P. erythrodactyla occurs mainly in tropical and subtropical regions along eastern Australia, Indonesia, Taiwan, Korea and India. They may also occur along southern Australia (to be verified).

P. erythrodactyla relies mangrove leaf detritus for about 65%-80% of its nutrition, and on benthic microalgae such as diatoms for between 20% and 35% of its nutrition.

Sesarmid crabs are generally considered to be a monophyletic taxon (that is, all genetically deriving from a common ancestor) of Grapsoidea, but recent reclassifications of the genera Sesarma and Parasesarma (both considered polyphyletic) have resulted in a reshuffling of the species.

A type specimen exists in the Melbourne Museum Discovery Centre (object drawer 15).
