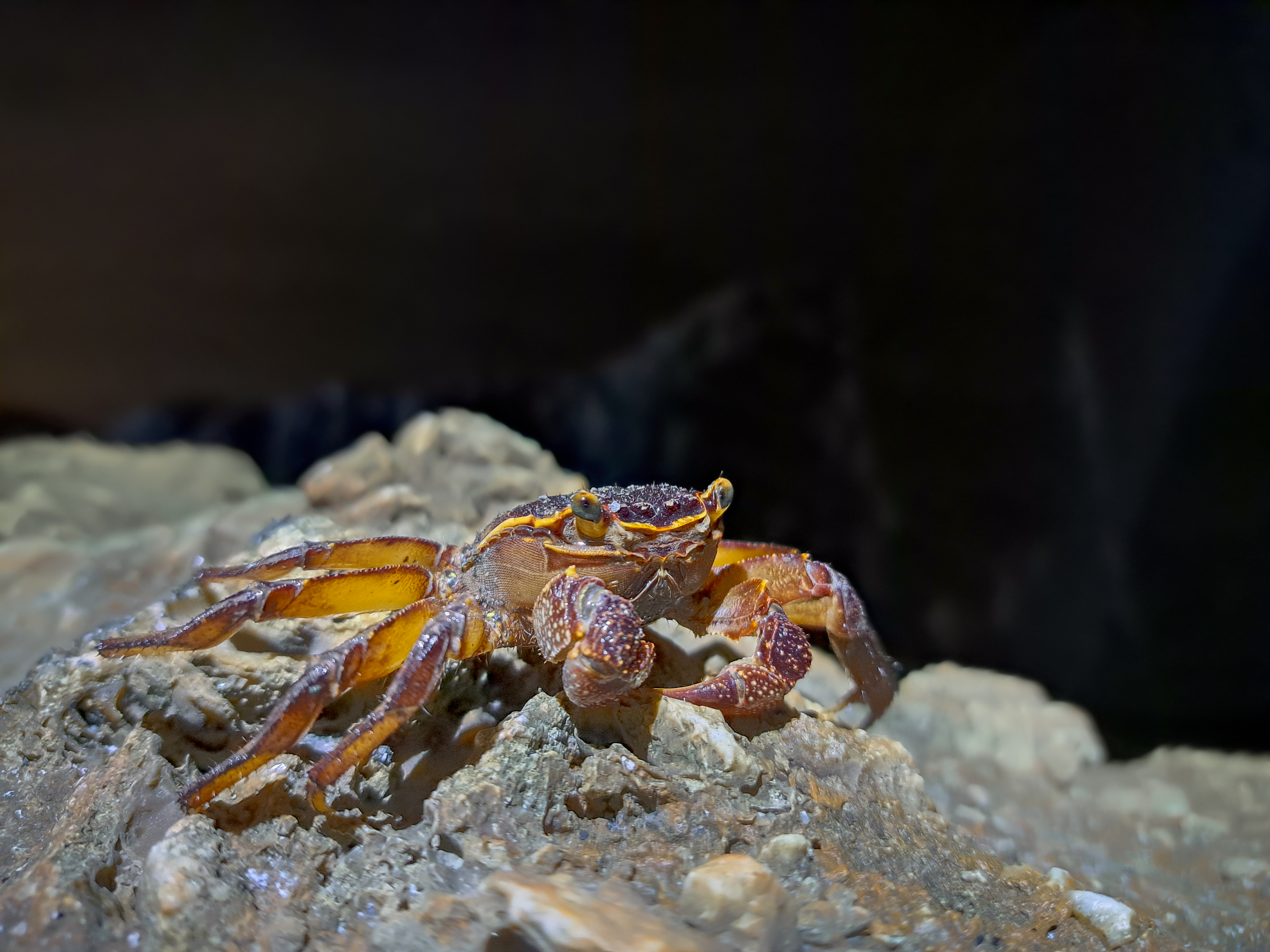
- Sesarmops imperator

Scientific classification
- Kingdom: Animalia
- Phylum: Arthropoda
- Class: Malacostraca
- Order: Decapoda
- Suborder: Pleocyemata
- Infraorder: Brachyura
- Family: Sesarmidae
- Genus: Sesarmops; Serène & Soh, 1970

= Sesarmops =

Genus of crabs

Sesarmops is a genus of crabs in the family Sesarmidae. Its members are distributed through the Indo-West-Pacific oceanic region. They live in freshwater forest streams near the coast, and in mangroves.

== Taxonomy ==
Sesarmops was defined in 1970 when Serène and Soh re-organised the existing genus Sesarma. They included five species: S. atrorubens, S. impressus, S. intermedius, S. mindanaoensis, S. sinensis.

Serène and Soh defined Sesarmops as having (1) the carapace as long or longer than the width measured at the external orbital teeth, (2) the frontal margin has a deep median concavity, (3) the postfrontal lobes are prominent, (4) the external orbital tooth is clearly separated from the rest of the lateral margin by a distinct cleft, (5) with the gastric and cardiac regions well defined.

Ng et al. provisionally added Sesarma weberi in 2008, Paulay and Starmer (2011) transferred Sesarma angustifrons to the genus in 2011.

As a culmination of work through the 2000s and 2010s, the genus was revised in January and December 2020. Species were split and redefined, while two species were transferred to a new genus.

The type species Sesarmops impressum (formerly Sesarma impressa) and related species were reviewed by Ng et al. in 2020. S. impressa sensu lato from the West Pacific have different colouration and gonopods to those of the Indian Ocean. Ng, Li, & Shih restricted S. impressesus to the West Indian Ocean populations, defining S. indicus in the East Indian and S. imperator in the West Pacific oceans. The type locality for S. indicus is the Andaman Islands, records from northern Sumatra, Mentawai Islands Regency, and Enggano Islands are provisionally referred to as the same species.

Hess's original types, from "Sydney", for S. atrorubens and S. similis are lost. Scholars believe that he received the specimens via Sydney, and that they were collected elsewhere. Ng et al. designated neotypes from Fiji and Samoa, respectively.

Comparisons of mitochondrial DNA found that S. impressus and S. imperator form a clade sister to Bresedium eurypleon and B. brevipes, indicating that Sesarmops is paraphyletic to. S. mora is sister to the impressum–Bresidium clade, whilst the Sesarmops intermedius complex, Pseudosesarma patshuni, and the Chiromantes dehaani complex form another grouping. S. mindanaoensis was found to be more distantly related than the other Pseudosesarma species (edwardsii, boucourtii, crassimarum). The latter group (intermedius–patshuni–dehaani) was re-classified into a new genus Orisarma by Schubart & Ng (2020), having five species.

== Species ==
As at 2023, the World Register of Marine Species recognises 9 species of Sesarmops, with two former species moved to Orisarma.

- Sesarmops angustifrons (A. Milne-Edwards, 1869)
- Sesarmops atrorubens (1865) – Fiji.
- Sesarmops imperator Ng, Li & Shih, 2020 – East Asia to Taiwan and Ryukyus.
- Sesarmops impressus (H. Milne Edwards, 1837) – Madagascar, Comoros, Mayotte.
- Sesarmops indicus Ng, Li & Shih, 2020 – Andaman Islands. Possibly north Sumatra and nearby islands.
- Sesarmops mindanaoensis (Rathbun, 1914) – Taiwan (Pingtung) and Philippines (Cebu and Bohol)
- Sesarmops mora Li, Shih & Ng, 2020 – Taiwan (Pingtung), Philippines (Cebu and Bohol), Indonesia (Sulawesi and Manado)
- Sesarmops similis (Hess, 1865) – Samoa.
- Sesarmops sinensis = Orisarma sinense (H. Milne Edwards, 1853)
- Sesarmops weberi (De Man, 1892)
