= Geosesarma albomita =

Scientific classification
- Domain: Eukaryota
- Kingdom: Animalia
- Phylum: Arthropoda
- Class: Malacostraca
- Order: Decapoda
- Suborder: Pleocyemata
- Infraorder: Brachyura
- Family: Sesarmidae
- Genus: Geosesarma
- Species: G. albomita

Binomial name
- Geosesarma albomita Yeo & Ng, 1999

Species of crab

Geosesarma albomita is a species of crab of the genus Geosesarma found in Tioman Island, Malaysia.
