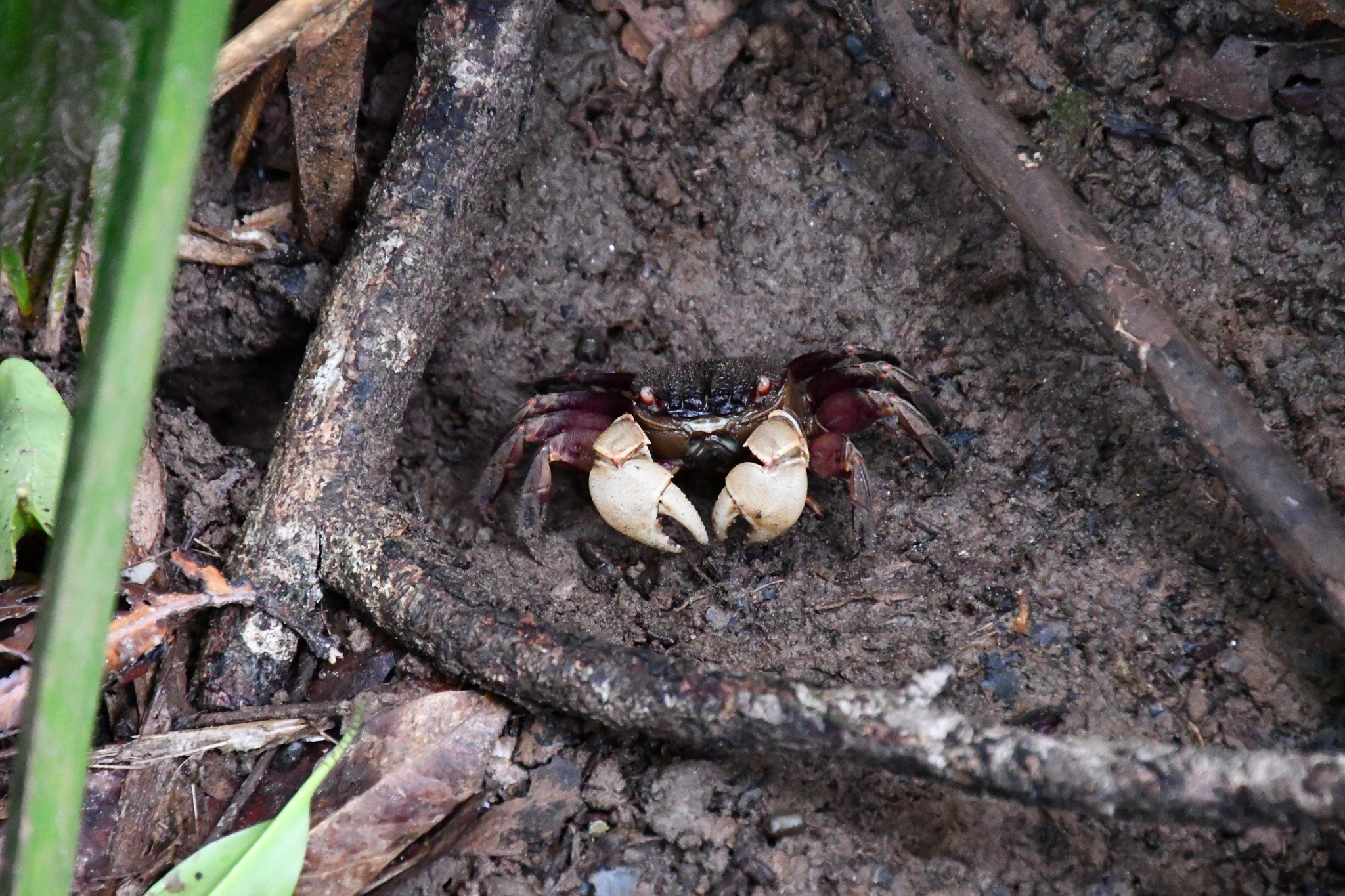

Scientific classification
- Domain: Eukaryota
- Kingdom: Animalia
- Phylum: Arthropoda
- Class: Malacostraca
- Order: Decapoda
- Suborder: Pleocyemata
- Infraorder: Brachyura
- Family: Sesarmidae
- Genus: Tiomanium
- Species: T. indicum

Binomial name
- Tiomanium indicum H. Milne Edwards, (1837)

= Tiomanium indicum =

Species of crab

Tiomanium indicum, commonly known as the Tioman crab or the white clawed mangrove crab, is a crab in the family Sesarmidae. It inhabits the Western and central Indo-Pacific ocean, including Singapore, Malaysia, Australia (Queensland), the Philippines and New Guinea. Tioman crabs are supralittoral (live above the high tide line). In Cairns, Australia they are known for moving in numbers in some seasons entering backyards and homes. This species was originally described by H. Milne Edwards in 1837 as Sesarma indicum. It was placed in a new genus Tiomanium (originally Tiomanum) by Serene and Soh The carapace is convex and 34 mm length. Key features that differentiate Tiomanium from Neosarmatium include a spine at the end of the upper inner margin of the cheliped palm and a spine on the upper inner angle of the carpus.
