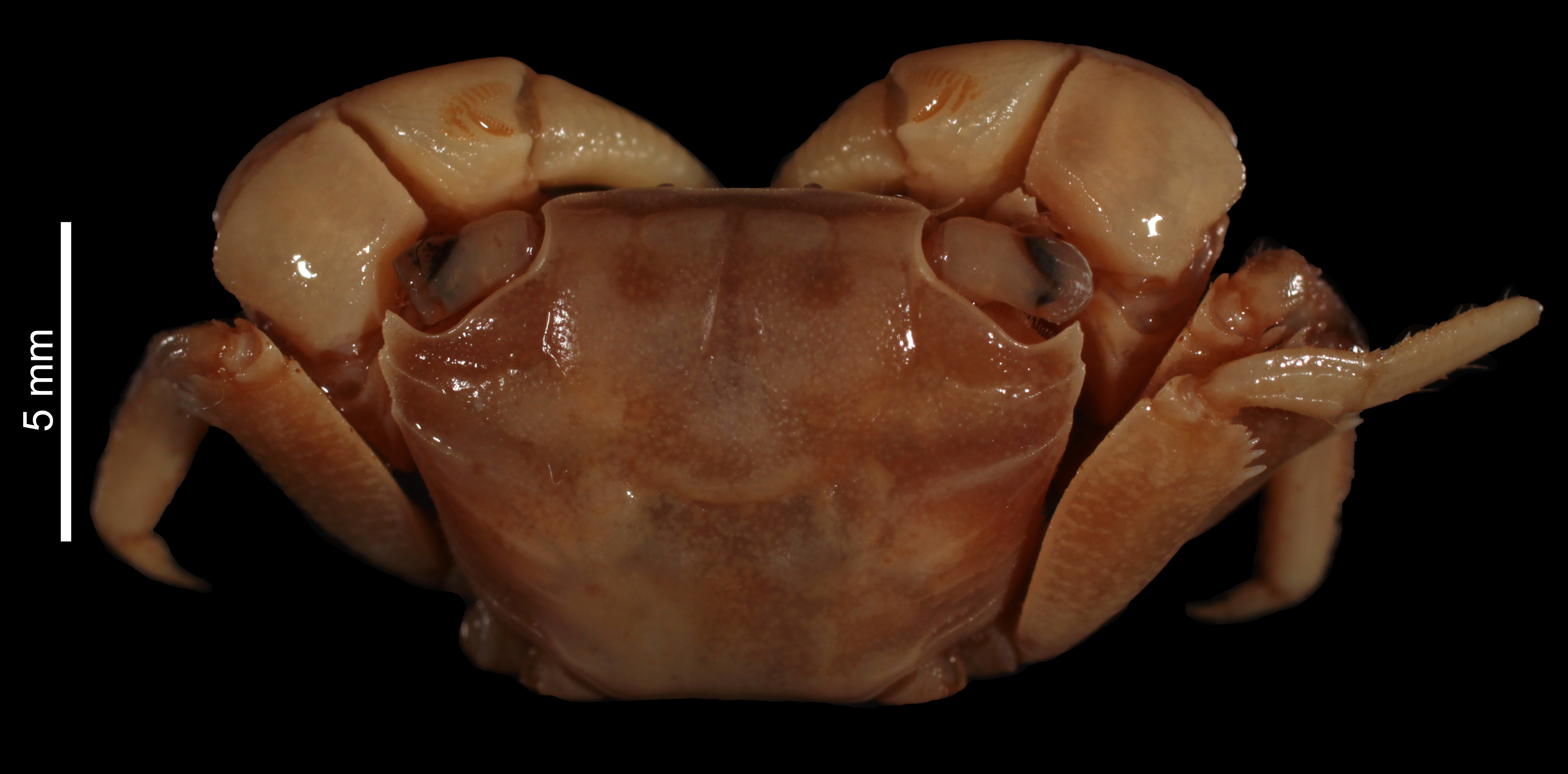
- Nanosesarma andersoni

Scientific classification
- Domain: Eukaryota
- Kingdom: Animalia
- Phylum: Arthropoda
- Class: Malacostraca
- Order: Decapoda
- Suborder: Pleocyemata
- Infraorder: Brachyura
- Family: Sesarmidae
- Genus: Nanosesarma; Tweedie, 1951

= Nanosesarma =

Genus of crabs

Nanosesarma is a genus of crabs belonging to the family Sesarmidae.

The species of this genus are found mostly on the coasts of Indian Ocean.

Species:

- Nanosesarma andersoni (de Man, 1888)
- Nanosesarma batavicum (Moreira, 1903)
