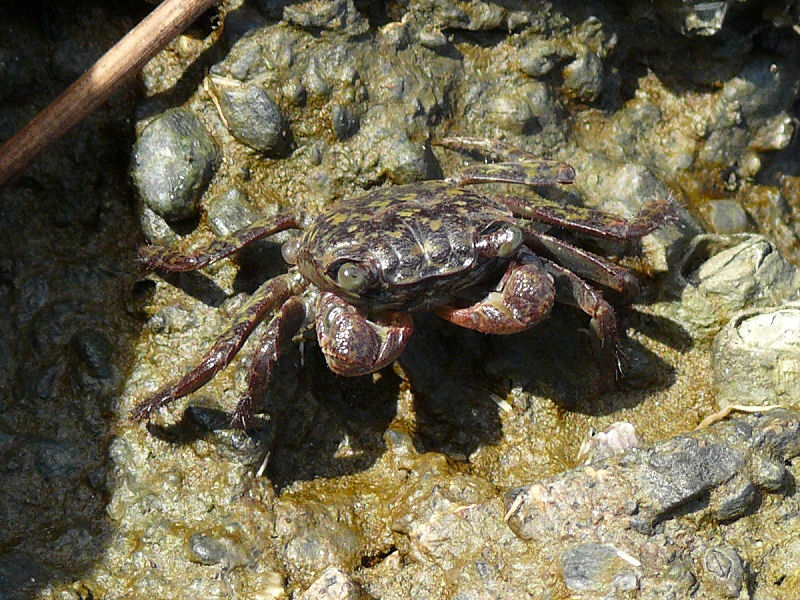

Scientific classification
- Domain: Eukaryota
- Kingdom: Animalia
- Phylum: Arthropoda
- Class: Malacostraca
- Order: Decapoda
- Suborder: Pleocyemata
- Infraorder: Brachyura
- Family: Sesarmidae
- Genus: Parasesarma
- Species: P. pictum

Binomial name
- Parasesarma pictum (De Haan, 1833)

= Parasesarma pictum =

Species of crab

Parasesarma pictum is a mudflat crab, belonging to the Sesarmidae family (subfamily Sesarminae), which is endemic to East Asia. This crab typically inhabits mangrove swamps, preferring the upper intertidal region of estuaries, and living in small crevices and abandoned holes made by other species. It eats leaf litter and other vegetation. The breeding season of P. pictum is between May and September.

== Characteristics ==
Like other sesarmid crabs, P. pictum has a square carapace. Its chelae are covered with scaly tubercles that wear down as the crab ages, and some short setae (hairs). The inside of the claw of the crab is smooth, although many ridges and fine granules are present on the movable portion; these ridges and granules are smaller in female and juvenile crabs than in adult males. The top portion (merus) of the walking legs of this crab are broad relative to the lower limb.
