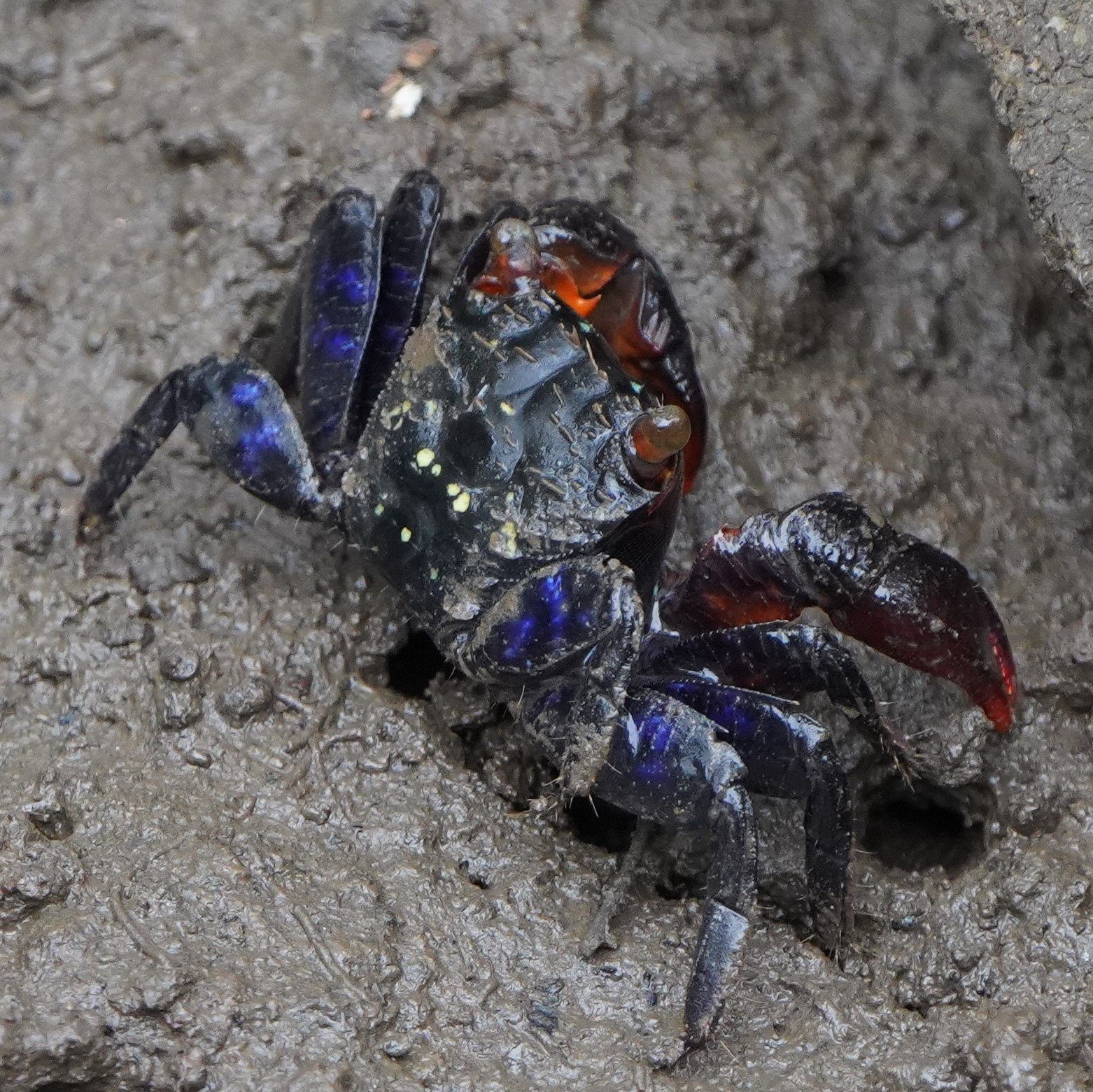

Scientific classification
- Kingdom: Animalia
- Phylum: Arthropoda
- Class: Malacostraca
- Order: Decapoda
- Suborder: Pleocyemata
- Infraorder: Brachyura
- Family: Sesarmidae
- Genus: Parasesarma
- Species: P. messa

Binomial name
- Parasesarma messa (Campbell, 1967)

Synonyms
- Perisesarma messa (Campbell, 1967); Sesarma (Chiromantes) messa Campbell, 1967

= Parasesarma messa =

Species of crab

Parasesarma messa, commonly known as the maroon mangrove crab, is a species of burrowing crab found in Queensland, Australia. It lives in mangroves in estuaries and sheltered bays. It was originally described as Sesarma messa, but was placed in the genus Parasesarma in 2017. Perisesarma messa is also a synonym.

The species name ‘messa’ comes from the initial letters of "Medially Expanded Second Segment of Abdomen". The carapace is up to 25 mm (0.98 in) wide, with one tooth (notch) on the edge. The claws are a dark maroon color to nearly black. Claws in females are smaller than in males.
