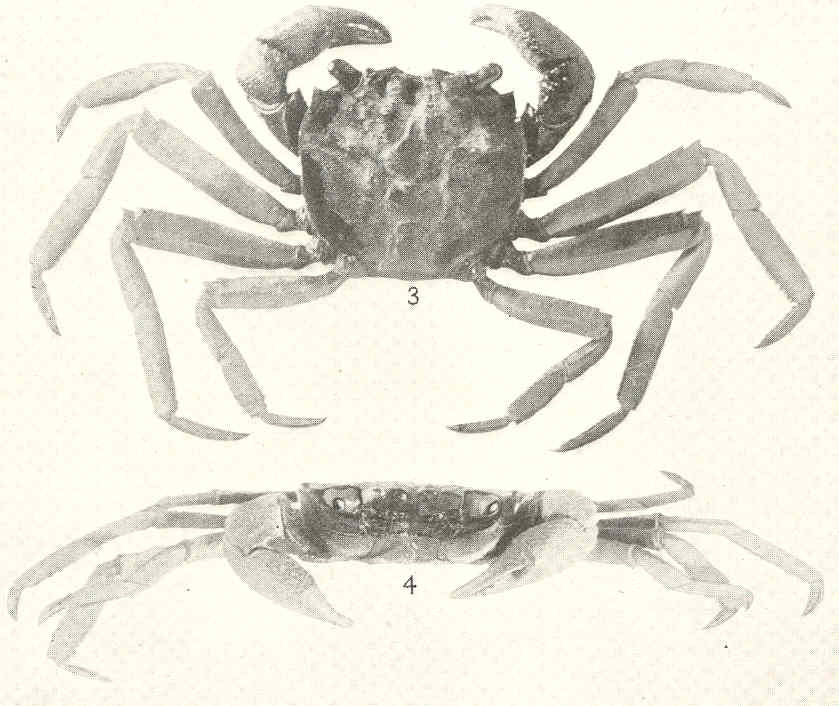

Scientific classification
- Kingdom: Animalia
- Phylum: Arthropoda
- Clade: Pancrustacea
- Class: Malacostraca
- Order: Decapoda
- Suborder: Pleocyemata
- Infraorder: Brachyura
- Family: Sesarmidae
- Genus: Metopaulias; Rathbun, 1896
- Species: M. depressus

Binomial name
- Metopaulias depressus Rathbun, 1896

= Metopaulias =

Genus of crabs

Metopaulias (from Ancient Greek μέτωπον, lit. "front", and αὐλος, "groove") is a monotypic genus of semiterrestrial land crabs which do not need to go back to the sea to spawn. Metopaulias depressus is a reddish-brown crab about 2 centimetres (0.79 in) wide which lives in the pools of water that form in leaves of bromeliads in Jamaica. The female lays about 90 eggs, then tends to her offspring, removing dead leaves that would deoxygenate the water and adding snail shells to the pool to provide high levels of calcium that they require, catching cockroaches and millipedes to feed them, and killing larvae of the damselfly Diceratobasis macrogaster which would otherwise eat them.
