= Habitrail =

Brand name for a hamster cage

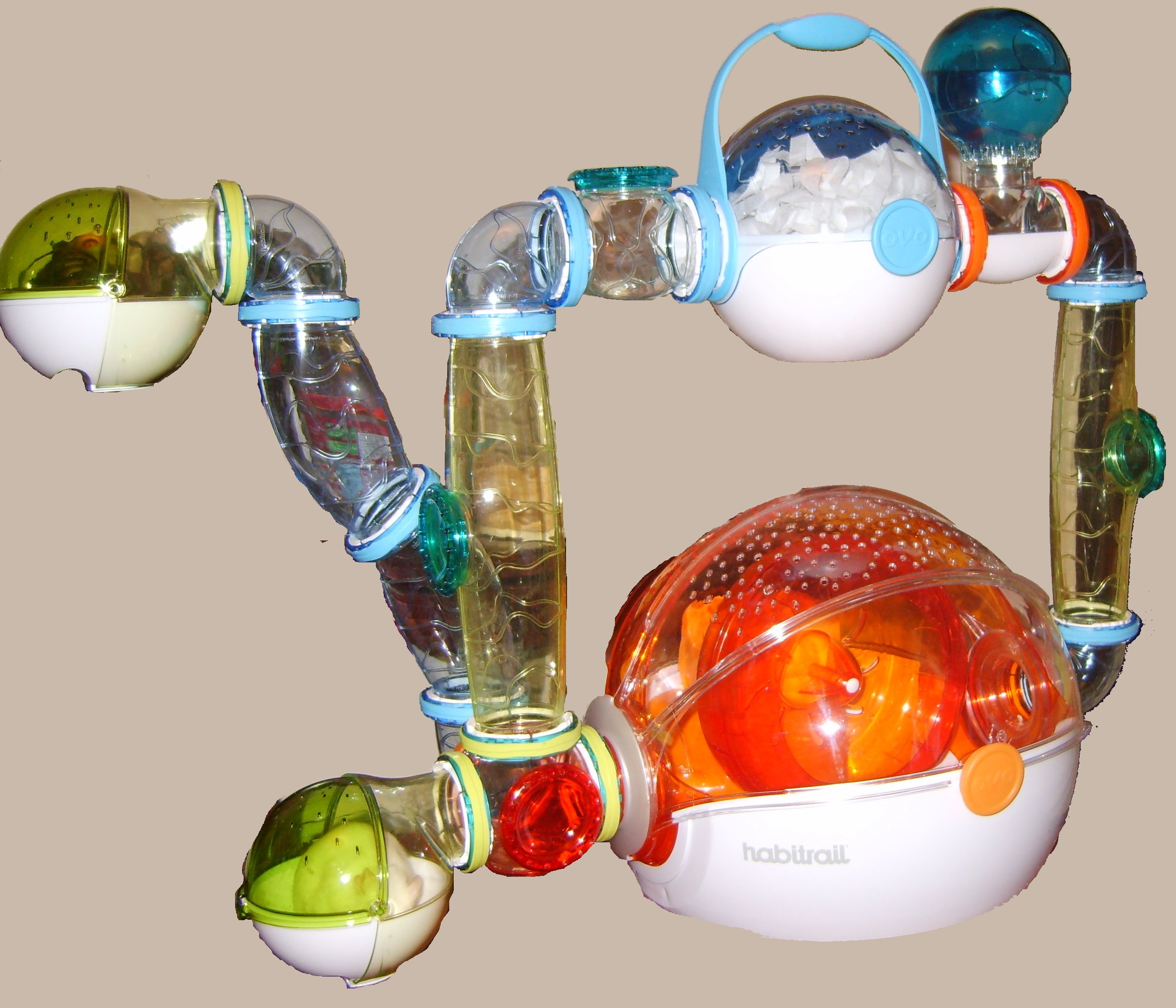
An example of the Habitrail OVO system

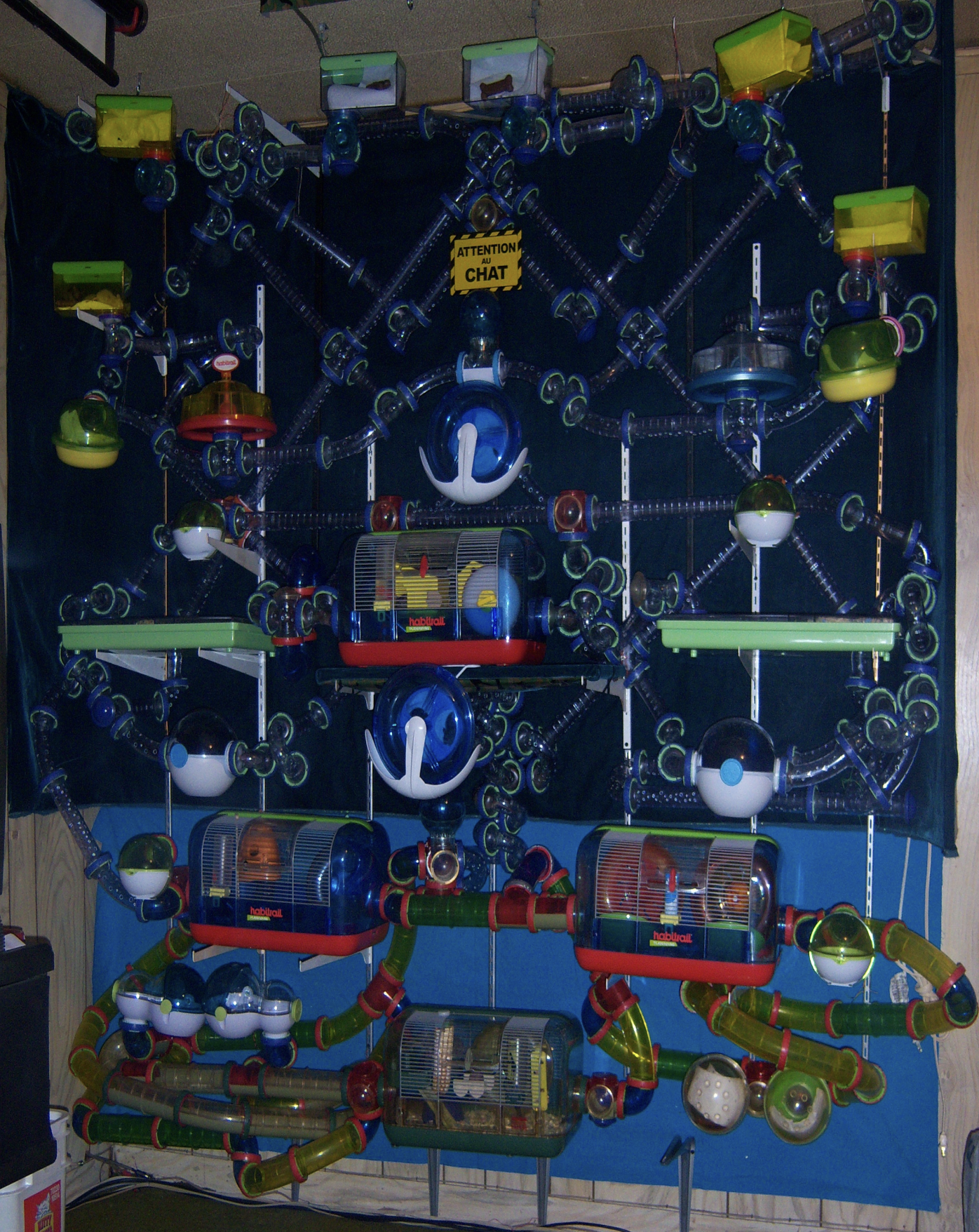

Habitrail is a brand name for a hamster cage made by the Hagen corporation. It is a series of translucent plastic tubes and "houses" for use in home terrariums, designed specially for hamsters. The design of the Habitrail is modular and can be configured however the owner likes, as well as disassembled for cleaning. The Habitrail is meant to mimic the habitat of the animal in question, usually a warren, or series of tunnels. The mascot for Habitrail is "Herbie the Hamster", who even has a video game based on him called Habitrail Hamster Ball produced by Data Design Interactive in 2005 and released for the PS2, and the PC.

== Reception ==
Habitrails are rather small. This tends to be a problem for Syrian hamsters, who often get lodged in the tubes, particularly those that are pregnant. Conversely, Habitrails tend to be too large to work well for dwarf hamsters, such as the Roborovski and White Russian types, as they can not climb up the tube. In response, the Rolf C. Hagen Corp. introduced two new housings in 2007: the Habitrail OVO, which featured a larger modular design that also made it easier to observe hamsters and maintain their housing, and a similar cage with narrower tubes designed for dwarfs.

The wheel(s) that come with the Habitrail OVO cage have three long holes that line the middle of the wheel where the hamster is to run; Habitrail has stated that the holes are to allow waste to drop through, but the legs of hamsters (especially the dwarfs) tend to fall into the holes. The high & smooth stairs leading to the feeding dish tend to be difficult for smaller hamsters to negotiate.

== Popular usage ==
The word "habitrail" is also used in reference to enclosed pedestrian walkways, particularly those with few or no side branches, offering no personal choice of route, and those interconnecting unpleasant workplaces such as factories and office buildings.

The Habitrail has become such a long-running institution that the name has almost become a generic word for any maze-like tubular structure: for example, "habitrail" is a common term for the raised wire-form ball guide in a pinball machine.
