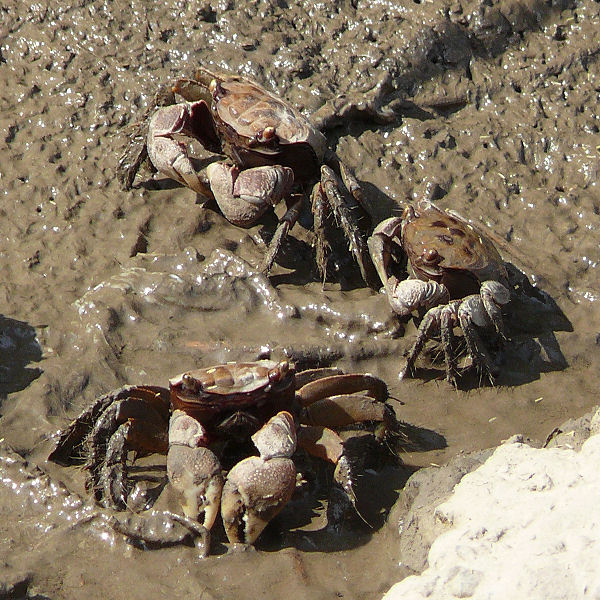

Scientific classification
- Kingdom: Animalia
- Phylum: Arthropoda
- Clade: Pancrustacea
- Class: Malacostraca
- Order: Decapoda
- Suborder: Pleocyemata
- Infraorder: Brachyura
- Family: Sesarmidae
- Genus: Orisarma
- Species: O. dehaani

Binomial name
- Orisarma dehaani (H. Milne Edwards, 1853)

= Orisarma dehaani =

Species of crab

Orisarma dehaani is a mudflat crab of the Sesarmidae family (subfamily Sesarminae), which is endemic to East Asia. It typically lives in mangrove swamps and is known under the common name kurobenkeigani in Japan. O. dehaani has an uneven carapace, which is divided into four frontal lobes. Its walking legs are covered with thick, long setae (hairs), while the palm surfaces of its rough, granular chelipeds (claws) contain tubercules.
