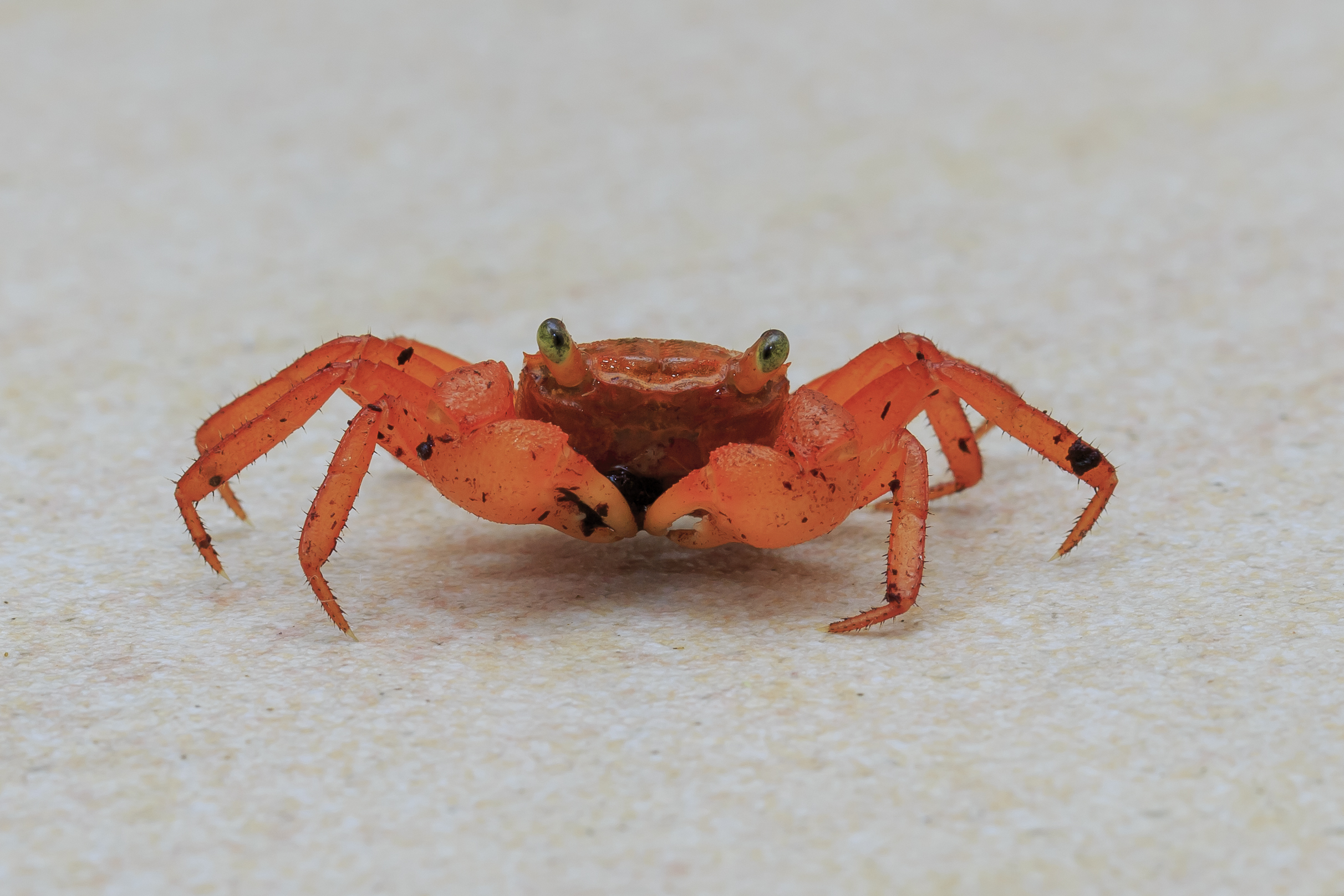
- Geosesarma aurantium

Scientific classification
- Kingdom: Animalia
- Phylum: Arthropoda
- Clade: Pancrustacea
- Class: Malacostraca
- Order: Decapoda
- Suborder: Pleocyemata
- Infraorder: Brachyura
- Family: Sesarmidae
- Genus: Geosesarma; De Man, 1892

Type species
- Sesarma noduliferum de Man, 1892

= Geosesarma =

Genus of crabs

Geosesarma is genus of small freshwater or terrestrial crabs, typically less than 10 mm (0.4 in) across the carapace. They live and reproduce on land with the larval stages inside the egg. They are found in India, Indonesia, Malaysia, Thailand, the Philippines, the Solomon Islands and Hawaii.

In the pet trade, they are called vampire crabs. This has nothing to do with their feeding habits, but rather with the bright, contrastingly yellow eyes of some Geosesarma species.. However not all vampire crab species have bright yellow eyes; some species have white or black eyes.

== Species ==
Geosesarma contains these species:

- Geosesarma aedituens Naruse & Jaafar, 2009
- Geosesarma albomita Yeo & Ng, 1999
- Geosesarma ambawang Ng, 2015
- Geosesarma amphinome (De Man, 1899)
- Geosesarma anambas Ng, Wowor & Yeo, 2023
- Geosesarma angustifrons (A. Milne-Edwards, 1869)
- Geosesarma araneum (Nobili, 1899)
- Geosesarma aurantium Ng, 1995
- Geosesarma batak Manuel-Santos, Ng & Freitag, 2016
- Geosesarma bau Ng & Jongkar, 2004
- Geosesarma bicolor Ng & Davie, 1995
- Geosesarma bintan T. M. Leong, 2014
- Geosesarma cataracta Ng, 1986
- Geosesarma celebense (Schenkel, 1902)
- Geosesarma clavicrure (Schenkel, 1902)
- Geosesarma confertum (Ortmann, 1894)
- Geosesarma danumense Ng, 2003
- Geosesarma dennerle Ng, Schubart & Lukhaup, 2015
- Geosesarma foxi (Kemp, 1918)
- Geosesarma gordonae (Serène, 1968)
- Geosesarma gracillimum (De Man, 1902)
- Geosesarma hagen Ng, Schubart & Lukhaup, 2015
- Geosesarma hednon Ng, Liu & Schubart, 2003
- Geosesarma ianthina Pretzmann, 1985
- Geosesarma insulare Ng, 1986
- Geosesarma johnsoni (Serène, 1968)
- Geosesarma katibas Ng, 1995
- Geosesarma krathing Ng & Naiyanetr, 1992
- Geosesarma larsi Ng & Grinang, 2018
- Geosesarma lawrencei Manuel-Santos & Yeo, 2007
- Geosesarma leprosum (Schenkel, 1902)
- Geosesarma maculatum (De Man, 1892)
- Geosesarma malayanum Ng & Lim, 1986
- Geosesarma mirum Shy & Ng, 2019
- Geosesarma nannophyes (De Man, 1885)
- Geosesarma nemesis Ng, 1986
- Geosesarma nigripes Ng & Wowor, 2024
- Geosesarma noduliferum (De Man, 1892)
- Geosesarma notophorum Ng & C. G. S. Tan, 1995
- Geosesarma ocypodum (Nobili, 1899)
- Geosesarma penangense (Tweedie, 1940)
- Geosesarma peraccae (Nobili, 1903)
- Geosesarma protos Ng & Takeda, 1992
- Geosesarma rathbunae (Serène, 1968)
- Geosesarma riani Ng & Wowor, 2024
- Geosesarma rouxi (Serène, 1968)
- Geosesarma sabanum Ng, 1992
- Geosesarma sarawakense (Serène, 1968)
- Geosesarma scandens Ng, 1986
- Geosesarma serenei Ng, 1986
- Geosesarma solomonense (Serène, 1968)
- Geosesarma starmuhlneri Pretzmann, 1984
- Geosesarma sumatraense Ng, 1986
- Geosesarma sylvicola (De Man, 1892)
- Geosesarma ternatense (Serène, 1968)
- Geosesarma teschi Ng, 1986
- Geosesarma thelxinoe (De Man, 1908)
- Geosesarma tiomanicum Ng, 1986
- Geosesarma vicentense (Rathbun, 1914)

As of March 2015, professor Peter Ng of National University of Singapore has named 20 Geosesarma species, and he "has another half a dozen or so newly collected Geosesarma species from Southeast Asia in his lab, and these species still need to be named and described."

== Threats ==
Geosesarma dennerle and Geosesarma hagen, both originally from Java, are threatened by illegal overcollection for the aquarium trade.
