= Rolf C. Hagen Group =

Pet supplies company headquartered in Montreal, Quebec, Canada

Hagen
- Company type: International Private Company
- Industry: Pet Supplies
- Founded: 1955
- Headquarters: Montreal, Quebec, Canada
- Key people: Rolf C. Hagen (Chairman of the Board)
- Products: Aquaclear; Fluval; Marina; Habitrail; Exo Terra
- Website: www.hagen.com

Hagen Inc. (officially The Rolf C. Hagen Group of Companies) is a pet supplies company headquartered in Montreal, Quebec, Canada, and founded in 1955 by Rolf C. Hagen with the help of his brothers, Dieter and Horst. Dieter and Horst Hagen joined the company later after immigrating from Germany, becoming key members of the firm.

== History ==
Rolf C. Hagen began acquiring bird seeds from the prairies in Western Canada with the intention of exporting them back to Germany, where he had established contacts. This was the initial stage of his new venture before expanding his business into a diverse pet supplies manufacturer. During the past fifty years, the Hagen Group of Companies was able to export its business from Canada to the international market. Its customers include small and local pet stores in Canada and the United States and publicly owned "box stores" such as PetSmart and Petco.

Its global head office is located in Montreal, Quebec, Canada, and was completed in June 2006.

Rolf C. Hagen died of a heart attack on 22 October 2011.

Hagen closed the Edmonton, Alberta warehouse. In Sept 2014, they opened a distribution center (3rd party logistics) in Calgary and still maintain a small office in Edmonton for order control and Western distribution control.

The crab Geosesarma hagen is named after the company, because of the company's support of Christoph D. Schubart and Christian Lukhaup. G. Hagen is a popular crab in the aquarium trade, where it was traded long before it was scientifically described.

== See also ==
- Fish food
