= Dennerle =

German aquarium supply company

Dennerle GmbH
- Native name: Dennerle GmbH
- Company type: Limited liability company (Gesellschaft mit beschränkter Haftung)
- Industry: Aquaristik
- Founded: 1966 in Pirmasens
- Founder: Ludwig Dennerle
- Headquarters: Münchweiler, Germany
- Key people: Peter Koch (CEO)
- Number of employees: ca. 165
- Website: www.dennerle.com

Dennerle is a German company producing aquarium and pond supplies. It was founded in 1966 as a pet store by Ludwig Dennerle in Pirmasens.

== Support of science ==
The crab Geosesarma dennerle is named after the company, because of the company's support of Christian Lukhaup. G. dennerle is a popular crab in the aquarium trade, where it was traded long before it was scientifically described.

The shrimp Caridina dennerli is also named after the company, which supported the expedition that led to the scientific description of the species. It is popularly known as the 'Cardinal Shrimp' in the aquarium trade.
