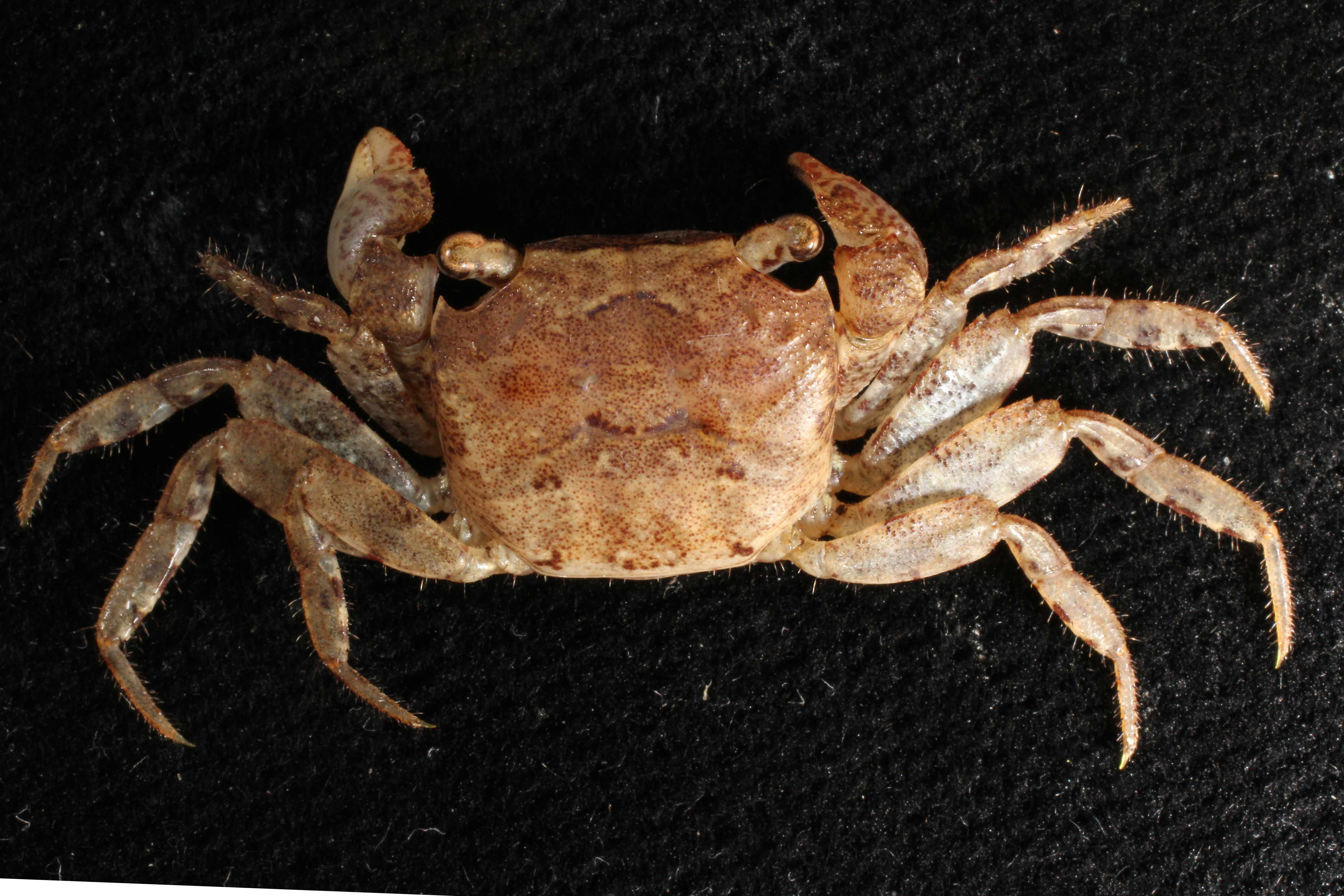
- A preserved specimen of M. obesum

Scientific classification
- Kingdom: Animalia
- Phylum: Arthropoda
- Class: Malacostraca
- Order: Decapoda
- Suborder: Pleocyemata
- Infraorder: Brachyura
- Family: Sesarmidae
- Genus: Metasesarma; H.Milne Edwards, 1853

Type species
- Metasesarma rousseauxi H. Milne Edwards, 1853

= Metasesarma =

Genus of crabs

Metasesarma is a genus of crabs in the family Sesarmidae.

== Species ==
WoRMS and GBIF list two species:

- Metasesarma aubryi (A. Milne-Edwards, 1869)
- Metasesarma obesum (Dana, 1851)
