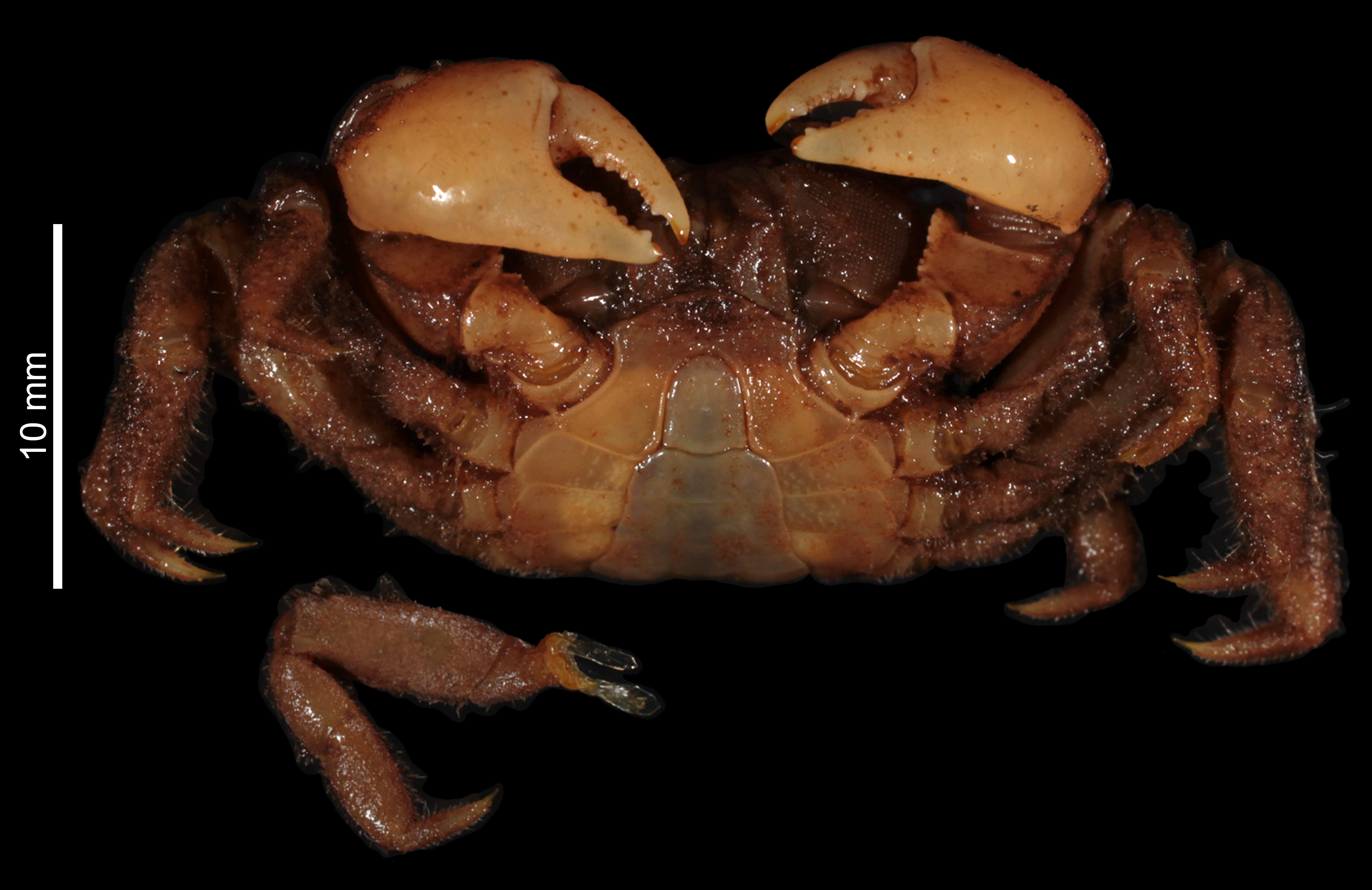
- A preserved specimen of Clistocoeloma melanesicum from the crustaceans collection at the Muséum National d'Histoire Naturelle (Paris, France).

Scientific classification
- Domain: Eukaryota
- Kingdom: Animalia
- Phylum: Arthropoda
- Class: Malacostraca
- Order: Decapoda
- Suborder: Pleocyemata
- Infraorder: Brachyura
- Family: Sesarmidae
- Genus: Clistocoeloma; H.Milne Edwards, 1873

= Clistocoeloma =

Genus of crabs

Clistocoeloma is a genus of small crabs in the family Sesarmidae. The crabs are native to the coasts of the Indo-Pacific. They inhabit intertidal zones and feed on detritus and smaller organisms.

== Species ==
These ten known species belong to the genus Clistocoeloma:

- Clistocoeloma amamaparense Rahayu & Takeda, 2000
- Clistocoeloma balansae A. Milne-Edwards, 1873
- Clistocoeloma lanatum (Alcock, 1900)
- Clistocoeloma melanesicum Lee, Ng & Ng, 2013
- Clistocoeloma merguiense De Man, 1888
- Clistocoeloma nobile Lee, Ng & Ng, 2023
- Clistocoeloma sinense Shen, 1933
- Clistocoeloma suvaense Edmondson, 1951
- Clistocoeloma tectum (Rathbun, 1914)
- Clistocoeloma villosum (A. Milne-Edwards, 1869)
