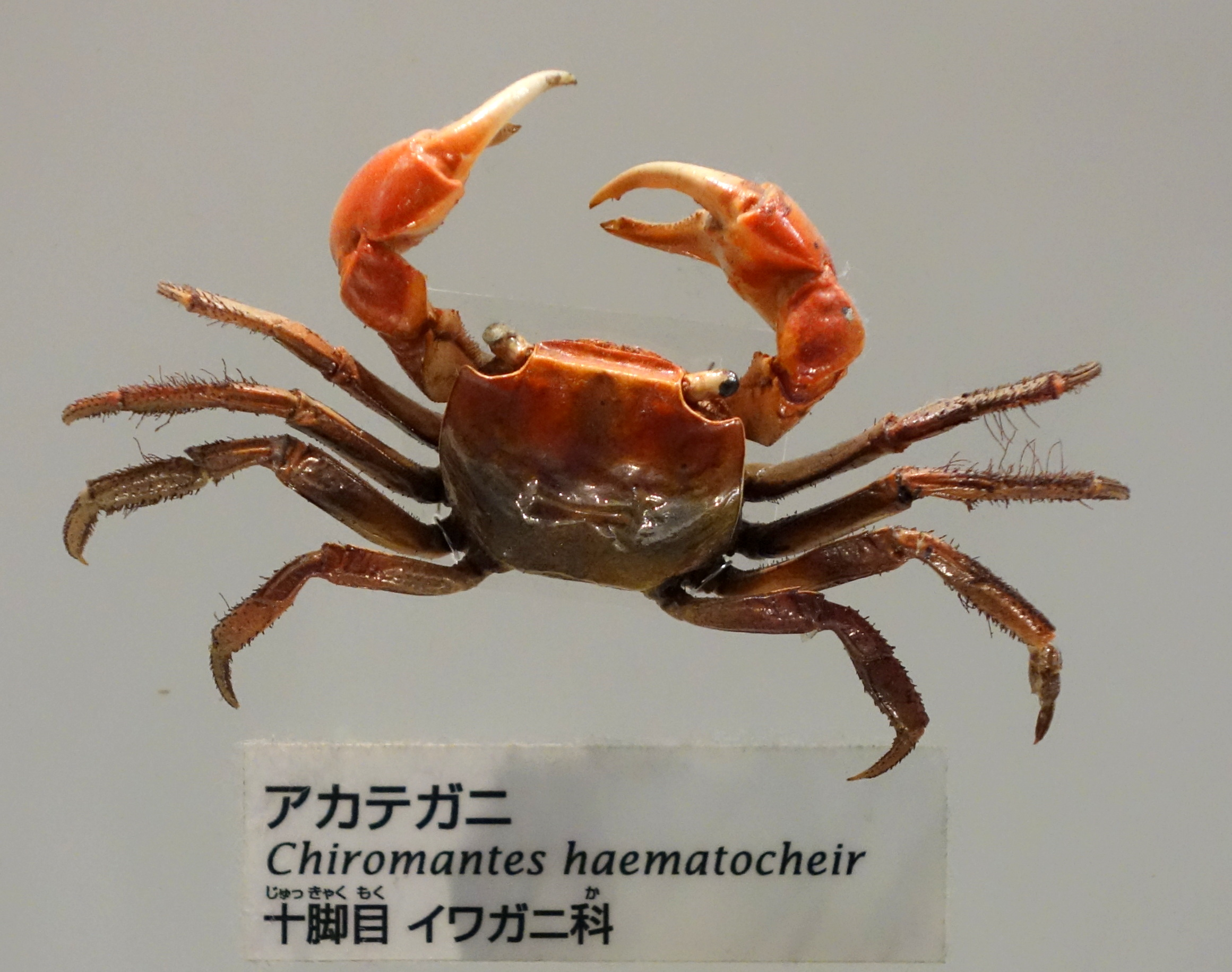

Scientific classification
- Kingdom: Animalia
- Phylum: Arthropoda
- Clade: Pancrustacea
- Class: Malacostraca
- Order: Decapoda
- Suborder: Pleocyemata
- Infraorder: Brachyura
- Family: Sesarmidae
- Genus: Chiromantes
- Species: C. haematocheir

Binomial name
- Chiromantes haematocheir (De Haan, 1833)

Synonyms
- List: Grapsus (Pachysoma) haematocheir De Haan, 1833; Holometopus haematocheir (De Haan, 1833); Holometopus serenei Soh, 1978; Perisesarma haematocheir (De Haan, 1833); Sesarma haematocheir (De Haan, 1833)

= Chiromantes haematocheir =

Species of crab

Red-clawed crab in Kanagawa, Japan

Chiromantes haematocheir, commonly known as the red-clawed crab, is a species of mudflat crab in the family Sesarmidae. It is endemic to East Asia. The crab is one of two species currently considered in the genus Chiromantes.

== Description ==
Chiromantes haematocheir has a square carapace with a smooth surface and irregular stripes along the sides. Males have large, smooth chelae with curved claws. The color of these crabs varies throughout their development; juvenile crabs typically have a white or yellow carapace, while adults are usually crimson red.

== Distribution ==
C. haematocheir is found across East Asia, including China, Taiwan, Korea, and Japan. However, in Japan the crab is absent in the central and southern islands of the Ryukyu island chain. Within this region, Chiromantes ryukyuanus is found instead.

== Mountain crabs ==
A variety of C. haematocheir can be found in Nagano prefecture, Japan, where elevations often exceed 600 metres (2,000 ft) above sea level, and distances to the ocean can be over 80 kilometres (50 mi). This indicates that they are freshwater crabs, probably living in forest streams, if they live in water at all.

== See also ==
- Land crab
