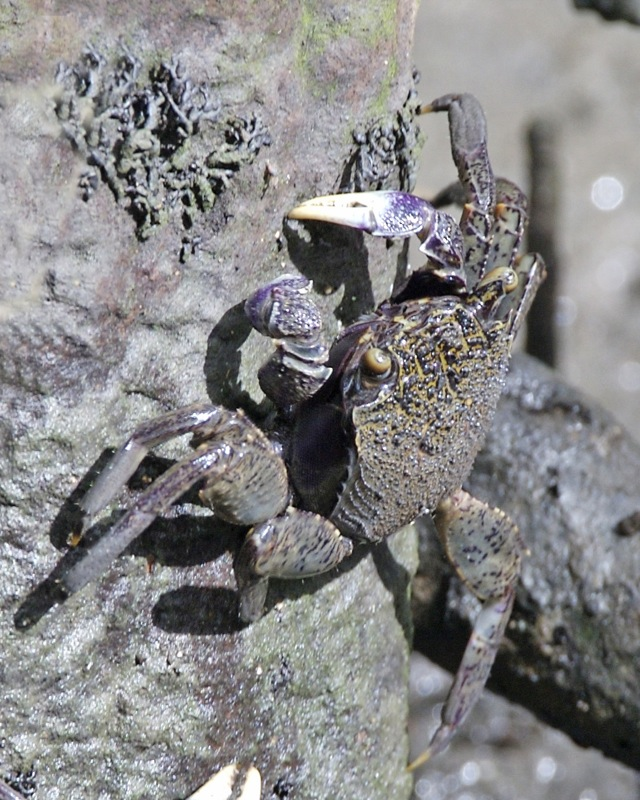
- Episesarma versicolor

Scientific classification
- Kingdom: Animalia
- Phylum: Arthropoda
- Clade: Pancrustacea
- Class: Malacostraca
- Order: Decapoda
- Suborder: Pleocyemata
- Infraorder: Brachyura
- Family: Sesarmidae
- Genus: Episesarma de Man, 1895

= Episesarma =

Genus of crustaceans

Episesarma sp. (video clip)

Episesarma is a genus of swimming crab species in the family Sesarmidae. The name "Episesarma" is derived from the Greek prefix "epi-" meaning "upon" or "on," indicating their habitat preference for areas such as mangrove roots or other surfaces within coastal ecosystems. "Episesarma" refers to crabs that are often found on or upon various surfaces in mangrove habitats.

== Species ==
- Episesarma chentongense (Serène & Soh, 1967)
- Episesarma crebrestriatum (Tesch, 1917)
- Episesarma lafondii (Hombron & Jacquinot, 1846)
- Episesarma mederi (H. Milne Edwards, 1853)
- Episesarma palawanense (Rathbun, 1914)
- Episesarma singaporense (Tweedie, 1936)
- Episesarma versicolor (Tweedie, 1940)

== Use in food ==
In Thailand, vinegar crab species such as Episesarma mederi, Episesarma versicolor, and Episesarma singaporense, as well as Sesarma eumolpe, are used as ingredients in som tam.
