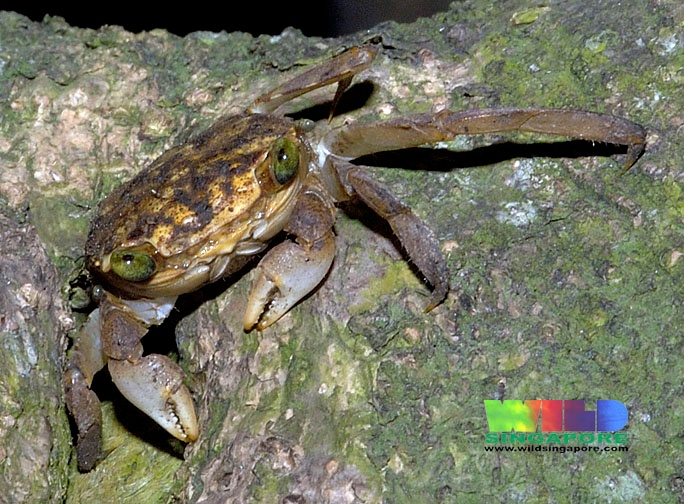
- Image of mangrove crab, selatium brockii.

Scientific classification
- Kingdom: Animalia
- Phylum: Arthropoda
- Class: Malacostraca
- Order: Decapoda
- Suborder: Pleocyemata
- Infraorder: Brachyura
- Family: Sesarmidae
- Genus: Selatium; Serène & Soh, 1970

Type species
- Sesarma brockii De Man, 1887

Species
- Sesarma brockii; Sesarma elongatum

= Selatium =

Genus of crabs

Selatium is a genus of crabs in the family Sesarmidae.

== Description ==
Selatium, or mangrove crabs, grow to around 2 cm - 2.5 cm in size, and have a distinct patterning on their dorsal side. Their legs and carapace display a striped pattern. The carapace itself is flat and square-shaped. It is wider than it is long and has deep grooves along the surface that separate each region. A large, sharp tooth is present on the carapace near the eyes. Selatium morphology also consists of chelipeds, or the front pair of extremities that attach to large claws or fingers. The tips of their chelipeds are cupped to facilitate feeding on algae and have sharp edges used for cutting. This species does not exhibit sexual size dimorphism, however, on the dorsal side of their claw, males have a row of small, narrow teeth, while females have tubercles. Mangrove crabs also have four other pairs of legs used for movement. Their legs have long propodi (second most distal segment) and short dactyli (most distal segment). On the underside of the carapace lies the abdomen which is triangular in shape with a rounded telson.

== Distribution, habitat, lifestyle ==
Mangrove crabs are most commonly found in the Indo-Pacific ranging from northern Australia to India and the eastern coast of Africa. They tend to live within the sandbank regions of mangroves. Known to climb trees instead of burrowing, they can be found between 1.5m to 3.0m from the ground, usually residing in hollow trees and holes in tree trunks during the day. Sometimes they can be found hiding under fallen tree bark or other organic matter. Selatium are nocturnal to reduce the risk of predation and avoid desiccation. At night, they feed on algae that grows on the lower portion of tree trunks.

== Diet ==
Selatium primarily feed on algae, however, they are opportunistic omnivores and at times will feed on vegetation or insects. Rotting leaves are important supplemental sources of nutrients for mangrove crabs. Selatium will occasionally hunt prey with higher protein contents to obtain missing nutrients such as nitrogen. When feeding, mangrove crabs will use their chelipeds to slice food into smaller fragments which they then grind down by the mandibles and gastric mill in their abdomen.

== Sociality ==
Mangrove crabs often partake in intraspecific competition for limited resources such as food, habitat space, and mates. During the breeding season, crabs will fight any other male, regardless of size in order to mate with their chosen female. Fights consist of a series of lunges and jabs with the crab's chelae. Crabs have been found to form clusters of both males and females, using density as a way to avoid predation. Within these clusters, the largest males patrol the area for predators while the smaller males and females inhabit the surrounding area. Mangrove crabs are not known to travel far in search of food or mating opportunities.

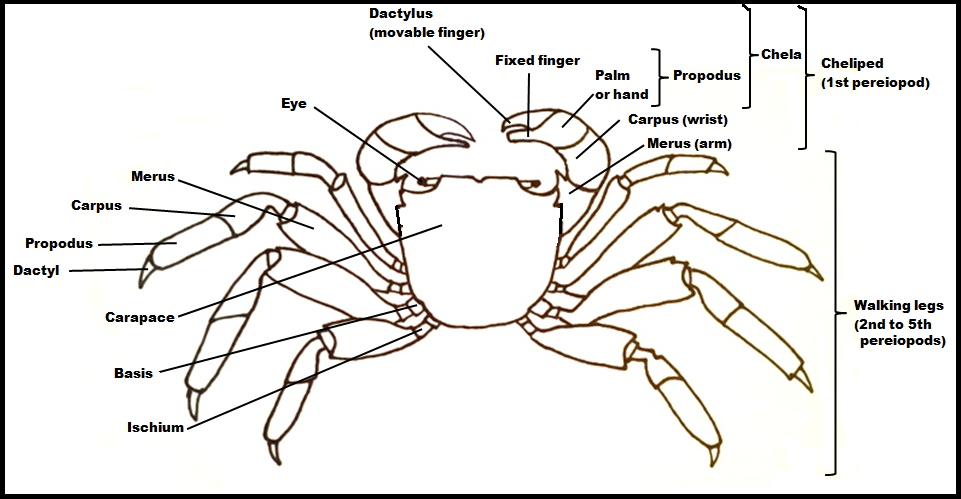
Dorsal anatomy of a mangrove crab

== Life cycle and reproduction ==
Following fertilization, female crabs carry eggs on their abdomen during their early stages of development. When they hatch, the eggs are released into the water where they will undergo five stages of juvenile development, four zoeal stages and 1 megalopa stage. During all zoeal stages, the larvae live in brackish waters. During these stages, the crabs use appendages stemming from the thorax to swim and will also have a large dorsal spine. Crabs in the megalopa stage also live in brackish waters, but here they have a segmented abdomen, meaning their legs will no longer stem from the abdominal area. Because of this, they have an unsegmented cephalothorax in which the legs will stem from. In this stage the eyes and antennae will form. After the megalopa stage, mangrove crabs have reached adulthood. Once adults, they will molt multiple times in order to reach their adult size.
