= Parasesarma =

Scientific classification
- Kingdom: Animalia
- Phylum: Arthropoda
- Class: Malacostraca
- Order: Decapoda
- Suborder: Pleocyemata
- Infraorder: Brachyura
- Family: Sesarmidae
- Genus: Parasesarma; De Man, 1895

Type species
- Cancer quadratus Fabricius, 1798

Genus of crustaceans

Parasesarma is a genus of grapsaoid crabs.

The following species are assigned to this genus:

- Parasesarma affine (De Haan, 1837)
- Parasesarma anambas Yeo, Rahayu & Ng, 2004
- Parasesarma asperum (Heller, 1865)
- Parasesarma austrawati Shahdadi, Davie & Schubart, 2019
- Parasesarma batavianum (De Man, 1890)
- Parasesarma bengalense (Davie, 2003)
- Parasesarma bidens (De Haan, 1835)
- Parasesarma brevicristatum (Campbell, 1967)
- Parasesarma calypso (De Man, 1895)
- Parasesarma capensis Fratini, Cannicci & Innocenti in Fratini, Cannicci, Porri & Innocenti, 2019
- Parasesarma carolinense Rathbun, 1907
- Parasesarma catenatum (Ortmann, 1897)
- Parasesarma charis Rahayu & Ng, 2005
- Parasesarma chiahsiang Shih, Hsu & Li, 2023
- Parasesarma continentale Shih, Hsu & Li, 2023
- Parasesarma corallicum Ng, Davie & Li, 2016
- Parasesarma cricotum (Rahayu & Davie, 2002)
- Parasesarma darwinense (Campbell, 1967)
- Parasesarma daviei Shahdadi, Schubart & Mendoza, 2021
- Parasesarma dumacense (Rathbun, 1914)
- Parasesarma ellenae (Pretzmann, 1968)
- Parasesarma erythodactylum (Hess, 1865)
- Parasesarma eumolpe (De Man, 1895)
- Parasesarma exquisitum (Dai & Song, 1986)
- Parasesarma gemmatum Li, Shih & Ng, 2019
- Parasesarma guttatum (A Milne-Edwards, 1869)
- Parasesarma hartogi Davie & Pabriks, 2010
- Parasesarma haswelli (De Man, 1887)
- Parasesarma holthuisi (Davie, 2010)
- Parasesarma indiarum (Tweedie, 1940)
- Parasesarma insulare Shih, Hsu & Li, 2023
- Parasesarma kuekenthali (De Man, 1902)
- Parasesarma lanchesteri (Tweedie, 1936)
- Parasesarma lepidum (Tweedie, 1950)
- Parasesarma lividum (A Milne-Edwards, 1869)
- Parasesarma longicristatum (Campbell, 1967)
- Parasesarma luomi Serène, 1982
- Parasesarma maipoense (Soh, 1978)
- Parasesarma melissa (De Man, 1888)
- Parasesarma messa (Campbell, 1967)
- Parasesarma onychophorum (De Man, 1895)
- Parasesarma otiense Shahdadi, Hosie, Hara & Chan, 2025
- Parasesarma palauense Takeda, 1971
- Parasesarma pangauranense (Rathbun, 1914)
- Parasesarma peninsulare Shahdadi, Ng & Schubart, 2018
- Parasesarma persicum Naderloo & Schubart, 2010
- Parasesarma pictum (De Haan, 1835)
- Parasesarma plicatum (Latreille, 1803)
- Parasesarma prashadi (Chopra & Das, 1937)
- Parasesarma rahayuae Shahdadi, Schubart & Mendoza, 2023
- Parasesarma raouli Rahayu & Ng, 2009
- Parasesarma rutilimanum (Tweedie, 1936)
- Parasesarma samawati (Gillikin & Schubart, 2004)
- Parasesarma sanguimanus Li, Shih & Ng, 2019
- Parasesarma semperi (Bürger, 1893)
- Parasesarma sigillatum (Tweedie, 1950)
- Parasesarma tripectinis (Shen, 1940)
- Parasesarma tuerkayi (Shahdadi, Davie & Schubart, 2017)
- Parasesarma ungulata (H. Milne Edwards, 1853)
