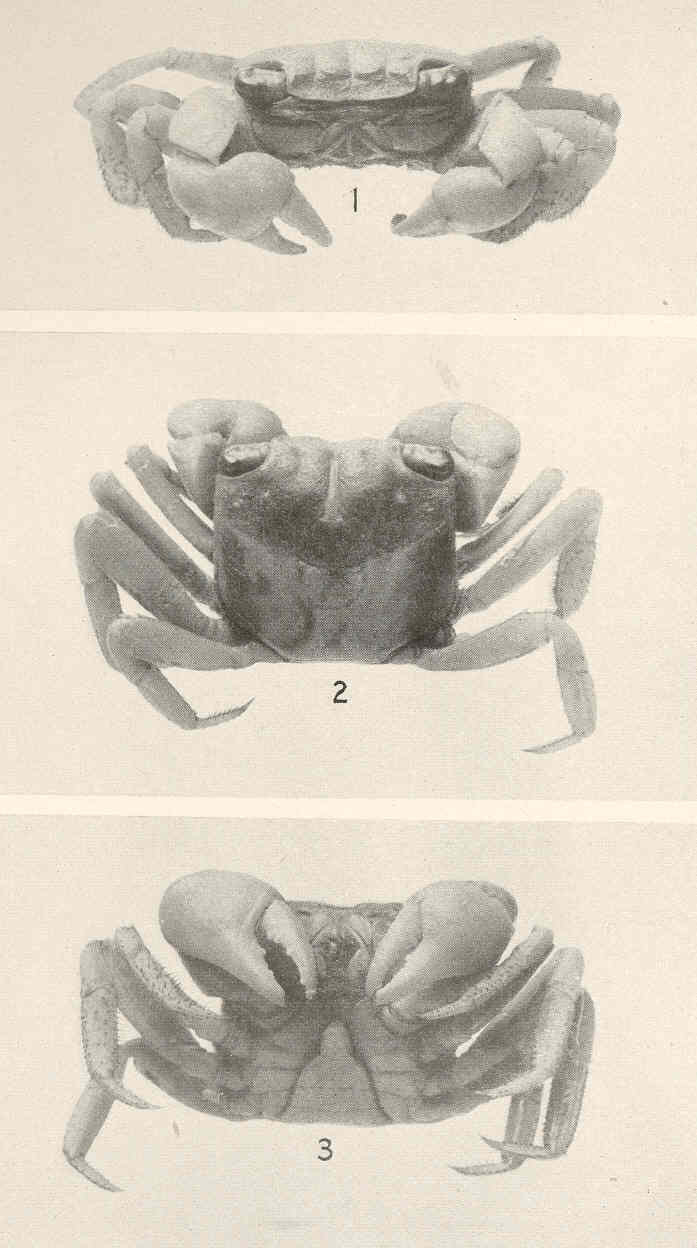
- Armases americanum

Scientific classification
- Kingdom: Animalia
- Phylum: Arthropoda
- Class: Malacostraca
- Order: Decapoda
- Suborder: Pleocyemata
- Infraorder: Brachyura
- Family: Sesarmidae
- Genus: Armases; Abele, 1992

= Armases =

Genus of crabs

Armases is a genus of true crabs in the family Sesarmidae. There are about 13 described species in Armases.

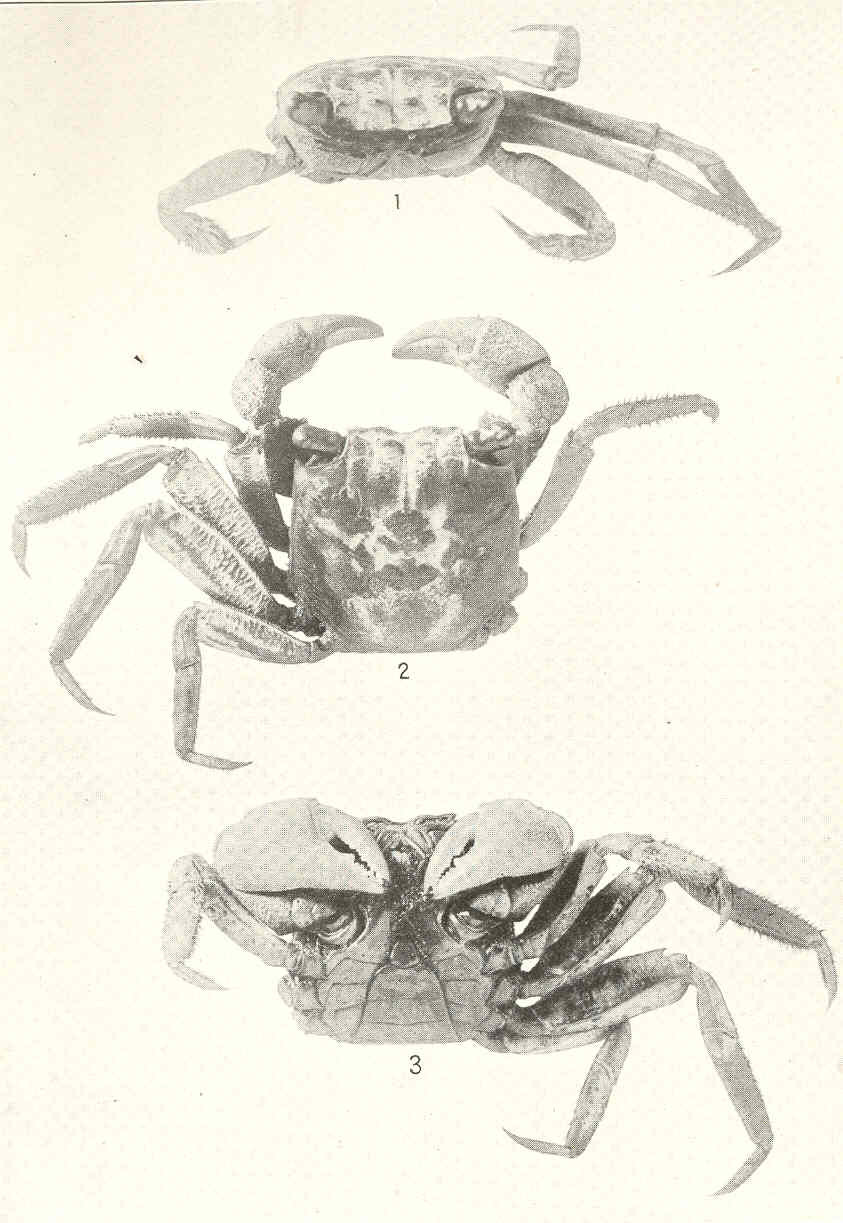
Armases roberti

== Species ==
These 13 species belong to the genus Armases:

- Armases americanum (Saussure, 1858)
- Armases angustipes (Dana, 1852)
- Armases angustum (Smith, 1870)
- Armases benedicti (M. J. Rathbun, 1897)
- Armases cinereum (Bosc, 1802) (squareback marsh crab)
- Armases elegans (Herklots, 1851)
- Armases gorei (Abele, 1981)
- Armases magdalenense (Rathbun, 1918)
- Armases miersii (M. J. Rathbun, 1897)
- Armases occidentale (Smith, 1870)
- Armases ricordi (H. Milne Edwards, 1853)
- Armases roberti (H.Milne Edwards, 1853)
- Armases rubripes (Rathbun, 1897)
