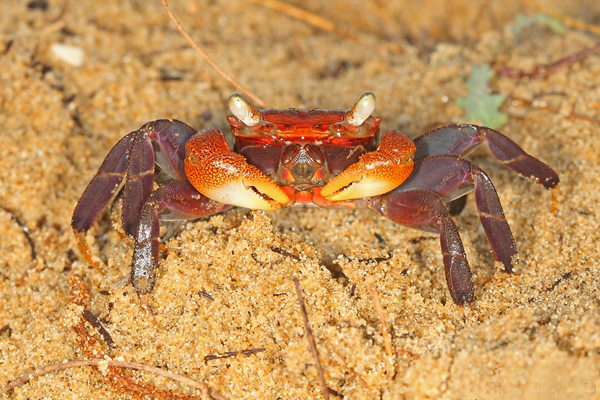
- Sesarma quadratum

Scientific classification
- Kingdom: Animalia
- Phylum: Arthropoda
- Class: Malacostraca
- Order: Decapoda
- Suborder: Pleocyemata
- Infraorder: Brachyura
- Family: Sesarmidae
- Genus: Sesarma; Say, 1817

Species
- 18 + 1 cryptic species; see text

= Sesarma =

Genus of crabs

Sesarma is a genus of terrestrial crabs endemic to the Americas.

Many species within this genus live in mangroves. They have evolved to be fully terrestrial, which means they do not have to return to the sea even to spawn. Several species initially placed here are now placed in other genera of the Sesarmidae, and in some cases even elsewhere in the Grapsoidea.

Sesarma contains the following extant species:

- Sesarma abeokuta Schubart & Santl, 2014
- Sesarma aequatoriale Ortmann, 1894
- Sesarma ayatum Reimer & Diesel, 1998
- Sesarma bidentatum Benedict, 1892
- Sesarma cookei Hartnoll, 1971
- Sesarma crassipes Cano, 1889
- Sesarma curacaoense De Man, 1892
- Sesarma dolphinum Schubart & Diesel, 1998
- Sesarma fossarum Reimer, Diesel & Türkay, 1997
- Sesarma jarvisi Rathbun, 1913
- Sesarma meridies Schubart & Koller, 2005
- Sesarma rectum Randall, 1840
- Sesarma reticulatum (Say, 1817)
- Sesarma rhizophorae Rathbun, 1906
- Sesarma rubinofforum Abele, 1973
- Sesarma sulcatum Smith, 1870
- Sesarma verleyi Rathbun, 1914
- Sesarma windsor Türkay & Diesel, 1994

- Sesarma nr. reticulatum, undescribed species related to Sesarma reticulatum
