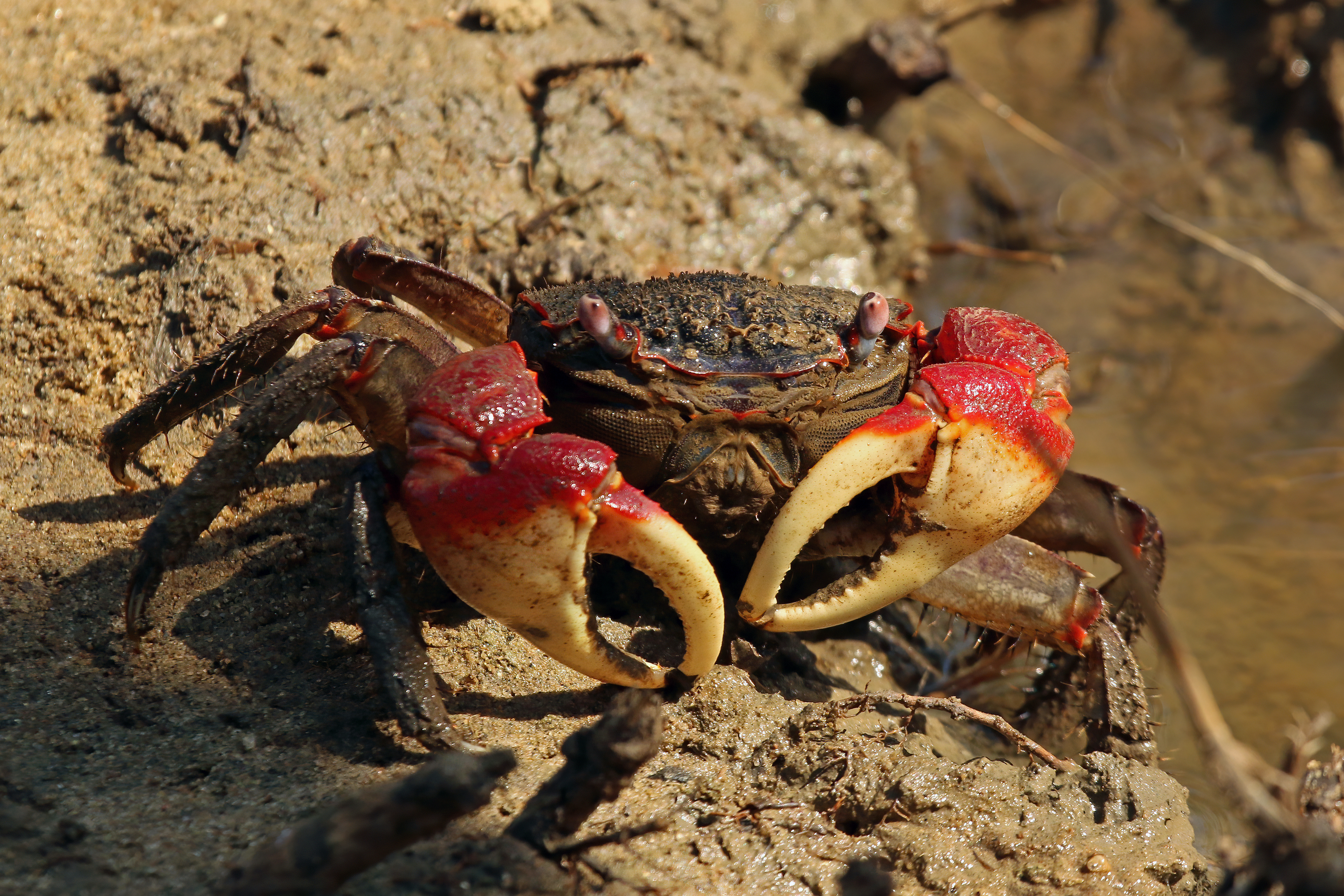
- Red mangrove crab (Neosarmatium meinerti)

Scientific classification
- Kingdom: Animalia
- Phylum: Arthropoda
- Clade: Pancrustacea
- Class: Malacostraca
- Order: Decapoda
- Suborder: Pleocyemata
- Infraorder: Brachyura
- Superfamily: Grapsoidea
- Family: Sesarmidae; Dana, 1851

= Sesarmidae =

Family of crabs

The Sesarmidae are a family of crabs, previously included in the Grapsidae by many authors. Several species, namely in Geosesarma, Metopaulias, and Sesarma, are true terrestrial crabs. They do not need to return to the sea even for breeding.

== Genera ==
The family contains these genera:

- Aratus H. Milne-Edwards, 1853
- Armases Abele, 1992
- Bresedium Serène & Soh, 1970
- Chiromantes Gistel, 1848
- Clistocoeloma H. Milne-Edwards, 1873
- Contusarma Schubart & Ng, 2020
- Cristarma Schubart & Ng, 2020
- Danarma Schubart & Ng, 2020
- Episesarma de Man, 1895
- Fasciarma Shahdadi & Schubart, 2017
- Geosesarma de Man, 1892
- Guinearma Shahdadi & Schubart, 2017
- Haberma Ng & Schubart, 2002
- Karstarma Davie & Ng, 2007
- Labuanium Serène & Soh, 1970
- Leptarma Shahdadi, Fratini & Schubart, 2020
- Manarma Schubart & Ng, 2020
- Metagrapsus H. Milne-Edwards, 1837
- Metasesarma H. Milne-Edwards, 1853
- Metopaulias Rathbun, 1896
- Miersarma Schubart & Ng, 2020
- Migmarma Schubart & Ng, 2020
- Muradium Serène & Soh, 1970
- Namlacium Serène & Soh, 1970
- Nanosesarma Tweedie, 1950
- Neosarmatium Serène & Soh, 1970
- Neosesarma Serène & Soh, 1970
- Orisarma Schubart & Ng, 2020
- Parasesarma de Man, 1895
- Perisesarma de Man, 1895
- Platychirarma Schubart & Ng, 2020
- Pseudosesarma Serène & Soh, 1970
- Sarmatium Dana, 1851
- Scandarma Schubart, Liu & Cuesta, 2003
- Selatium Serène & Soh, 1970
- Sesarma Say, 1817
- Sesarmoides Serène & Soh, 1970
- Sesarmops Serène & Soh, 1970
- Stelgistra Ng & Liu, 1999
- Tiomanum Serène & Soh, 1970
- Trapezarma Schubart & Ng, 2020

== Selected species ==
- Chiromantes eulimene – marsh crab (east coast of southern Africa)
- Chiromantes haematocheir – red-clawed crab; akategani (Japanese) dodukge (Korean)
- Parasesarma erythrodactyla – red-handed shore crab
- Orisarma dehaani – kurobenkeigani (Japanese)
- Parasesarma messa – maroon mangrove crab
- Parasesarma pictum – kakubenkeigani (Japanese)
- Tiomanium indicum – tioman crab
