= Tree crab =

Tree crab refers to various species of land crabs which are associated with trees, and may refer to:

- Aratus pisonii, the mangrove tree crab
- Birgus latro, the coconut crab
- Coenobita clypeatus, the Caribbean hermit crab
- Ghatiana splendida
- Haberma tingkok
- Kani maranjandu
- Perbrinckia scansor, the Sri Lanka tree crab
