= Mangrove crab =

Crabs that live on or among mangroves

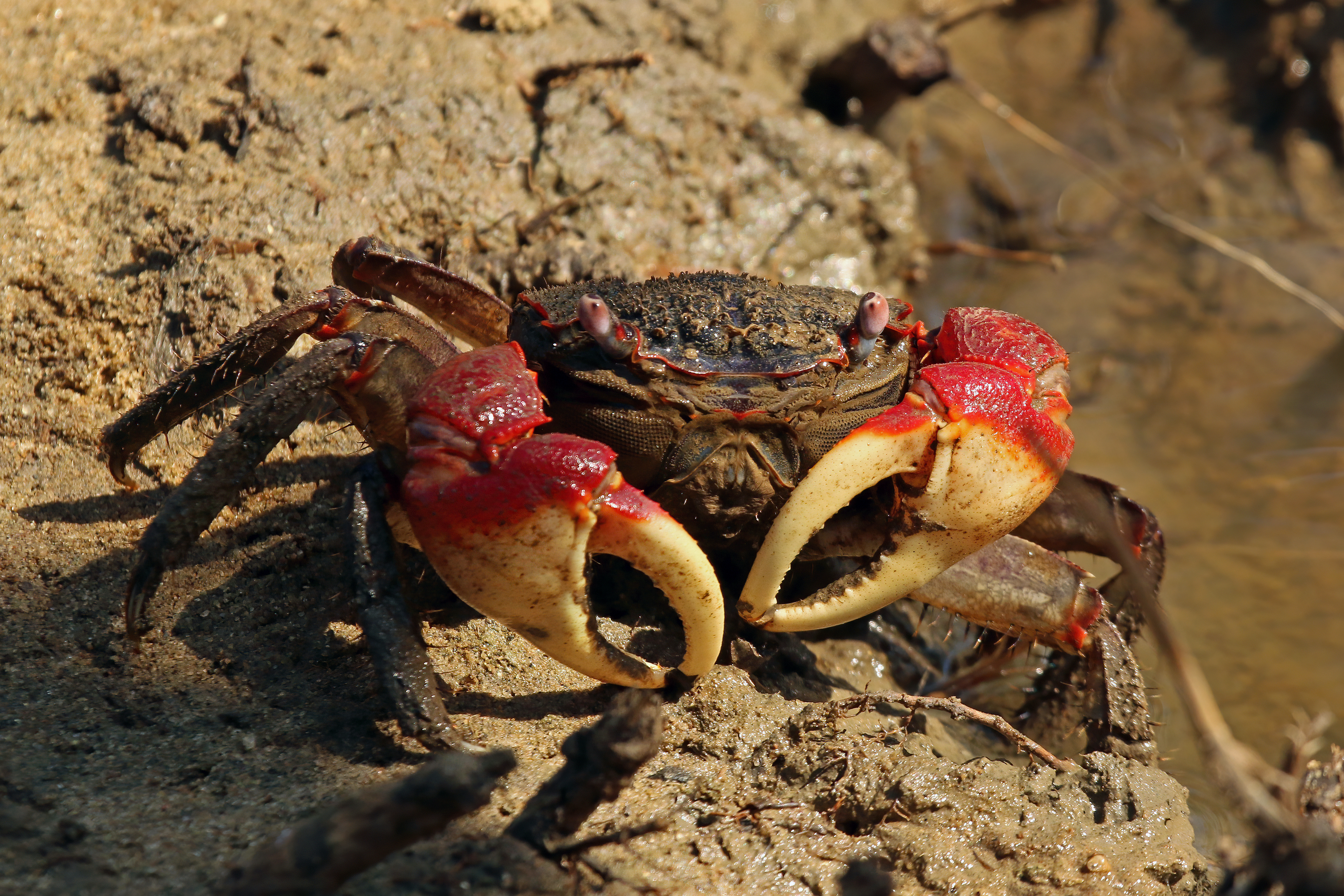
Red mangrove crab Neosarmatium meinerti

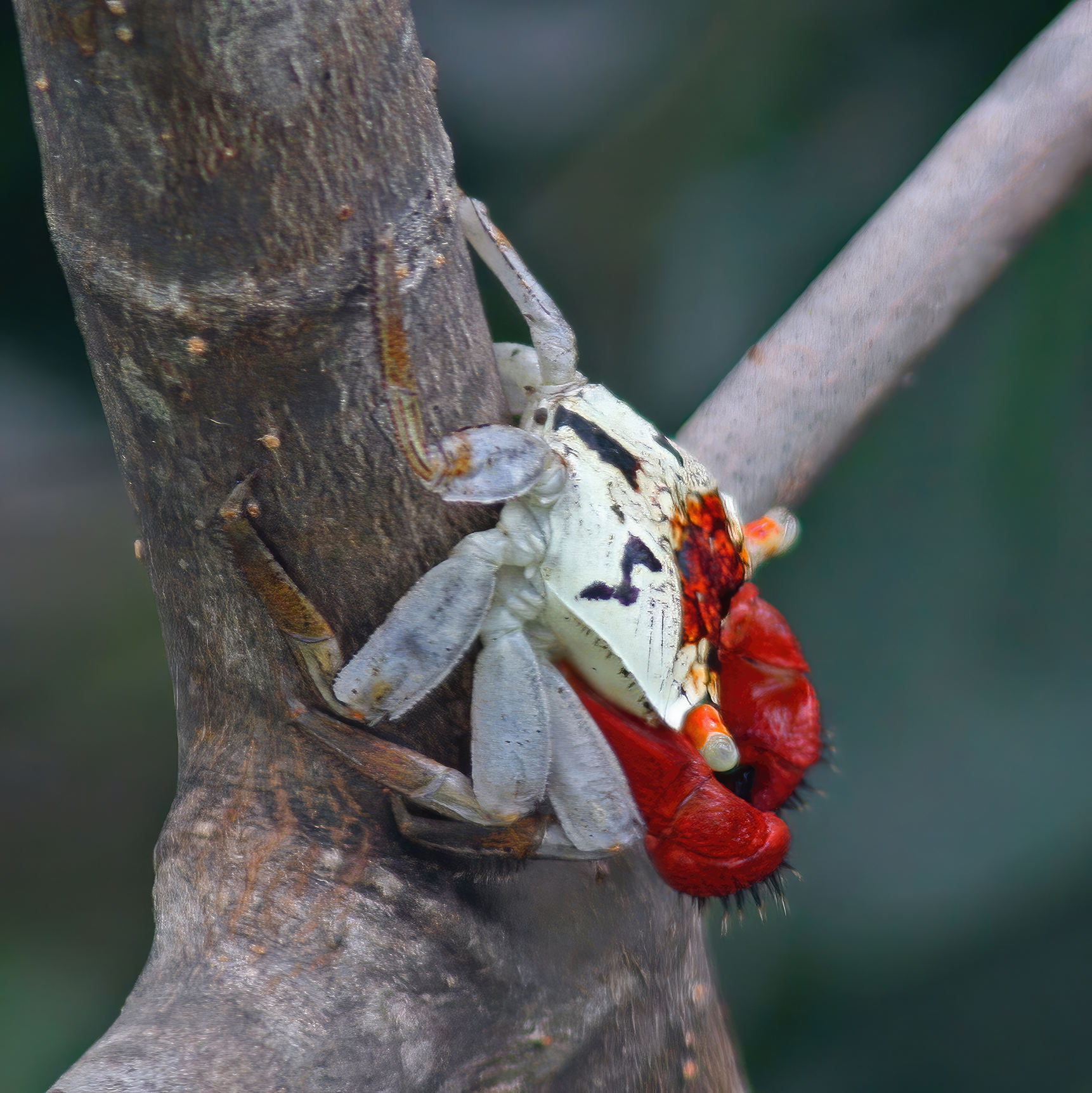
Mangrove crab

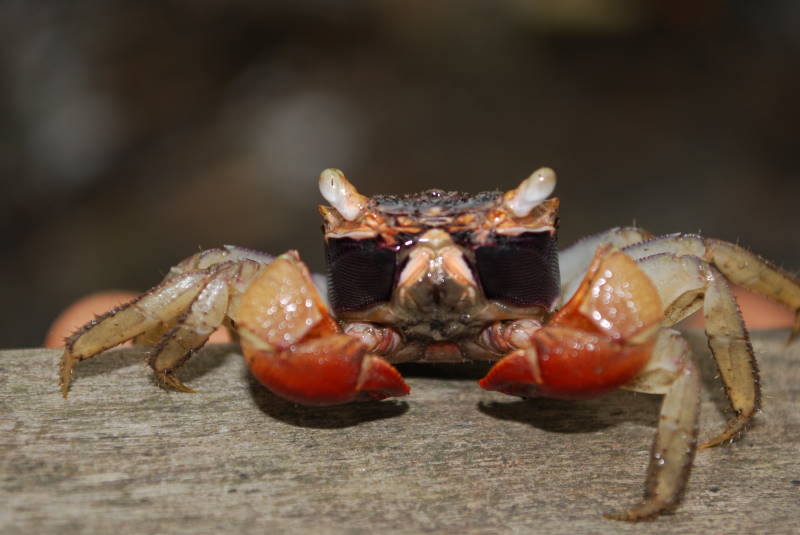
Mangrove crab

Mangrove crabs are crabs that live in and around mangroves. They belong to many different species and families and have been shown to be ecologically significant by burying and consuming leaf litter. By shredding and burrowing the leaf litter, mangrove crabs are able to prevent tidal export, which in turn helps retain the nutrients present in their habitats. This makes the nutrients around mangrove trees more available to other organisms, and thus they have an important role in maintaining ecological relationships and processes within their environments. Mangrove crabs have a variety of phylogenies because mangrove crab is an umbrella term that encompasses many species of crabs. Two of the most common families are sesarmid and fiddler crabs. They are omnivorous and are predated on by a variety of mammals and fish. They are distributed widely throughout the globe on coasts where mangroves are located. Mangrove crabs have wide variety of ecological and biogeochemical impacts due to the biofilms that live in symbiosis with them as well as their burrowing habits. Like many other crustaceans, they are also a human food source and have been impacted by humans as well as climate change.

== Species and distribution ==
Current estimates place the number of mangrove crab species at 481 in 6 different families, with new species being discovered frequently. Mangrove crabs primarily live in the Indo-West Pacific region in mudflats along tropical coasts. The largest habitats for mangrove crabs are in Southeast Asia, South America, and Northern Australia. The distribution of mangrove crabs throughout these regions is often marked by horizontal and vertical zonation patterns, due to their impacts on factors of the mangrove habitats such as oxygen depth into the soil and organic matter decomposition. Their role as propagule predators, or consumers of reproductive units of plants, is also critical in the maintenance of the environments in which they reside in through the broad impacts they have onto the vegetation structure and regeneration. As their name suggests, they are primarily found among mangrove tree forests and form symbiotic relationships with the trees, restricting their habitat to where the trees can grow.

=== Phylogeny ===
A variety of different species are what makeup the umbrella term of mangrove crabs. The two main crabs that typically dominate mangrove ecosystems are the sesarmid (Grapsidae) and fiddler crabs (Ocypodidae). The main difference between the two crab groups is their foraging habits. The two typical microfauna also have different perturbation effects on the environment's soil and organic matter due to differences in burrow morphology and interactions with the microbial organisms around them. Litter ingested by sesarmid crabs forms fragmented organic material that helps stimulate microbial respiration, in contrast fiddler crabs remove reactive organic carbon. Mangrove crabs are a part of the Animalia kingdom and are put into the Arthropoda phylum, Malacostraca class, and Decapoda order. Mangrove crabs can be classified into six different families: Camptandriidae, Dotillidae, Macrophthalmidae, Ocypodidae, Sesarmidae, and Oziidae.

=== Types of mangrove crabs ===
- Sesarmid crabs
- Fiddler crabs
- Aratus pisonii, Americas
- Haberma, genus of small mangrove crabs, Indo-Pacific, including:
  - Haberma tingkok, Hong Kong
- Metopograpsus messor, Indo-Pacific
- Metopograpsus thukuhar, Indo-Pacific
- Neosarmatium meinerti, Indo-Pacific
- Neosarmatium smithi, Indo-Pacific
- Parasesarma leptosoma, western Indian Ocean
- Perisesarma, genus with 23 species, primarily Indo-Pacific, with two West African species, including:
  - Perisesarma bidens, Indo-Pacific
  - Perisesarma guttatum, western Indian Ocean
- Scylla serrata, Indo-Pacific
- Scylla tranquebarica, Indo-Pacific
- Sesarma, genus with close to 20 species, many of which live in mangroves, Americas, Indo-Pacific
- Ucides cordatus, western Atlantic Ocean

== Ecology and biogeochemistry ==
=== Diet and predators ===
When young, mangrove crabs get most of their nutrients from polychaete worms and a multitude of microorganisms found living in the sediments and leaves of their environment. As they grow older mangrove crabs are generally detritivores with their diet consisting of already dead organic material. Mangrove crabs consume a large amount of plant material but are primarily omnivorous. In the mangrove swamp this includes dead leaves and corpses of other crustaceans, even that of their own species. In some cases, mangrove crabs may also eat fresh mangrove leaves. Mangrove crabs are predated on by wading birds, fish, sharks, monkeys, hawks, and raccoons. The larvae of mangrove crabs is a major source of food for juvenile fish in waterways near the crabs. Adult mangrove crabs are food for the crab plover among other protected species. To protect themselves the crabs can climb trees. However, the mangrove crab has also been known to jump off of trees in order to escape avian predation. Ultimately, this puts the species more at risk for fish predation and thus, the mangrove crab proves to be vulnerable whether they are up in the trees or residing near the water. Their ability to move around within the mangrove tree habitat does show a sense of adaptability, which is not present in many other crustacean species, besides notably hermit crabs.

=== Habitat and ecosystem engineering ===
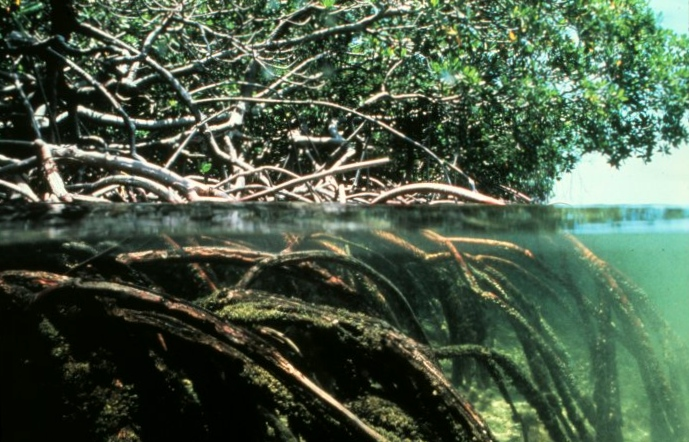
A mangrove

Mangrove crabs often construct and inhabit burrows in mangrove sediment, preventing factors such as loss of nutrients within their ecosystem while simultaneously promoting decomposition. These burrows aid them in enduring the extremes that can be found in mangroves at high and low tide, allowing them to maintain more constant and ideal temperatures and oxygen levels. These constants can additionally aid other small benthic fauna, like polychaetes and juvenile crabs. Mangrove crabs may plug their burrows at intervals determined by their circadian rhythms, or they may leave them open. The variety in structures and maintenance of these burrows may lead to a variety of different impacts on mangrove sediments, such as increasing or decreasing erodibility. Fiddler crabs generally have very simple 10–40 cm "J-shaped" burrows, while sesarmid crabs that burrow often create complex, branching burrows that can reach over 100 cm in depth. Both types of crab significantly increase the surface area of the sediment and water/air interface to similar extents when scaled for relative abundance. These burrows also result in significant burial and downward travel of mangrove leaves. The burrowing dynamics of mangrove crabs dramatically impacts ecosystems, these dynamics were impacted by both abiotic factors like soil composition, and biotic factors like root depth and tree density. With all of these factors, both species of mangrove crabs have been known as environmental "engineers" due to their adjustments on the availability of resources, modifications to their habitats, and complexity in behaviors.

Mangrove crabs modify particle size, nutrient availability, particle distribution, redox reactions, and organic matter. Mangrove crabs also influence sediment biogeochemistry by altering bacterial community composition and increasing carbon and nutrient cycling through burrowing and associated changes in sediment conditions. Aeration allows for additional microbial decomposition, oxidation of iron, and reduction of sulfur by anaerobic microbes. This leads to extremely high pyrite concentrations in mangrove soils, and removal of sulfides that negatively impact plant growth. Surface soils are similarly impacted when mixed by mangrove crab legs.

Depending on its nitrogen content, burial of detritus in crab burrows can stimulate microbial growth and activity and lead to variation in mangrove soils' carbon dioxide efflux, ammonium content, and nitrate content.

The feces of mangrove crabs may help form a coprophagous food chain which contributes to mangrove secondary production.

=== Biofilms ===
Biofilm endosymbiosis occurs on the gills of some mangrove crabs, namely Aratus pisonii and Minuca rapax. Each species of these mangrove crabs likely has distinct bacterial compositions. These microbial biofilms are locations of nitrogen transformation, particularly nitrogen fixation. This nitrogen fixation has even been found to be enriched within the crab's intestines and sediments, in addition to sulfur associated compounds. These compounds are thought to help the species degrade organic compounds through their roles as terminal electron acceptors in the processes which help the organism produce energy. Bacteria like Cyanobacteria, Alphaproteobacteria, Actinobacteria, and Bacteroidota have been found on mangrove crab carapaces. However, one bacterium that is found within the gills of mangrove crabs regardless of geological location is Illumatobacter which helps the species convert ammonia to amino acids while additionally helping avoid negative side effects of their environment such as toxicity from sulfur compounds and influxes of carbon monoxide. The animal-microbe associations themselves serve as a net nitrogen sink, with nitrogen fixation exceeding nitrogen losses, and thus a source of ammonium and dissolved nitrogen to the environment. Crab bioturbation also alters sediment redox conditions and microbial habitat structure, influencing carbon and nutrient cycling within sediment microbial communities. Another fact which further helps support the increased prevalence of N-fixation in mangrove crab habitats is the abundance of the stable N isotope in fiddler crab associated biofilms, due to the depletion of ^{15}N isotope. Its lower signature indicates a nutritional relationship between the crab species and the microbiota that reside on them. Ultimately, the importance of the biofilm may be dependent on if the crabs live primarily in burrows or outside burrows, in that crabs that live outside burrows may consume their nitrogen from microphytobenthos, while crabs that live inside their burrows may rely more on their associated microbes. All crab species however, can impact the spatial abundance of nitrogen within their environments, through the process of selective grazing and moving around within their habitats depending on mating season, predatory threats, and low tides.

== Human impacts ==
=== Climate change ===
Ideal mangrove crab habitats rely heavily on coastal depth and surface temperature. Climate change due to anthropogenic activities is likely to create fluctuations in these two factors, driving the mangrove crab habitats to higher latitudes. As a result, it is predicted that mangrove habitats will continually shrink for the majority of crab species. Changes in crab population density and distribution may also alter sediment biogeochemical processes, since reduced bioturbation can decrease oxygen penetration and slow carbon and nutrient cycling in mangrove soils. This shrinking of habitat space isolates crab communities and shrinks genetic diversity, making many species more vulnerable to extinction. The species distribution of the crabs will also be affected negatively, since their distribution is often contributed to land use, salinity, and abundance of predators. With the shrinking of habitats and changes in population diversity, the most important factor for preservation is the focus on small, interconnected mangrove sites which could act as a recruitment site of different kinds of organisms, including the mangrove crab population.

=== Crabbing ===
Like many other crustaceans, mangrove crabs have historically been caught, prepared and eaten by people all over the world. Crab meat can be prepared simply by boiling the crab either dead or alive until the shell turns from black to red. This practice may be threatened by human activities, however, as microplastics have been found to be abundantly common in the gills of mangrove crabs due to human pollution. This not only negatively affects the health of the crabs, but could affect the health of humans who consume them.

=== Land use change ===
Around 6,000 km^{2} of mangrove was deforested between 1996 and 2016, usually redeveloped for fish and shrimp aquaculture, rice cultivation, palm oil plantations, and sometimes urbanization. Diversity of mangrove crabs does not seem to be negatively affected in abandoned aquaculture plots, though logging has significant negative effects on mangrove crab diversity.

== See also ==
- Fiddler crab
- Sesarmid crabs
- Grapsidae
- Mangrove ecoregions
- Neosarmatium australiense
