= Perisesarma guttatum =

Red-claw mangrove crab

Scientific classification
- Kingdom: Animalia
- Phylum: Arthropoda
- Class: Malacostraca
- Order: Decapoda
- Suborder: Pleocyemata
- Infraorder: Brachyura
- Family: Sesarmidae
- Genus: Perisesarma
- Species: P. guttatum

Binomial name
- Perisesarma guttatum (Milne-Edwards, 1869)

Synonyms
- Chiromanthes guttatum (A. Milne Edwards, 1869); Sesarma guttatum A. Milne-Edwards, 1869

Species of crab

Perisesarma guttatum, the red-claw mangrove crab, is a crab species in the genus Perisesarma and the family Sesarmidae. It is distributed in coastal brackish water habitats of the western Indian Ocean.

== Description ==
Along with the other species within the genus Perisesarma, the red-claw mangrove crab has a relatively square-shaped carapace and a "tooth" protruding off the sides of it. The claw of the crab consists of a palm and dactylus. At the end of the dactylus are oval or circular shaped bumps called tubercles. The part leading up to the claws, the chelar carpus, also has pectinate crests on males within the genus. A pectinate crest is a ridge-like projection on the crab; these ridges line the chelar carpus side-by-side. Different species of Perisesarma vary in the amount of their tubercles in addition to the number of pectinate crests.

P. guttatum have 20 pectinate crests and 11 to 13 oval-shaped tubercles on top of their claws. Their claws are reddish in color with bright orange internal palms. The carapace is about 3 cm in length and between 1.5 and 2.2 cm in width on average in adults. At maturity, males display larger claws than females, showing sexual dimorphism.

P. samawati, a sympatric species, was confused for P. guttatum until more recently, though their morphologies are distinctly different. Unlike P. guttatum, P. Samawati only has 7 to 9 tubercles on the upper surface of their claws. The sizes of their bodies differs as well.

== Distribution ==
P. guttatum are mangrove inhabitants mostly located by Avicennia marina. The species inhabit these mangroves in east African coasts and Madagascar. Despite increases in pollution from sewage in these areas, the crabs tolerate and are even capable of using the excess nutrients, making them less helpful in measuring mangrove health.

== Ecology ==
The species use burrows and natural crevices made by Neosarmatium smithi to hide from predators and also for survival. P. guttatum are mainly herbivorous, eating dead plant material and other organic matter foraged from the estuarine or forest floor during low tides. Their diets therefore contribute to leaf turnover and the general removal of matter from the substratum.

== Reproduction and life history ==
Females begin to reach sexual maturity around 2 years old; adults then mate throughout the year, but a study suggests that breeding correlates with lunar phases. Females tend to release their larvae before spring tides, which occur during new and full moons. However, females cannot breed for two consecutive spring tides, which suggests this pattern is seen due to two breeding groups within one population.

During the early stages of life, planktonic larvae move offshore and are distributed with the help of ocean currents. They later return as megalopa larvae – the step in their development that comes after 5 planktonic life stages – and settle in the nearshore environments around where they were once born.
