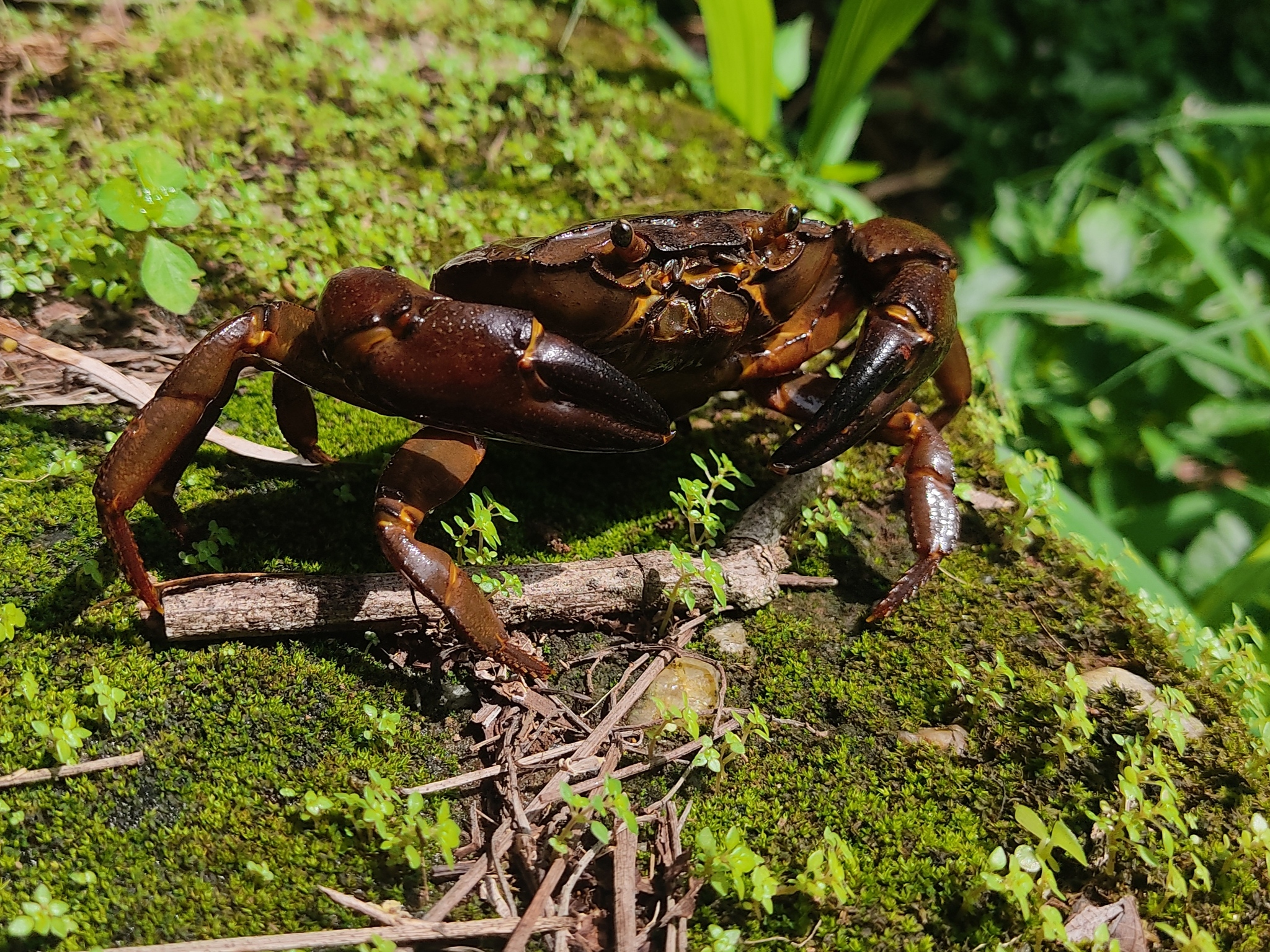
- From Kumplampoika, Pathanamthitta district, Kerala, India

Scientific classification
- Kingdom: Animalia
- Phylum: Arthropoda
- Class: Malacostraca
- Order: Decapoda
- Suborder: Pleocyemata
- Infraorder: Brachyura
- Family: Gecarcinucidae
- Genus: Barytelphusa
- Species: B. cunicularis

Binomial name
- Barytelphusa cunicularis (Westwood in Sykes, 1836)

Synonyms
- Barytelphusa jacquemontii Rathbun, 1905; Potamon (Potamonautes) jacquemontii Rathbun, 1905; Thelphusa cunicularis Westwood in Sykes, 1836

= Barytelphusa cunicularis =

Species of crustaceans

Barytelphusa cunicularis is a common species of freshwater crab found in India. It is distributed throughout the country from Himachal Pradesh in north to Kerala in south except north-east india.

== Description ==
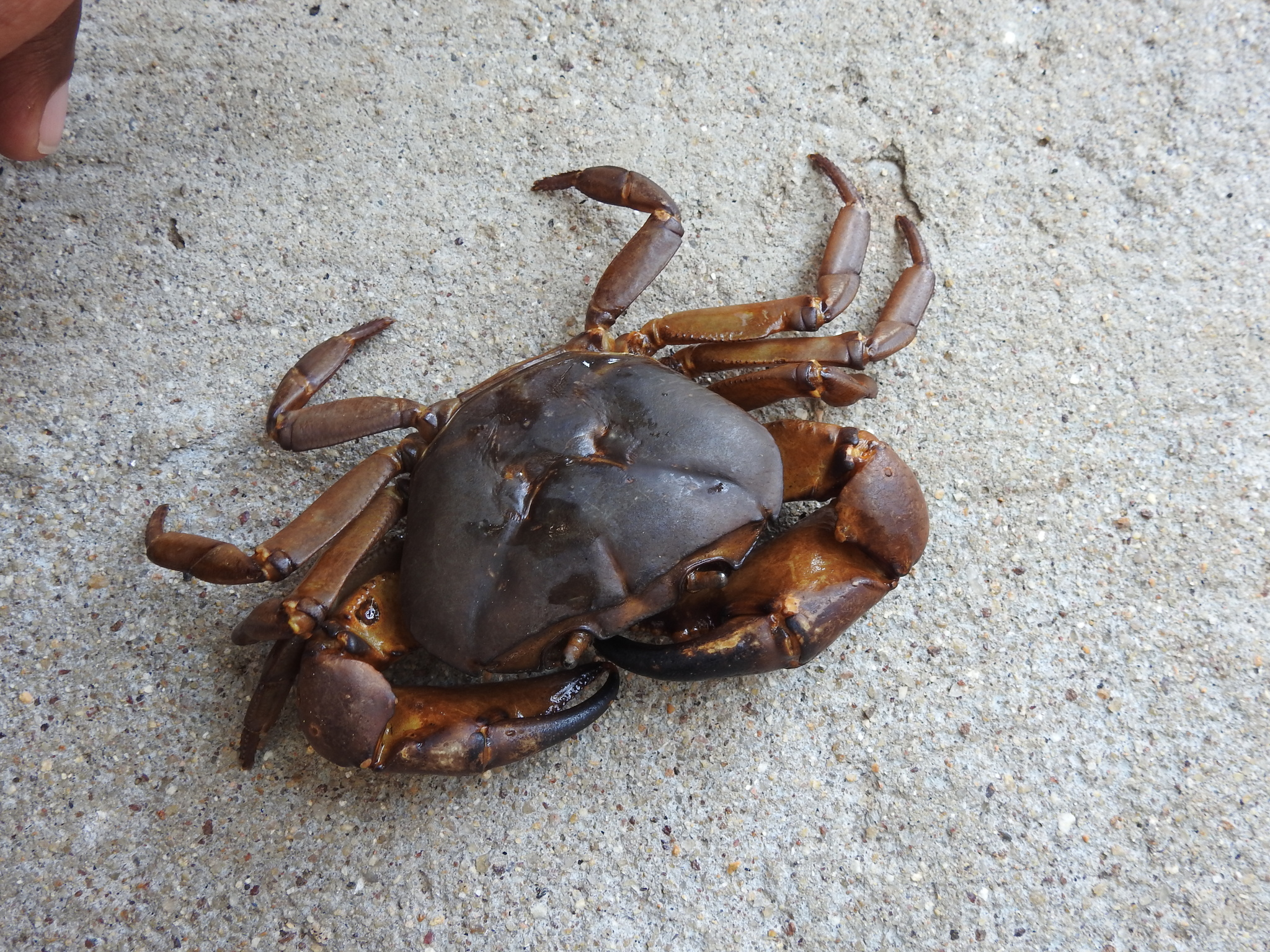
An individual from Tirunelveli, Tamil Nadu, India, showing top view of carapace.

The carapace is of a dark chestnut black color, and is nearly smooth. The claws are of the color of the shell, but the basal joint of the first and the whole of the other legs are much paler-colored, being of a dirty testaceous brown, with very numerous small transverse black marks.

== Ecology ==
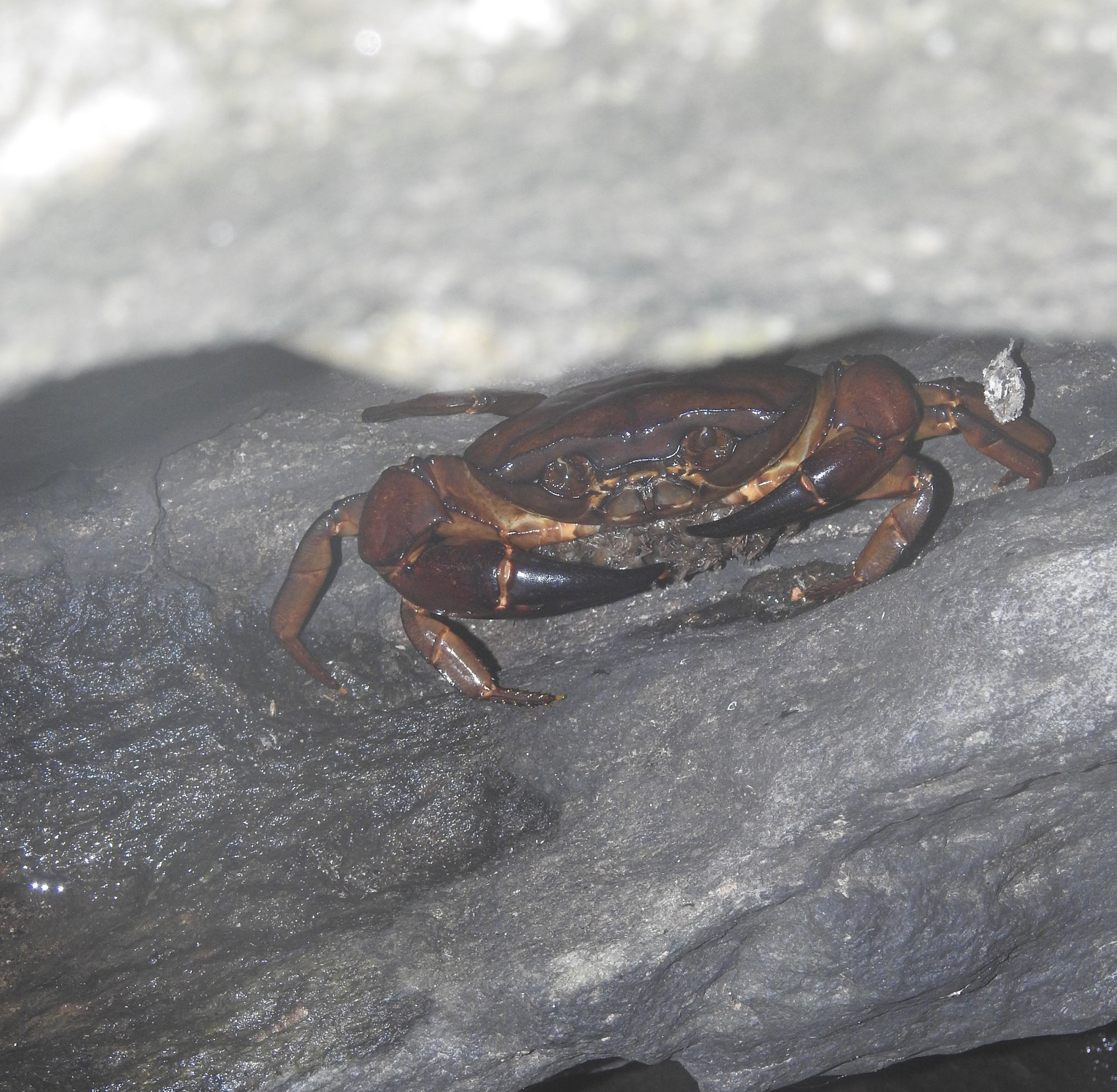
An individual with crablets in a rocky crevice in Kerala, India.

Barytelphusa cunicularis is nocturnal in nature, it has been observed in small pits at the banks of rivers, lakes or reservoirs. It is most commonly found inhabiting rocky crevices adjoining paddy fields, streams and rivulets. It builds borrows in a rectangular shape. Observed in the tributaries of the Godavari River in Nanded, where they built mostly in river beds where small pools with boulders and rocks were available. They were recorded in during late winter to summer season.(December to May).

Gut analysis of B. cunicularis showed that the species is mostly carnivorous but sometimes feeds on decaying plant matter.

In an laboratory with individuals of B. cunicularis in air pump aerated water, it was found that the crab is omnivorous, as it was fed with dried prawns, dead trash fish and rice flakes. The live wild specimens collected within the Godavari river were found to eat Melanoid tuberculata, Bellamya bengalensis, Bellamya dissimilis and Taberia lineate. During feed, the crab was able to break the shells of these small and slow gastropods into 3–4 pieces and drag out the soft body of the molluscs using its chelate legs and feed on it. It was partial feeding as the body parts of gastropods were found partially remaining inside the shell due to the inability of the crab to remove out the mollusc body completely from the shells. Meaning that B. cunicularis prefers to feed on the gastropods as a supplementary food.

At the edge of a pool in a seasonal streambed in Agumbe, Karnataka a crab was seen feeding on Pterocryptis wynaadensis, a species of catfish. It is unclear how the crab was able to catch such a large prey animal.

In Rangana Fort, There was an observation of a crab feeding on tadpoles of Amboli leaping frog in a rocky crevice. Another freshwater crab in India, Ghatiana atropurpurea was also found in a pond filled with tadpoles. The occurrence of this observation and G.atropurpurea feeding on tadpoles, poses that B.cunicularis has a possible tendency to hunt tadpoles along with other freshwater crabs in India.

== Cultivation and consumption by humans ==
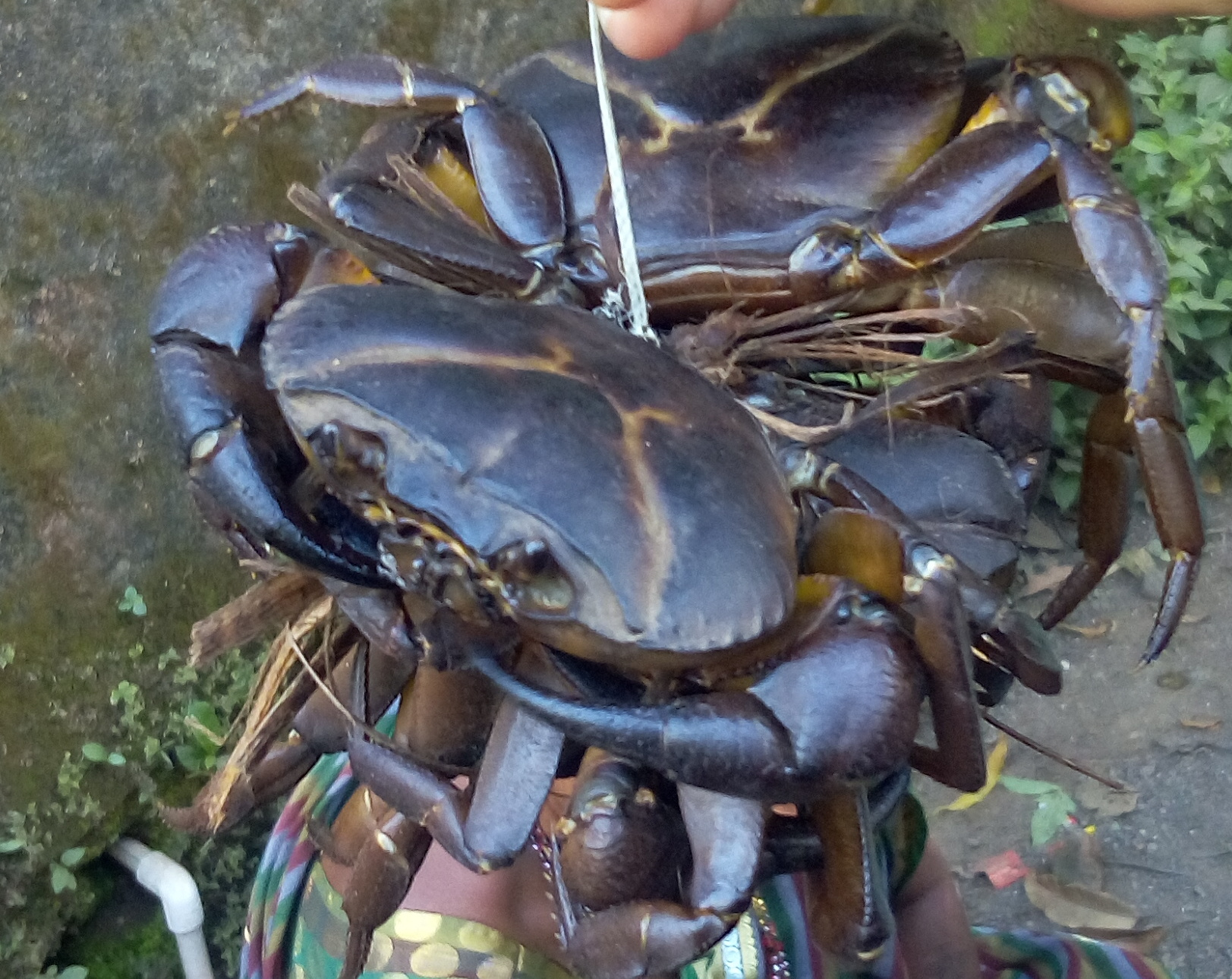
Barytelphusa cunicularis caught for consumption from Kurla, Mumbai. The town is named after the crab, which is known locally as "Kurli".

Barytelphusa cunicularis along with Barusa guerini are consumed by humans, mostly in Maharashtra. B.cunicularis is preferred as Barusa guerini is smaller and less body mass is present and so it is unfit for cooking. The crabs are collected by certain crab catching communities or experts belonging to certain castes and tribes. Then they are sold in the weekly markets. They are not exhibited in special crab markets but rather in fish markets. The species is hardy to withstand without water in moist and can airbreath and remain live without food for a few days. As a result, these crabs are easy to maintain and are in high demand in local markets.

The carapace is removed and the crab is crushed used a grinder and an mixer. The body extract is used to make a special 'crab curry', which is prepared using local condiments. The residue of the carapace is discarded. Few consumers also reported that consumption of the species is useful in the prevention and treatment of joint pains and sexual impotency problems like erectile deficiency.

For cultivation, an experiment was conducted to study the growth and survival of the crab, it was fed with different feeds. It was seen that the crabs preferred a mix diet of clams and fish in captivity.

Oil extracted from dried meat of Barytelphusa cunicularis was found to have cholesterol, glycerol and Vitamin A. It is a good source of Vitamin A, but excessive use must be avoided as it contains cholesterol to some extent. The oil has a good saponification value and the free fatty acid was found to be at 34.78 mg while the peroxide value of the oil is less i.e. 4.3mEq/Kg. The oil is insoluble in polar solvents like methanol and ethanol, hence hydrogen bonding or polar interactions are ruled out. While, it is soluble in non-polar solvents like hexane, carbon tetrachloride and indicating maximum covalent nature of compound. It is a source of fat though it does not contain any protein. The oil can also not be used as an antimicrobial agent as tests were proven to be negative.

== Reproduction ==
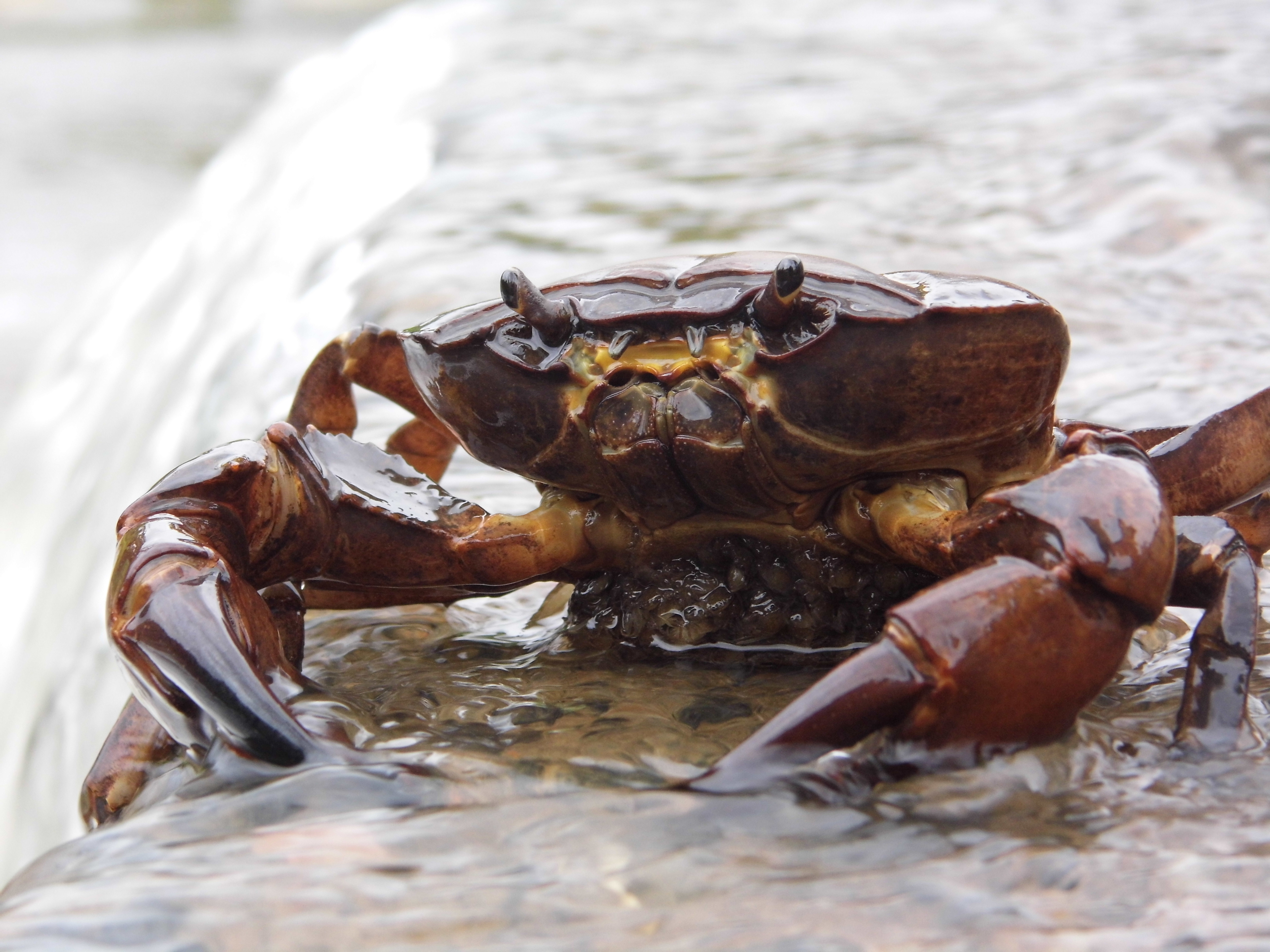
Closeup of an individual which has crablets from Arignar Anna Zoological Park, Chennai.

Barytelphusa cunicularis is dioecious. The spawning season starts in the month of June and ends in September, the females are more in number then the males in the breeding period (June to September). A male B.cunicularis enters puberty upon attaining a carapace with a width about 40mm, and females when with a width of 44mm.The reproductive activity of the species is dependent on rainfall. The ripening of the gonads starts during March and up till May. By June, most of the gonads attain full maturity and spawning starts. The spawning season as stated before ends in September and the gonads enter an quiescent period.

Intersexuality is also present in B.cunicularis. Intersexual individuals had male like abdomen with female gonopods and gonopores. The reason behind the presence of intersex individuals in B.cunicularis is still unknown and detailed study is needed to find out the possible factors for the occurrence the phenomena.

== Pollution and diseases ==
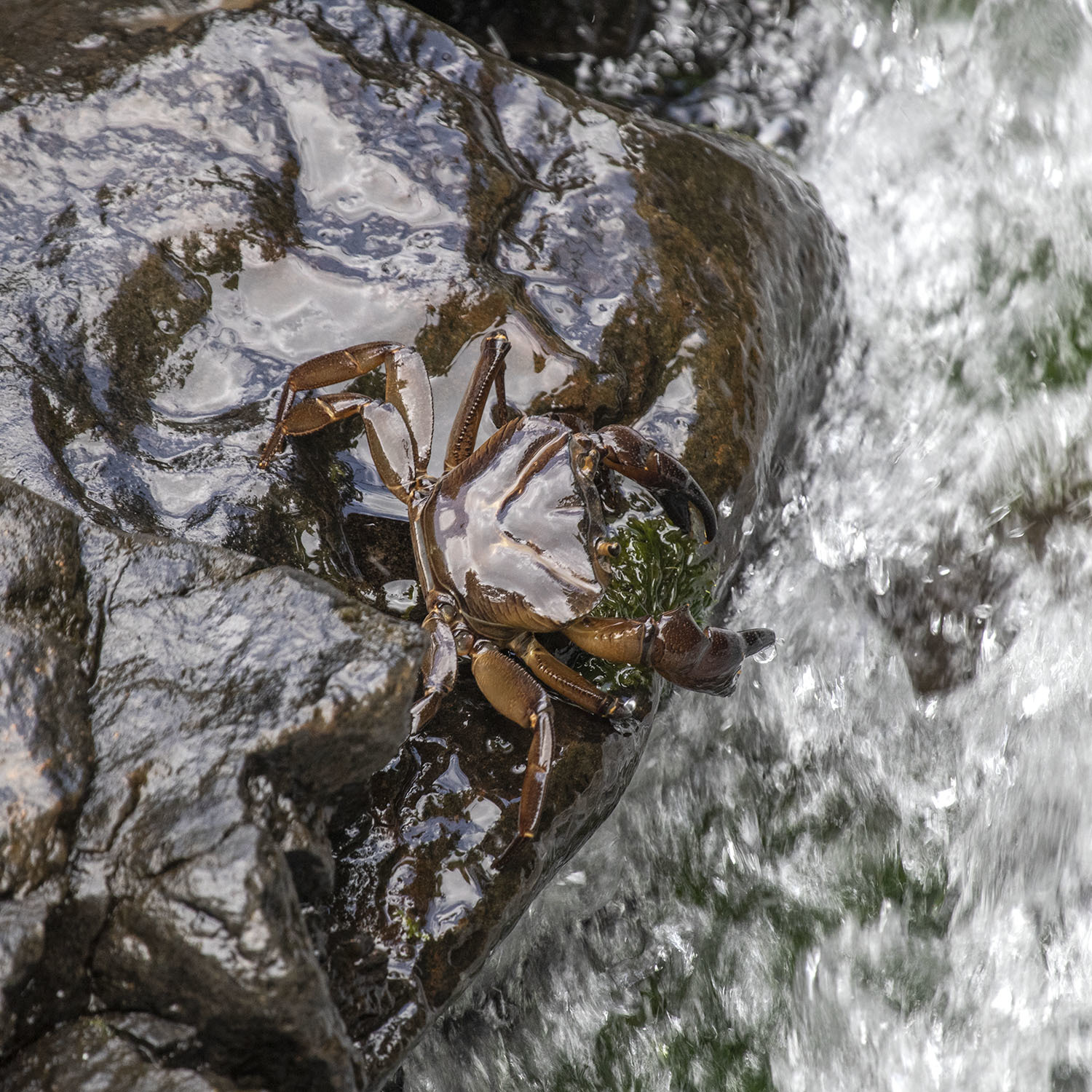
Barytelphusa cunicularis from a clear, clean, stream in Kaas plateau, Maharashtra.

In individuals from Nool and Harli river from Kolhapur district in Maharashtra, it was found that alteration occurs in microstructure of hepatopancreas with specific pathological changes, causing cellular arrangement to be disturbed due to contaminated water.

In another instance in Godavari River, with contaminated water, it was found that the crabs had levels of arsenic and chromium in some tissues which were higher than the recommended maximum allowable standards in food. This suggested that the Godavari river system was contaminated with heavy metals and hence the consumption of the crab from the river could pose health hazards to humans.

The crab also suffers from depletion in protein content in all tissues after exposure to cypermethrin and fenvalerate, which are two synthetic pyrethroid pesticides, commonly used in agriculture fields.

When exposed to lethal concentrations of mercuric chloride, the crabs exhibit histological changes in the gills due to the accumulation of mercuric chloride within the organism body at lethal levels which lead to histological lesion in the body of the crabs. Vacuolization of gill stem, fusion and ruptured gill lamella, destructed and congestion of haemocytes, thin connective fluid bands were ruptured. The mortality rate of crabs when exposed to heavy metal pesticides like copper sulfate and mercuric chloride was recorded to be at 24, 48, 72 and 96 hours. Mercuric chloride was found to be more toxic than copper sulfate.

Shell disease from individuals belonging to Wayanad, were found to have shell diseases. Infested crabs were observed to have prominent yellow colored circular lesions on the ventral carapace and limbs. The presence of isolates belonging to nine bacterial genera, Aeromonas, Alcaligenes, Bacillus, Chromobacterium, Enterobacter, Escherichia, Klebsiella, Micrococcus and Pseudomonas. Pseudomonas sp. and E. coli were found in the infested limb. Klebsiella and Pseudomonas were identified from carapace of normal crabs. Species level identification of the lesion causing pathogens remains to be determined.
