= Leptarma leptosoma =

Scientific classification
- Kingdom: Animalia
- Phylum: Arthropoda
- Clade: Pancrustacea
- Class: Malacostraca
- Order: Decapoda
- Suborder: Pleocyemata
- Infraorder: Brachyura
- Family: Sesarmidae
- Genus: Leptarma
- Species: L. leptosoma

Binomial name
- Leptarma leptosoma (Hilgendorf, 1869)

Synonyms
- Parasesarma leptosoma (Hilgendorf, 1869); Parasesarma leptosomum (Hilgendorf, 1896); Sesarma leptosoma Hilgendorf, 1869

Species of crab

Leptarma leptosoma, also known as the arboreal crab, is an arboreal, leaf-eating mangrove crab, from East and South Africa where it is found on Rhizophora mucronata and Bruguiera gymnorhiza, but not on Avicennia marina. It occupies an ecological niche similar to that of another sesarmid, Aratus pisonii, from the Americas.

Crabs of the family Sesarmidae are some of the most diverse and important components of mangrove estuary communities in the tropics and are not found in Europe. Two genera common in African, Asian and Australian mangroves are Parasesarma (26 species) and Perisesarma (23 species). Often colourful, they have a squarish appearance and have two transverse pectinated crests on the upper edge of the male chelar carpus. The two genera are separated by the absence in Parasesarma or presence in Perisesarma of an anterolateral tooth.

Leptarma leptosoma was formerly considered widespread in mangrove along the coast of the Indo-Pacific region. A taxonomic review found that this included several similar species and that the true L. leptosoma is restricted to coastal parts of South and East Africa, as far north as Tanzania. In order to escape low tide predators, this species twice daily climbs mangrove stems to the canopy and feeds on fresh leaves, and is commonly found on Rhizophora mucronata, but studies suggest that it prefers the foliage of Bruguiera gymnorhiza. Its diet also includes algae, mollusks, insects and annelids. Its aversion to Avicennia marina may be due to its secreting salt from its leaves, while both R. mucronata and B. gymnorhiza are salt excluders. Distinguishing characters are its propodus being three times the length of its dactylus, and the carapace width only some 2 cm. Females carry the eggs, which remain attached to the swimming legs or pleopods until hatching.

Important physiological adaptations enable these crabs to feed on leaves, with no evidence of fermentation in the gut, a solution common in other animals.

== Bibliography ==
- Walking Sideways: The Remarkable World of Crabs - Judith S. Weis (Cornell University Press, 23 Oct 2012) ISBN 9780801450501
