= Aratus (disambiguation) =

Aratus of Soli was a Greek didactic poet. "Aratus" may also refer to:

- Aratus of Sicyon (271–213 BC), an ancient Greek statesman, sixteen times strategos of the Achaean League
- Aratus the Younger of Sicyon, son of the previous and strategos of the Achaean League 219/18 BC.
- Aratus III of Sicyon, grandson of Aratus of Sicyon and ambassador of the Achaean League
- Aratus of Cnidus, the author of a history of Egypt, now lost
- Aratus (mythology), son of Asclepius in Greek mythology
- Aratus (crab), a crab genus
- Äratus, a 1989 Estonian film
