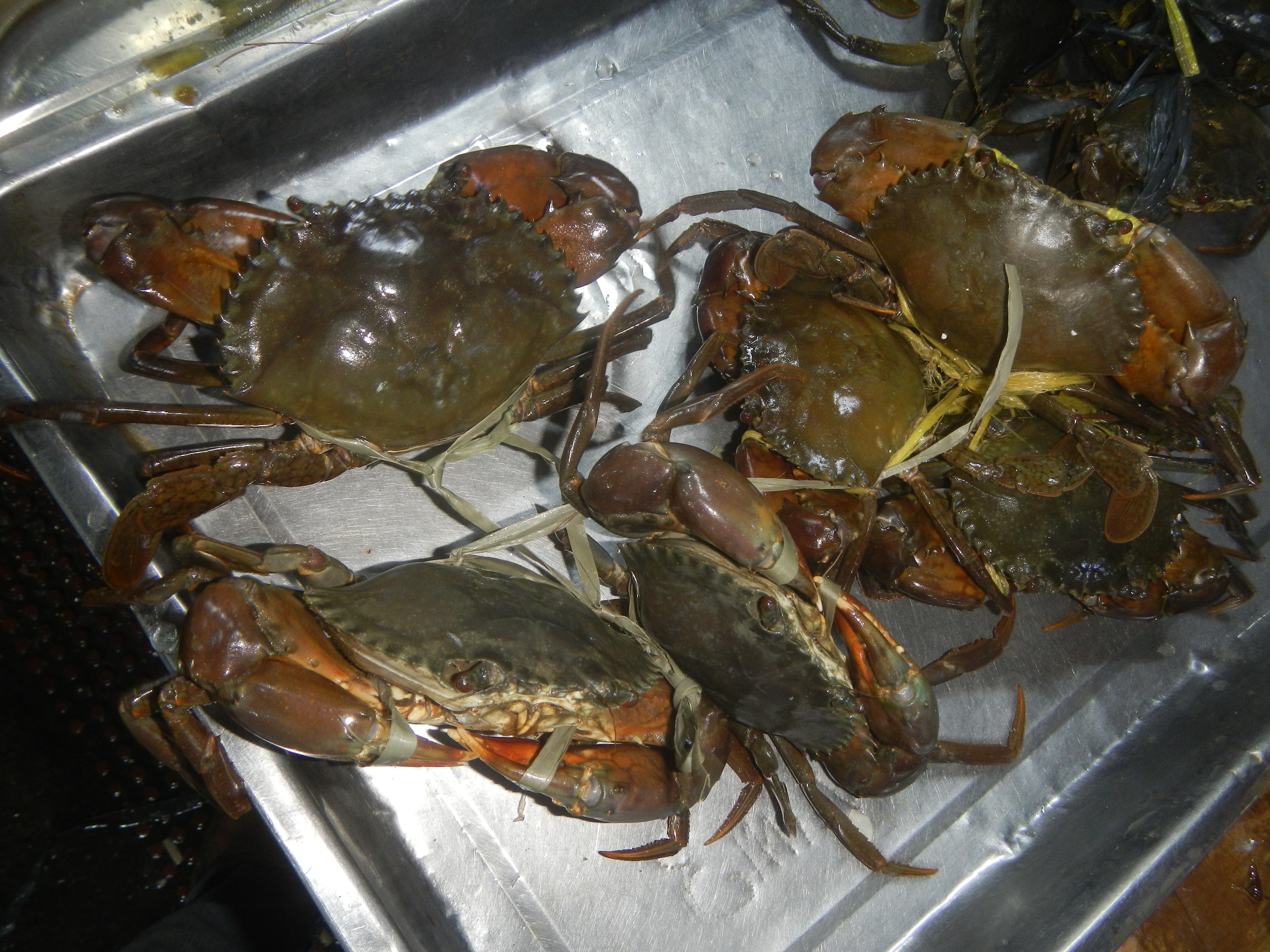
- Scylla olivacea from the Philippines

Scientific classification
- Domain: Eukaryota
- Kingdom: Animalia
- Phylum: Arthropoda
- Class: Malacostraca
- Order: Decapoda
- Suborder: Pleocyemata
- Infraorder: Brachyura
- Family: Portunidae
- Genus: Scylla
- Species: S. olivacea

Binomial name
- Scylla olivacea (Herbst, 1796)

= Scylla olivacea =

Species of crab

Scylla olivacea, commonly known as the orange mud crab, is a commercially important species of mangrove crab in the genus Scylla. It is one of several crabs known as the mud crab and is found in mangrove areas from Southeast Asia to Pakistan, and from Japan to northern Australia where it is known as a Wenlock Red. Along with other species in the genus Scylla, it is widely farmed in aquaculture using wild-caught stocks. They can be differentiated from other species of Scylla by having blunted spines on the dorsal distal corner of the palm (propodus) of the claw, and by the rounded frontal lobe spines with shallow separations in between the eyes.
