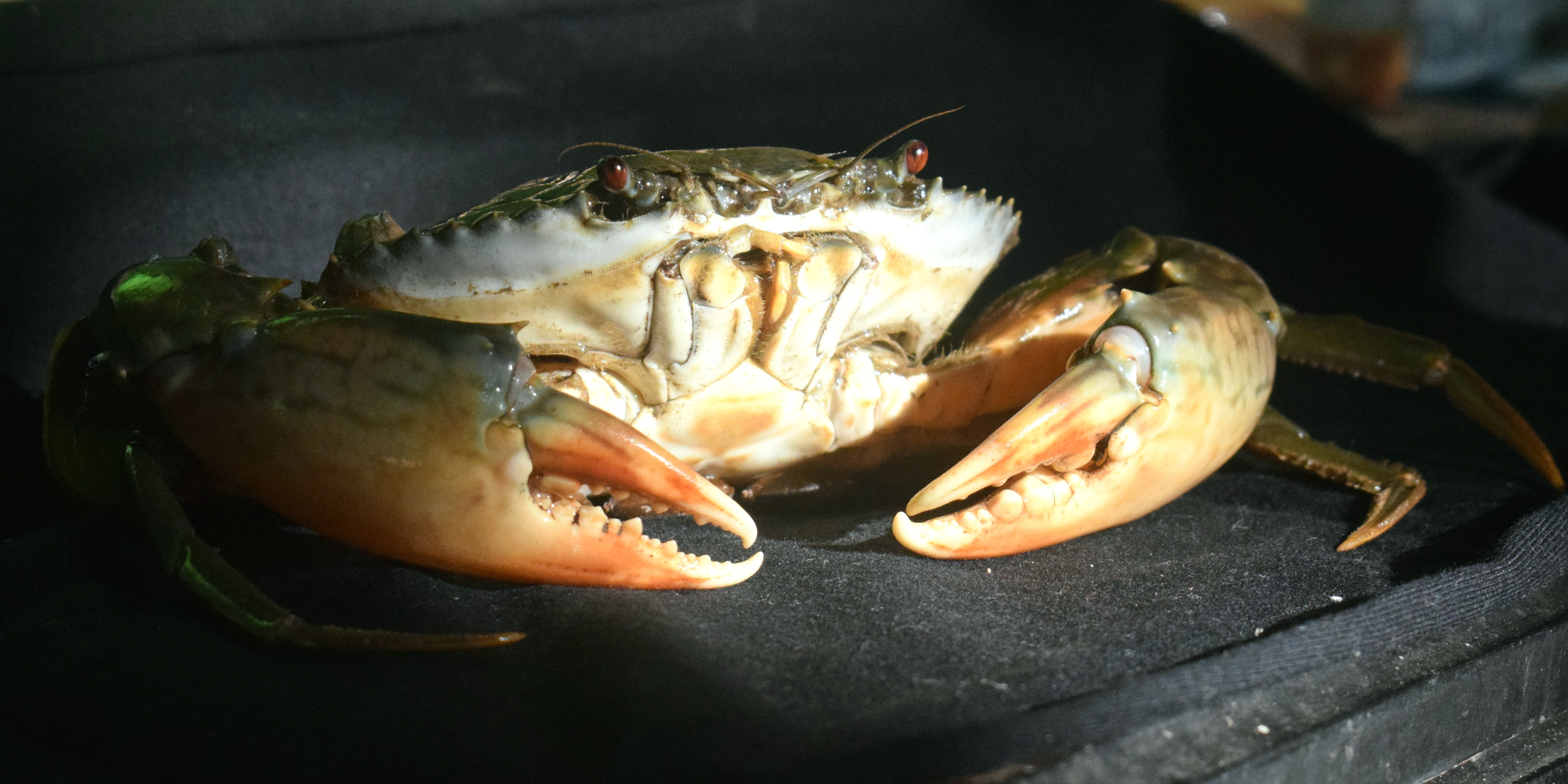
- Green mud crab, Scylla paramamosain from Bekasi, West Java, Indonesia

Scientific classification
- Kingdom: Animalia
- Phylum: Arthropoda
- Class: Malacostraca
- Order: Decapoda
- Suborder: Pleocyemata
- Infraorder: Brachyura
- Family: Portunidae
- Genus: Scylla
- Species: S. paramamosain

Binomial name
- Scylla paramamosain Estampador, 1949

Synonyms
- Scylla serrata var. paramamosain Estampador, 1950

= Scylla paramamosain =

Species of crab

Scylla paramamosain is a mud crab commonly consumed in Southeast Asia.

== Distribution ==
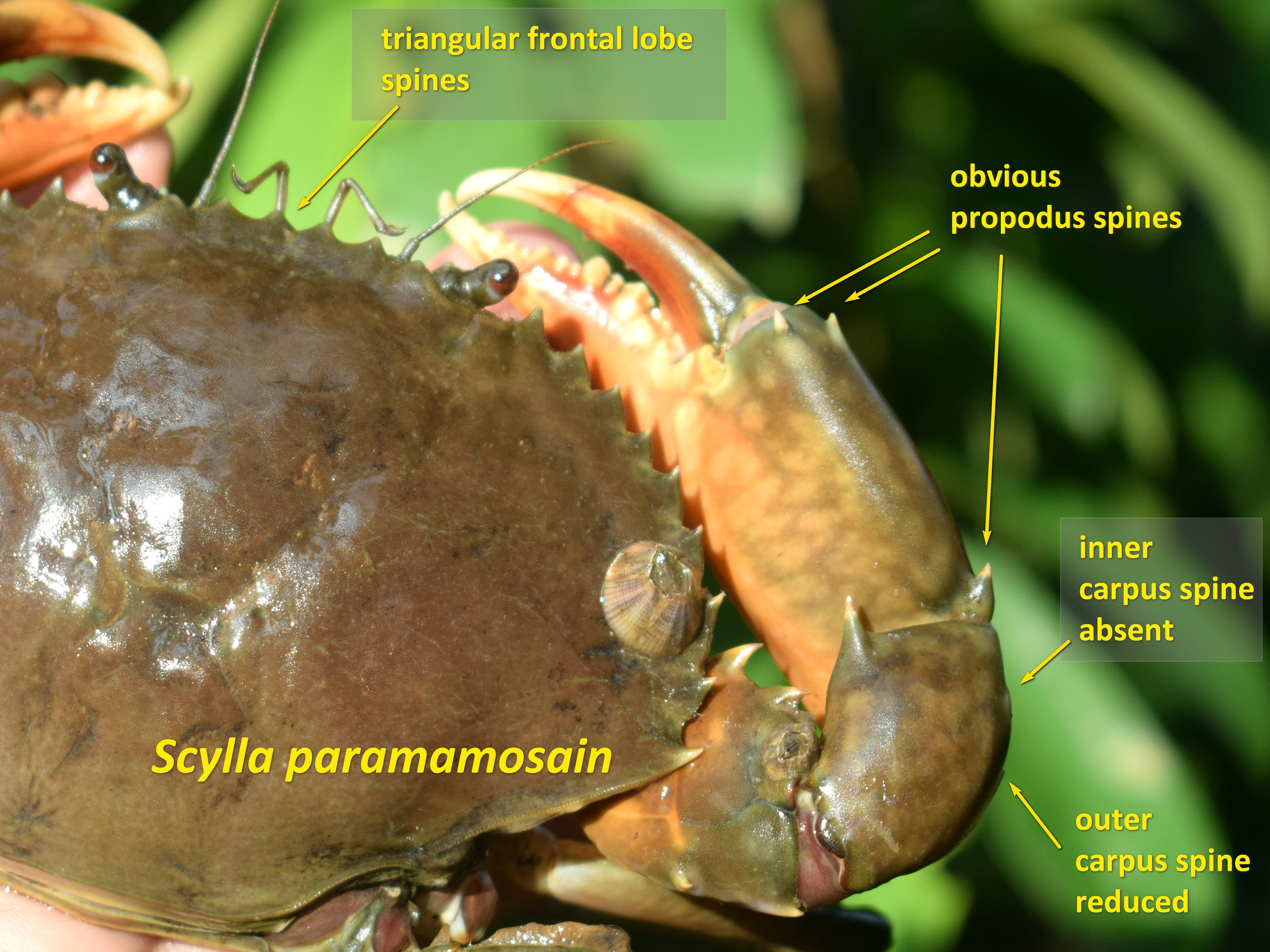
Identification

Scylla paramamosain is found along the coastlines of the South China Sea down to the Java Sea. It is now produced by aquaculture farms in southern Vietnam.

== Taxonomy ==
Scylla paramamosain was described by Eulogio P. Estampador in 1949, as a subspecies of Scylla serrata. It is now known that the crabs previously referred to as S. serrata in China were mostly S. paramamosain.
