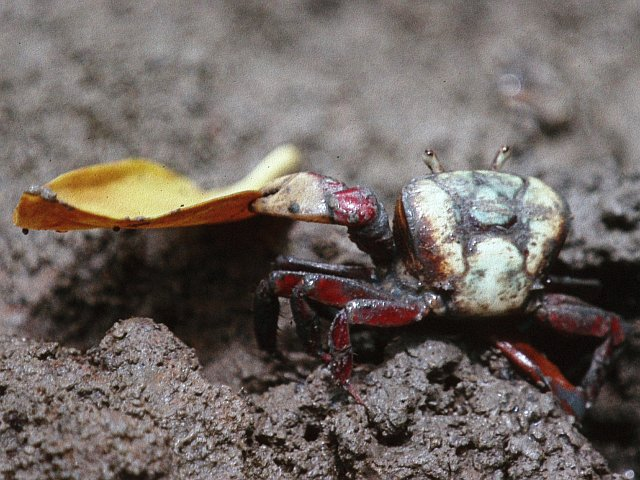
- Ucides cordatus with a Rhizophora mangle leaf

Scientific classification
- Kingdom: Animalia
- Phylum: Arthropoda
- Class: Malacostraca
- Order: Decapoda
- Suborder: Pleocyemata
- Infraorder: Brachyura
- Family: Ucididae; Števčić, 2005
- Genus: Ucides; Rathbun, 1897
- Range of U. cordatus (blue) and U. occidentalis (red)

= Ucides =

Genus of crabs

Ucides is a genus of mangrove crabs in the monotypic family Ucididae, containing two species:

- Ucides cordatus (Linnaeus, 1763) – Atlantic coast from Florida to Uruguay
- Ucides occidentalis (Ortmann, 1897) – Pacific coast from Mexico to Peru
