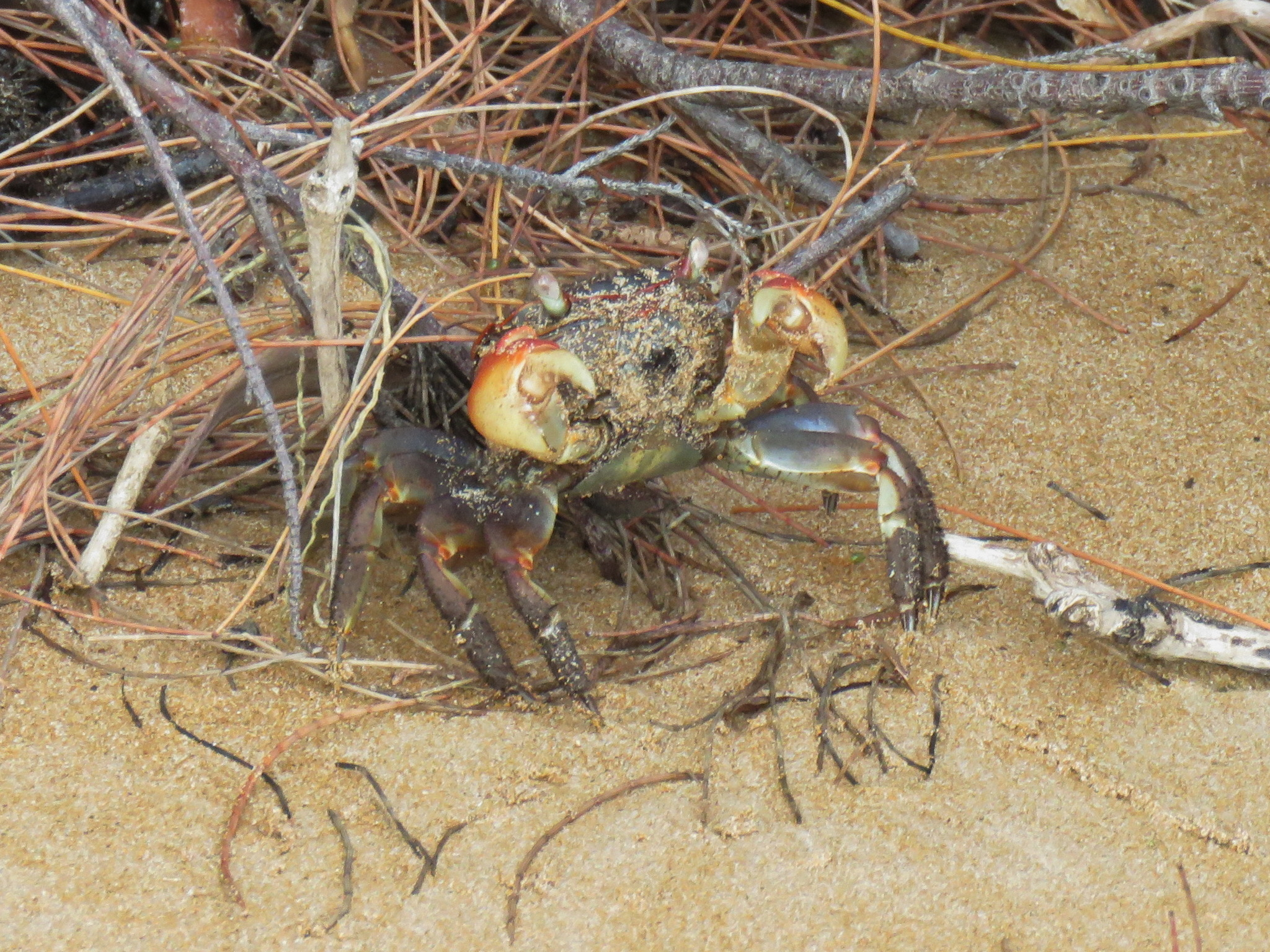

Scientific classification
- Kingdom: Animalia
- Phylum: Arthropoda
- Class: Malacostraca
- Order: Decapoda
- Suborder: Pleocyemata
- Infraorder: Brachyura
- Family: Sesarmidae
- Genus: Neosarmatium
- Species: N. australiense

Binomial name
- Neosarmatium australiense (Ragionieri, Fratini & Schubart, 2012)

= Neosarmatium australiense =

Species of crustaceans

Neosarmatium australiense is a species of mangrove crab in the family Sesarmidae. It is found in Western Australia and the Northern Territory from the Gulf of Carpentaria to the Kimberley coast, the only Neosarmatium in the area. They are known for moving in large numbers to the coast following heavy rains after the northern dry season.

The holotype is 39 by 35 mm (1.5 by 1.4 in). There is one notch in the carapace at each side. There are two colour morphs, both occurring in north western Australia, one with red-orange chelipeds with the fingers of the claw turning yellow at the ends, and one with pale dirty yellow fingers.

N. australiense was considered to be part of the species N. meinerti until 2012 when genetic study supplemented by analysis of physical characteristics revealed meinerti to be four separate species.
