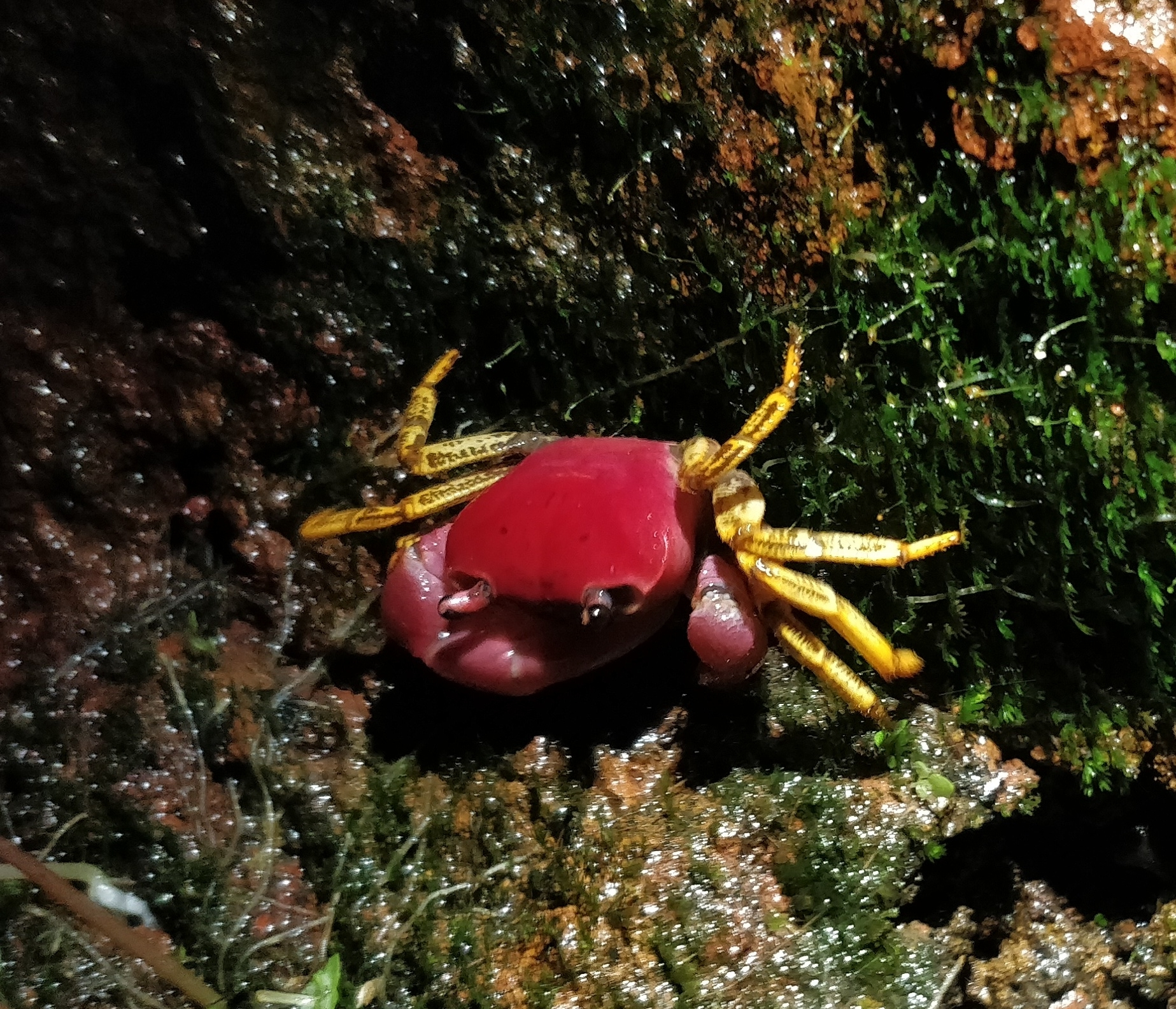

Scientific classification
- Kingdom: Animalia
- Phylum: Arthropoda
- Class: Malacostraca
- Order: Decapoda
- Suborder: Pleocyemata
- Infraorder: Brachyura
- Family: Gecarcinucidae
- Genus: Ghatiana
- Species: G. splendida

Binomial name
- Ghatiana splendida Pati, Thackeray & Khaire, 2016

= Ghatiana splendida =

Species of crab

Ghatiana splendida is a species of crab from India, first identified in 2016 in the Western Ghats. Tejas Thackeray, among the discovers of the species, has said that "locals" to where it was first described were aware of the species and would refer to it as the "purple tree crab" or the "pink forest crab". Thackeray first encountered the crab while searching for the olive forest snake.

Ghatiana splendida was first described along Ghatiana atropurpurea, Gubernatoriana alcocki, Gubernatoriana thackerayi, and Gubernatoriana waghi.
