= Ghatiana pulchra =

Scientific classification
- Domain: Eukaryota
- Kingdom: Animalia
- Phylum: Arthropoda
- Class: Malacostraca
- Order: Decapoda
- Suborder: Pleocyemata
- Infraorder: Brachyura
- Family: Gecarcinucidae
- Genus: Ghatiana
- Species: G. pulchra

Binomial name
- Ghatiana pulchra Pati & Thackeray, 2018

Species of crab

Ghatiana pulchra is a species of freshwater crab from the northern Western Ghats in India that was first identified in 2018.

== Characteristics ==
Ghatiana pulchra is distinguished from other crabs of the genus Ghatiana by its distinctive red-violet carapace, chelipeds with blanched fingers, as well as its dark red-violet ambulatory legs.

== Distribution ==
Ghatiana pulchra's type locality is Valmiki Pathaar in Satara district of Maharashtra. It is endemic to this area.

== Behaviour and ecology ==
Ghatiana pulchra is a highly stenotopic crab and restricted to an area of 1 km or less as it lives in the Valmiki Pathaar, which is an isolated, flat-topped, and high mountain. Such a high endemism of the species could be related to the isolated and elevated nature of the mountain that plays a role of 'sky island'. G.pulchara is restricted only to the edge of the mountain plateau on grassy slopes. It dwells inside the holes of boulders mainly of basaltic formation that are accumulated with rainwater. A couple of crabs were also noticed adventuring out in the open ground soon after the sunset, which indicates a crepuscular or even nocturnal nature of the species.
