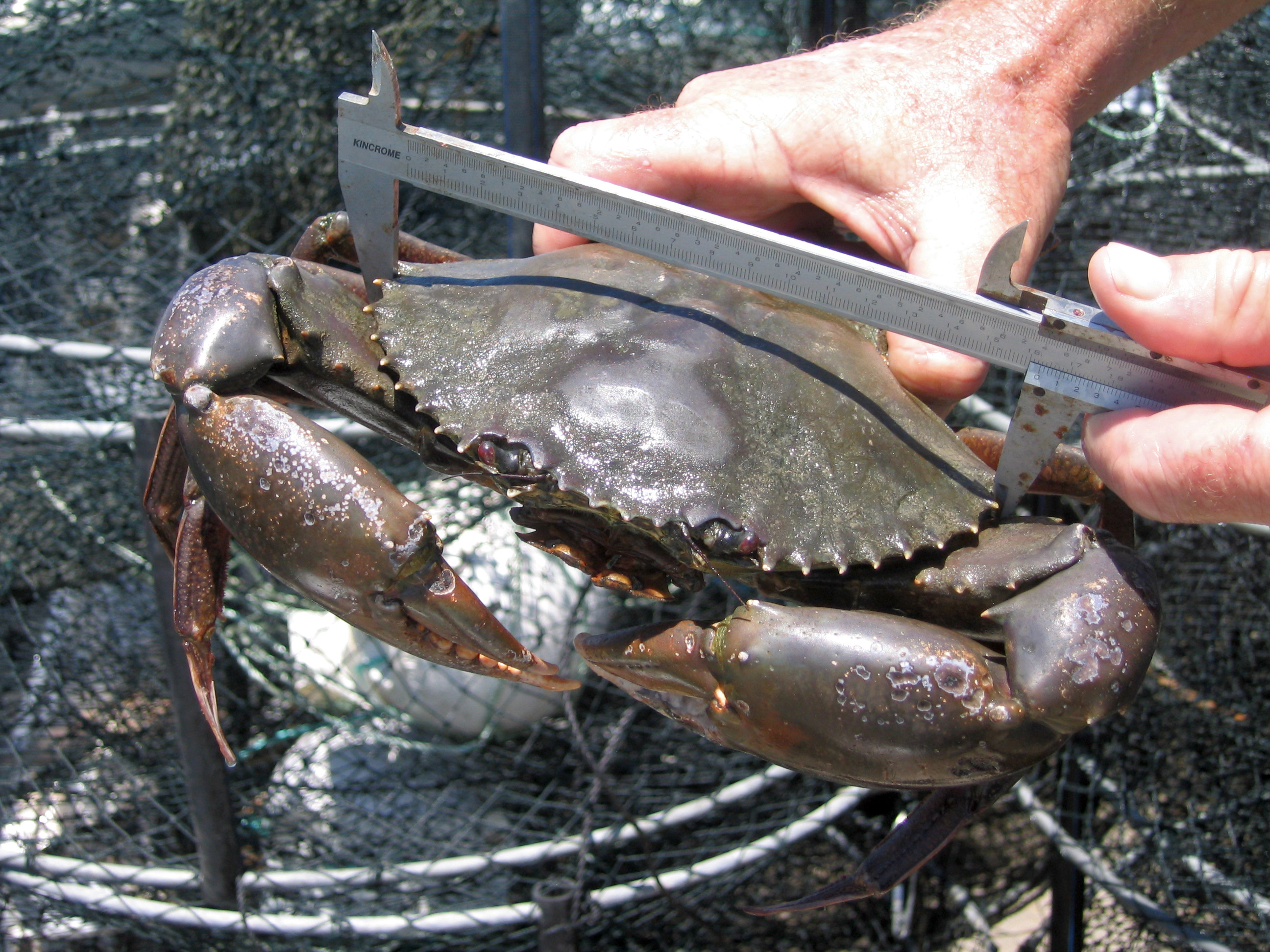
- Scylla serrata

Scientific classification
- Kingdom: Animalia
- Phylum: Arthropoda
- Class: Malacostraca
- Order: Decapoda
- Suborder: Pleocyemata
- Infraorder: Brachyura
- Family: Portunidae
- Subfamily: Portuninae
- Genus: Scylla; De Haan, 1833

= Scylla (crustacean) =

Genus of crabs

Scylla is a genus of swimming crabs, comprising four species, of which S. serrata is the most widespread. They are found across the Indo-West Pacific. The four species are:

| Image | Scientific name | Common name | Distribution |
|---|---|---|---|
| | Scylla olivacea (Herbst, 1796) | orange mud crab | Southeast Asia to Pakistan, and from Japan to northern Australia |
| | Scylla paramamosain Estampador, 1949 | | South China Sea south to the Java Sea |
| | Scylla serrata (Forskål, 1775) | black crab | Southern Japan to south-eastern Australia, northern New Zealand |
| | Scylla tranquebarica (Fabricius, 1798) | | Pakistan and Taiwan to the Malay Archipelago and other Indo-Pacific regions |
