= Mud crab =

Common name for any mud-dwelling crab

Mud crab may refer to any crab that lives in or near mud, such as:

- Scylla serrata
- Scylla tranquebarica
- Scylla paramamosain
- Scylla olivacea
- Members of the family Panopeidae, such as Panopeus herbstii
- Members of the family Xanthidae
- Helice crassa, the tunnelling mud crab
