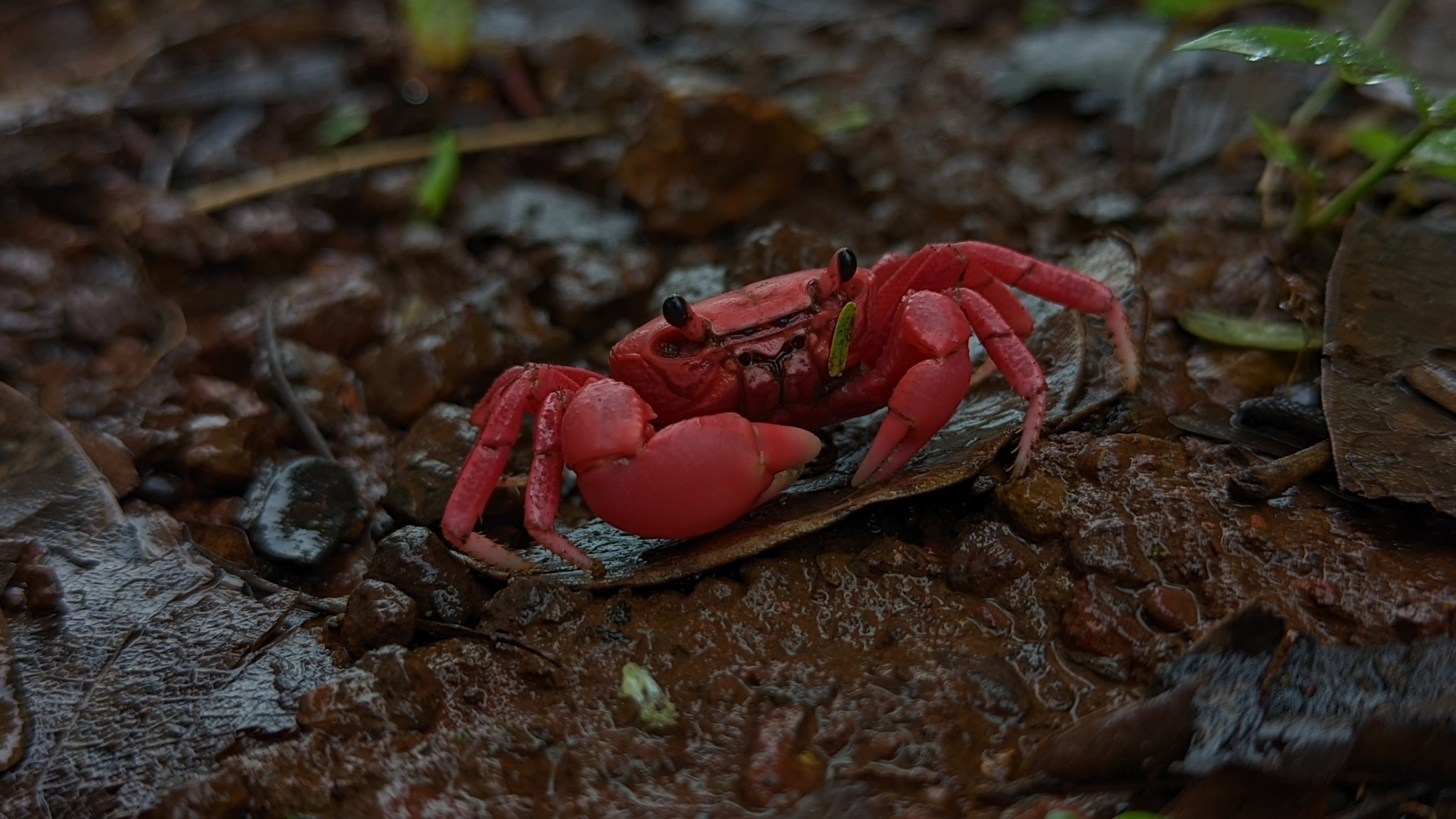

Scientific classification
- Kingdom: Animalia
- Phylum: Arthropoda
- Class: Malacostraca
- Order: Decapoda
- Suborder: Pleocyemata
- Infraorder: Brachyura
- Family: Gecarcinucidae
- Genus: Ghatiana; Pati & Sharma, 2014

Type species
- Ghatiana aurantiaca Pati & Sharma, 2014

= Ghatiana =

Genus of crabs

Ghatiana is a genus of freshwater crabs, found among the Western Ghats in India.

== Species ==
- Ghatiana atropurpurea Pati, Thackeray & Khaire, 2016
- Ghatiana aurantiaca Pati & Sharma, 2014
- Ghatiana basalticola (Klaus, Fernandez & Yeo, 2014)
- Ghatiana botti Pati & Thackeray, 2018
- Ghatiana durrelli Pati & Thackeray, 2021
- Ghatiana dvivarna Pati, Thackeray, Bajantri & Hegde, 2022
- Ghatiana hyacintha Pati & Sharma, 2014
- Ghatiana pulchra Pati & Thackeray, 2018
- Ghatiana rathbunae Pati & Thackeray, 2018
- Ghatiana rouxi Pati & Thackeray, 2021
- Ghatiana splendida Pati, Thackeray & Khaire, 2016
- Ghatiana sanguinolenta

Pati, Thackeray & Pawar. 2023

- Ghatiana dhritiarum Pati, Naik & Gouda, 2026
