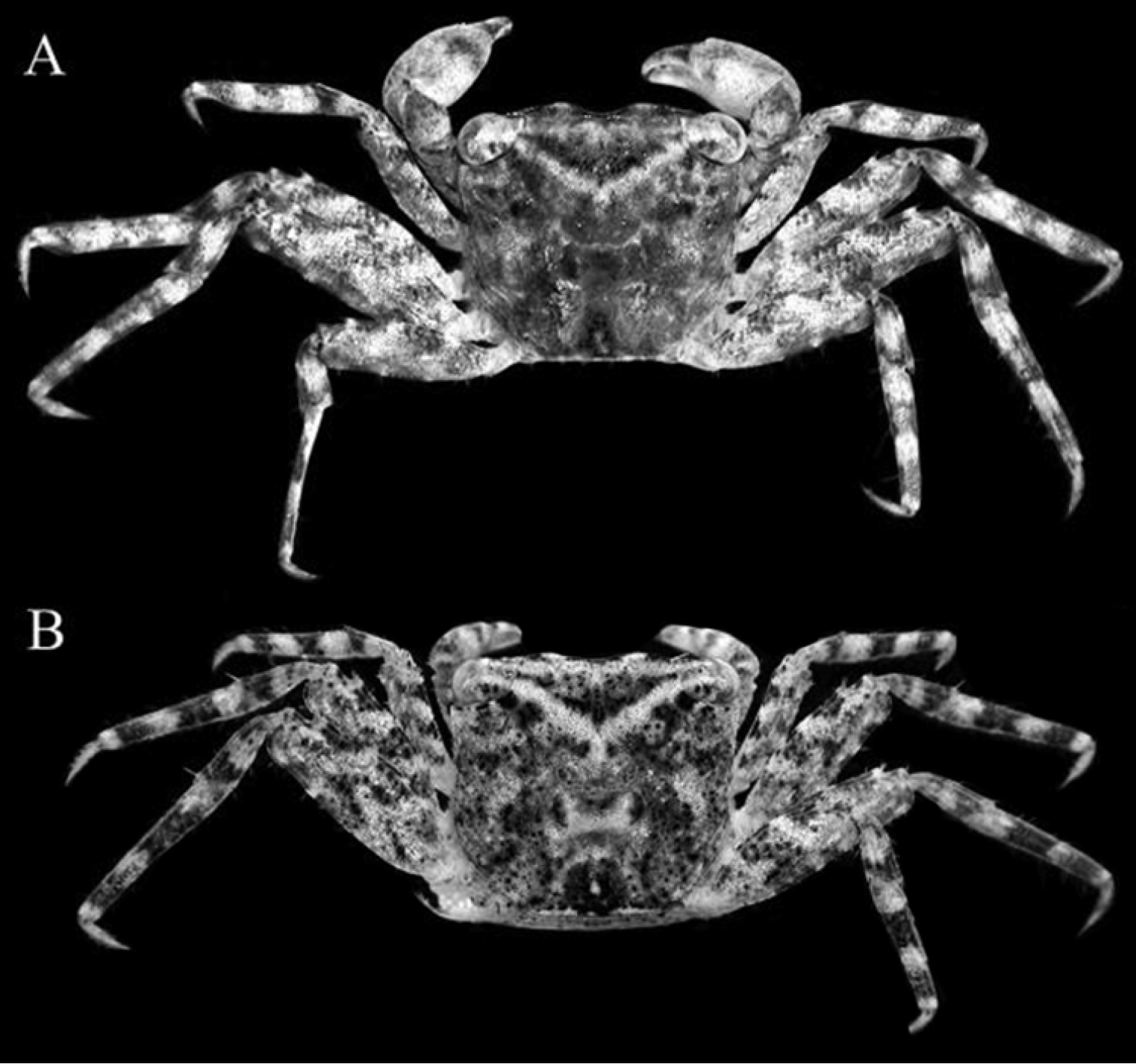
- Haberma tingkok

Scientific classification
- Domain: Eukaryota
- Kingdom: Animalia
- Phylum: Arthropoda
- Class: Malacostraca
- Order: Decapoda
- Suborder: Pleocyemata
- Infraorder: Brachyura
- Family: Sesarmidae
- Genus: Haberma; Ng & Schubart, 2002

= Haberma =

Genus of crustaceans

Haberma is genus of small mangrove or terrestrial crabs, typically less than 1 centimetre (0.4 in) across the carapace.

The genus was established by Ng and Schubart in 2002 with the discovery of the species Haberma nanum in Singapore. A second species, Haberma kamora, was discovered in Papua. Most recently, Haberma tingkok was discovered in Hong Kong. The genus is distinguished by the first two pairs of the male ambulatory legs, which have characteristic subchelate dactyli and propodi.

== Species ==
- Haberma kamora
- Haberma nanum
- Haberma tingkok
