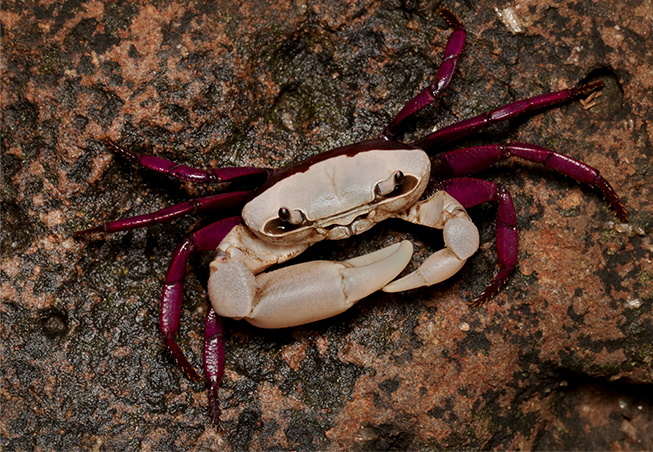

Scientific classification
- Kingdom: Animalia
- Phylum: Arthropoda
- Class: Malacostraca
- Order: Decapoda
- Suborder: Pleocyemata
- Infraorder: Brachyura
- Family: Gecarcinucidae
- Genus: Ghatiana
- Species: G. dvivarna

Binomial name
- Ghatiana dvivarna Pati & Thackeray, 2022

= Ghatiana dvivarna =

Species of crab

Ghatiana dvivarna is a species of freshwater crab from the Central Western Ghats in India that was first identified in 2022.

== Discovery ==
The species was first sighted June 30, 2021, in Anshi wildlife range, Kali Tiger Reserve in Karnataka. Parshuram Prabhu Bajantri a forest guard at the wildlife range was looking for a saw-scaled viper from the region. His friend accompanying him had suggested to check deeper forest areas near laterite rocks when he spotted the crab near a waterbody. He took pictures of the crab and shared it with Varad Giri, the head scientist at Reliance Foundation. Giri checked the photos and said it was likely a new species. A year later, a paper was published in August 2022, announcing the new species.

== Distribution ==
Ghatiana dvivarna's type locality is Bare in the Uttara Kannada district of Karnataka in the Western Ghats. It is endemic to this area.

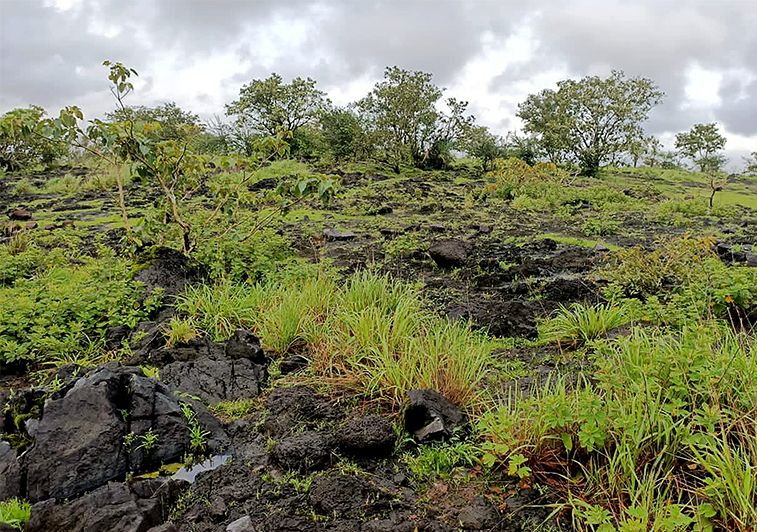
Ghatiana dvivarna's type locality

== Etymology ==
The specific epithet, dvivarna (द्विवर्ण) is derived from the Sanskrit word for ‘bicolor’, after his discover Mr.P.P.Bhajantri wanted to name the crab in Kannada, so the Sanskrit word (which is also present in Kannada) was chosen, referring to the crab's colour in life, which mainly consists of two colours (white and red-violet).

== Behaviour and ecology ==
The species inhabits elevated mountains of the Central Western Ghats in rocky outcrops with grassy vegetation. The holes in the laterite rocks are their natural habitat. Individuals can also take shelter underneath small boulders. They are generally seen during the monsoon (June–September). They are mostly active during the twilight. As many as 30–40 crabs can be seen during this time when the weather is very cloudy with precipitation or mist.
