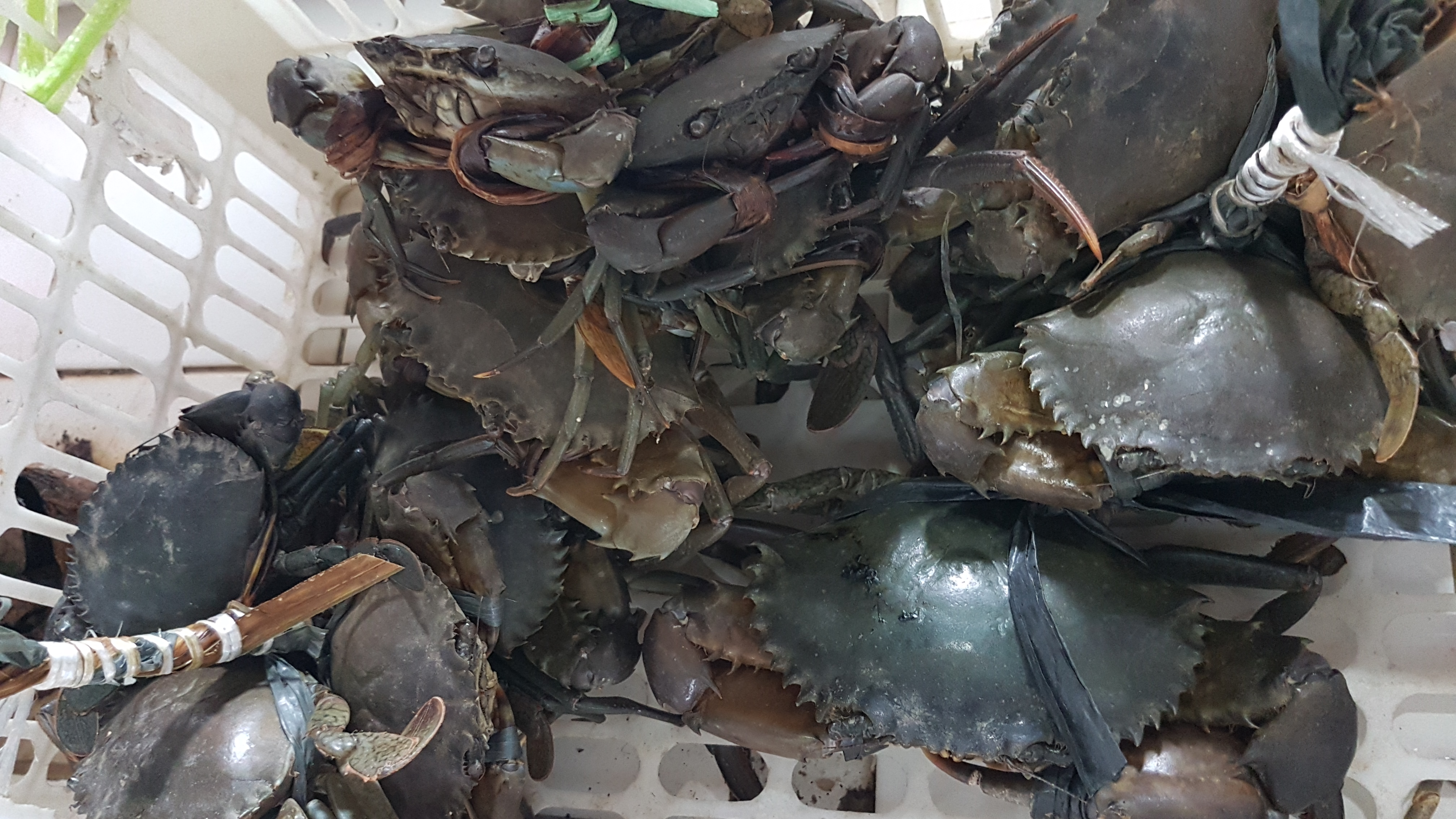
- Scylla tranquebarica from a fish market in the Philippines

Scientific classification
- Kingdom: Animalia
- Phylum: Arthropoda
- Clade: Pancrustacea
- Class: Malacostraca
- Order: Decapoda
- Suborder: Pleocyemata
- Infraorder: Brachyura
- Family: Portunidae
- Genus: Scylla
- Species: S. tranquebarica

Binomial name
- Scylla tranquebarica (Fabricius, 1798)

= Scylla tranquebarica =

Species of crab

Scylla tranquebarica is a species of mangrove crab in the genus Scylla. Scylla tranquebarica, one of several crabs known as the mud crab, is found in mangrove areas from Pakistan and Taiwan to the Malay Archipelago and other Indo-Pacific regions.
