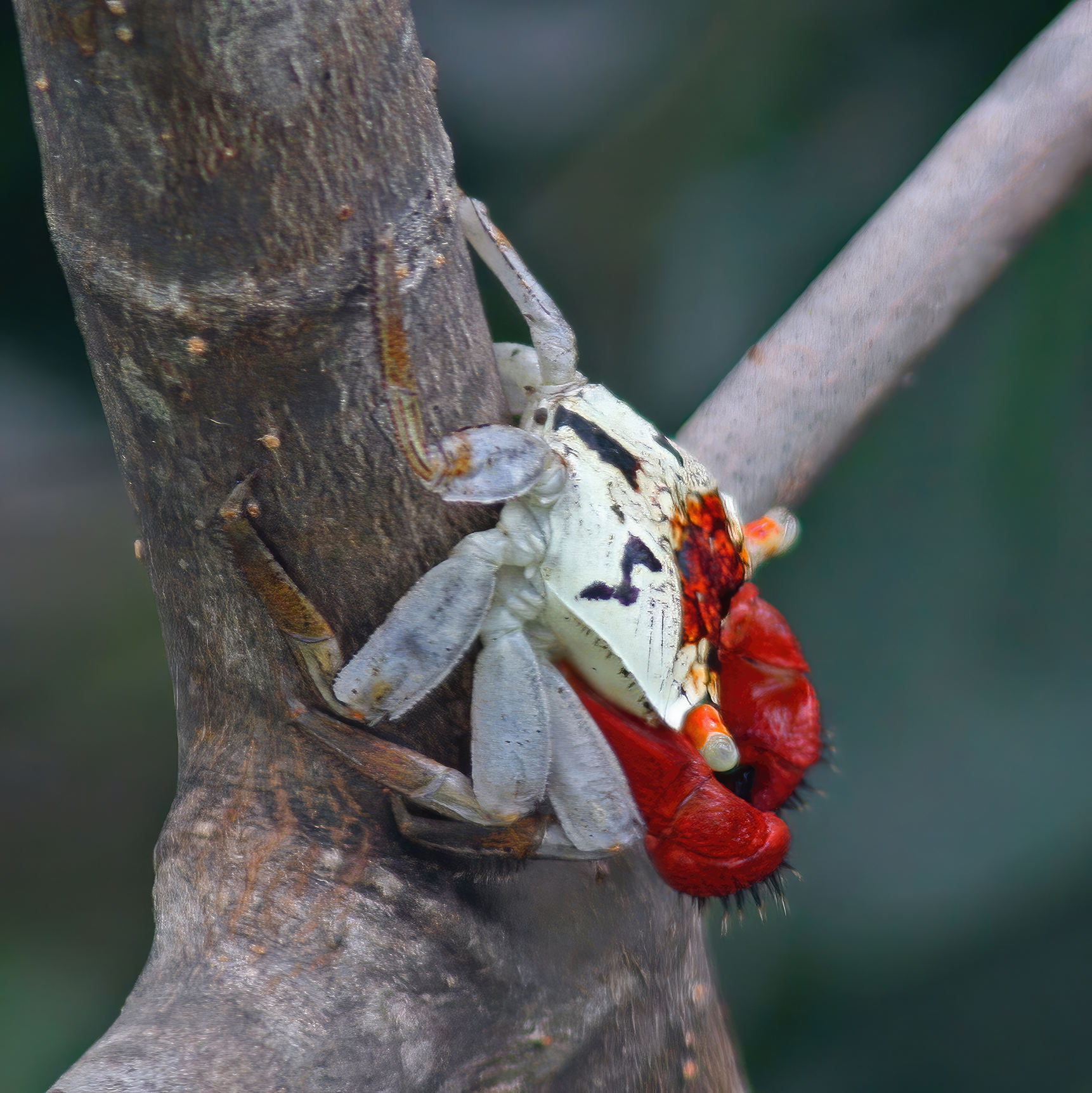
- Aratus pacificus Costa Rica

Scientific classification
- Domain: Eukaryota
- Kingdom: Animalia
- Phylum: Arthropoda
- Class: Malacostraca
- Order: Decapoda
- Suborder: Pleocyemata
- Infraorder: Brachyura
- Family: Sesarmidae
- Genus: Aratus; H. Milne-Edwards, 1853

= Aratus (crab) =

Genus of mangrove crabs

Aratus is a neotropical genus of tree-climbing mangrove crabs in the serarmid family. The genus was first described by Henri Milne-Edwards in 1853, by separating A. pisonii (from genus Sesarma) into its own monotypic genus. Aratus has a range spanning Baja California and Sonora, south to Peru along the east Pacific, and from Florida to Brazil in the west Atlantic. Though there has long been attempts to distinguish the Atlantic and Pacific populations of Aratus into separate taxa, it was not until 2014 that sufficient genetic and morphological evidence was collected for the Pacific population to be described as a distinct species.

== Species ==
- Aratus pisonii (H. Milne-Edwards, 1837)
- Aratus pacificus Thiercelin & Schubart, 2014
