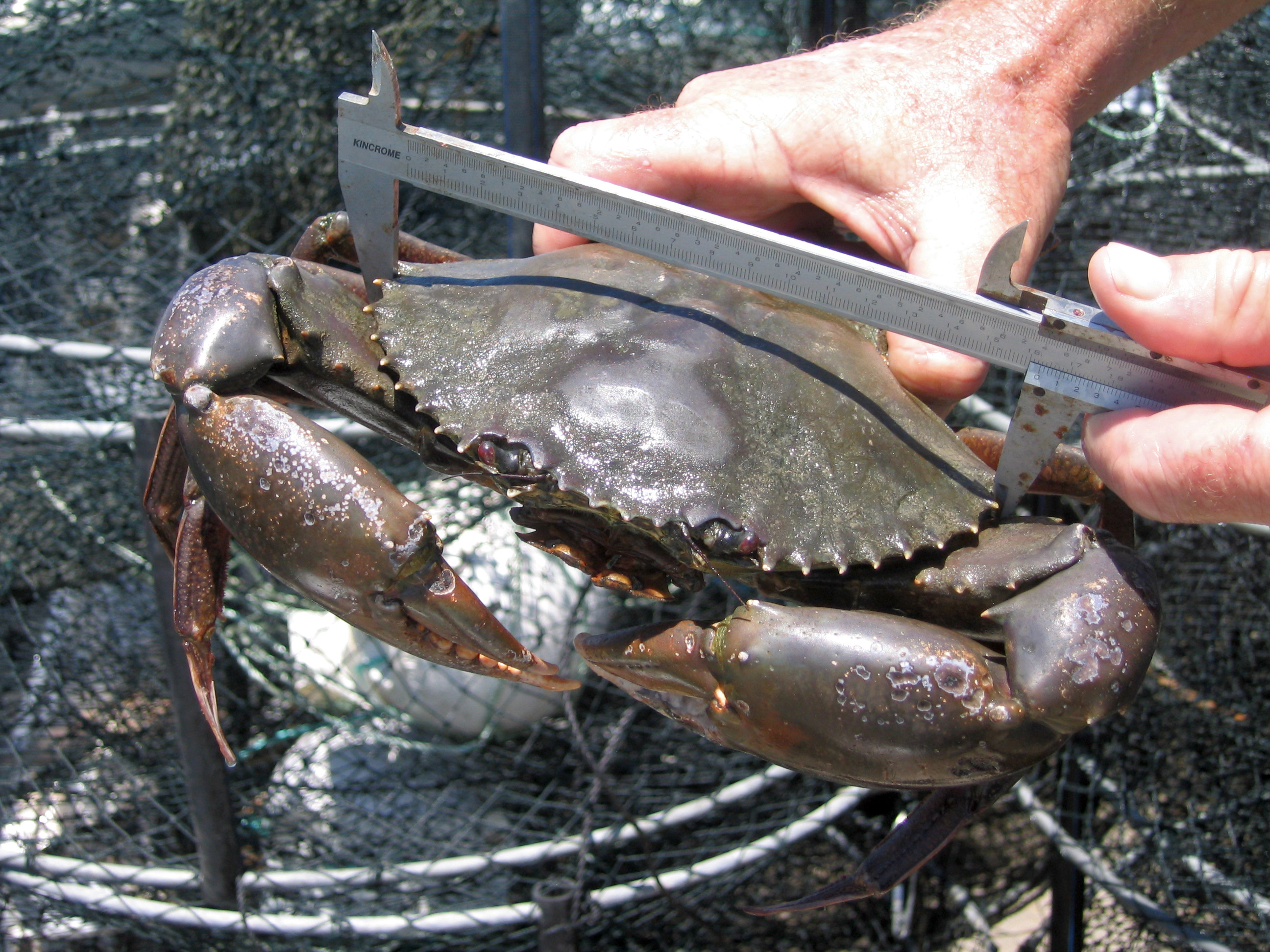

Scientific classification
- Kingdom: Animalia
- Phylum: Arthropoda
- Clade: Pancrustacea
- Class: Malacostraca
- Order: Decapoda
- Suborder: Pleocyemata
- Infraorder: Brachyura
- Family: Portunidae
- Genus: Scylla
- Species: S. serrata

Binomial name
- Scylla serrata (Forsskål, 1775)

= Scylla serrata =

Species of crab

Capture (blue) and aquaculture (green) production of Indo-Pacific swamp crab (Scylla serrata) in thousand tonnes from 1950 to 2022, as reported by the FAO

Scylla serrata (often called mud crab or mangrove crab, although both terms are highly ambiguous, and black crab) is an ecologically important species of crab found in the estuaries and mangroves of Africa, Australia, and Asia. In their most common forms, their shell colours vary from a deep, mottled green to very dark brown.

== Distribution ==
The natural range of S. serrata is in the Indo-Pacific. It is found from South Africa, around the coast of the Indian Ocean, where it is especially abundant in Sri Lanka, to the Southeast Asian Archipelago, as well as from southern Japan to south-eastern Australia, northern New Zealand, and as far east as Fiji and Samoa. The species has also been introduced to Hawaii and Florida.

In Hawaii, mud crabs are colloquially known as Samoan crabs, as they were originally imported from American Samoa. As these crabs are known for their robust size and dense meat content, they have been greatly sought after over the years. As a result of overcrabbing, local government efforts have restricted harvesting of crabs smaller than 6 inches (width across back) and to harvest females of any size is illegal.

== Ecology ==
A study on tidal flats in Deception Bay in Queensland found juvenile crabs (20–99 mm or 13/16–3 7/8 in carapace width) were resident in the mangrove zone, remaining there during low tide, while subadults (100–149 mm or 3 15/16–5 7/8 in) migrated into the intertidal zone to feed at high tide and retreated to subtidal waters at low tide. Adults (150 mm or 6 in and larger) were caught mainly below the low-tide mark, with small numbers captured in the intertidal zone at high tide.

These crabs are highly cannibalistic in nature; when crabs undergo molting, other hard-shelled ones sometimes attack the molting crabs and devour them. The females can give birth to a million offspring, which can grow up to 3.5 kg (8 lb) in size and have a shell width up to 26 cm (10 in) wide.
