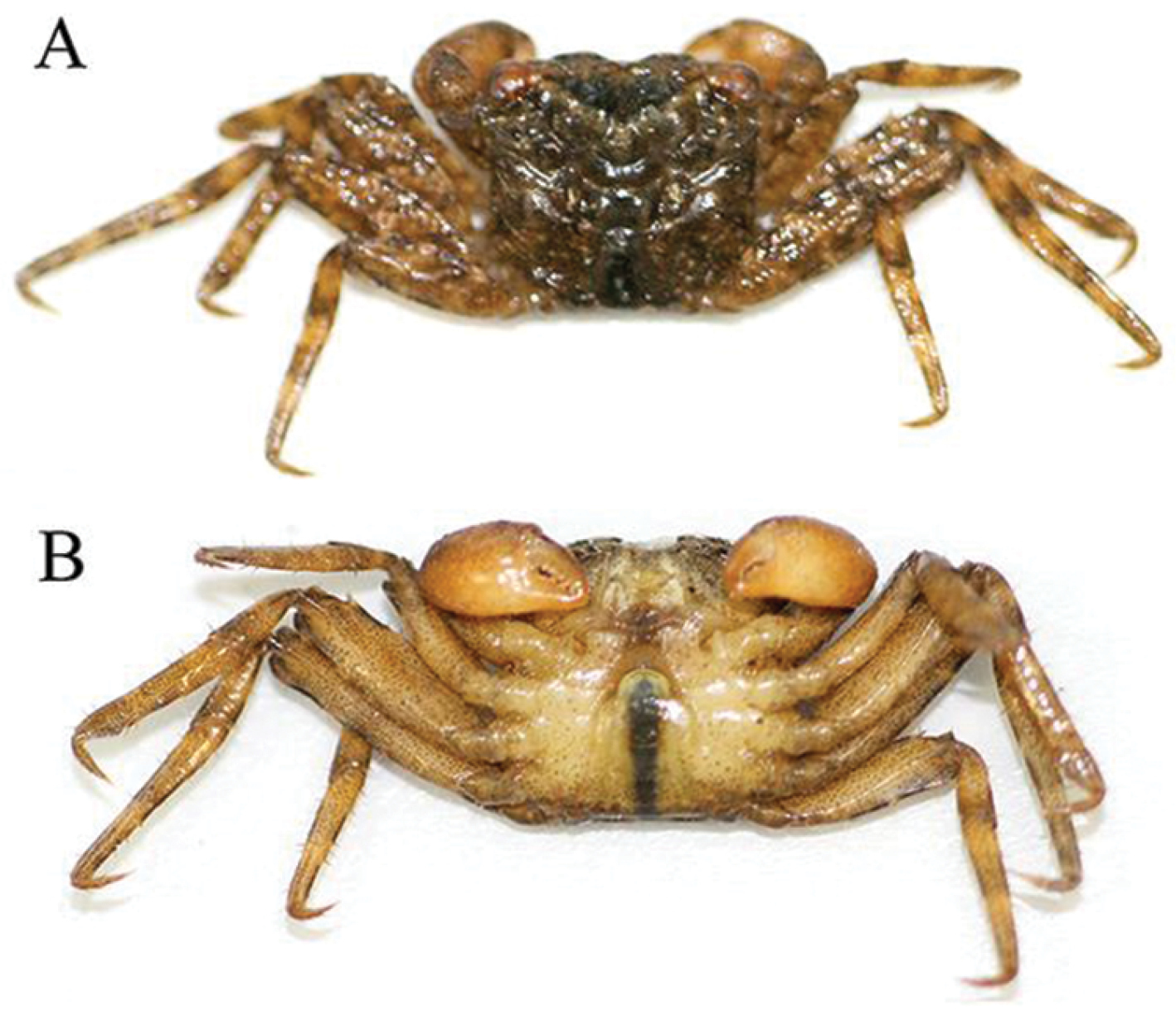

Scientific classification
- Domain: Eukaryota
- Kingdom: Animalia
- Phylum: Arthropoda
- Class: Malacostraca
- Order: Decapoda
- Suborder: Pleocyemata
- Infraorder: Brachyura
- Family: Sesarmidae
- Genus: Haberma
- Species: H. tingkok

Binomial name
- Haberma tingkok Cannacci & Ng 2017

= Haberma tingkok =

Species of crustacean

Haberma tingkok is a species of micro-mangrove crab native to Hong Kong. It was first discovered by Stefano Cannicci from the University of Hong Kong and Peter Ng from the University of Singapore in the Ting Kok Mangrove forests in the northeast of Hong Kong and listed on the World Register of Marine Species (WoRMS) in April 2017. It was the third species placed in the genus Haberma, which was described in 2002.

== Appearance ==
Haberma tingkok displays typical decapod anatomy. Ten limbs, arranged around the lower half of the carapace, are composed of eight multi-jointed legs used for mobility and two claws. The two equally sized claws are located on either side of the mouth and serve as the primary manipulation points for the crab.

The top of the carapace is a combination of dark olive green and black. The legs are a tan with darker mottling around the top. The underside of the carapace is a light tan with a single black stripe going down the middle. This coloration may help with camouflage, protecting the crab from predators.

== Habitat and diet ==
Haberma tingkok appears to be arboreal. When it was first discovered in 2017, most specimens were found in mangrove trees in the intertidal zone of the Ting Kok mangrove forest at a height of between 1.5 and 1.8 m. To facilitate climbing trees, the ambulatory legs are thin and long with the third pair of legs being the longest. Due to their tropical habitat, it is assumed that the crabs have developed high plasticity in dealing with abnormal climate changes, including resistance to heat-stress.

There is little information available about the diet. However, due to the similarity to Aratus pisonii, it can be assumed that Haberma tingkok are omnivores with a diet consisting largely of mangrove tree leaves as well as small invertebrates.

== Life cycle ==
There is limited information available on the life cycle of Haberma tingkok. It is assumed that the life cycle resembles that of Aratis pisonii, which reproduces throughout the entire year. The crabs can only mate immediately after the female has molted while the protective exoskeleton is still soft. Both female H. tingkok and A. pisonii carry the eggs on the underside of the abdomen until the larvae hatch. When hatching begins, the females move into the water and disperse the larvae. The larva undergoes four stages during which major body parts, such as the legs and claws, develop. Each stage lasts approximately one week. The various larval forms are significantly smaller than the adult, ranging in size from 0.3 to 0.7 mm.

Adult Haberma tingkok undergo several molting stages during which it sheds its hard exoskeleton and grows while the new exoskeleton is still soft. The life expectancy is not yet known.
