= Perisesarma =

Scientific classification
- Kingdom: Animalia
- Phylum: Arthropoda
- Clade: Pancrustacea
- Class: Malacostraca
- Order: Decapoda
- Suborder: Pleocyemata
- Infraorder: Brachyura
- Family: Sesarmidae
- Genus: Perisesarma; De Man, 1895
- Species: P. dusumieri

Binomial name
- Perisesarma dusumieri (H. Milne Edwards, 1853)

Genus of crabs

Perisesarma is a monotypic genus of mangrove crabs in the family Sesarmidae that once included over two dozen species, but now comprises only Perisesarma dusumieri.
