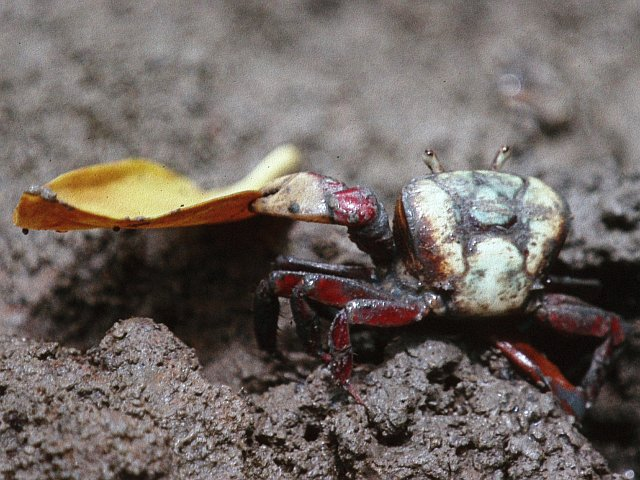
- Ucides cordatus with a Rhizophora mangle leaf

Scientific classification
- Kingdom: Animalia
- Phylum: Arthropoda
- Class: Malacostraca
- Order: Decapoda
- Suborder: Pleocyemata
- Infraorder: Brachyura
- Family: Ucididae
- Genus: Ucides
- Species: U. cordatus

Binomial name
- Ucides cordatus (Linnaeus, 1763)

= Ucides cordatus =

Species of crustacean

Ucides cordatus, the swamp ghost crab (or caranguejo-uçá in Portuguese), is one of two species of crabs in the genus Ucides. This species of crab is native to many coasts off of the western Atlantic Ocean. It has been found to be native to areas as far north as Florida and to as south as Uruguay. U. cordatus is especially noteworthy in Brazil as it plays important roles in the economy and food resources at Brazil's Atlantic borders.

Like most other crabs, U. cordatus has two distinct pinchers for different uses. Its left sharp pincher functions to cut and feed; its right pincher is much larger and is used to crush objects. It has an oval back with a unique color scheme. U. cordatus is one of many animals that have sexual dimorphism. Most noticeably, female crabs are larger than males. Males have a flatter oval shaped back with a distinct light blue in the middle with a beige white encompassing its back. On the other hand, females have much larger, bulbous backs. Their carapaces are a dull dark green with dark purple. Both genders' legs are also a dark reddish purple.

== Habitat ==
Ucides cordatus is from the mangrove crab genus and are primarily found in mangrove forests. They are largely terrestrial, and they will create their homes at the bases of trees in the form of burrows. These burrows have been seen to be as deep as 1.6 meters down. Their burrows have been found to play an important role in balancing carbon dioxide in mangrove forests. The increase in sedimentary surface area allows for a greater area for oxidation to occur especially during the rain season.

While it has been documented to eat animal remains, U. cordatus is primarily a herbivore. The diet of U. cordatus largely consists of mangrove litter (ie. leaves, bark, roots etc.). During the early months of its life, the species feeds on polychaete worms and microorganisms found in sediments. They purposely ingest sediments that they collect outside their burrows. It has been noted that U. cordatus prefers certain mangrove species; it has been found to prefer Rhizophora mangle over Avicennia germinans, but the reasons for this preference is unknown.

U. cordatus has few predators. Animals known to hunt U. cordatus include, but are not limited: coati, monkeys, and hawks. With such few predators, populations of U. cordatus tend to grow quite well because of this. However, populations of U. cordatus are also greatly exploited by locals primarily in Brazil. The overall U. cordatus population has seen a steady decrease since 1988.

Unlike most animals, the proportion of genders within populations are skewed in favor of the males. Studies have found the ratio of females to males is 53% to 62%, respectively.

== Behavior ==
Like many other crabs, U. cordatus will migrate during mating season, which occurs during the months of November to January. They will leave their burrows to reach the ocean coast. In doing so, they create the migration phenomenon known as "a andada", which is Portuguese for 'the walking'. At the coast, the crabs will mate then lay their eggs, after which they will return to their origin.

== Conservation efforts ==
Ucides cordatus can play important roles in determining and empirically quantifying successful mangrove reserves. They are well known for being a sentinel species, and efforts to determine their biological changes have been common methods by which researchers have determined effectiveness of reserves. Environmental changes such as increase of heavy metals, fertilizer runoff, and other xenobiotics have been correlated back to U. cordatus and their biological status.

There are also legal restrictions to capturing U. cordatus. Due to their popularity, and decreasing population sizes, some states of Brazil have enacted restrictions of the size of crabs people are allowed to hunt. States like Paraiba have laws preventing the capture of females crabs smaller than 4.5 cm. However, according to many gatherers, these laws are not entirely enforced.
