= Neosarmatium smithi =

Scientific classification
- Kingdom: Animalia
- Phylum: Arthropoda
- Class: Malacostraca
- Order: Decapoda
- Suborder: Pleocyemata
- Infraorder: Brachyura
- Family: Sesarmidae
- Genus: Neosarmatium
- Species: N. smithi

Binomial name
- Neosarmatium smithi (Tweedie, 1940)

Synonyms
- Sesarma smithi H. Milne Edwards, 1853

Species of crab

Neosarmatium smithi, is a mangrove-dwelling crab species in the genus Neosarmatium, distributed across mangroves of the Indo-West Pacific regions.

== Distribution ==
A mangrove inhabitant, it is found all over South Africa, Madagascar, Mauritius, India, Sri Lanka, Malaysia, Japan, China, Philippines, Thailand, Singapore, Indonesia, Vietnam and Australia.
