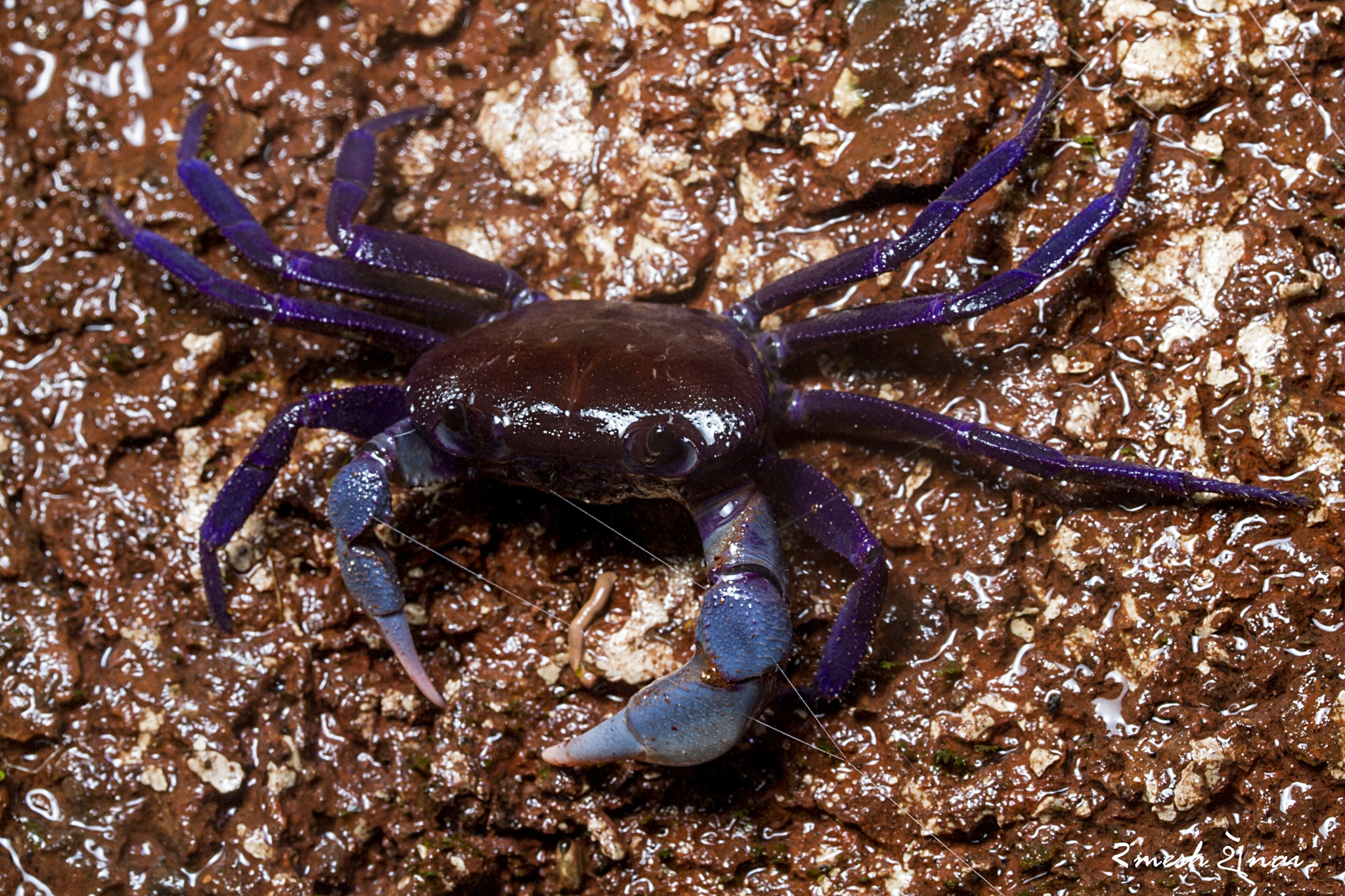

Scientific classification
- Domain: Eukaryota
- Kingdom: Animalia
- Phylum: Arthropoda
- Class: Malacostraca
- Order: Decapoda
- Suborder: Pleocyemata
- Infraorder: Brachyura
- Family: Gecarcinucidae
- Genus: Ghatiana
- Species: G. atropurpurea

Binomial name
- Ghatiana atropurpurea Pati, Thackeray & Khaire, 2016

= Ghatiana atropurpurea =

Species of crab

Ghatiana atropurpurea is a species of arboreal crab from India that was first identified in 2016. Unlike other species of its genus, Ghatiana, it is not endemic to the Western Ghats.

== Description ==
G. atropurpurea has a deep purple carapace (resembling the color of the fruit Indian blackberry) and indigo or deep purple ambulatory legs. Chelipeds are light indigo. Surface of remaining portions such as the claw are light pink.

== Distribution ==
The species was first recorded from two localities Amboli (type locality) in the Sindhudurg district of Maharashtra, and Hathipal in South Goa district of Goa, which is approximately 110 km south of Amboli. There was also one sighting of the species from Amba Ghat in Kolhapur district, which is about 115 km north of Amboli. Later it was spotted in 2017 at the Sharavati valley in Shimoga. It was later found in Karwar in Uttara Kannada district in 2021.

== Behaviour and ecology ==
G. atropurpurea is partially arboreal, found in association mainly with the Indian blackberry plant. Some crabs were observed in tree holes containing rain water; however, none of them were observed foraging on open ground leaf litters or barks. Adult and sub-adult crabs of the Hathipal area were found in tree holes near the ground level whereas many juveniles gathered under small boulders or foraging on leaf litters. An adult female crab was also seen in a burrow under the crown of a large boulder. One freshly recruit crab was also noticed adjacent to an ephemeral stream, which had left its trail. True phytotelmy is therefore not achieved by G. atropurpurea. Individuals of this species were mainly seen during the heavy or frequent rainfall with or without fog and all day long. The feeding habits of G. atropurpurea are not precisely known. Local people of the Hathipal area mentioned about feeding on roadkills of snails and millipedes. During a night field visit, an adult crab was found in a small pond filled with tadpoles, which could also be a possible source of prey. Population size of this species appeared to be higher at Hathipal than at Amboli.

== Etymology ==
The specific epithet atropurpurea is derived from the Latin atropurpureus meaning 'dark purple', referring to the deep purple carapace of the crab resembling the Indian blackberry.
