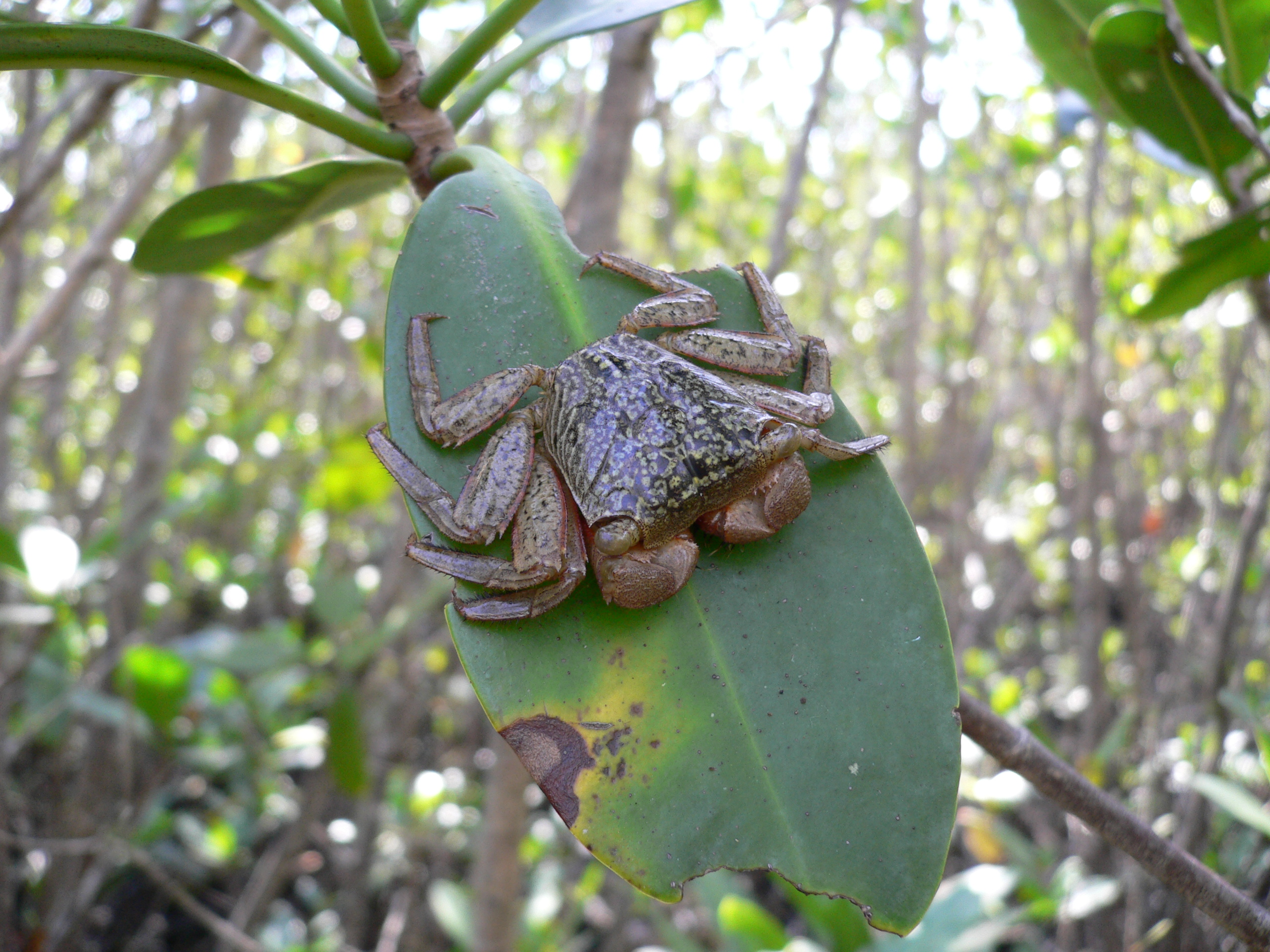

Conservation status
- Secure (NatureServe)

Scientific classification
- Kingdom: Animalia
- Phylum: Arthropoda
- Class: Malacostraca
- Order: Decapoda
- Suborder: Pleocyemata
- Infraorder: Brachyura
- Family: Sesarmidae
- Genus: Aratus
- Species: A. pisonii

Binomial name
- Aratus pisonii (H. Milne-Edwards, 1837)

Synonyms
- Sesarma pisonii H. Milne-Edwards, 1837

= Aratus pisonii =

Species of crab

Aratus pisonii, commonly known as the mangrove tree crab, is a species of crab which lives in mangrove trees in tropical and subtropical parts of the Americas, from Florida to Brazil on the Atlantic coast. A related species, A. pacificus, occurs from Nicaragua to Peru on the Pacific coast. A. pisoni feeds mostly on the leaves of the mangroves, but is an omnivore, and prefers animal matter when possible. A. pisonii and A. pacificus are the two species in the genus Aratus. The specific epithet pisonii commemorates the Dutch naturalist Willem Piso who travelled in Brazil in 1638 with Georg Marggraf.

== Description ==
The mangrove tree crab is a small species with males averaging about 2 cm (0.8 in) long and females slightly less. The large eyes are set far apart and the carapace is wider at the front than at the back. It is a mottled brown and olive colour which helps the crab to blend in with its surroundings. The legs are either brown or mottled and tufts of black hairs are near their tips. These are pointed, which aids the crab when climbing among the mangrove foliage.

== Distribution and habitat ==
The mangrove tree crab is found in tropical and semitropical regions along the coasts of North, Central, and South America. On the Atlantic side, its range extends from Florida to northern Brazil, including the whole Caribbean region. It lives primarily on the red mangrove Rhizophora mangle, but is also commonly seen on the white mangrove Laguncularia racemosa and the black mangrove Avicennia germinans, ascending the trees when the tide rises and descending to the exposed mud when the tide goes down.

== Ecology ==
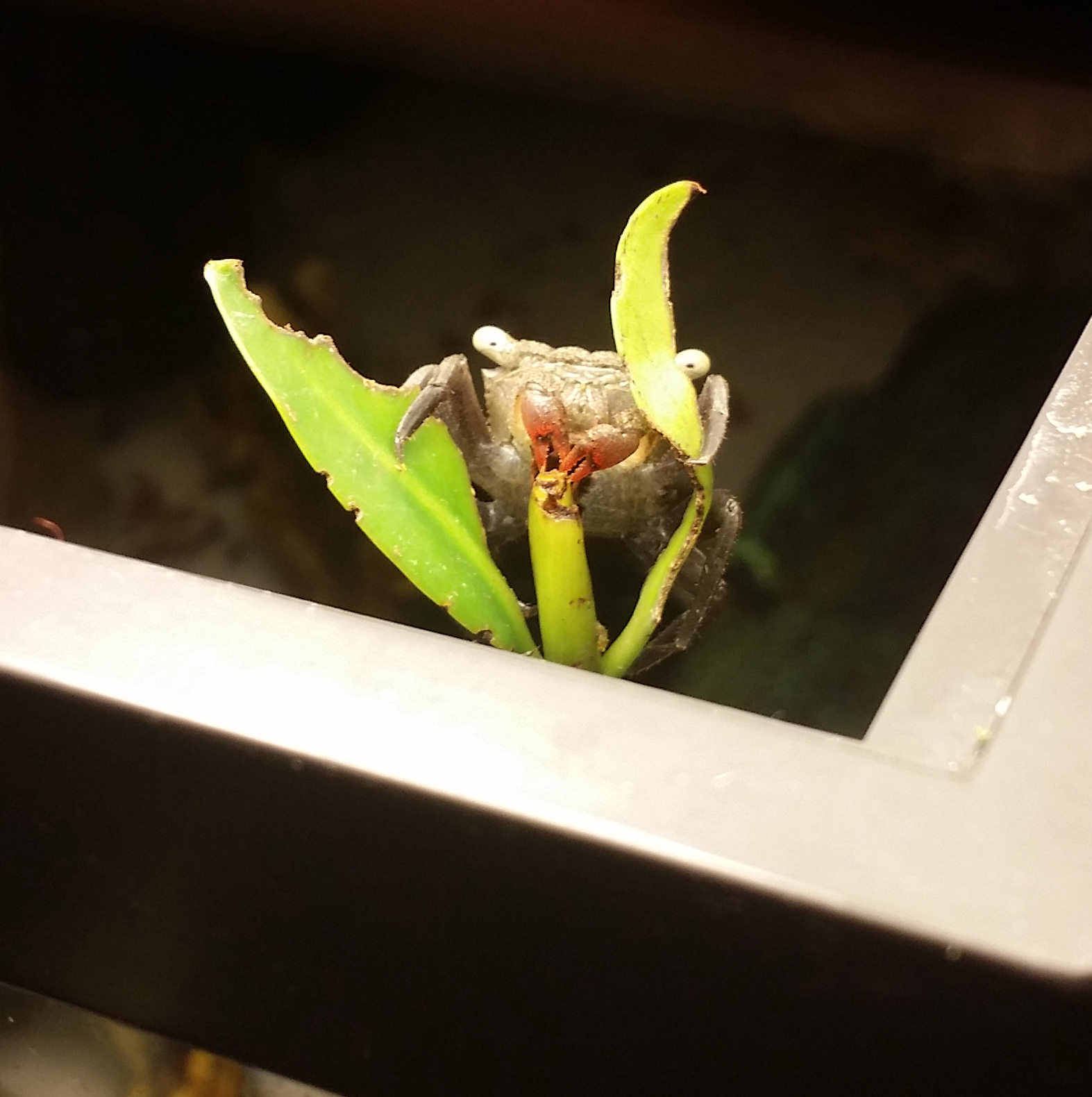
A. pisonii feeding on mangrove leaf

The mangrove tree crab is an omnivore, though the greatest part of its diet is the leaves of the mangrove trees on which it lives. It consumes the epidermis of the leaves and characteristic scraping marks show where it has fed. Even where this crab is uncommon, its consumption may constitute over 90% of the herbivory of mangrove leaves. It also eats organic debris and algae, and opportunistically feeds on carrion and small invertebrates including polychaete worms, nematodes, and foraminiferans. They also feed on the decaying tissues of the mangrove roots and on the feces of others of its species. In feeding trials, this crab was found to prefer animal food over plant food. This is unsurprising considering that mangrove leaves are of poor nutritional value, but what is surprising is the high proportion of leaf matter in the crabs' diet. This may be a response to the greater risk of predation in the water than in the canopy.

The mangrove tree crab is preyed on by birds, terrestrial mammals, and larger crabs. It is efficient at evading potential predators, as it can scuttle along branches at the rate of 1 m/sec and can leap to safety in the water below, but there it may become the victim of a predatory fish.

== Reproduction ==
In northern Brazil, breeding takes place over an extended period, but peaks in the rainy season. The female mangrove tree crab carries the fertilised eggs under her abdomen until they are ready to hatch. While they are there, she moves to the fringes of the mangrove area where conditions are better for the developing embryos and the release of the newly hatched larvae into the sea. The larvae pass through four zoeal stages and one megalopa stage as part of the plankton over the course of a month.
