= Salt marsh die-off =

Ecological disaster in low-elevation salt marshes

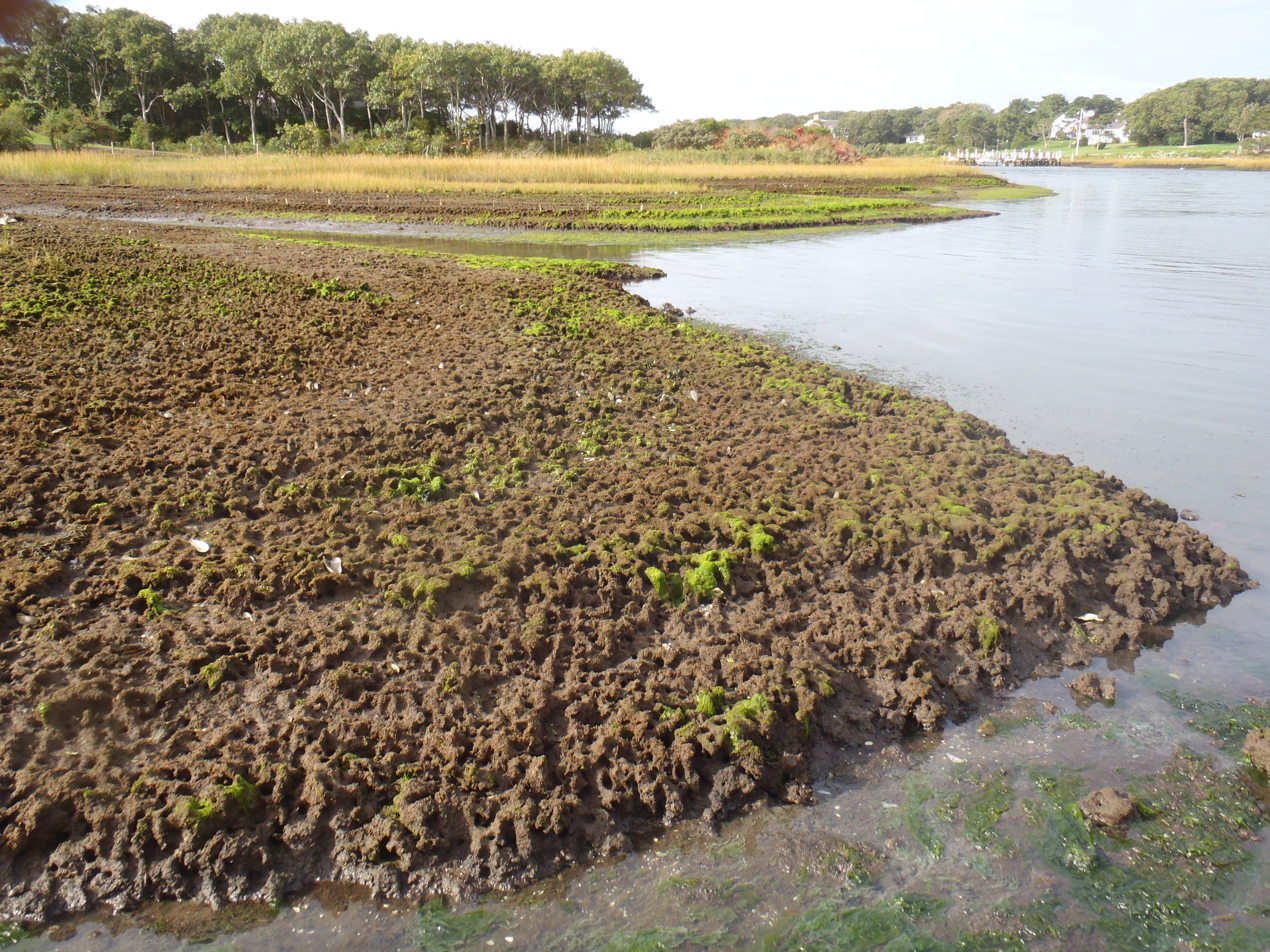
Salt marsh die-off in Saquatucket, Cape Cod, Massachusetts, USA

Salt marsh die-off is a term that has been used in the US and UK to describe the death of salt marsh cordgrass leading to subsequent degradation of habitat, specifically in the low marsh zones of salt marshes on the coasts of the Western Atlantic. Cordgrass normally anchors sediment in salt marshes; its loss leads to decreased substrate hardness, increased erosion, and collapse of creek banks into the water, ultimately resulting in decreased marsh health and productivity.

Die-off can affect several species of cordgrass (genus Spartina), including S. alterniflora, S. densiflora, and S. townsendii. There are several competing hypotheses predicting the causes and mechanisms of salt marsh die-off throughout the western Atlantic. These hypotheses place different emphasis on the effects of top-down or bottom-up processes for salt marsh die-off. Combined with salt marsh dieback of the high marsh, salt marsh die-off is a serious threat to the ecosystem services that marshes provide to local coastal communities.

== History of top-down vs. bottom-up ==
In light of their effect on community processes, behaviors, and ecological interactions, consumptive interactions are some of the most widely studied concepts in ecology. Because of this, scientists use food webs to depict all of the food chains and trophic relationships in an ecological community.

Example of a food web

Food webs can be controlled by bottom-up or top-down forces, which dictate whether a food web's structure and population dynamics are regulated by nutrients (a supply of fixed carbon) and primary production or by top predators, respectively.

Much energy is lost from one trophic level to the next (about 90%); therefore, the success of higher levels is linked to lower ones and their supply of resources (Lindeman 1942). However, the abundance and distribution of organisms in an ecosystem is also affected by densities of consumers, which limit the success of organisms at lower trophic levels and thereby influence the abundance of these organisms (Hairston et al. 1960).

Many ecologists argue that bottom-up and top-down control do not play equally critical roles in the structure and dynamics of populations in an ecosystem; however, data suggests that both bottom-up and top-down forces impact the structure of food webs and the spatial and temporal abundance and distribution of organisms (Bertness 2007), although to what extent each plays a role is not fully understood.

Historically, an emphasis on bottom-up control in many ecosystems has prevailed in ecological thought, often to the exclusion of consumer control (Strong 1992). Many ecosystems in which consumer control has classically been considered trivial are dominated by plants (e.g., forests, grasslands, and salt marshes) and are usually green in appearance. Hairston and colleagues proposed an opposing view in 1960 that emphasized consumer control. They argued that the “world is green” because higher trophic levels regulate herbivore abundance (Hairston et al. 1960).

Critics pointed out that the world is not always green, and that when it is, herbivores do not necessarily play an important role in structuring plant communities (Ehrlich and Birch 1967). Others argued that what is green is not always edible or of sufficiently high quality to allow increases in herbivore populations (Dixon 1966, Murdoch 1966). The debate is ongoing, but the dominant view of ecologists remains that although consumers affect many aspects of plant productivity and ecology, top-down control does not drive the productivity of entire plant ecosystems.

More recently, however, examples of conspicuous consumer control of entire ecosystems have emerged in a variety of habitats including lakes (Carpenter et al. 1985), rivers (Power 1992), and marine (Estes and Duggins 1995) habitats. Foundation plant species can be replaced with other species or substratum completely lacking vegetation and insects can defoliate whole mangroves (Feller 2002).

A classic example of top-down interactions dictating community structure and function comes from Bob Paine's work in Washington, which established that removal of the starfish Pisaster triggered a trophic cascade in which the blue mussel (Mytilus) populations exploded due to release from predation pressure (Paine 1966)

Another influential example of top-down control emerged from Jane Lubchenco's experiments on New England rocky shores, which demonstrated that the herbivorous snail L. littorea exerts control on the diversity and succession of tide pool algal communities (Lubchenco and Menge 1978). One hypothesis that arose from Lubchenco's work (Little and Kitching 1996) was that predation by the green crab (Carcinus maenas) influences rocky shore algal communities by regulating L. littorea abundances.

Ecologists cite these examples as evidence that consumer regulation is more potent and predominant than previously recognized.

== Historical paradigms of salt marsh theory ==
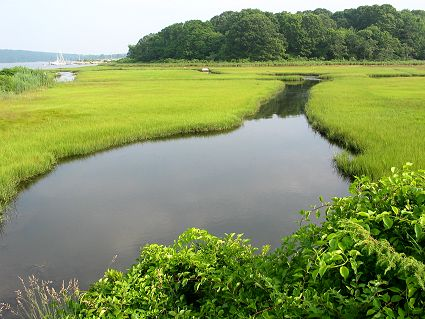
Healthy salt marsh

In salt marshes, early ecologists like Eugene Odum and John Teal sparked the current bottom-up paradigm in ecology through work on Sapelo Island, GA (U.S.A) that stressed the dominant role of physical factors like temperature, salinity, and nutrients in regulating plant primary productivity and ecosystem structure (Teal 1962, Odum 1971). Ecologists noted that marsh plants were not heavily grazed and appeared to be relatively unpalatable, and thus argued that most plants entered salt marsh food chains as detritus (Teal 1962). A corollary of this dogma is that consumers play an unimportant or subtle role in controlling salt marsh primary production (Smalley 1960, Teal 1962). This paradigm was widely accepted for decades and applied to other ecosystems like mangroves and seagrass beds (Bertness 2007), and has thus “become entrenched in the conceptual understanding of coastal ecosystems” (quote from Bertness and Silliman 2008; Smalley 1960, Nixon 1982).

Recent work, however, has demonstrated strong top-down control of plant communities in salt marshes by a wide variety of consumers, including snails, crabs, and geese (Jefferies 1997, Bortolus and Iribarne 1999, Silliman and Bertness 2002, Holdredge et al. 2009). Marsh grazers also include feral horses (Furbish and Albano 1994), cattle, hares, insects, and rodents, some of which are able to strongly suppress plant growth.

Strong top-down control on marshes has been demonstrated in various marsh systems. Consumer control is driven by the grapsid crab (Chasmagnathus granulata) in the salt marshes of Argentina and Brazil on the Atlantic coast of South America (Bortolus and Iribarne 1999). Other experiments in Argentina have contributed to the growing body of work evidencing consumer control in salt marshes (Alberti et al. 2007), and herbivory has also been suggested to play an important role in southwestern Atlantic marshes (Bortolus and Iribarne 1999, Alberti et al. 2007). Not only are consumers important on a small scale as demonstrated by cage experiments in various locations (Silliman and Zieman 2001, Silliman and Bertness 2002, Silliman et al. 2005), but they also affect primary productivity across large geographic areas (Silliman and Zieman 2001).

Bertness and Silliman have also suggested that while salt marshes may have historically been nutrient limited and bottom up controlled, human disturbances such as eutrophication and predator depletion has shifted these systems to top down control in recent decades (Bertness and Silliman 2008).

== Regional causes of salt marsh die-off ==
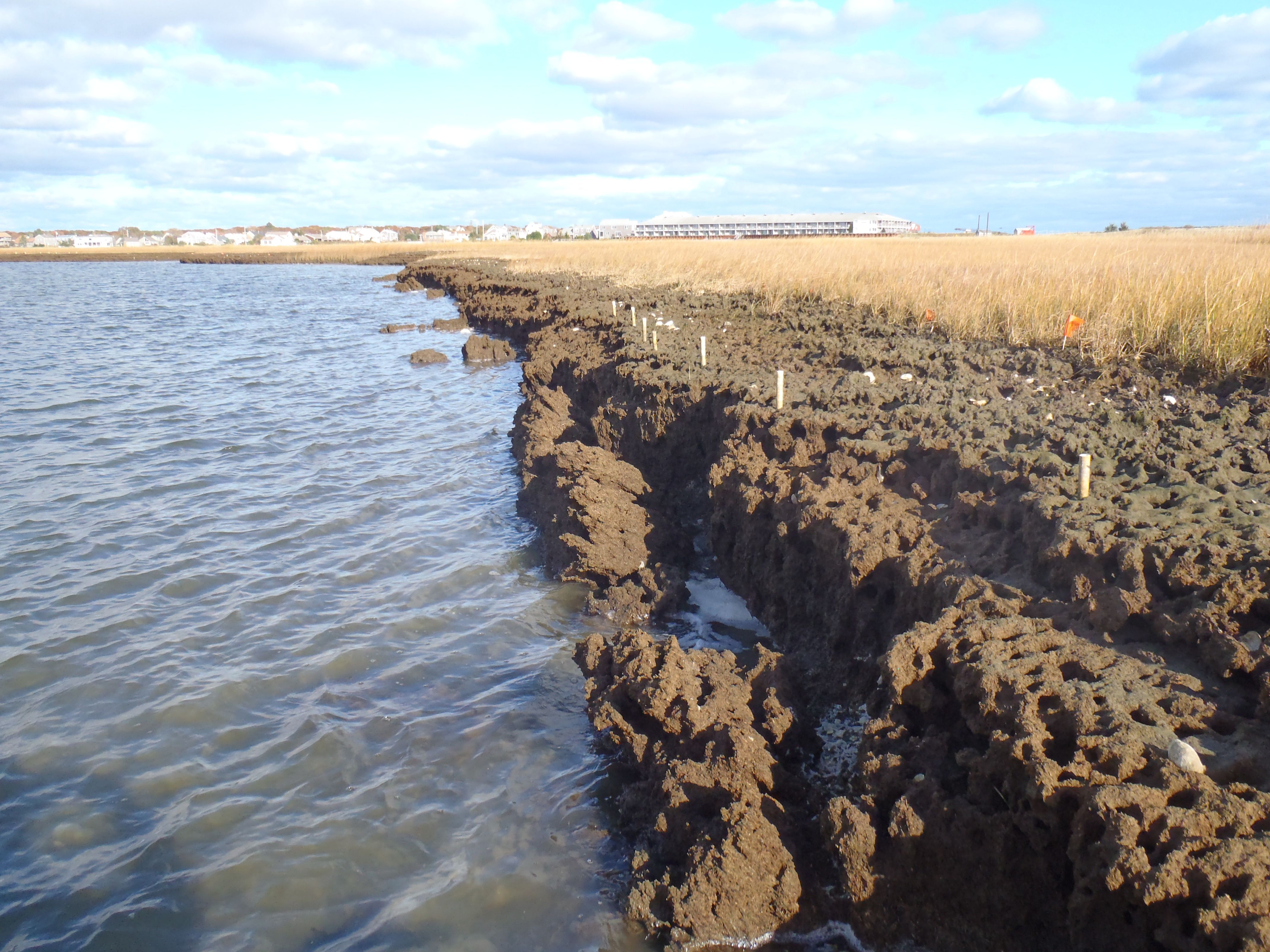
Calving creek bank of a marsh experiencing die-off in Cape Cod, Massachusetts

Both top-down and bottom-up forces have been proposed as primary drivers of salt marsh die-off throughout the western Atlantic. The relative importance of these factors depends on the abiotic and biotic conditions of each local or regional marsh system and its environment.

=== Top-down interactions ===
Human activities can trigger trophic cascades (Jefferies 1997), which occur when the predators that limit abundance of prey and thereby enhance survival of the next lower trophic level are depleted (Strong 1992). Depletion of top predators releases their prey from consumer control and leads to population declines of the next lower trophic level, often the primary producers. Trophic cascades occur across a minimum of three trophic levels and can impact community dynamics in a variety of systems (Estes et al. 1998). Trophic cascades can induce salt marsh die-off and transform green landscapes into barrens (Estes and Duggins 1995, Silliman et al. 2005). Primary triggers of trophic cascades through human action include introduction of invasive species, overexploitation, and climate change (Jackson et al. 2001, Lotze et al. 2006, Gedan et al. 2009, Gedan and Bertness 2011).

==== Invasive species ====
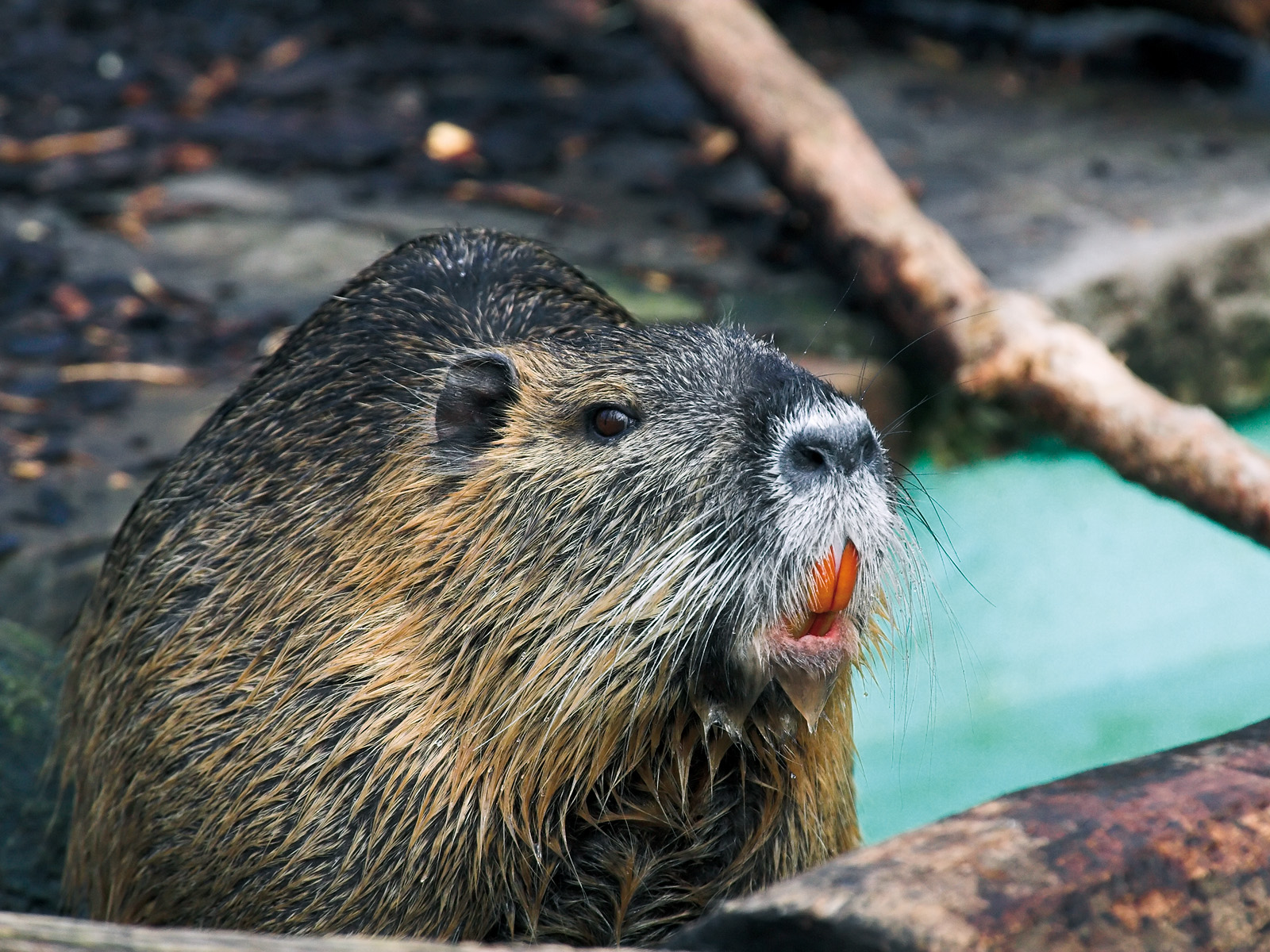
The invasive rodent, nutria, Myocastor coypus

Human introduction of non-native species can also contribute to top-down control of marsh systems (Furbish and Albano 1994, Gough and Grace 1998). Introduced feral horses on the barrier islands of Maryland, Virginia, and the Carolinas have entirely denuded marsh ecosystems (Furbish and Albano 1994), and the introduced rodent nutria on Gulf Coast marshes of Louisiana can decrease marsh plant primary production (Gough and Grace 1998).

The invasive green crab, Carcinus maenas, can turn off top down control by facilitating the recovery of salt marsh ecosystems. In marshes that have experienced die-off via the trophic cascade initiated by recreational overfishing, purple marsh crabs, Sesarma reticulatum, can be evicted by the larger green crabs, which prey upon the purple crab. In this way, green crabs can indirectly reduce purple crab herbivory and promotes cordgrass recovery. These results are encouraging because they suggest that invasive species, which are classically considered to have mostly negative impacts on the ecosystems they invade, can sometimes actually contribute to restoring degraded ecosystems.

==== Fungal ====
Die-off could potentially be explained by pathogens of salt marsh plants in some areas – fungal species have been identified at die-off sites in the UK as well as US Atlantic and Gulf coast sites (Elmer 2013). Fungal-facilitated marsh degradation is a documented concern in the Southeast Atlantic in particular. Marsh snails Littoraria irrorata make minor cuts in the cordgrass during grazing. These cuts facilitate growth of fungus, and at high snail densities, can lead to mass infections, increased grazing and consequent die-off (Silliman and Bertness 2002, Silliman and Newell 2003, Silliman et al. 2005).

In coastal New England, this evidence is weaker. Certain fungal pathogens of S. alterniflora were found more frequently in sites of die-off. These pathogens have varying degrees of virulence, and there is some evidence of association with species of Fusarium and areas of die-off. However, although the association suggests a partial causal link, particularly in stress-predisposed plants, strong evidence is lacking to suggest that such fungal pathogens are a major cause of die-off in New England (Elmer 2013).

==== Overexploitation ====
Overharvesting has led to the collapse of various shallow-water marine ecosystems around the globe (Jackson et al. 2001), including coral reefs (Hughes et al. 2003), sea grass beds, and kelp forests (Estes et al. 1998).

===== Commercial fishing =====
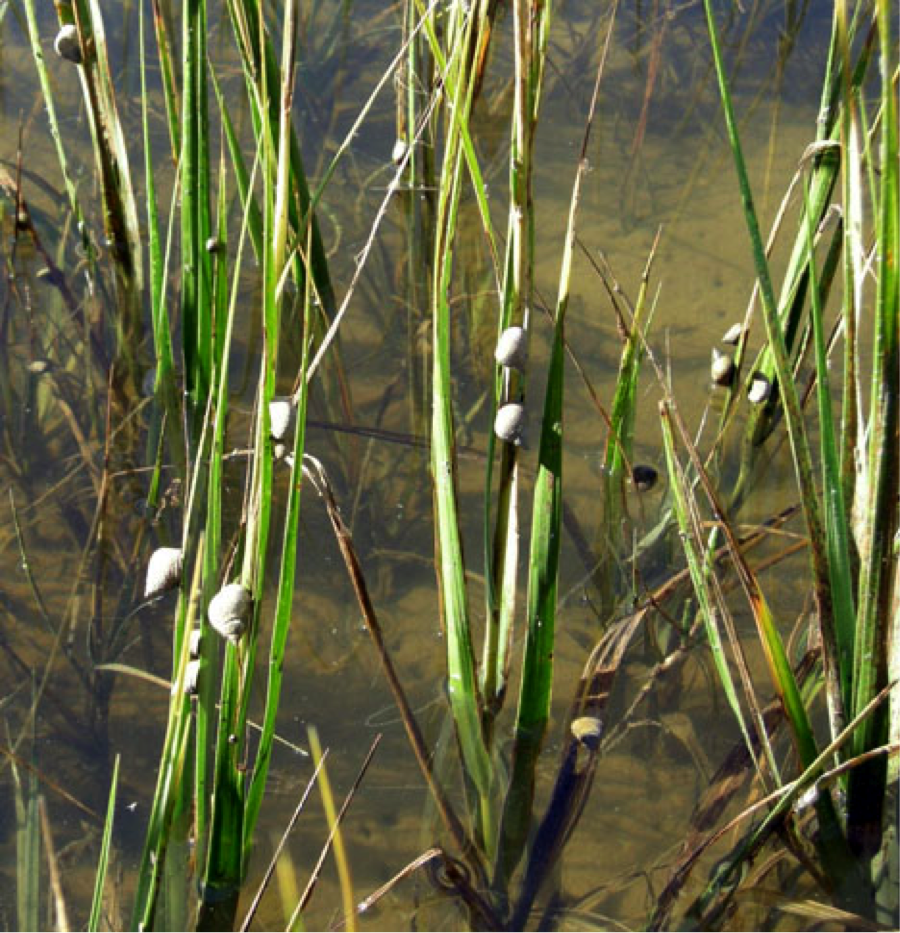
Marsh snail (L. irrorata) eats fungus on cordgrass, killing the plants

Research on the salt marsh snail Littoraria irrorata and its effects on marsh plant productivity, have provided strong evidence of consumer control in marshes triggered by overexploitation. This snail is capable of turning strands of cordgrass (Spartina alterniflora) (>2.5m tall) into mudflats within 8 months, which is less than one growing season (Silliman and Bertness 2002). As previously referenced, marsh snails inflict cuts on cordgrass leaves when they graze, providing substratum and nutrients for fungus. At high snail densities, cordgrass can succumb to fungal infections and marsh die-off can ensue (Silliman and Bertness 2002, Silliman and Newell 2003, Silliman et al. 2005). Natural predators of the marsh snail are blue crabs (Callinectes sapidus) and terrapin turtles (Malaclemys terrapin), which historically regulated snail abundances. However, these predators have been commercially overexploited, and now suffer from diseases due to small population size, releasing the snails from consumer pressure, and allowing the snails to wreak havoc on salt marsh cordgrass populations (Silliman and Zieman 2001).

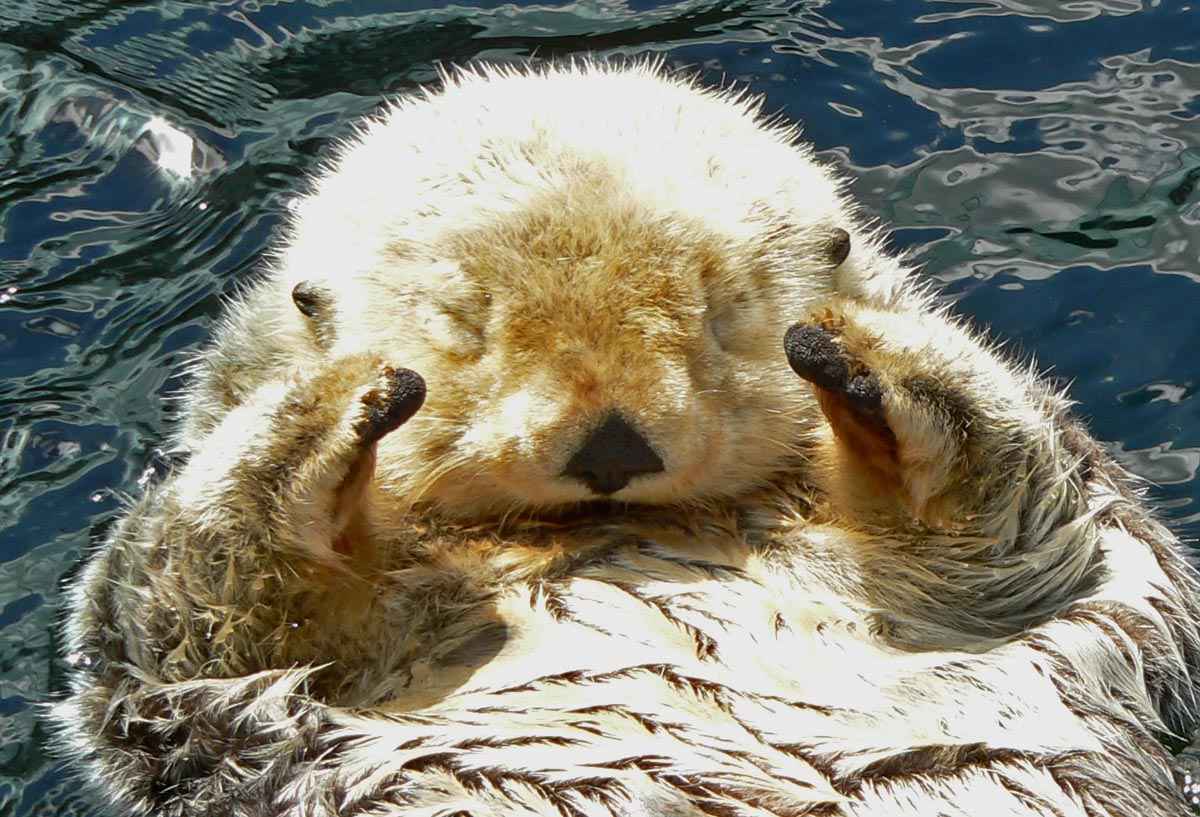
Sea otter

A classic example of a trophic cascade was caused by the overexploitation of sea otters in the 1980s (Estes & Duggins 1995). Sea otters eat urchins, which in turn graze on macroalgae in a food chain that, when altered, can lead to urchin barrens. Sea otters in Alaska were hunted to near extinction for their pelts. Where sea otter populations have persisted, they suppress the abundance of urchins and thus have an indirect positive effect on the density of macroalgae. In contrast, in sites where sea otters are absent, sea urchin populations have surged and caused urchin barrens to develop. Wherever sea otters have been reinstated, sea urchin populations have been reduced, and kelp densities have increased, returning the habitat to its original healthy state. This example demonstrates the potential for whole-ecosystem recovery with the reestablishment of consumers (Estes and Duggins 1995).

Other trophic cascades, such as those caused by crabs such as Chasmagnathus granulata in South America, are at least in part due to overfishing of top predators (Bortolus and Iribarne 1999, Alberti et al. 2007).

===== Recreational fishing =====
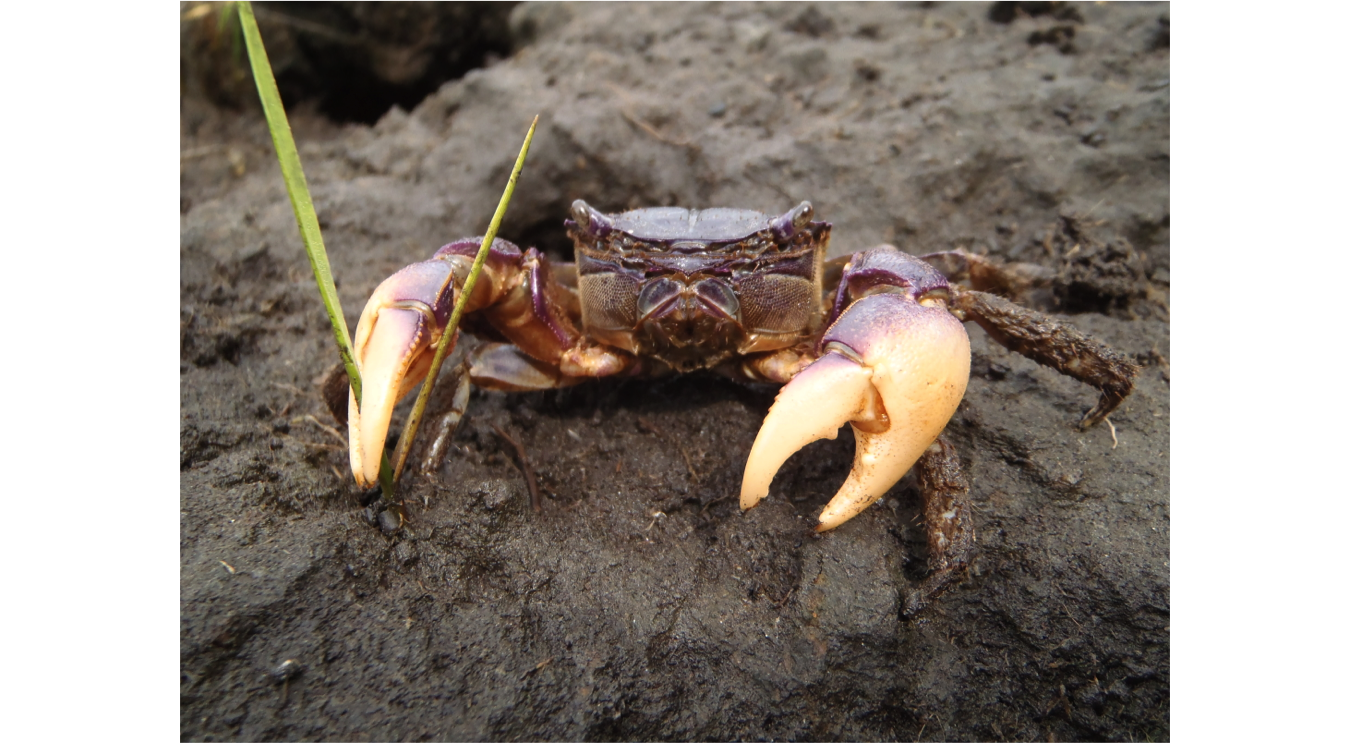
The purple marsh crab, Sesarma reticulatum

In New England, predator depletion has triggered extensive marsh die-off salt marsh creek banks. Herbivory has already impacted up to 90% of creek banks in more than 70% of outer Cape Cod marshes. Absent in 1997, die-off has recently spread into Narragansett Bay, Rhode Island, impacting over 85% of creek banks. The nocturnal purple marsh crab, Sesarma reticulatum, is playing a major role in this die-off through increased burrowing and herbivory due to release from predation pressure. Evidence has pointed to top-down control caused by human disturbances as the primary agent driving die-off.

Altieri and colleagues performed a series of experiments (Altieri et al. 2012) designed to elucidate the mechanisms driving marsh die-off more specifically. Sesarma crabs are normally preyed upon by blue crabs (Callinectes sapidus), and fish including striped bass (Morone saxatilis) and smooth dogfish (Mustelus canis). Although the cascading effects of overfishing have been demonstrated across various ecosystems (Myers and Worm 2003), research on predator depletion has focused almost exclusively on the impact of large-scale commercial overfishing (Worm et al. 2009). However, Altieri and colleagues (2012) demonstrated that the predators of Sesarma were, and continue to be, overexploited by recreational anglers. Their results show that die-off and vegetated marshes differed dramatically in recreational fishing pressure, as anglers were observed only at die-off sites.

Die-off marshes had half the biomass of top-level predators found at vegetated sites, while the biomass of nonharvested consumers did not differ between die-off and vegetated sites. Additionally, the predation rate on Sesarma at vegetated sites was triple that of die-off sites, and crabs consumed four times more grass at die-off sites than at vegetated sites. Historical reconstructions showed that little net marsh loss (<5%) from 1939 to 2005 occurred at currently vegetated sites. In contrast, die-off marshes exhibited the onset of die-off in the mid-70s, with consistently increasing vegetation loss through 2005, at which time >20% of the total marsh area was lost to die-off and >80% of the cordgrass zone was unvegetated. This divergence between die-off and vegetated marshes in vegetation loss coincides with a period of rapid increase in the number of docks and boat slips before the mid-70s that resulted in the establishment of >70% of that fishing infrastructure currently present at die-off marshes. These results provide evidence that Sesarma release from predation pressure by crabs and fish due to recreational overfishing by anglers is driving a trophic cascade that is responsible for extensive marsh die-off throughout southern New England (Altieri et al. 2012).

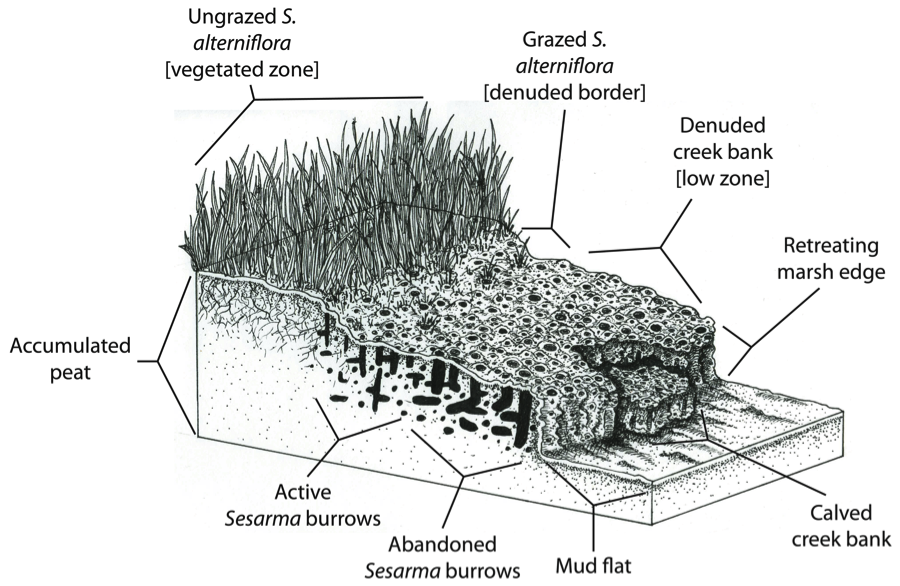
Denuded, eroding salt marsh creek bank

Altieri and colleagues (2012) further hypothesized that historic, large-scale, industrialized overexploitation of fish in the northwest Atlantic (Lotze et al. 2006) increased marsh vulnerability to the effects of localized recreational fishing to the point that large-scale die off ensued, and that resultant localized die-offs could coalesce into complete, region-wide marsh die-off if overexploitation of top consumers continues (Altieri et al. 2012).

Most recently, Bertness and colleagues (Bertness et al. 2014b) performed a field experiment excluding predators from plots on the grazing border of the marsh. Within one growing season, exclusion of top predators triggered die-off by increasing the abundances of Sesarma crabs and the intensity of herbivory. To further test the trophic cascade hypothesis, Bertness and colleagues used the spread of die-off into Narragansett Bay to assess all proposed drivers of die-off, including: 1) eutrophication decreases plant investment into belowground biomass causing plant collapse, 2) boat wakes erode creek banks, 3) pollution or disease affect plant health, 4) substrate hardness controls herbivorous crab distributions and 5) trophic dysfunction releases Sesarma from predator control. Nitrogen availability, wave intensity and plant growth did not explain any variation in die-off. However, herbivory explained over 70% of inter-site variation in die-off. (Bertness et al. 2014a) This work highlighted one particular example where top-down interactions were experimentally shown to be the primary driver of ecological community state change.

=== Bottom-up interactions ===
==== Hypersaline and anoxic soils ====
One theory of bottom-up control lies with differential soil chemistry between vegetated and die-off areas. Drought-associated changes in soil chemistry have been proposed to be associated with areas of die-off. Droughts are often associated with increased salinity and acidity stress – soils oxidize under freshwater or tidal moisture limitation, leading to increased acidity. Hypersalinity has been linked to reduced S. alterniflora survival (Brown et al. 2005). However, salt marsh plants are generally tolerant of a broad range of salinity levels, and increased salinity has not consistently been observed in die-off sites (Alber et al. 2008).

There is uncertainty attributed to the link between different soil conditions and sites of die-off for several reasons. First, measurements may not be taken in frequent enough intervals to capture brief fluctuations in soil conditions associated with die-off. Second, attributing causation with changing soil conditions and die-off is potentially dubious. Reverse causality is a potential explanation; that is, soil chemistry differences may be a result rather than an agent of die-off. For instance, one study noted higher salinity levels in die-off areas in some months, but this was possibly attributable to altered root or evaporation dynamics due to die-off (Marsh 2007).

==== Eutrophication ====
Nutrient enrichment is a pervasive global threat to both marine and terrestrial ecosystems (Galloway et al. 2008, Verhoeven et al. 2006). In marine ecosystems, increased flow of nitrogen can trigger severe algal blooms, anoxic conditions, and widespread fisheries losses (Diaz & Rosenberg 2008). In salt marshes, an important interface ecosystem between land and sea, nutrient addition has been hypothesized to contribute to widespread creek die-offs (Deegan et al. 2012).

To test this hypothesis, Linda Deegan and colleagues performed a nine-year study at one site in Massachusetts. The researchers found that tidal creek enrichment of nitrogen and phosphorus led to decreased investment in belowground nutrient gathering roots and rhizomes, increased microbial decomposition of organic matter, and eventual creek collapse and salt marsh loss (Deegan et al. 2012).

Similar studies in Connecticut, however, have been unable to replicate these findings. Shimon Anisfeld and Troy Hill performed a 5-year fertilization experiment of a salt marsh in Long Island Sound and found that neither nitrogen nor phosphorus fertilization led to elevation loss, reduced soil carbon, or a decrease in belowground primary production. They suggest that high nutrient levels can significantly alter marsh processes and increase gross carbon loss from sediment but that other processes may compensate for these impacts. No net deleterious effects of nutrient loading on carbon storage or on marsh stability are anticipated from this study (Anisfeld and Hill 2012).

Other eutrophication studies performed in Narragansett Bay, Rhode Island found that experimental nitrogen addition initially increases plant productivity but eventually leads to reduced plant biomass due to insect herbivory (Bertness et al. 2008). To supplement this experiment, researchers took surveys across 20 salt marshes to look at the interaction between marsh nutrient levels and herbivore pressure and found that marsh nitrogen supply was a good predictor of herbivore damage to plants. This study suggests that eutrophication is currently triggering consumer suppression of primary productivity in New England salt marshes and may eventually pose a threat to salt marsh ecosystem service provisioning (Bertness et al. 2008).

==== Potential for Synergistic effects ====
Coastal ecosystems suffer from a variety of anthropogenic impacts, such as large-scale eutrophication, food web alteration, runaway consumer effects, climate change, habitat destruction, and disease. Rarely do these factors act in isolated ways. Often, researchers find additive or synergistic interactions between impacts compounding the amount of ecosystem degradation. One such example is found in salt marshes in the southeastern United States. Depletion of top predators in these systems has led to snail overgrazing of salt marsh cordgrass and subsequent die-off (as explained above). However, this die-off has been linked with intense drought conditions and the resultant increases in salt and acid stress (Silliman et al. 2005). Drought stress that raises soil salinities and increases cordgrass vulnerabilities to top-down control may be a product of climate change (Silliman and Bertness 2002, Silliman et al. 2005). Cases such as these highlight how abiotic and biotic interactions can interact to affect ecosystem health.

Anthropogenic actions also can cause eutrophication, or increase the nutrient load, of marine ecosystems, through runoff into the system containing fertilizer, sewage, dishwasher soap, and other nitrogen- and phosphorus-rich substances. Eutrophication is pervasive in coastal marine ecosystems (Lotze et al. 2006) and can indirectly initiate trophic cascades and increase consumer control of plants. For example, insect herbivory in marshes has been positively correlated with nutrient availability in Atlantic salt marshes (Bertness et al. 2008). In Narragansett Bay, insect herbivory suppresses primary production of human disturbed salt marshes by almost 40%. Nitrogen additions through human activity can increase insect herbivory so much that primary production is suppressed by nearly 60%, while marshes without human shoreline development remain solely under bottom-up control (Bertness et al. 2008). Increased nutrient supply can lead to runaway herbivory in other systems as well (Gough and Grace 1998, Silliman and Zieman 2001).

For example, eutrophication initiates top-down control via the impact of snow geese on the arctic marshes of Hudson Bay (Jefferies 1997). By the 1980s, the snow geese that originally annually migrated to Hudson Bay had switched from feeding in temperate wetlands to feeding in heavily fertilized agricultural fields. Over a period of 30 years, the geese population exploded. Snow geese have since utterly destroyed hundreds of thousands of acres of the Hudson Bay wetland. The geese grubbed marsh plant roots, evaporation increased leading to subsequent salinity increase, and without plants to oxygenate the soil the substrate became anoxic. This undesirable environment for marsh plants disallows sexual recruitment to the area. Snow geese have denuded the marsh until recolonization by clonal runners can restore marsh vegetation, which could take years. Because of the use of artificial fertilizers on temperate zone agricultural fields, a trophic cascade was initiated (Jefferies 1997).

A major goal of ecology over the next century will be to understand how ecosystems will respond to current and future human impacts and the additive or synergistic interactions between them.

== Management implications and conservation ==
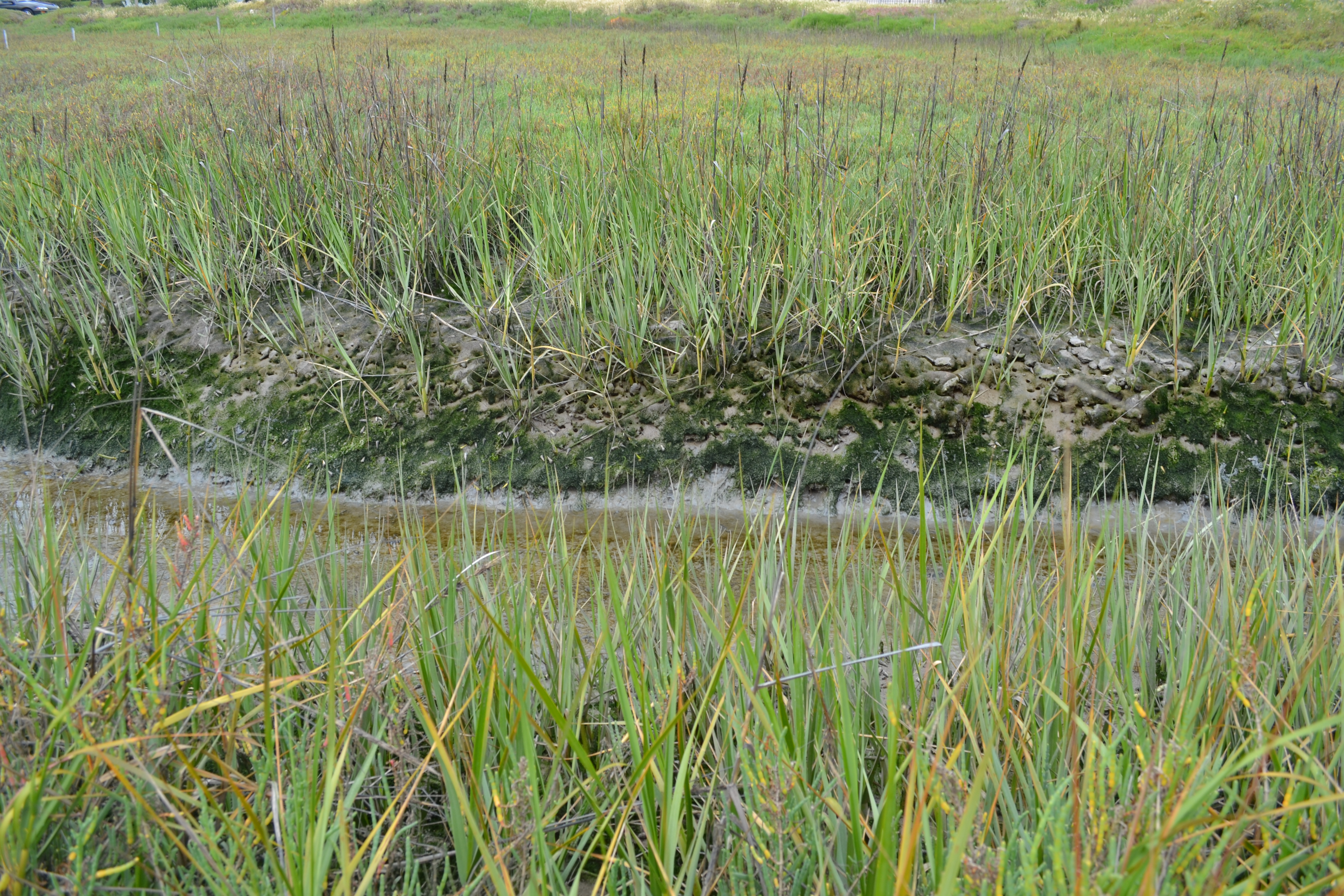
Cordgrass binds sediment, attenuates waves and prevents shoreline erosion

Ecosystem services are the benefits that humans derive from ecological systems. Today, one of the arguments for protecting salt marshes is to increase the quality and quantity of these services. Salt marshes sequester nitrogen, filtering runoff water and reducing nitrogen input to estuaries (Valiela and Cole 2002). Salt marshes also provide essential refuge habitat for young fish and crustaceans, provisioning coastal fisheries (Boesch and Turner 1984) that account for 90% of the world's fish catch (UNEP 2006). Salt marshes also sequester carbon, which will be an important ecosystem service as climate change intensifies (Chmura et al. 2003). Arguably the most important ecosystem service salt marshes provide is to act as natural sea barriers because grasses bind soils, prevent shoreline erosion, attenuate waves, and reduce coastal flooding (Costanza et al. 2008).

However, the marsh's natural ability to buffer against erosion and flooding may be reduced by creek bank die-off. Since Spartina alterniflora is responsible for sediment binding and peat deposition (Redfield 1965), cordgrass die-off may compromise the ability of salt marshes to keep pace with sea-level rise. Also, the concentration of Sesarma burrows in New England salt marsh peat may directly trigger the erosion and collapse of the peat foundation of marshes.

On Cape Cod, marsh creek banks are often so riddled with Sesarma burrows that they collapse, exposing fresh peat to further burrowing and erosion (Bertness et al. 2008). Feedbacks between crab herbivory and cordgrass die-off may thus lead to the retreat of marsh edges. For example, Coverdale and colleagues found that 20 years of die-off on Cape Cod have resulted in the loss of over 200 years of marsh accretion and hundreds of acres of marsh loss. The detrimental effects trophic cascades have had on marshes not only reduce the biodiversity, health, and aesthetic appeal of these ecosystems, but also compromise the ability of marshes to provide key ecosystem services to human populations.

== Conclusions ==
Despite mounting evidence to the contrary, bottom-up control remains the central dogma determining marsh management, conservation and restoration efforts. Salt marshes are currently managed as if they are exclusively regulated by physical factors. However, global and near shore top predator depletion leading to the release of cryptic or unappreciated herbivores may be the biggest current threat to salt marshes. Theory dependency (subconscious favoring of identifying and/or examining natural phenomena that tend to confirm rather than refute the current paradigm of a study system [Kuhn 1962]) and demonstration, rather than falsifying science, have been the leading culprits in this oversight. Consequently, threats to salt marshes that are governed by top down control are being overlooked, with potentially devastating consequences.

Trophic cascades are powerful interactions that strongly regulate biodiversity, community structure, and ecosystem function. Trophic cascades were originally thought to be rare, but it has become clear that they occur across diverse terrestrial, freshwater, and marine ecosystems at both small and large spatial and temporal scales. Trophic cascades are common and pervasive aspects of many communities long thought to be controlled by bottom-up forces and/or resistant to consumer control.

Conservation of ecosystems affected by trophic cascades has thus not adequately incorporated top-down control into their management and restoration plans and efforts, but emerging research has emphasized that this is necessary to protect the services provided by these ecosystems and to restore these ecosystems to their original conditions. Failure to do so could lead to trophic cascades transforming highly diverse and productive plant communities to barren flats.

Additionally, failure to reevaluate the current paradigm and recognize that both bottom-up and top-down forces affect many features of ecosystem structure and function, and that these forces are complementary rather than contradictory, could bar any incorporation of both mechanisms into any management plan and reduce the success of conservation efforts before they even begin.
