= Salt marsh =

Coastal ecosystem between land and open saltwater that is regularly flooded

Elements of a salt marsh and how they relate to the tides. Open with the play button, then scroll to change the tide.

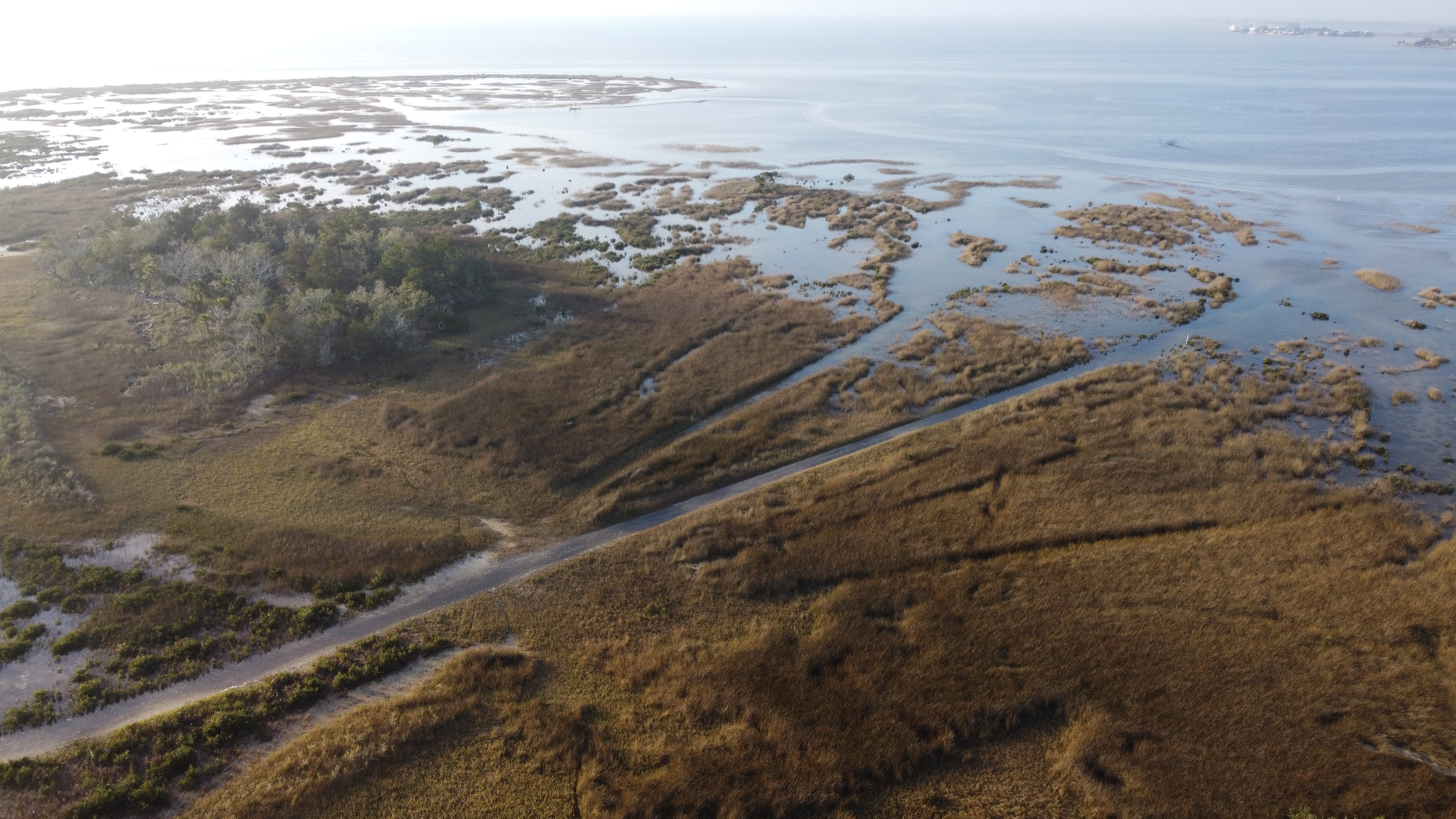
A coastal salt marsh in Perry, Florida, USA.

A salt marsh, saltmarsh or salting, also known as a coastal marsh, is a tidal wetland in the upper coastal intertidal zone between land and sea that is regularly flooded by tides of seawater or brackish water. It is a unique marine coastal ecosystem dominated by dense stands of salt-tolerant plants such as herbs, grasses, or low shrubs. These plants are terrestrial in origin and are essential to the stability of the salt marsh in trapping and binding sediments. Salt marshes play a large role in the aquatic food web and the delivery of nutrients to coastal waters. They also support terrestrial animals and provide coastal protection.

Salt marshes have historically been endangered by poorly implemented coastal management practices, with land reclaimed for human uses or polluted by upstream agriculture or other industrial coastal uses. Additionally, sea level rise caused by climate change is endangering other marshes, through erosion and submersion of otherwise tidal marshes. However, recent acknowledgment by both environmentalists and larger society for the importance of saltwater marshes for biodiversity, ecological productivity and other ecosystem services, such as carbon sequestration, have led to an increase in salt marsh restoration and management since the 1980s.

== Basic information ==
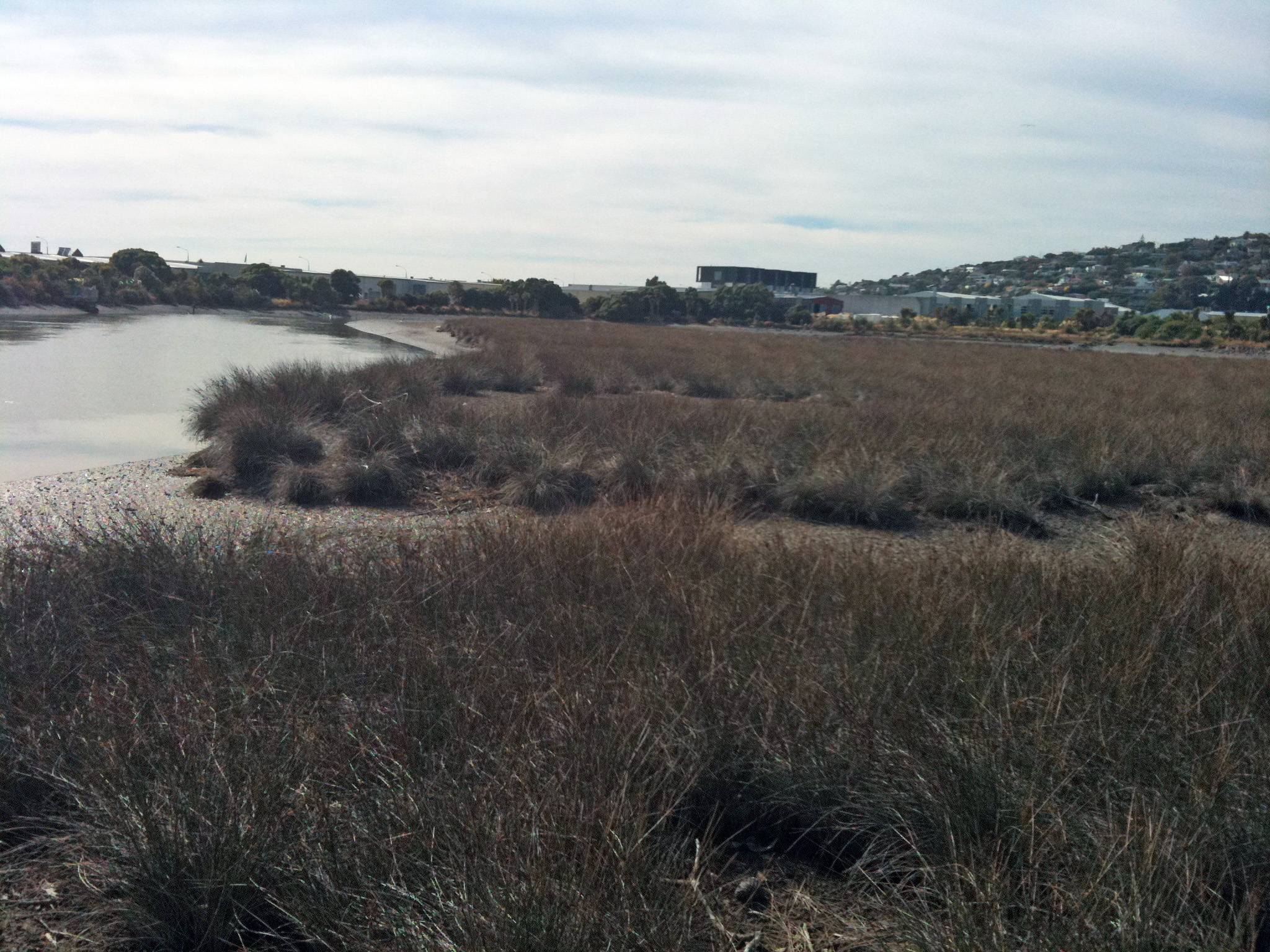
An estuarine salt marsh along the Ōpāwaho / Heathcote River, Christchurch, New Zealand

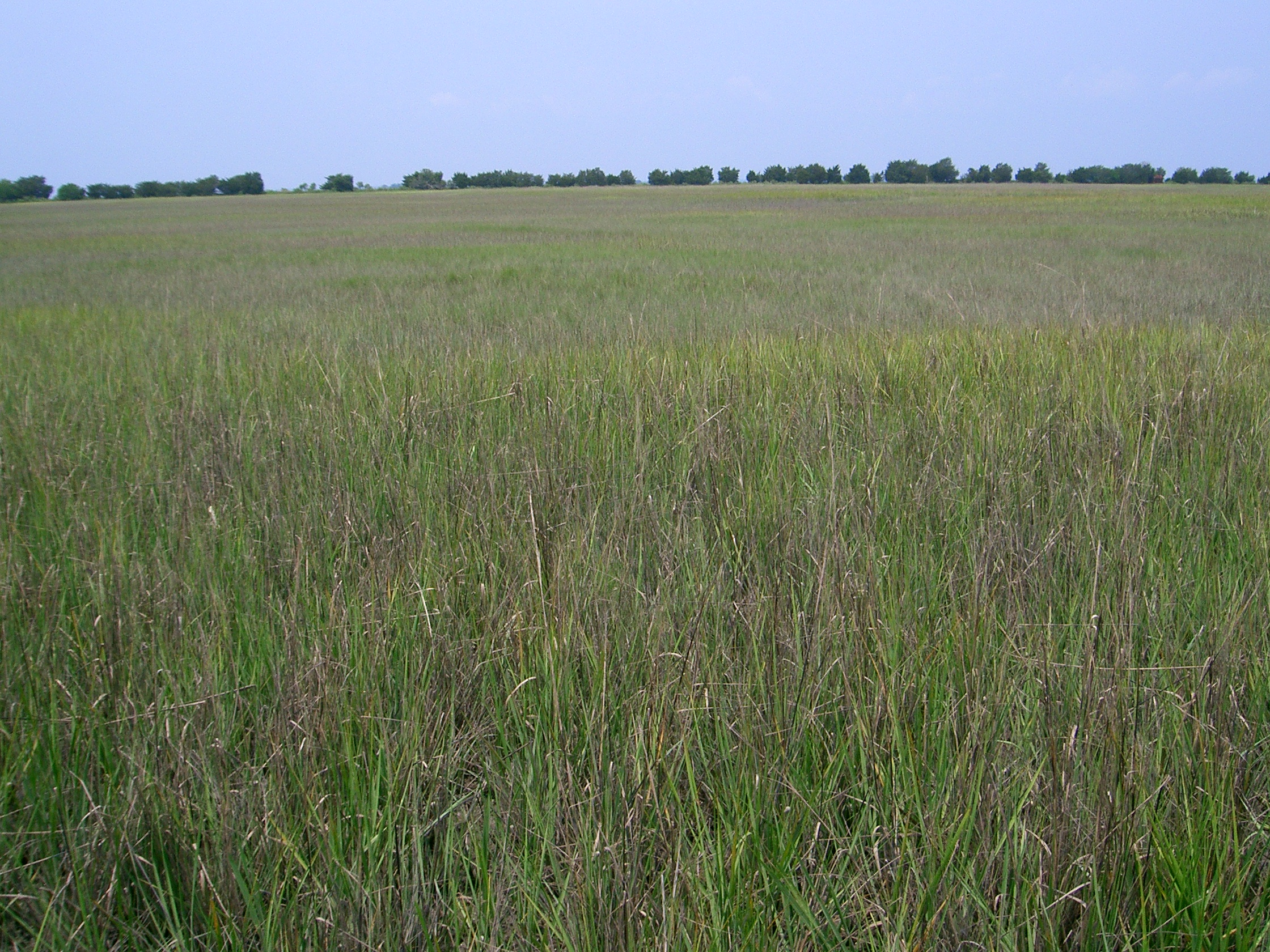
Salt marsh on Sapelo Island, Georgia, US

Salt marshes occur on low-energy shorelines in temperate and high-latitudes which can be stable, emerging, or submerging depending if the sedimentation is greater, equal to, or lower than relative sea level rise (subsidence rate plus sea level change), respectively. Commonly these shorelines consist of mud or sand flats (known also as tidal flats or mudflats) which are nourished with sediment from inflowing rivers and streams. These typically include sheltered environments such as embankments, estuaries and the leeward side of barrier islands and spits. In the tropics and sub-tropics they are replaced by mangroves; an area that differs from a salt marsh in that instead of herbaceous plants, they are dominated by salt-tolerant trees.

Most salt marshes have a low topography with low elevations but a vast wide area, making them hugely popular for human populations. Salt marshes are located among different landforms based on their physical and geomorphological settings. Such marsh landforms include deltaic marshes, estuarine, back-barrier, open coast, embayments and drowned-valley marshes. Deltaic marshes are associated with large rivers where many occur in Southern Europe such as the Camargue, France in the Rhône delta or the Ebro delta in Spain. They are also extensive within the rivers of the Mississippi River Delta in the United States. In New Zealand, most salt marshes occur at the head of estuaries in areas where there is little wave action and high sedimentation. Such marshes are located in Awhitu Regional Park in Auckland, the Manawatū Estuary, and the Avon Heathcote Estuary / Ihutai in Christchurch. Back-barrier marshes are sensitive to the reshaping of barriers in the landward side of which they have been formed. They are common along much of the eastern coast of the United States and the Frisian Islands, as part of the Wadden Sea. The Wadden Sea is considered as one of the world’s largest continuous wetland system and contains nearly 40,000 hectares of salt marshes, accounting for approximately 20% of Europe’s coastal salt marshes. Around half of these are located in foreland areas along the mainland coast, making them particularly exposed to marine dynamics. The foreland itself is categorized as the area from the mean high tide until the dike foot and covers parts of the colonization zone and the salt marsh. Saltmarshes of the dike foreland lay over mean high tide and get only seldomly get inundated by salt water, especially during storm surges in winter. Large, shallow coastal embayments can hold salt marshes with examples including Morecambe Bay and Portsmouth in Britain and the Bay of Fundy in North America.

Salt marshes are sometimes included in lagoons, and the difference is not very marked; the Venetian Lagoon in Italy, for example, is made up of these sorts of animals and or living organisms belonging to this ecosystem. They have a big impact on the biodiversity of the area. Salt marsh ecology involves complex food webs which include primary producers (vascular plants, macroalgae, diatoms, epiphytes, and phytoplankton), primary consumers (zooplankton, macrozoa, molluscs, insects), and secondary consumers.

The low physical energy and high grasses provide a refuge for animals. Many marine fish use salt marshes as nursery grounds for their young before they move to open waters. Birds may raise their young among the high grasses, because the marsh provides both sanctuary from predators and abundant food sources which include fish trapped in pools, insects, shellfish, and worms.

== Worldwide occurrence ==
Saltmarshes across 99 countries (essentially worldwide) were mapped by Mcowen et al. 2017. A total of 5,495,089 hectares of mapped saltmarsh across 43 countries and territories are represented in a Geographic Information Systems polygon shapefile. This estimate is at the relatively low end of previous estimates (2.2–40 Mha). A later study conservatively estimated global saltmarsh extent as 90,800 km^{2} (9,080,000 hectares). The most extensive saltmarshes worldwide are found outside the tropics, notably including the low-lying, ice-free coasts, bays and estuaries of the North Atlantic which are well represented in their global polygon dataset.

== Formation ==
The formation begins as tidal flats gain elevation relative to sea level by sediment accretion, and subsequently the rate and duration of tidal flooding decreases so that vegetation can colonize on the exposed surface. The arrival of propagules of pioneer species such as seeds or rhizome portions are combined with the development of suitable conditions for their germination and establishment in the process of colonisation. When rivers and streams arrive at the low gradient of the tidal flats, the discharge rate reduces and suspended sediment settles onto the tidal flat surface, helped by the backwater effect of the rising tide. Mats of filamentous blue-green algae can fix silt and clay sized sediment particles to their sticky sheaths on contact which can also increase the erosion resistance of the sediments. This assists the process of sediment accretion to allow colonising species (e.g., Salicornia spp.) to grow. These species retain sediment washed in from the rising tide around their stems and leaves and form low muddy mounds which eventually coalesce to form depositional terraces, whose upward growth is aided by a sub-surface root network which binds the sediment. Once vegetation is established on depositional terraces further sediment trapping and accretion can allow rapid upward growth of the marsh surface such that there is an associated rapid decrease in the depth and duration of tidal flooding. As a result, competitive species that prefer higher elevations relative to sea level can inhabit the area and often a succession of plant communities develops.

== Tidal flooding and vegetation zonation ==
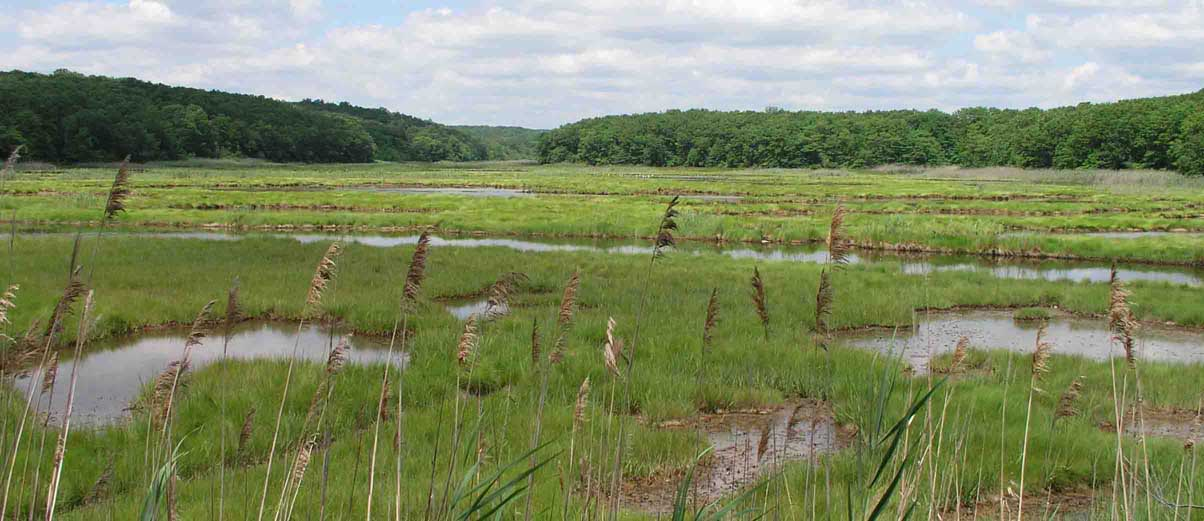
An Atlantic coastal salt marsh in Connecticut

Coastal salt marshes can be distinguished from terrestrial habitats by the daily tidal flow that occurs and continuously floods the area. It is an important process in delivering sediments, nutrients and plant water supply to the marsh. At higher elevations in the upper marsh zone, there is much less tidal inflow, resulting in lower salinity levels. Soil salinity in the lower marsh zone is fairly constant due to everyday annual tidal flow. However, in the upper marsh, variability in salinity is shown as a result of less frequent flooding and climate variations. Rainfall can reduce salinity and evapotranspiration can increase levels during dry periods. As a result, there are microhabitats populated by different species of flora and fauna dependent on their physiological abilities. The flora of a salt marsh is differentiated into levels according to the plants' individual tolerance of salinity and water table levels. Vegetation found at the water must be able to survive high salt concentrations, periodical submersion, and a certain amount of water movement, while plants further inland in the marsh can sometimes experience dry, low-nutrient conditions. It has been found that the upper marsh zones limit species through competition and the lack of habitat protection, while lower marsh zones are determined through the ability of plants to tolerate physiological stresses such as salinity, water submergence and low oxygen levels.

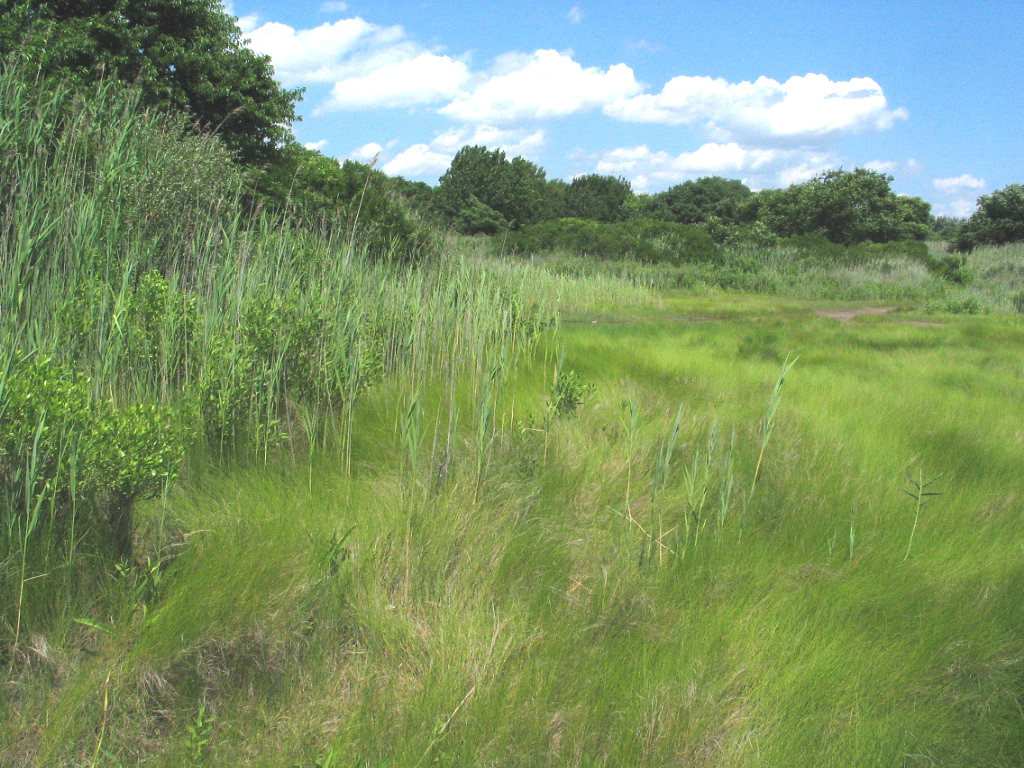
High marsh in the Marine Park Salt Marsh Nature Center in Brooklyn, New York

The New England salt marsh is subject to strong tidal influences and shows distinct patterns of zonation. In low marsh areas with high tidal flooding, a monoculture of the smooth cordgrass, Spartina alterniflora dominate, then heading landwards, zones of the salt hay, Spartina patens, black rush, Juncus gerardii and the shrub Iva frutescens are seen respectively. These species all have different tolerances that make the different zones along the marsh best suited for each individual.

Plant species diversity is relatively low, since the flora must be tolerant of salt, complete or partial submersion, and anoxic mud substrate. The most common salt marsh plants are glassworts (Salicornia spp.) and the cordgrass (Spartina spp.), which have worldwide distribution. They are often the first plants to take hold in a mudflat and begin its ecological succession into a salt marsh. Their shoots lift the main flow of the tide above the mud surface while their roots spread into the substrate and stabilize the sticky mud and carry oxygen into it so that other plants can establish themselves as well. Plants such as sea lavenders (Limonium spp.), plantains (Plantago spp.), and varied sedges and rushes grow once the mud has been vegetated by the pioneer species.

Salt marshes are quite photosynthetically active and are extremely productive habitats. They serve as depositories for a large amount of organic matter. Decomposition of this organic matter feeds a broad food chain of organisms from bacteria to mammals. Many of the halophytic plants such as cordgrass are not grazed at all by higher animals but die off and decompose to become food for micro-organisms, which in turn become food for fish and birds.

== Sediment trapping, accretion, and the role of tidal creeks ==
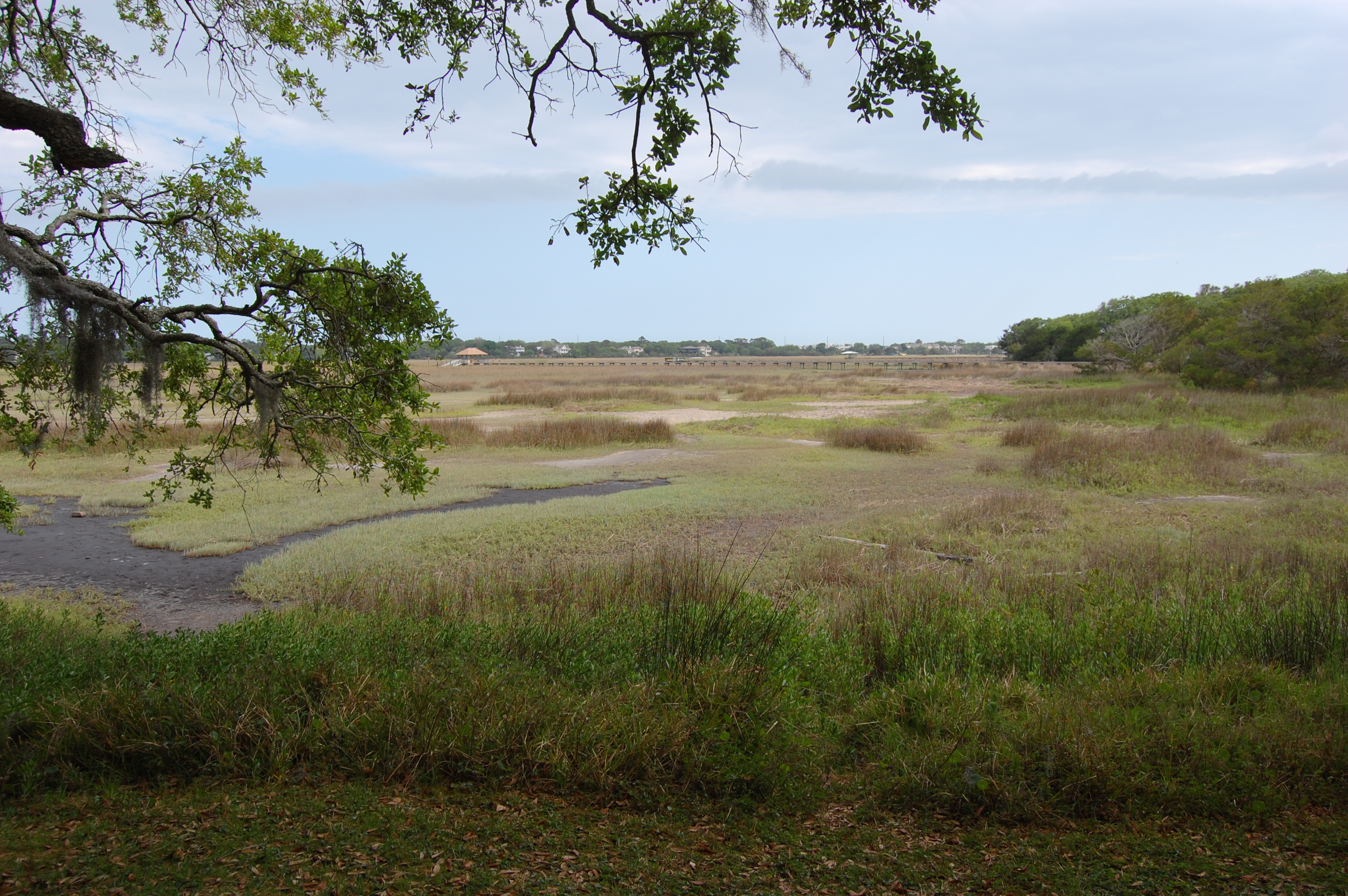
Bloody Marsh in Georgia, US

The factors and processes that influence the rate and spatial distribution of sediment accretion within the salt marsh are numerous. Sediment deposition can occur when marsh species provide a surface for the sediment to adhere to, followed by deposition onto the marsh surface when the sediment flakes off at low tide. The amount of sediment adhering to salt marsh species is dependent on the type of marsh species, the proximity of the species to the sediment supply, the amount of plant biomass, and the elevation of the species. For example, in a study of the Eastern Chongming Island and Jiuduansha Island tidal marshes at the mouth of the Yangtze River, China, the amount of sediment adhering to the species Spartina alterniflora, Phragmites australis, and Scirpus mariqueter decreased with distance from the highest levels of suspended sediment concentrations (found at the marsh edge bordering tidal creeks or the mudflats); decreased with those species at the highest elevations, which experienced the lowest frequency and depth of tidal inundations; and increased with increasing plant biomass. Spartina alterniflora, which had the most sediment adhering to it, may contribute >10% of the total marsh surface sediment accretion by this process.

Salt marsh species also facilitate sediment accretion by decreasing current velocities and encouraging sediment to settle out of suspension. Current velocities can be reduced as the stems of tall marsh species induce hydraulic drag, with the effect of minimising re-suspension of sediment and encouraging deposition. Measured concentrations of suspended sediment in the water column have been shown to decrease from the open water or tidal creeks adjacent to the marsh edge, to the marsh interior, probably as a result of direct settling to the marsh surface by the influence of the marsh canopy.

Inundation and sediment deposition on the marsh surface is also assisted by tidal creeks which are a common feature of salt marshes. Their typically dendritic and meandering forms provide avenues for the tide to rise and flood the marsh surface, as well as to drain water, and they may facilitate higher amounts of sediment deposition than salt marsh bordering open ocean. Sediment deposition is correlated with sediment size: coarser sediments will deposit at higher elevations (closer to the creek) than finer sediments (further from the creek). Sediment size is also often correlated with particular trace metals, and thus tidal creeks can affect metal distributions and concentrations in salt marshes, in turn affecting the biota. Salt marshes do not however require tidal creeks to facilitate sediment flux over their surface although salt marshes with this morphology seem to be rarely studied.

The elevation of marsh species is important; those species at lower elevations experience longer and more frequent tidal floods and therefore have the opportunity for more sediment deposition to occur. Species at higher elevations can benefit from a greater chance of inundation at the highest tides when increased water depths and marsh surface flows can penetrate into the marsh interior.

== Human impacts ==
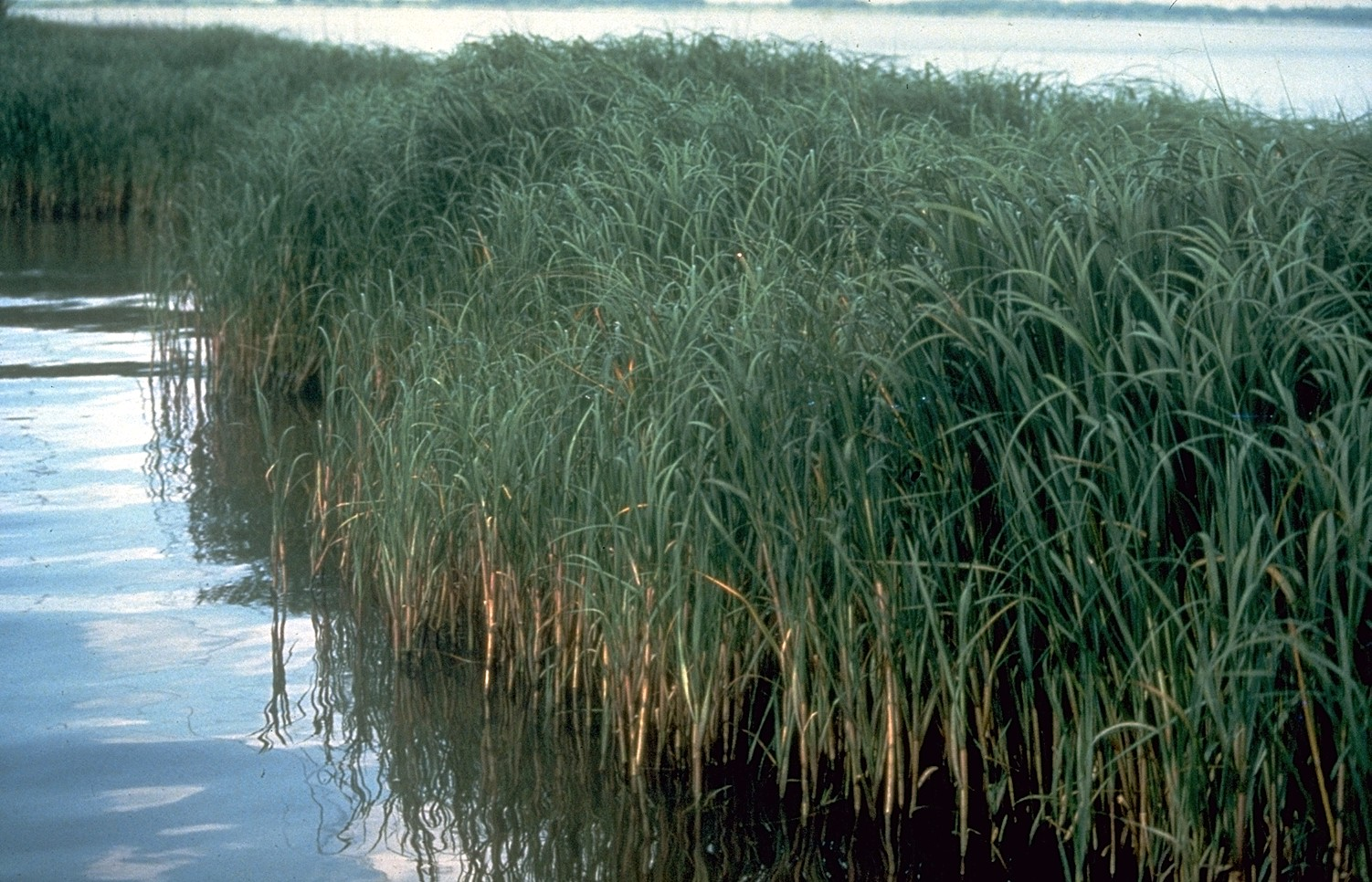
Spartina alterniflora (saltmarsh cordgrass). Native to the eastern seaboard of the United States. Considered a noxious weed in the Pacific Northwest

The coast is a highly attractive natural feature to humans through its beauty, resources, and accessibility. As of 2002, over half of the world's population was estimated to being living within 60 km of the coastal shoreline, making coastlines highly vulnerable to human impacts from daily activities that put pressure on these surrounding natural environments. In the past, salt marshes were perceived as coastal 'wastelands,' causing considerable loss and change of these ecosystems through land reclamation for agriculture, urban development, salt production and recreation. The indirect effects of human activities such as nitrogen loading also play a major role in the salt marsh area. Salt marshes can suffer from dieback in the high marsh and die-off in the low marsh. A study published in 2022 estimates that 22% of saltmarsh loss from 1999 to 2019 was due to direct human drivers, defined as observable activities occurring at the location of the detected change, such as conversion to aquaculture, agriculture, coastal development, or other physical structures. Additionally, 30% of saltmarsh gain over this same time period were also due to direct drivers, such as restoration activities or coastal modifications to promote tidal exchange.

=== Land reclamation ===
Reclamation of land for agriculture by converting marshland to upland was historically a common practice. Dikes were often built to allow for this shift in land change and to provide flood protection further inland. In recent times intertidal flats have also been reclaimed. For centuries, livestock such as sheep and cattle grazed on the highly fertile salt marsh land. Land reclamation for agriculture has resulted in many changes such as shifts in vegetation structure, sedimentation, salinity, water flow, biodiversity loss and high nutrient inputs. There have been many attempts made to eradicate these problems for example, in New Zealand, the cordgrass Spartina anglica was introduced from England into the Manawatū River mouth in 1913 to try and reclaim the estuary land for farming. A shift in structure from bare tidal flat to pastureland resulted from increased sedimentation and the cordgrass extended out into other estuaries around New Zealand. Native plants and animals struggled to survive as non-natives out competed them. Efforts are now being made to remove these cordgrass species, as the damages are slowly being recognized.

In the Blyth estuary in Suffolk in eastern England, the mid-estuary reclamations (Angel and Bulcamp marshes) that were abandoned in the 1940s have been replaced by tidal flats with compacted soils from agricultural use overlain with a thin veneer of mud. Little vegetation colonisation has occurred in the last 60–75 years and has been attributed to a combination of surface elevations too low for pioneer species to develop, and poor drainage from the compacted agricultural soils acting as an aquiclude. Terrestrial soils of this nature need to adjust from fresh to saline interstitial water by a change in the chemistry and the structure of the soil, accompanied with fresh deposition of estuarine sediment, before salt marsh vegetation can establish. The vegetation structure, species richness, and plant community composition of salt marshes naturally regenerated on reclaimed agricultural land can be compared to adjacent reference salt marshes to assess the success of marsh regeneration.

=== Upstream agriculture ===
Cultivation of land upstream from the salt marsh can introduce increased silt inputs and raise the rate of primary sediment accretion on the tidal flats, so that pioneer species can spread further onto the flats and grow rapidly upwards out of the level of tidal inundation. As a result, marsh surfaces in this regime may have an extensive cliff at their seaward edge. At the Plum Island estuary, Massachusetts (U.S.), stratigraphic cores revealed that during the 18th and 19th century the marsh prograded over subtidal and mudflat environments to increase in area from 6 km^{2} to 9 km^{2} after European settlers deforested the land upstream and increased the rate of sediment supply.

=== Urban development and nitrogen loading ===
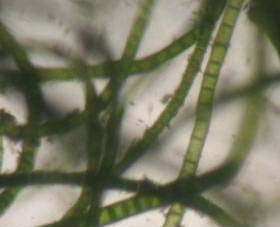
Chaetomorpha linum is a common marine algae found in the salt marsh.

The conversion of marshland to upland for agriculture has in the past century been overshadowed by conversion for urban development. Coastal cities worldwide have encroached onto former salt marshes and in the U.S. the growth of cities looked to salt marshes for waste disposal sites. Estuarine pollution from organic, inorganic, and toxic substances from urban development or industrialisation is a worldwide problem and the sediment in salt marshes may entrain this pollution with toxic effects on floral and faunal species. Urban development of salt marshes has slowed since about 1970 owing to growing awareness by environmental groups that they provide beneficial ecosystem services. They are highly productive ecosystems, and when net productivity is measured in g m^{−2} yr^{−1} they are equalled only by tropical rainforests. Additionally, they can help reduce wave erosion on sea walls designed to protect low-lying areas of land from wave erosion.

De-naturalisation of the landward boundaries of salt marshes from urban or industrial encroachment can have negative effects. In the Avon-Heathcote estuary/Ihutai, New Zealand, species abundance and the physical properties of the surrounding margins were strongly linked, and the majority of salt marsh was found to be living along areas with natural margins in the Avon / Ōtākaro and Ōpāwaho / Heathcote river outlets; conversely, artificial margins contained little marsh vegetation and restricted landward retreat. The remaining marshes surrounding these urban areas are also under immense pressure from the human population as human-induced nitrogen enrichment enters these habitats. Nitrogen loading through human-use indirectly affects salt marshes causing shifts in vegetation structure and the invasion of non-native species.

Human impacts such as sewage, urban run-off, agricultural and industrial wastes are running into the marshes from nearby sources. Salt marshes are nitrogen limited and with an increasing level of nutrients entering the system from anthropogenic effects, the plant species associated with salt marshes are being restructured through change in competition. For example, the New England salt marsh is experiencing a shift in vegetation structure where S. alterniflora is spreading from the lower marsh where it predominately resides up into the upper marsh zone. Additionally, in the same marshes, the reed Phragmites australis has been invading the area expanding to lower marshes and becoming a dominant species. P. australis is an aggressive halophyte that can invade disturbed areas in large numbers outcompeting native plants. This loss in biodiversity is not only seen in flora assemblages but also in many animals such as insects and birds as their habitat and food resources are altered.

=== Sea level rise ===
Due to the melting of Arctic sea ice and thermal expansion of the oceans, as a result of global warming, sea levels have begun to rise. As with all coastlines, this rise in water levels is predicted to negatively affect salt marshes, by flooding and eroding them. The sea level rise causes more open water zones within the salt marsh. These zones cause erosion along their edges, further eroding the marsh into open water until the whole marsh disintegrates.

While salt marshes are susceptible to threats concerning sea level rise, they are also an extremely dynamic coastal ecosystem. Salt marshes may in fact have the capability to keep pace with a rising sea level, by 2100, mean sea level could see increases between 0.6m to 1.1m. Marshes are susceptible to both erosion and accretion, which play a role in a what is called a bio-geomorphic feedback. Salt marsh vegetation captures sediment to stay in the system which in turn allows for the plants to grow better and thus the plants are better at trapping sediment and accumulate more organic matter. This positive feedback loop potentially allows for salt marsh bed level rates to keep pace with rising sea level rates. However, this feedback is also dependent on other factors like productivity of the vegetation, sediment supply, land subsidence, biomass accumulation, and magnitude and frequency of storms. In a study published by Ü. S. N. Best in 2018, they found that bioaccumulation was the number one factor in a salt marsh's ability to keep up with SLR rates. The salt marsh's resilience depends upon its increase in bed level rate being greater than that of sea levels' increasing rate, otherwise the marsh will be overtaken and drowned.

Biomass accumulation can be measured in the form of above-ground organic biomass accumulation, and below-ground inorganic accumulation by means of sediment trapping and sediment settling from suspension. Salt marsh vegetation helps to increase sediment settling because it slows current velocities, disrupts turbulent eddies, and helps to dissipate wave energy. Marsh plant species are known for their tolerance to increased salt exposure due to the common inundation of marshlands. These types of plants are called halophytes. Halophytes are a crucial part of salt marsh biodiversity and their potential to adjust to elevated sea levels. With elevated sea levels, salt marsh vegetation would likely be more exposed to more frequent inundation rates and it must be adaptable or tolerant to the consequential increased salinity levels and anaerobic conditions. There is a common elevation (above the sea level) limit for these plants to survive, where anywhere below the optimal line would lead to anoxic soils due to constant submergence and too high above this line would mean harmful soil salinity levels due to the high rate of evapotranspiration as a result of decreased submergence. Along with the vertical accretion of sediment and biomass, the accommodation space for marsh land growth must also be considered. Accommodation space is the land available for additional sediments to accumulate and marsh vegetation to colonize laterally. This lateral accommodation space is often limited by anthropogenic structures such as coastal roads, sea walls and other forms of development of coastal lands. A study by Lisa M. Schile, published in 2014, found that across a range of sea level rise rates, marshlands with high plant productivity were resistant against sea level rises but all reached a pinnacle point where accommodation space was necessary for continued survival. The presence of accommodation space allows for new mid/high habitats to form, and for marshes to escape complete inundation.

=== Mosquito control ===
Earlier in the 20th century, it was believed that draining salt marshes would help reduce mosquito populations, such as Aedes taeniorhynchus, the black salt marsh mosquito. In many locations, particularly in the northeastern United States, residents and local and state agencies dug straight-lined ditches deep into the marsh flats. The result, however, was a depletion of killifish habitat. The killifish is a mosquito predator, so the loss of habitat actually led to higher mosquito populations, and adversely affected wading birds that preyed on the killifish. These ditches can still be seen, despite some efforts to refill the ditches.

== Crab herbivory and bioturbation ==
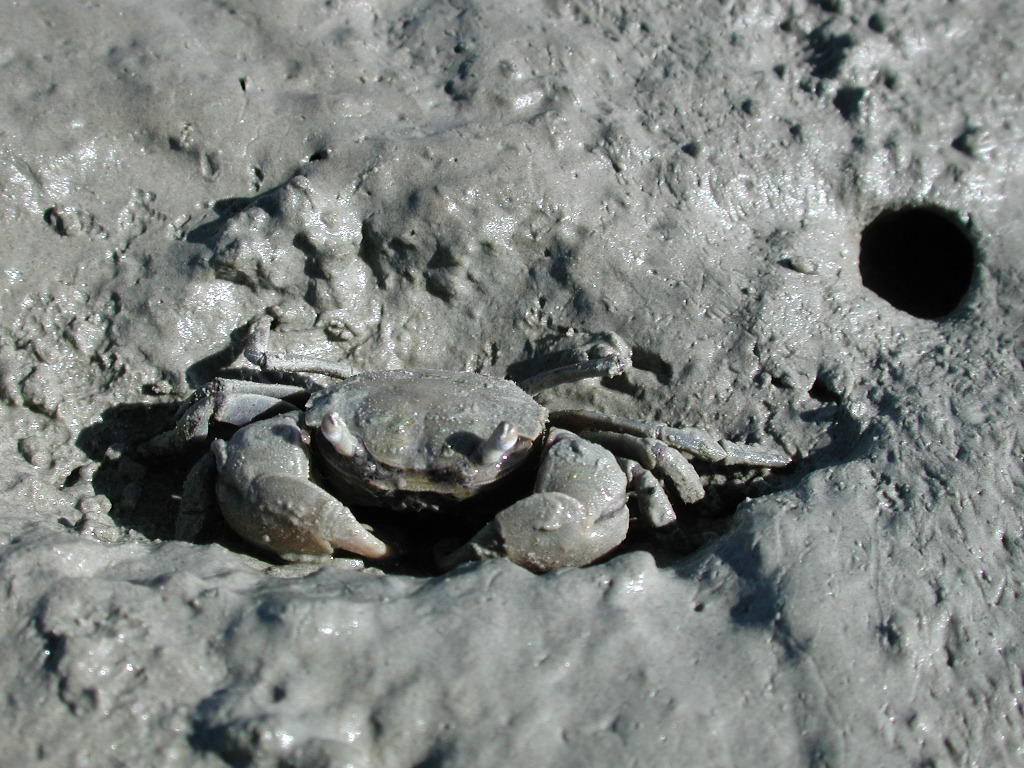
Crabs, such as the tunnelling mud crab Helice crassa of New Zealand shown here, fill a special niche in salt marsh ecosystems.

Increased nitrogen uptake by marsh species into their leaves can prompt greater rates of length-specific leaf growth, and increase the herbivory rates of crabs. The burrowing crab Neohelice granulata frequents SW Atlantic salt marshes where high density populations can be found among populations of the marsh species Spartina densiflora and Sarcocornia perennis. In Mar Chiquita lagoon, north of Mar del Plata, Argentina, Neohelice granulata herbivory increased as a likely response to the increased nutrient value of the leaves of fertilised Spartina densiflora plots, compared to non-fertilised plots. Regardless of whether the plots were fertilised or not, grazing by Neohelice granulata also reduced the length specific leaf growth rates of the leaves in summer, while increasing their length-specific senescence rates. This may have been assisted by the increased fungal effectiveness on the wounds left by the crabs.

The salt marshes of Cape Cod, Massachusetts (US), are experiencing creek bank die-offs of Spartina spp. (cordgrass) that has been attributed to herbivory by the crab Sesarma reticulatum. At 12 surveyed Cape Cod salt marsh sites, 10% – 90% of creek banks experienced die-off of cordgrass in association with a highly denuded substrate and high density of crab burrows. Populations of Sesarma reticulatum are increasing, possibly as a result of the degradation of the coastal food web in the region. The bare areas left by the intense grazing of cordgrass by Sesarma reticulatum at Cape Cod are suitable for occupation by another burrowing crab, Uca pugnax, which are not known to consume live macrophytes. The intense bioturbation of salt marsh sediments from this crab's burrowing activity has been shown to dramatically reduce the success of Spartina alterniflora and Suaeda maritima seed germination and established seedling survival, either by burial or exposure of seeds, or uprooting or burial of established seedlings. However, bioturbation by crabs may also have a positive effect. In New Zealand, the tunnelling mud crab Helice crassa has been given the stately name of an 'ecosystem engineer' for its ability to construct new habitats and alter the access of nutrients to other species. Their burrows provide an avenue for the transport of dissolved oxygen in the burrow water through the oxic sediment of the burrow walls and into the surrounding anoxic sediment, which creates the perfect habitat for special nitrogen cycling bacteria. These nitrate reducing (denitrifying) bacteria quickly consume the dissolved oxygen entering into the burrow walls to create the oxic mud layer that is thinner than that at the mud surface. This allows a more direct diffusion path for the export of nitrogen (in the form of gaseous nitrogen (N_{2})) into the flushing tidal water.

== Microbial life in salt marshes ==
The variable salinity, climate, nutrient levels and anaerobic conditions of salt marshes provide strong selective pressures on the microorganisms inhabiting them. In salt marshes, microbes play the main role in nutrient cycling and biogeochemical processing. To date, the microbial community of salt marshes has not been found to change drastically due to human impacts, but the research is still ongoing. Because of the major role of microbes in these environments, it is critical to understand the different processes performed and different microbial players present in salt marshes. Salt marshes provide habitat for chemo(litho)autotrophs, heterotrophs, and photoautotrophs alike. These organisms contribute diverse environmental services such as sulfate reduction, nitrification, decomposition and rhizosphere interactions.

=== Chemo(litho)autotrophs in salt marshes ===
Chemoautotrophs, also known as chemolithoautotrophs, are organisms capable of creating their own energy, from the use of inorganic molecules, and are able to thrive in harsh environments, such as deep sea vents or salt marshes, because they do not depend upon external organic carbon sources for their growth and survival. Some Chemoautotrophic bacterial microorganisms found in salt marshes include Betaproteobacteria and Gammaproteobacteria, both classes including sulfate-reducing bacteria (SRB), sulfur-oxidizing bacteria (SOB), and ammonia-oxidizing bacteria (AOB) which play crucial roles in nutrient cycling and ecosystem functioning.

==== Abundance and diversity of sulfate-reducing chemolithoautotrophs ====
Bacterial chemolithoautotrophs in salt marshes include sulfate-reducing bacteria. In these ecosystems, up to 50% of sedimentary remineralization can be attributed to sulfate reduction. The dominant class of sulfate-reducing bacteria in salt marshes tends to be Deltaproteobacteria. Some examples of deltaproteobacteria that are found in salt marshes are species of genera Desulfobulbus, Desulfuromonas, and Desulfovibrio.

The abundance and diversity of chemolithoautotrophs in salt marshes is largely determined by the composition of plant species in the salt marsh ecosystem. Each type of salt-marsh plant has varying lengths of growing seasons, varying photosynthetic rates, and they all lose varying amounts of organic matter to the ocean, resulting in varying carbon-inputs to the ecosystem. The results from an experiment that was done in a salt marsh in the Yangtze estuary in China, suggested that both the species richness and total abundance of sulfate-reducing bacterial communities increased when a new plant, S. alterniflora, with a higher C-input to the ecosystem was introduced. Although chemolithotrophs produce their own carbon, they still depend on the C-input from salt marshes because of the indirect impact it has on the amount of viable electron donors, such as reduced sulfur compounds. The concentration of reduced sulfur compounds, as well as other possible electron donors, increases with more organic-matter decomposition (by other organisms). Therefore, if the ecosystem contains more decomposing organic matter, as with plants with high photosynthetic and littering rates, there will be more electron donors available to the bacteria, and thus more sulfate reduction is possible. As a result, the abundance of sulfate-reducing bacteria increases. The high-photosynthetic-rate, high-litter-rate salt marsh plant, S. alterniflora, was discovered to withstand high sulfur concentrations in the soil, which would normally be somewhat toxic to plants.

The abundance of chemolithoautotrophs in salt marshes also varies temporally as a result of being somewhat dependent on the organic C-input from plants in the ecosystem. Since plants grow most throughout the summer, and usually begin to lose biomass around fall during their late stage, the highest input of decomposing organic matter is in the fall. Thus seasonally, the abundance of chemolithotrophs in salt marshes is highest in autumn.

==== Why are sulfate-reducing bacteria in salt marshes? ====
Salt marshes are the ideal environment for sulfate-reducing bacteria. The sulfate-reducing bacteria tend to live in anoxic conditions, such as in salt marshes, because they require reduced compounds to produce their energy. Since there is a high sedimentation rate and a high amount of organic matter, the conditions of the sediment are usually dependably anoxic. However, the conditions all across the salt marsh (above the sediment) are not completely anoxic, which means the organisms living here must have some level of tolerance to oxygen. Many of the chemolithoautotrophs living outside or at the surface of the sediment also exhibit this characteristic.

==== Significance of sulfate-reducing bacteria ====
Sulfate-reducing bacteria play a significant role in nutrient recycling and in reducing nitrate pollution levels. Since humans have been adding disproportionate amounts of nitrates to coastal waters, salt marshes are one of the ecosystems where nitrate pollution remains an issue. The enrichment of nitrates in the water increases denitrification, as well as microbial decomposition and primary productivity. Sulfate-reducing and oxidizing bacteria, however, play a role in removing the excess nitrates from the water to prevent eutrophication. Since the sulfate-reducing bacteria is in the water and sediment, reduced sulfur molecules are usually in abundance. These reduced sulfates then react with excess nitrate in the water, reducing nitrate and oxidizing the reduced sulfur. As a result of human nitrate enrichment, it is predicted that sulfur-oxidizing bacteria which also reduce nitrates will increase in relative abundance to sulfur-reducing bacteria.

==== Abundance and significance of chemolithoautotroph nitrifiers within salt marshes ====
Within salt marshes, chemolithoautotrophic nitrifying bacteria are also frequently identified, including Betaproteobacteria ammonia oxidizers such as Nitrosomonas and Nitrosospira. Although ammonia-oxidizing Archaea (AOA) are found to be more prevalent than ammonium-oxidizing Bacteria (AOB) within salt marsh environments, predominantly from the Crenarchaeota group, AOB play a critical role within the salt marsh environment too. Increases in marsh salinity tend to favor AOB, while higher oxygen levels and lower carbon-to-nitrogen ratios favor AOA. These AOB are important in catalyzing the rate-limiting step within the nitrification process, by using ammonium monooxygenase (AMO), produced from amoA, to convert ammonium (NH_{4}^{+}) into nitrite (NO_{2}^{−}). Specifically, within the class of Betaproteobacteria, Nitrosomonas aestuarii, Nitrosomonas marina, and Nitrosospira ureae are highly prevalent within the salt marsh environment; similarly, within the class of Gammaproteobacteria, Nitrosococcus spp. are key AOB in the marshes.

The abundance of these chemolithoautotrophs varies along the salinity gradients present within salt marshes: Nitrosomonas are more prevalent within lower salinity or freshwater regions, while Nitrosospira are found to dominate in higher saline environments. In addition, the abundance of fixed-nitrogen in these environments critically influences the distribution of the betaproteobacteria within the salt marsh: Nitrosomonas are more found to be in greater abundance within high N and C environments, whereas Nitrosospira are found to be more abundant in lower N and C regions. Further, factors such as temperature, pH, net primary productivity, and regions of anoxia may limit nitrification, and thus critically influence nitrifier distribution.

The role of nitrification by AOB in salt marshes critically links ammonia, produced from the mineralization of organic nitrogen compounds, to the process of nitrogen oxidation. Further, nitrogen oxidation is important for the downstream removal of nitrates into nitrogen gas, catalyzed by denitrifiers, from the marsh environment. Hence, AOB play an indirect role in nitrogen removal into the atmosphere.

=== Photoautotrophic bacteria ===
The bacterial photoautotroph community of salt marshes primarily consists of cyanobacteria, purple bacteria, and green sulfur bacteria.

==== Cyanobacteria in salt marshes ====
Cyanobacteria are important nitrogen fixers in salt marshes, and provide nitrogen to organisms like diatoms and microalgae.

==== Purple bacteria ====
Oxygen inhibits photosynthesis in purple bacteria, which makes estuaries a favorable habitat for them due to the low oxygen content and high levels of light present, optimizing their photosynthesis. In anoxic environments, like salt marshes, many microbes have to use sulfate as an electron acceptor during cellular respiration instead of oxygen, producing lots of hydrogen sulfide as a byproduct. While hydrogen sulfide is toxic to most organisms, purple bacteria require it to grow and will metabolize it to either sulfate or sulfur, and by doing so allowing other organisms to inhabit the toxic environment. Purple bacteria can be further classified as either purple sulphur bacteria, or purple non-sulfur bacteria. Purple sulphur bacteria are more tolerant to sulfide and store the sulfur they create intracellularly, while purple non-sulfur bacteria excrete any sulfur they produce.

==== Green bacteria ====
Green sulfur bacteria (Chlorobiaceae) are photoautotrophic bacteria that utilize sulfide and thiosulfate for their growth, producing sulfate in the process. They are very adapted to photosynthesizing in low light environments with bacteriochlorophyll pigments a, c, d, and e, to help them absorb wavelengths of light that other organisms cannot. When co-existing with purple bacteria, they often occupy lower depths as they are less tolerant to oxygen, but more photosynthetically adept.

=== Rhizosphere microbes ===
==== Fungi ====
Some mycorrhizal fungi, like arbuscular mycorrhiza are widely associated with salt marsh plants and may even help plants grow in salt marsh soil rich in heavy metals by reducing their uptake into the plant, although the exact mechanism has yet to be determined.

==== Bacteria ====
Examining 16S ribosomal DNA found in Yangtze River Estuary, the most common bacteria in the rhizosphere were Proteobacteria such as Betaproteobacteria, Gammaproteobacteria, Deltaproteobacteria, and Epsilonproteobacteria. One such widespread species had a similar ribotype to the animal pathogen S. marcescens, and may be beneficial for plants as the bacteria can break down chitin into available carbon and nitrogen for plants to use. Actinobacteria have also been found in plant rhizosphere in costal salt marshes and help plants grow through helping plants absorb more nutrients and secreting antimicrobial compounds. In Jiangsu, China, Actinobacteria from the suborders Pseudonocardineae, Corynebacterineae, Propionibacterineae, Streptomycineae, Micromonosporineae, Streptosporangineae and Micrococcineae were cultured and isolated from rhizosphere soil.

=== Microbial decomposition activity within salt marshes ===
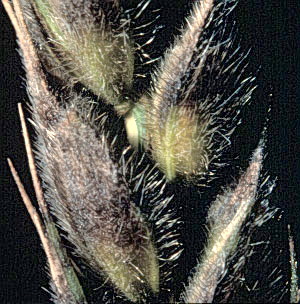
Phaeosphaeria sp. on wheat. This fungus is of the same genus common to salt marsh cordgrass.

Another key process among microbial salt marshes is microbial decomposition activity. Nutrient cycling in salt marshes is highly promoted by the resident community of bacteria and fungi involved in remineralizing organic matter. Studies on the decomposition of a salt marsh cordgrass, Spartina alterniflora, have shown that fungal colonization begins the degradation process, which is then finished by the bacterial community. The carbon from Spartina alterniflora is made accessible to the salt marsh food web largely through these bacterial communities which are then consumed by bacterivores. Bacteria are responsible for the degradation of up to 88% of lignocellulotic material in salt marshes. However, fungal populations have been found to dominate over bacterial populations in winter months.

The fungi that make up the decomposition community in salt marshes come from the phylum ascomycota, the two most prevalent species being Phaeosphaeria spartinicola and Mycosphaerella sp. strain 2. In terms of bacteria, the alphaproteobacteria class is the most prevalent class within the salt marsh environment involved in decomposition activity. The propagation of Phaeosphaeria spartinicola is through ascospores that are released when the host plant is wetted by high tides or rain.

== Restoration and management ==
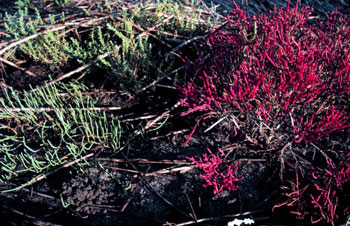
Glasswort (Salicornia spp.) species endemic to the high marsh zone

The perception of bay salt marshes as a coastal 'wasteland' has since changed, acknowledging that they are one of the most biologically productive habitats on earth, rivalling tropical rainforests. Salt marshes are ecologically important, providing habitats for native migratory fish and acting as sheltered feeding and nursery grounds. They are now protected by legislation in many countries to prevent the loss of these ecologically important habitats. In the United States and Europe, they are now accorded a high level of protection by the Clean Water Act and the Habitats Directive respectively. With the impacts of this habitats and their importance now realised, a growing interest in restoring salt marshes through managed retreat or the reclamation of land has been established. However, many Asian countries such as China still need to recognise the value of marshlands. With their ever-growing populations and intense development along the coast, the value of salt marshes tends to be ignored and the land continues to be reclaimed.

Bakker et al. (1997) suggests two options available for restoring salt marshes. The first is to abandon all human interference and leave the salt marsh to complete its natural development. These types of restoration projects are often unsuccessful as vegetation tends to struggle to revert to its original structure and the natural tidal cycles are shifted due to land changes. The second option suggested by Bakker et al. (1997) is to restore the destroyed habitat into its natural state either at the original site or as a replacement at a different site. Under natural conditions, recovery can take 2–10 years or even longer depending on the nature and degree of the disturbance and the relative maturity of the marsh involved. Marshes in their pioneer stages of development will recover more rapidly than mature marshes as they are often first to colonize the land. Restoration can often be sped up through the replanting of native vegetation.

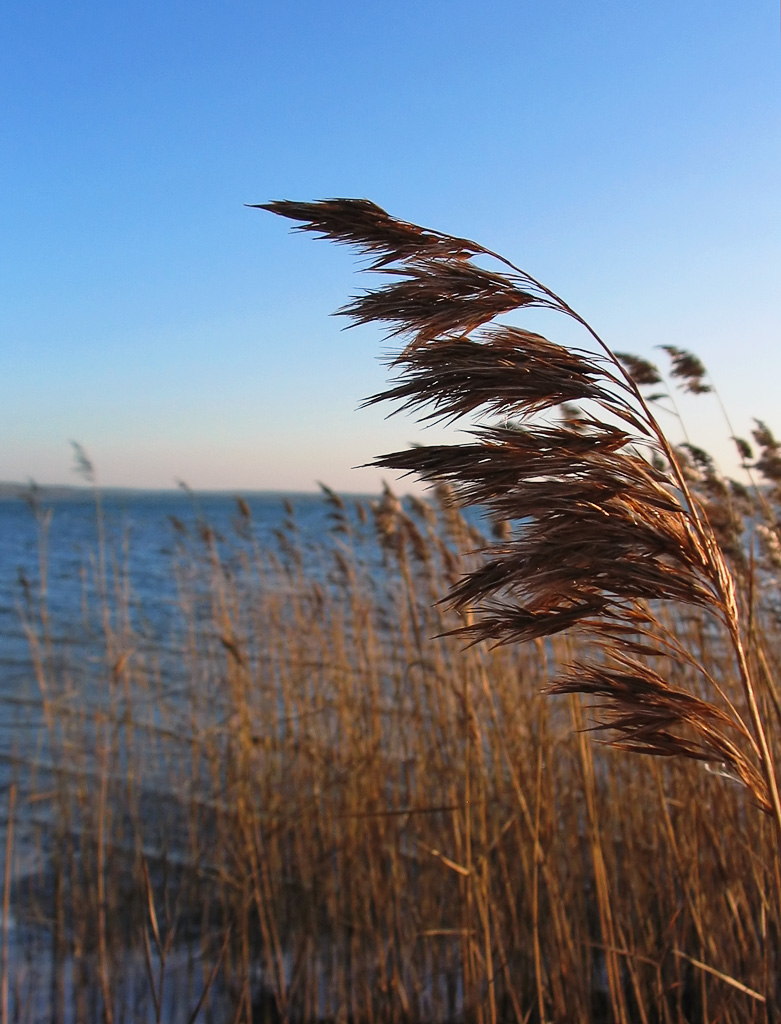
Common reed (Phragmites australis) an invasive species in degraded marshes in the northeastern United States

This last approach is often the most practiced and generally more successful than allowing the area to naturally recover on its own. The salt marshes in the state of Connecticut in the United States have long been an area lost to fill and dredging. As of 1969, the Tidal Wetland Act was introduced that ceased this practice, but despite the introduction of the act, the system was still degrading due to alterations in tidal flow. One area in Connecticut is the marshes on Barn Island. These marshes were diked then impounded with salt and brackish marsh during 1946–1966. As a result, the marsh shifted to a freshwater state and became dominated by the invasive species P. australis, Typha angustifolia and T. latifolia that have little ecological connection to the area.

By 1980, a restoration programme was put in place that has now been running for over 20 years. This programme has aimed to reconnect the marshes by returning tidal flow along with the ecological functions and characteristics of the marshes back to their original state. In the case of Barn Island, reduction of the invasive species has been initiated, re-establishing the tidal-marsh vegetation along with animal species such as fish and insects. This example highlights that considerable time and effort is needed to effectively restore salt marsh systems. The timescale for salt marsh recovery is dependent on the development stage of the marsh, type and extent of the disturbance, geographical location and the environmental and physiological stress factors to the marsh-associated flora and fauna.

Although much effort has gone into restoring salt marshes worldwide, further research is needed. There are many setbacks and problems associated with marsh restoration that require careful long-term monitoring. Information on all components of the salt marsh ecosystem should be understood and monitored from sedimentation, nutrient, and tidal influences, to behaviour patterns and tolerances of both flora and fauna species. Once a better understanding of these processes is acquired, and not just locally, but over a global scale, then more sound and practical management and restoration efforts can be implemented to preserve these valuable marshes and restore them to their original state.

Dredging, pipelines for offshore petroleum resources, highway construction, accidental toxic spills, and attempts to turn salt marshes into farm land are all examples of human-induced disturbances. Despite the number of restoration efforts we plan to implement and protected marshes, it seems like human settlement will for some time now and into the future be the major factor in salt marsh degradation.

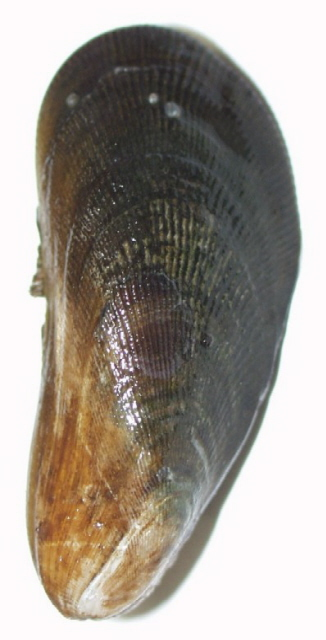
Atlantic ribbed mussel, found in the low marsh

In addition to restoring and managing salt marsh systems based on scientific principles, the opportunity should be taken to educate public audiences of their importance biologically and their purpose as serving as a natural buffer for flood protection. Because salt marshes are often located next to urban areas, they are likely to receive more visitors than remote wetlands. By physically seeing the marsh, people are more likely to take notice and be more aware of the environment around them. An example of public involvement occurred at the Famosa Slough State Marine Conservation Area in San Diego, where a "friends" group worked for over a decade in trying to prevent the area from being developed. Eventually, the 5-hectare (12-acre) site was bought by the city and the group worked together to restore the area. The project involved removing of invasive species and replanting with native ones, along with public talks to other locals, frequent bird walks and clean-up events.

== Research methods ==
There is a diverse range and combination of methodologies employed to understand the hydrological dynamics in salt marshes and their ability to trap and accrete sediment. Sediment traps are often used to measure rates of marsh surface accretion when short term deployments (e.g. less than one month) are required. These circular traps consist of pre-weighed filters that are anchored to the marsh surface, then dried in a laboratory and re-weighed to determine the total deposited sediment.

For longer-term studies (e.g. more than one year) researchers may prefer to measure sediment accretion with marker horizon plots. Marker horizons consist of a mineral such as feldspar that is buried at a known depth within wetland substrates to record the increase in overlying substrate over long time periods. In order to gauge the amount of sediment suspended in the water column, manual or automated samples of tidal water can be poured through pre-weighed filters in a laboratory then dried to determine the amount of sediment per volume of water.

Another method for estimating suspended sediment concentrations is by measuring the turbidity of the water using optical backscatter probes, which can be calibrated against water samples containing a known suspended sediment concentration to establish a regression relationship between the two. Marsh surface elevations may be measured with a stadia rod and transit, electronic theodolite, Real-Time Kinematic Global Positioning System, laser level or electronic distance meter (total station). Hydrological dynamics include water depth, measured automatically with a pressure transducer, or with a marked wooden stake, and water velocity, often using electromagnetic current meters.

== See also ==
- Bayou
- Beach meadow
- Biodiversity action plan
- Blue carbon
- Body of water
- Bog
- Brackish marsh
- California coastal salt marsh
- Fen
- Great Marsh
- Halligen (salt meadow islands)
- Halophyte
- High marsh
- Lagoon
- Low marsh
- Mangrove swamp
- Marine coastal ecosystem
- Marsh
- Mesopotamian Marshes
- Mudflat
- Ocean Data Viewer: contains worldwide salt marshes dataset
- Outwelling
- Plant community
- Salt lake
- Salt pan (geology)
- Salt marsh die-off
- Seagrass
- Saltwater swamp
- Tidal marsh
- Freshwater marsh
- Wetland
