= High marsh =

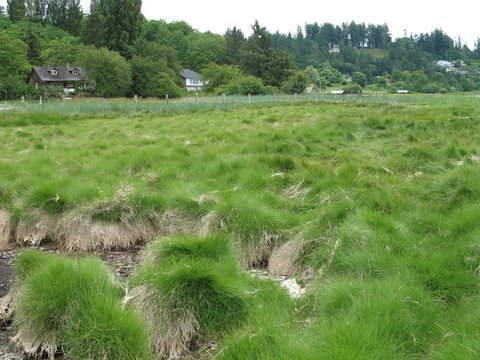
Spartina patens in a high marsh with uplands visible in the background

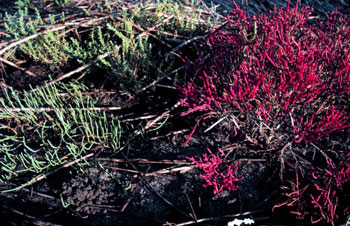
Glasswort (salicornia spp.) a species endemic to the high marsh zone.

Elements of a tidal marsh and how they relate to the tides. Open with the play button, then scroll to change the tide.

High marsh is a tidal marsh zone located above the Mean Highwater Mark (MHW) which, in contrast to the low marsh zone, is inundated infrequently during periods of extreme high tide and storm surge associated with coastal storms. This zone is impacted by spring tides, which is a bi-monthly lunar occurrence where the high marsh experiences higher inundation levels. The high marsh is the intermittent zone between the low marsh and the uplands, an entirely terrestrial area rarely flooded during events of extreme tidal action caused by severe coastal storms. The high marsh is distinguished from the low marsh by its sandy soil and higher elevation. The elevation of the high marsh allows this zone to be covered by the high tide for no more than an hour a day. With the soil exposed to air for long periods of time, evaporation occurs, leading to high salinity levels, up to four times that of sea water. Areas of extremely high salinity prohibit plant growth altogether. These barren sandy areas are known as "salt pans". Some cordgrass plants do survive here, but are stunted and do not reach their full size.

The high marsh depends on regular tidal activity and inundation to deposit sediments. Sediment deposition facilitates mineral and organic matter buildup and sediment accretion. The minerals and organic matter promote vegetation growth and the sediment accretion promotes heightened elevation growth.

The high marsh is also important to many habitat specialists such as the Saltmarsh Sparrow, Black Rail, American Black Duck, saltmarsh spike-grass, and salt-hay. These specialists rely on the high marsh ecosystem to provide for their biological needs to ensure stable productivity and abundance. Among these biological needs are foraging, mating, nesting, incubation, and brooding.

The Clean Water Act of 1972 was the first act to protect these ecosystems but, due to the absence of protection, many wetlands were converted into farmland and residential land.

== Marsh Prevalence Worldwide ==
Saltmarshes are found in at least 99 countries, as mapped by scientists McOwen et al. in 2017. Similarly, in 43 countries/territories there are 5,495,089 mapped hectares of saltmarsh. The coterminous United States has many estimates for original wetland content, spanning from 211 to 217 million acres total. Alaska has the highest amount of wetlands, with an estimated 165 million acres originally. The U.S. Department of Interior and the U.S. Fish and Wildlife Service estimate that colonial United States had approximately 392 million acres, with 221 million in the 48 states, 170 million acres in Alaska, and 59,000 acres in Hawaii.

Thomas Dahl reports in Wetlands that from 1780 to 1980 there was a “53-percent loss from the original [wetland] acreage total." Further, United States wetlands experienced a net loss of approximately 60,000 acres per year spanning from 1998 to 2004. This increased to 80,000 acres per year between 2004 and 2009.

== High Marsh Loss Cause ==
The high marsh is one of the most threatened features of wetlands. On average, the United States' coastal areas support high per capita communities. Due to this, these areas face the pressure of development and overdevelopment.

The United States Fish and Wildlife Service (FWS) summarizes data from the Cape Cod National Seashore (CCNS) and states that “there has been a documented shift in the high marsh to low marsh boundary by 100 m (328 ft) upslope between 1984 and 2000 in the ‘Gut’ at Wellfleet, and a loss of 46 percent of the high marsh between 1947 and 2005." This high marsh loss is evident throughout the United States.

Overall, the high marsh is particularly vulnerable to the impacts of climate change and anthropogenic actions, as follows.

=== Nutrient Overload and Contamination ===
This coastal development near marshes may increase the nitrogen and phosphorus concentration leached into waterways, particularly from sewage treatment and systems. Further, due to farmlands, lawns, and golf courses, nitrogen concentrations may also be increased. When the high marsh plants are exposed to a higher concentration of nitrogen and phosphorus, the underground biomass decreases and the aboveground increases, making the ecosystem susceptible to widening and erosion. These higher nutrient concentrations may also lead to eutrophication and fish kills.

=== Infrastructure ===
Certain tidal restricting infrastructure—such as roadways, dikes, and floodgates—disrupt the natural tidal flow. These restrictions prevent the sediment accretion and nutrient deposition that the high marsh relies on for elevation growth and vegetation health.

== See also ==
- Salt Pannes and Pools
- Low Marsh
