= Salt marsh dieback =

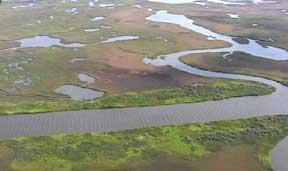
Salt marsh dieback results in the death of marsh-specific plants and the erosion of the landscape.

High salt marsh dieback, or salt marsh browning, is the primary force in salt marsh degradation in the high marsh. The general effect is that the plants in the marsh die off and brown, leaving dead organic matter, and ultimately open sediment. Without strong plant roots holding the sediment, these open areas of land erode, causing the salt marsh to retreat back to the mainland. Dieback zones lack their main producers, such as the salt marsh cord grass, or Spartina alterniflora, and ultimately become completely unproductive.

== Overview of hypotheses ==
Scientists have studied salt marsh dieback for decades, and they still argue about its causes. One of the main ideas suggests that salt marsh dieback is caused by waterlogging in S. alterniflora from increased submersion within the tides, increased sediment, and oxygen deficiency. Other scientists have researched the possibility of increased soil salinity and decreased soil water as the causes for dieback.

=== Importance of salt marshes ===
Salt marshes are important in preserving the brooding and nursery habitats of shellfish, fish, and insects.

== Waterlogging hypothesis ==
Waterlogging is the result of too much water in a plant's root system and the surrounding soil, and usually occurs in the inland areas of the marsh. With the increase of surface water, waterlogged soils contain many reduced molecules, which can induce the accumulation of sulfide and other toxic compounds. Current studies suggest that increased waterlogging is caused by sea level rise, a possible effect of global warming, which has many natural and anthropologic causes of its own.

=== Reduced aerobic respiration ===
Salt marsh dieback results in the death of marsh-specific plants and the erosion of the landscape. One of the causes of waterlogging is the reduced aerobic respiration by the roots of S. alterniflora. It occurs mainly in the inland zones, though the streamside plants show partial anaerobic respiration.

Aerobic respiration takes sugars and oxygen to create carbon dioxide, water, and energy.

As aerobic respiration decreases, the plants become oxygen deficient, since the roots are unable to produce enough oxygen in the reduced soil conditions. Decreased oxygen uptake can also decrease plant productivity.

To gain energy, these plants then go through a process of alcoholic fermentation (Mendelssohn et al. 1981). This fermentation process has an end product of carbon in the form of ethanol, which is diffused from the roots. Therefore, the plants are unable to use the diffused carbon, so the available plant energy decreases.

=== Increased soil sulfide ===
Another product of waterlogging is the increase of sulfide in soil. The increase of sulfide is caused by anaerobic and aerobic bacteria, which are mainly seen in reduced soils.

Increased sulfide has been shown to inhibit NH_{4}-N (ammoniacal nitrogen, an ammonium salt) uptake within the plant. NH_{4}-N is the most available form of nitrogen within the soil and it is a limiting nutrient in S. alterniflora productivity.

A higher concentration of NH_{4}-N in the soil may show that the plant's uptake of NH_{4}-N has decreased, leaving excess molecules in the soil. In addition, reduced soils can cause plant nitrification to decrease, leading to a greater lack of NH_{4}-N uptake.

=== Possible solutions ===
Some scientists have found solutions to this problem. Mendelssohn and Kuhn set up an experiment with plants and soils in a Louisiana salt marsh in 2003. They found that when sediment deposits are increased within an unhealthy salt marsh area, the plants and soils are in better conditions.

The experiment showed that the plants with the greater sediment levels had more plant cover, with higher plants and a greater bulk density. The surface elevation increased with the increase of sediment, therefore reducing flooding. The roots could respire aerobically, so they did not have to rely on fermentation for energy. The plants with more sediment also showed a decrease in sulfide and NH_{4}-N concentrations in the soil. Mendelssohn postulates that since the concentration of NH_{4}-N decreased after the addition of sediment, more of the nitrogen was used by the plants.

== Salinity hypothesis ==
A second hypothesis of salt marsh dieback focuses on increased salinity and lack of soil water being the main causes of salt marsh dieback. Some scientists see this hypothesis as relevant, since global warming suggests that increased global temperatures may lead to increased evaporation and transpiration.

Brown and Pezeshki devised an experiment in which many S. alterniflora individuals were put under situations of increased salinity, increased water stress, and then a combined treatment. They found that those plants that experienced the combined treatment exhibited an increase in water stress, where plants are unable to get a sufficient amount of water from the soil, a decrease in photosynthetic activity, and ultimately death (Brown & Pezeshki 2007).
