= Linda Deegan =

American ecologist

- Education: Northeastern University; University of New Hampshire; Louisiana State University
- Occupation: Ecologist
- Scientific career
- Thesis: The population ecology and nutrient transport of gulf menhaden in Fourleague Bay, Louisiana (1985)

Linda Ann Deegan is an American estuarine and arctic ecologist with expertise in freshwater inputs, food web interactions, eutrophication, estuaries, and coastal processes. Her research combines ecosystem perspectives, energy flows, and community dynamics to tackle issues such as the effects of habitat degradation on fish communities, the importance of fish in exporting nutrients and carbon in estuaries, and the response of upper trophic levels to increased nutrient trends in arctic landscapes. Deegan is the co-editor-in-chief of the journal Estuaries and Coasts.

== Education ==
Deegan earned her bachelor of science degree in biology from Northeastern University in 1976, where she worked on mummichog in the Plum Island estuary. She received her master's degree in zoology from the University of New Hampshire in 1979. She earned her Ph.D. in marine sciences from Louisiana State University in 1985. Her Ph.D. dissertation was titled "The population ecology and nutrient cycling of gulf menhaden in Fourleague Bay, Louisiana".

== Career ==
Deegan began her career in 1985 as an assistant professor at the University of Massachusetts Amherst and became an adjunct professor in 1989 in the Department of Environmental Conservation. In 1989, she joined the Ecosystem Center at the Marine Biological Laboratory in Woods Hole, Massachusetts, where she was promoted to senior scientist in 2016. Starting in 2004, she was a professor in the Department of Ecology and Evolutionary Biology and the Department of Geology at Brown University. As of 2009, Deegan has served as the director of the Comparative Analysis of Marine Ecosystem Organization (CAMEO), a joint NSF and NOAA program. In 2016, Deegan joined the Woodwell Climate Research Center.

Deegan shares the editor-in-chief position for Estuaries and Coasts with Paul Montagna.

== Research ==
Deegan is known for her work on the effects of nutrient enrichment on salt marsh ecosystems, the impact of climate change on Arctic tundra ecosystems, and the role of wetlands in regulating carbon and nitrogen cycling. Deegan's work at Toolik Lake in Alaska has examined the impact of droughts on fish, the impact of increasing water temperature on Arctic grayling fish, and thermokarst terrains, which are regions where permafrost has collapsed due to melting.

Deegan has served as project director of the TIDE project since 1996. The project is the only coastal ecosystem-scale nutrient addition experiment in the world, as it adds chemical fertilizers to regions of the marsh in order to examine the impact on the ecosystem. Deegan's work has shown that excessive nutrient levels cause changes in the fish and grasses. In 2012, Deegan led the publication in Nature documenting the changes in the estuary that resulted from the addition of nutrients.

== Selected publications ==
- Deegan, Linda A. (January 1, 1993). "Nutrient and Energy Transport between Estuaries and Coastal Marine Ecosystems by Fish Migration". Canadian Journal of Fisheries and Aquatic Sciences. 50 (1): 74–79. Bibcode:1993CJFAS..50...74D. doi:10.1139/f93-009. ISSN 0706-652X.
- Deegan, La; Garritt, Rh (1997). "Evidence for spatial variability in estuarine food webs". Marine Ecology Progress Series. 147: 31–47. Bibcode:1997MEPS..147...31D. doi:10.3354/meps147031. ISSN 0171-8630.
- Deegan, Linda A.; Finn, John T.; Ayvazian, Suzanne G.; Ryder-Kieffer, Cheryl A.; Buonaccorsi, John (1997). "Development and Validation of an Estuarine Biotic Integrity Index". Estuaries. 20 (3): 601. doi:10.2307/1352618. JSTOR 1352618.
- Deegan, Linda A.; Johnson, David Samuel; Warren, R. Scott; Peterson, Bruce J.; Fleeger, John W.; Fagherazzi, Sergio; Wollheim, Wilfred M. (2012). "Coastal eutrophication as a driver of salt marsh loss". Nature. 490 (7420): 388–392. Bibcode:2012Natur.490..388D. doi:10.1038/nature11533. ISSN 0028-0836. PMID 23075989.
