= Low marsh =

Elements of a tidal marsh and how they relate to the tides. Open with the play button, then scroll to change the tide.

Low marsh is a tidal marsh zone located below the Mean Highwater Mark (MHM). Based on elevation, frequency of submersion, soil characteristics, vegetation, microbial community, and other metrics, salt marshes can be divided to into three distinct areas: low marsh, middle marsh/high marsh, and the upland zone. Low marsh is characterized as being flooded daily with each high tide, while remaining exposed during low tides.

== Flora and fauna ==
Tall-form Spartina alterniflora (Smooth Cordgrass) is the dominant vegetative species in low marsh areas. S. alterniflora is a native marsh species that is adapted to salt marsh habitat and found along the eastern seaboard of North America, along the coast of Washington, and along the Gulf of Mexico. This tall, warm-season grass grows in frequently inundated and areas with high salinity. This species provides shelter and cover for Fiddler crabs (Uca pugnax), ribbed mussels (Geukensia demissa), waterfowl, wading birds, shorebirds, muskrats, and commercially important fish and shellfish. S. alterniflora contributes to the fight against shoreline erosion by providing soil stabilization and improves water quality by filtering toxic material, such as heavy metals, from the water column.

== Ecosystem services ==
Salt marshes are very productive ecosystems and provide many ecosystem services including carbon cycling, nitrogen cycling, and coastal flood protection.

=== Flood protection ===
Coastal infrastructure is vulnerable to flooding from sea level rise, storms, and land subsidence. Salt marshes help to mitigate effects of flooding by directly buffering coastlines and dissipating waves. They are some of the many types of natural coastal landforms that are widely recognized as barriers to waves and tidal flows. Marsh vegetation causes wave attenuation and may account for up to 60 percent of wave reduction. Marsh plants also improve soil stability, which decreases soil erosion.

=== Biogeochemical ecosystem services ===
Salt marshes and other coastal wetland ecosystems play an important role in the global biogeochemical cycle, especially in the carbon and nitrogen cycles.

==== Carbon cycle ====
Coastal wetlands, such as salt marshes, can sequester carbon at a rate up to ten times that of a mature tropical forest. Through photosynthesis, marsh vegetation capture large amounts of carbon dioxide from the atmosphere. This carbon is stored in plant tissues and soil for hundreds or thousands of years. Coastal salt marshes can sequester about 210 grams of carbon per meter squared per year, which is 2-5 times more carbon per equivalent area than tropical forests.

Eh potential, the energetic favorability of a reaction, is the lowest in low marsh. Eh potential indicates the potential for carbon loss via oxidation into the atmosphere as carbon dioxide. Therefore, the low marsh may have the lowest carbon dioxide emissions compared to other parts of the marsh platform.

==== Nitrogen cycle ====
Both nitrification and denitrification occur in salt marshes. In nitrification, ammonium is oxidized to nitrite, then nitrite is oxidized to nitrate. In denitrification, organic matter is oxidized using nitrate as a terminal electron acceptor. Denitrification is highest in the low marsh. Nitrogen recycling is the lowest in the low marsh.

== Threats to low marsh ==
=== Sea-level rise ===
Future health and persistence of coastal wetlands remains very uncertain. Coastal wetlands, such as salt marshes, with low elevation gradients are the ecosystems that will be first affected by and have to adapt to increased sea level rise(SLR). Areal loss has been predicted for salt marshes with low and/or declining sediment supply. Depending on the Intergovernmental Panel on Climate Change (IPCC) RCP scenario, 60-91 percent of salt marshes in a meta-analysis study will not be able to keep up with future rates of SLR. In this same study, 8 out of 9 marshes with the highest rates of local SLR were already not keeping pace with SLR and are experiencing an average loss of 3.9 millimeters per year.Increased thermal expansion and increased water supplied to oceans due to higher global temperatures associated with anthropogenic carbon dioxide emissions have caused the rates of SLR along the United States' Atlantic coast to range from 0.6 to 4 millimeters per year as of the year 2021. Rates of SLR are expected to only increase in the future as the magnitude of greenhouse gases in our atmosphere increases. SLR will cause low marsh to "drown" and be converted to open water.

=== Human disturbance and interference ===
Coastal development, such as roads and houses, prevents salt marshes from migrating inland away from the coast as sea level rises. In the past, salt marshes have migrated inland as a response to sea level from glaciation. Land directly above marshes is slowly converted to high marsh due to increased salt water inundation due to SLR. Upland vegetation is replaced by halophyte marsh species as a result from increased soil salinity and moisture. This occurs as low marsh closest to the tidal creek is converted to open water. The boundaries of marsh vegetation zones shift inland. This allows for the same square footage of each marsh zone to remain the same. However, when infrastructure is located directly upland to a marsh, that marsh is physically blocked from migration. The boundary between the low marsh and the high marsh continues to shift inland, but the upland region of the marsh has no land to convert to marsh area. This results in the upland and eventually high marsh zones to be lost.

In addition to coastal development blocking upland marsh migration, it also increases runoff into the marsh. Increases of impervious surfaces in coastal development nearby marshes increases the amount the rainfall runoff and surface water that may enter marshes. Runoff carries pollutants, including but not limited to fertilizers, sediment, waste, and litter, as well as freshwater into marshes. The specific ecological effects and their magnitudes vary depending on the concentrations, frequency, and chemical makeup of runoff pollutants. Furthermore, marshes may be drained, dredged, and filled to make the land available for coastal development and agriculture. Marshes are also commonly ditched and drained for mosquito and other pest control.

=== Invasive species ===
As with many different ecosystems, salt marshes are susceptible to invasions by non-native species. Phragmites australis (Common Reed), is a perennial, aggressive wetland grass that grows in dense stands over 10 feet tall and is a common invader of salt marshes. Phragmites rapidly colonizes near areas and can out compete replace native marsh vegetation. This invasive species provides little to no food or shelter to salt marsh wildlife.

Wrack, while not an invasive species in the traditional sense, also can destroy native salt marsh vegetation. Wrack is deposited material composed mostly of dead marsh vegetation. If it accumulates over vegetation for sufficient period of time, it will block sunlight and smother the plants underneath.

Sesarma reticulatum (Purple marsh crabs) are a native marsh species, although fishing and crabbing can remove their predators from the ecosystem. When purple marsh crab populations remain unchecked, they will "mow down" S. alternilfora and increase the number of burrows in the soil. Burrows decrease soil stability and make the soil more likely to erode.

== Conservation and management ==
There are many worldwide organizations like The Nature Conservancy, Environment Protection Agency, Buzzards Bay Coalition, Association to Preserve Cape Cod, and Department of Environmental Management that participate in salt marsh restoration, protection, and management.

Common restoration strategies include recovery of tidal exchange, recovery of sediment characteristics, reconstruction of soil level, conversion of dredged sediment to salt marsh, control of invasive species, and restricting boating and other water vehicles. The method(s) employed in a salt marsh depend on the specific marsh itself and local area. For example, a salt marsh in the Bay of Fundy, Canada may be restored by expanding the tidal channel through constructing a culvert, while a salt marsh in Northwest Europe may be restored by removing dikes.

In order to protect salt marshes, governments create reserves such as Shifting Lots Preserve in Plymouth, MA, Estero Marsh Preserve, and Clive Runnells Family Mad Island Marsh. These are areas where resources and land are managed and restricted.
