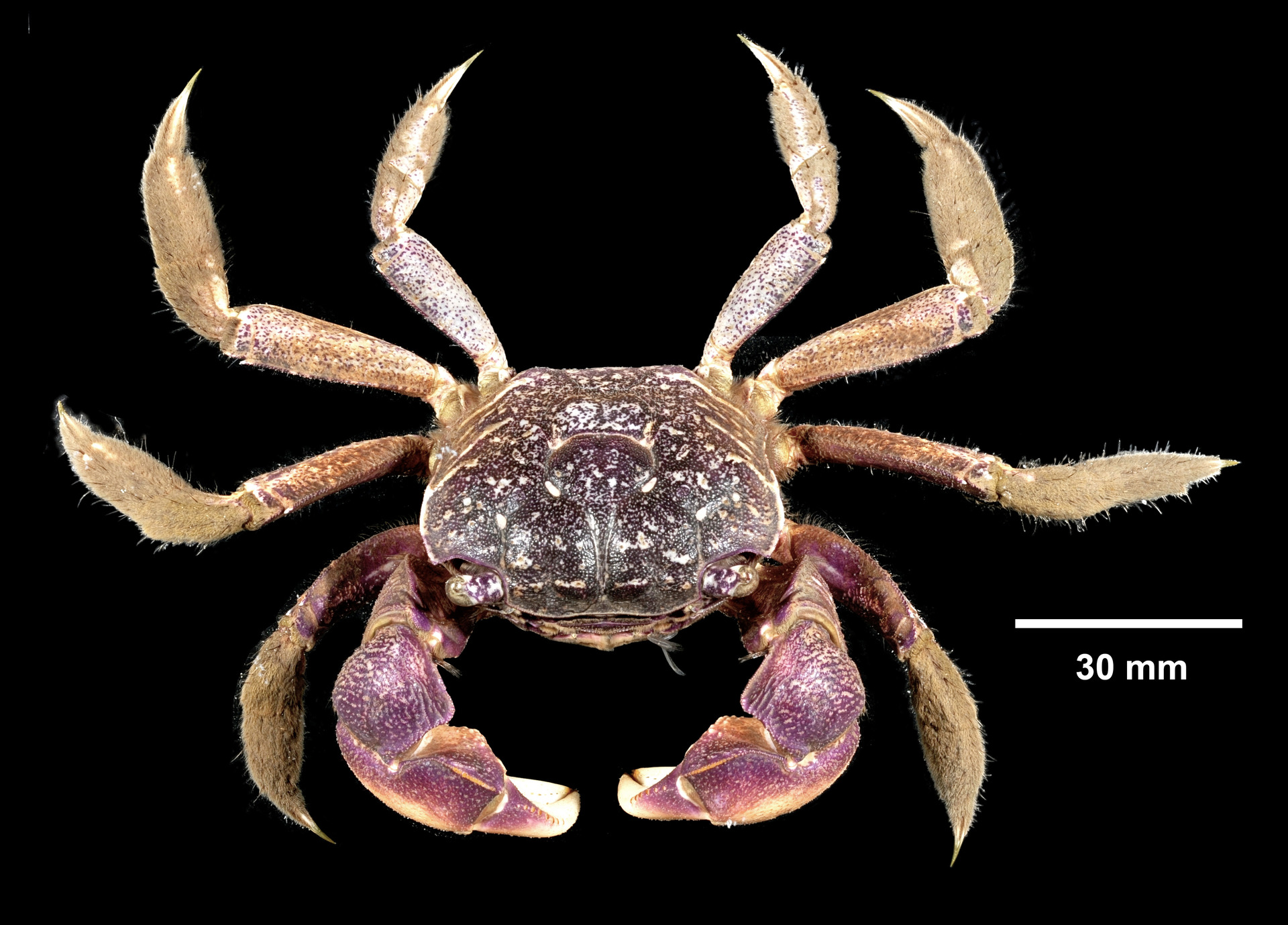

Scientific classification
- Kingdom: Animalia
- Phylum: Arthropoda
- Clade: Pancrustacea
- Class: Malacostraca
- Order: Decapoda
- Suborder: Pleocyemata
- Infraorder: Brachyura
- Family: Sesarmidae
- Genus: Sesarma
- Species: S. reticulatum

Binomial name
- Sesarma reticulatum (Say, 1817)

= Sesarma reticulatum =

Species of crab

Sesarma reticulatum, the purple marsh crab or simply marsh crab, is a crab species native to the salt marshes of the eastern United States.

== Distribution ==
The range of S. reticulatum extends from Woods Hole, Massachusetts to Volusia County, Florida; a related species occurs in the Gulf of Mexico.

== Description ==
Sesarma reticulatum is purple or brown, with darker speckles, with a carapace up to 1 inch (25 mm) long. It can be distinguished from the closely related S. cinereum by the presence of a second tooth around the orbit of each eye.

The larvae or zoea of Sesarma reticulatum are aquatic, residing at a depth of greater than 1 meter below the water's surface. The larvae remain in estuaries during their development, providing food for predators. Most Sesarma species live in mangroves.

== Ecology ==
Their overpopulation, caused by over-harvesting by recreational fishermen of its natural predators such as blue crabs, striped bass, smooth dogfish and cod, has been blamed for the decline in cordgrass found in the salt marshes of Cape Cod and the decrease in the extent of salt marshes on the Atlantic coast of North America due to increased erosion. Scientists from Brown and Princeton universities methodically ruled out other causes for the degradation of the salt marshes. The explosion in the population of sesarma crabs has provided additional food to night herons. The crabs eat marsh grass not only from above but underground in tunnels they construct. The research demonstrates the possible cumulative ecological impact of popular human activities such as recreational fishing.
