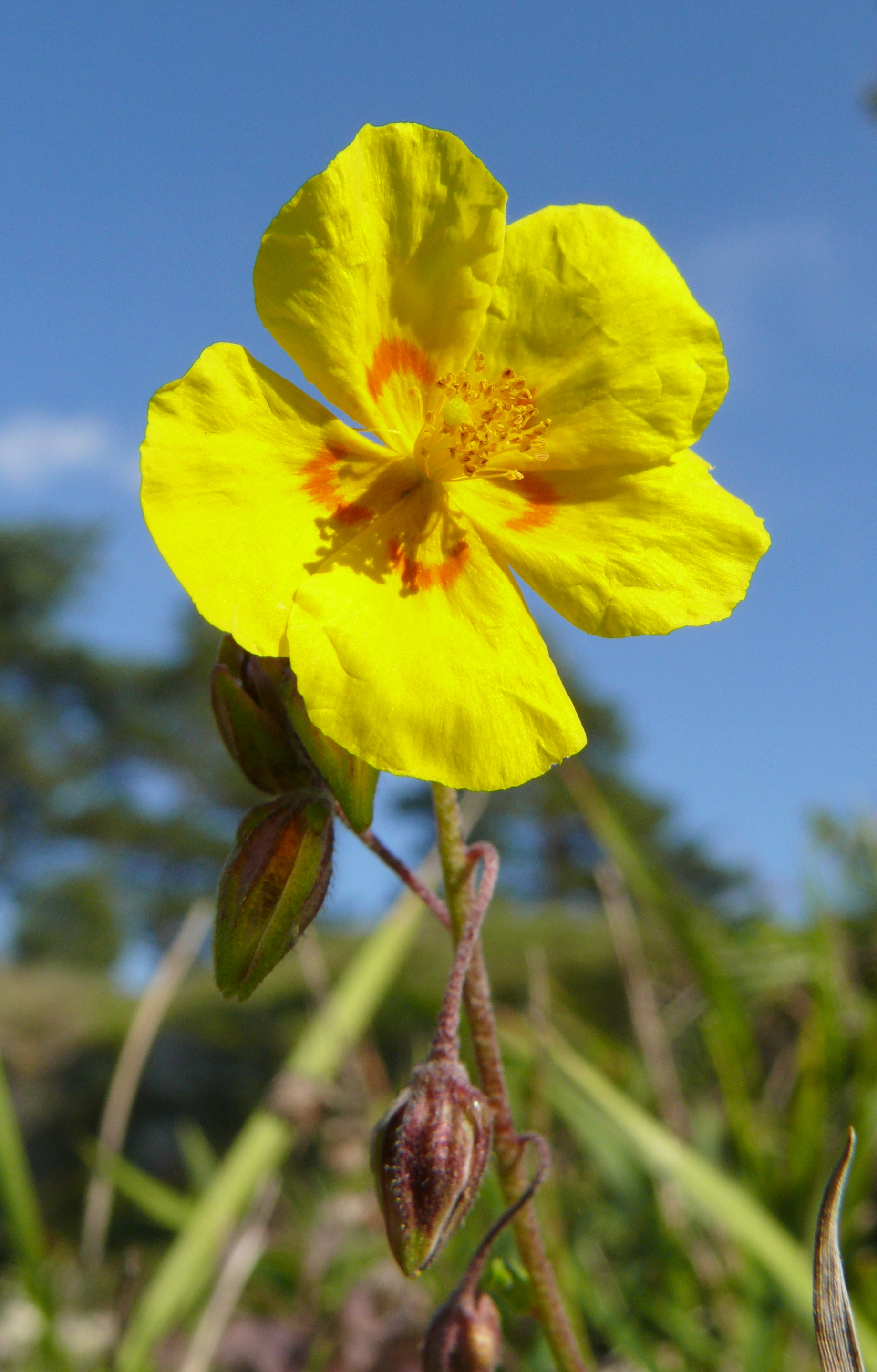
- Helianthemum nummularium

Scientific classification
- Kingdom: Plantae
- Clade: Tracheophytes
- Clade: Angiosperms
- Clade: Eudicots
- Clade: Rosids
- Order: Malvales
- Family: Cistaceae
- Genus: Helianthemum; Mill. (1754)

Species
- See text

Synonyms
- Anthelis Raf. (1813); Aphananthemum Steud. (1840); Atlanthemum Raynaud (1987); Helianthemon St.-Lag. (1880); Psistina Raf. (1838); Psistus Neck. (1790), opus utique oppr.; Rhodax Spach (1836); Taeniostema Spach (1837)

= Helianthemum =

Genus of flowering plants

Helianthemum (/ˌhiːliˈænθɪməm/), known as rock rose, sunrose, rushrose, or frostweed, is a genus of about 114 species of flowering plants in the family Cistaceae. They are widely distributed throughout the Northern Hemisphere, especially in the Mediterranean.

New World species formerly classified as Helianthemum have been transferred to genus Crocanthemum.

== Description ==
These are usually shrubs or subshrubs, and some are herbaceous annuals or perennials. The leaves are oppositely arranged, but some plants may have alternately arranged leaves along the upper stems. The flowers are solitary or borne in an array of inflorescence types, such as panicles, racemes, or headlike clusters. The flower has three inner sepals and two smaller outer sepals. It has five petals usually in shades of yellow, orange, or pink. The style at the center is tipped with a large stigma. The fruit is a capsule containing many seeds.

== Ecology ==
Helianthemum are known to form symbioses with mycorrhizal fungi. In the Mediterranean they are associated with Terfeziaceae, the desert truffles. Together, plant and fungus may have a beneficial effect on the arid local landscapes, preventing soil erosion and desertification. Some symbiotic pairs include Helianthemum salicifolium and the truffle Tirmania nivea, and H. guttatum and T. pinoyi.

One of the most commonly observed mycorrhizae on Helianthemum is a member of a different family, Cenococcum geophilum. This fungus is not host-specific, and it often associates with oaks, as well. Some studies suggest that Helianthemum and oaks growing together in a habitat may "share" their mycorrhizae.

Helianthemum are food plants for the larvae of some Lepidoptera species, such as the large grizzled skipper and the silver-studded blue. The leaf miners Bucculatrix helianthemi and B. regaella both feed exclusively on Helianthemum sessiliflorum, as does Coleophora eupreta. C. ochrea is limited to Helianthemum, and C. bilineella and C. potentillae have been observed on the genus.

== Cultivation ==
Several Helianthemum species, and the numerous hybrids and cultivars derived from them, are widely grown as ornamental plants, popular in rockeries. A broader range of colours is available among the cultivars, including bright salmon-pink to dark red. They are best grown in well-draining soil in full sun, and have a long flowering period from spring to summer. Numerous cultivars have gained the Royal Horticultural Society's Award of Garden Merit:

- 'Amy Baring' (yellow)
- 'Fire Dragon'
- 'Henfield Brilliant' (scarlet)
- 'Jubilee' (pale yellow)
- 'Mrs C.W. Earle' (red)
- 'Rhodanthe Carneum' (pink)
- 'The Bride' (white)
- 'Wisley Primrose' (primrose yellow)

== Species ==
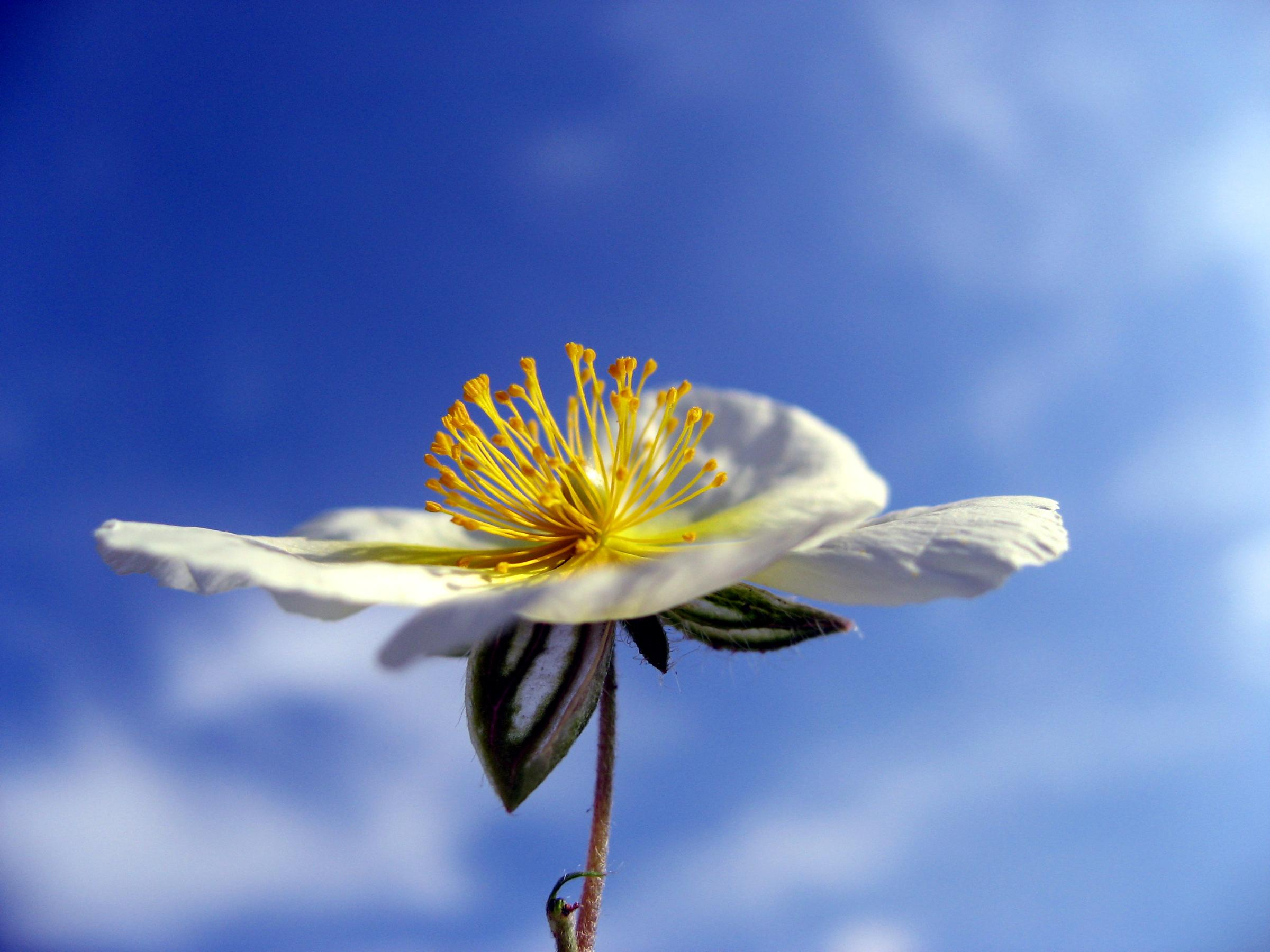
Helianthemum apenninum

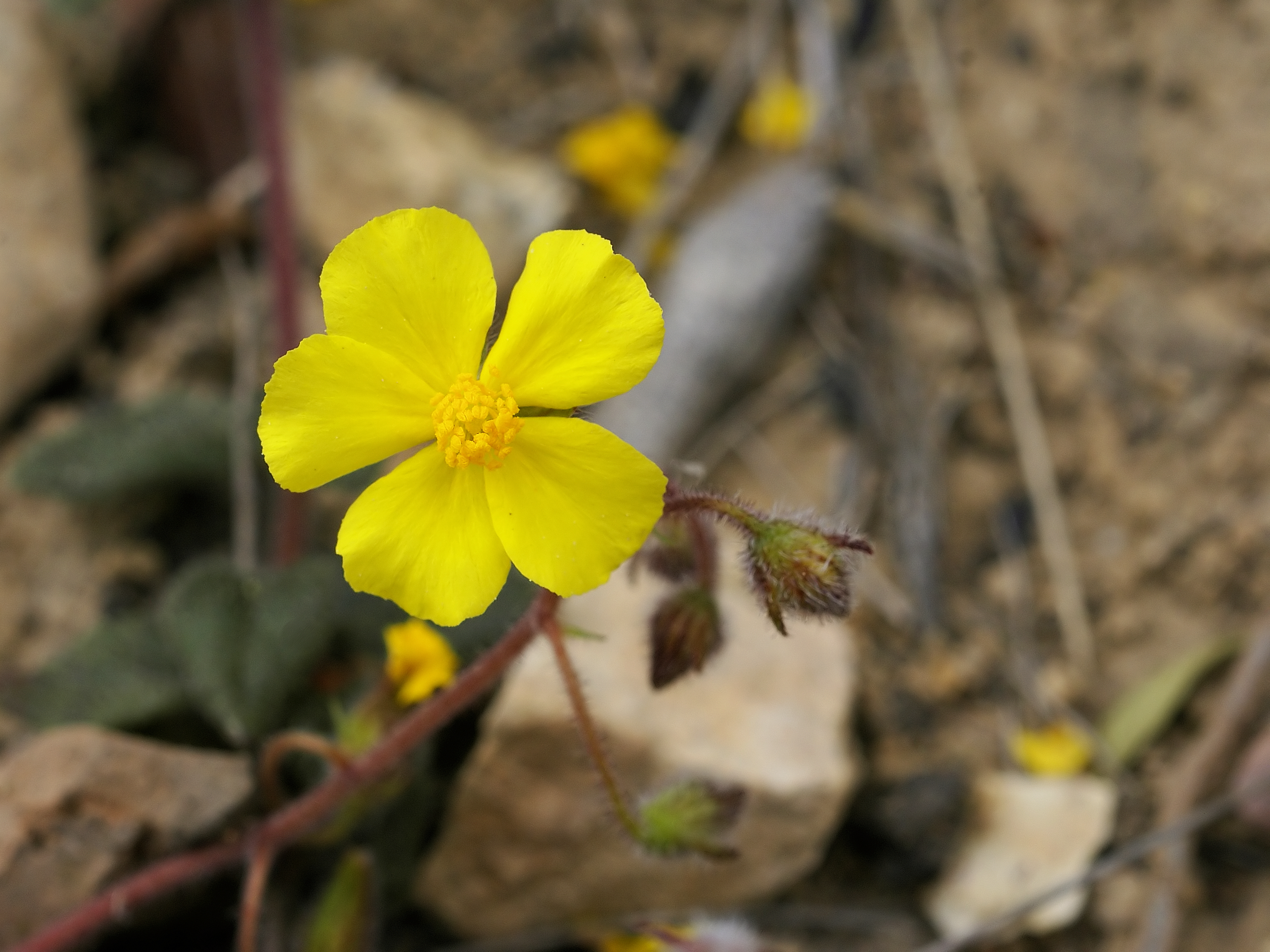
Helianthemum hirtum

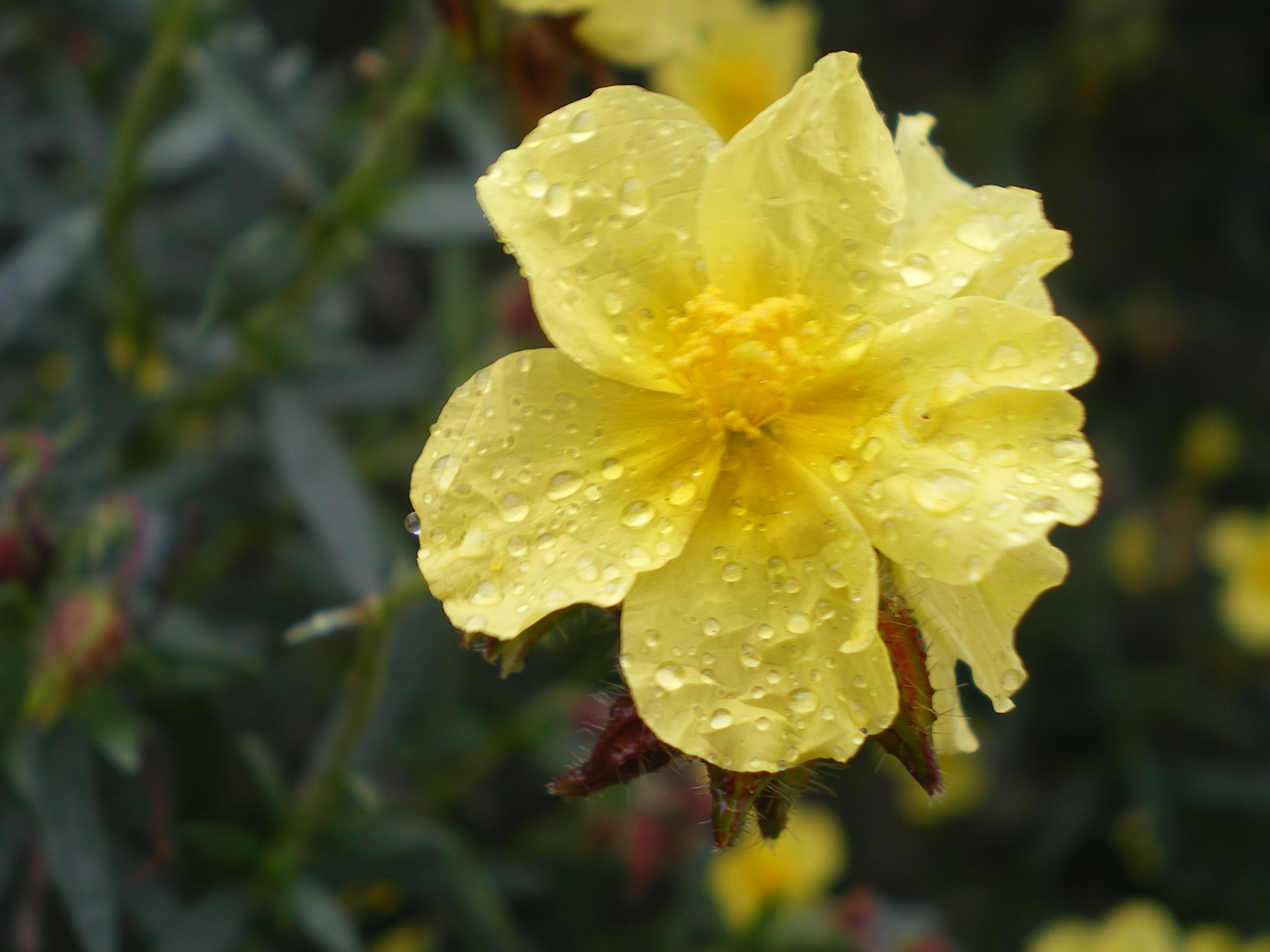
Helianthemum alypoides

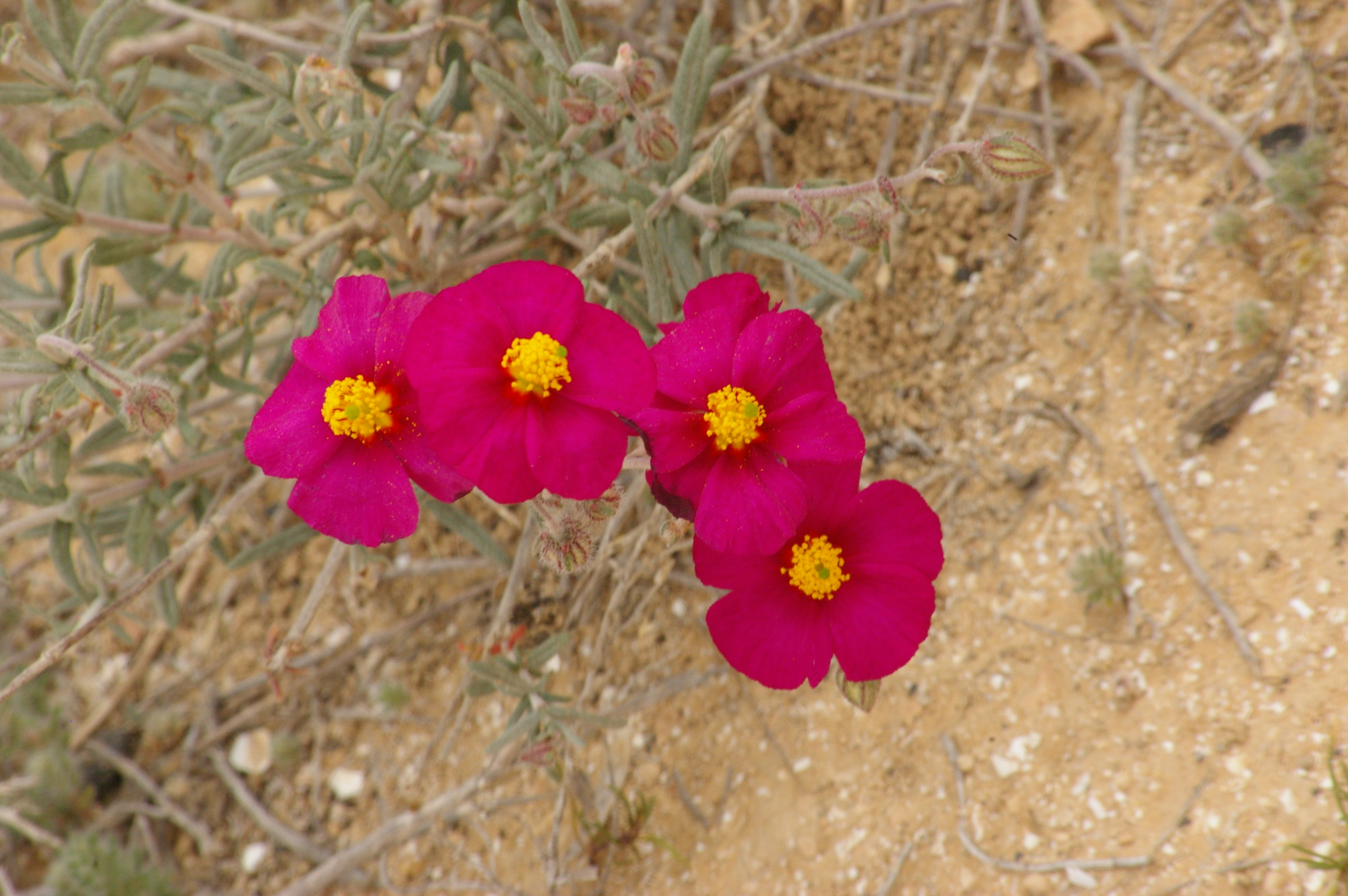
Helianthemum vesicarium

The following species are accepted.

- Helianthemum abelardoi Alcaraz
- Helianthemum aegyptiacum (L.) Mill.
- Helianthemum aganae Marrero Rodr. & R.Mesa
- Helianthemum aguloi Marrero Rodr. & R.Mesa
- Helianthemum almeriense Pau
- Helianthemum alypoides Losa & Rivas Goday
- Helianthemum angustatum Pomel
- Helianthemum antitauricum P.H.Davis & Coode
- Helianthemum apenninum (L.) Mill. – white rockrose
- Helianthemum × asperilanceolatum Mateo, García Cardo & Mart.Labarga
- Helianthemum asperum Lag. ex Dunal
- Helianthemum assadii F.Ghahrem. & Gholamian
- Helianthemum baschkirorum (Juz. ex Kupat.) Juz.
- Helianthemum bilyanense Serra, J.C.Hern., M.Á.Alonso & M.B.Crespo
- Helianthemum bramwelliorum Marrero Rodr.
- Helianthemum broussonetii Dunal
- Helianthemum buschii (Palib.) Juz. & Pozdeeva
- Helianthemum bystropogophyllum Svent.
- Helianthemum canariense (Jacq.) Pers.
- Helianthemum canum (L.) Hornem.
- Helianthemum capralense Pérez Dacosta & Mateo
- Helianthemum caput-felis Boiss.
- Helianthemum × carmen-joanae Mansanet & Mateu
- Helianthemum × carolipaui Cuatrec.
- Helianthemum cinereoflavescens Rech.f., Aellen & Esfand.
- Helianthemum cinereum (Cav.) Pers.
- Helianthemum cirae A.Santos
- Helianthemum ciscaucasicum Juz. & Pozdeeva
- Helianthemum citrinum Ghaz.
- Helianthemum × conchitae Socorro & Aroza
- Helianthemum concolor (L.Riley) J.G.Ortega
- Helianthemum confertum Dunal
- Helianthemum × coronadoi Mateo
- Helianthemum coulteri S.Watson
- Helianthemum crassifolium Pers.
- Helianthemum × crespoi Mateo
- Helianthemum croceum (Desf.) Pers.
- Helianthemum cylindrifolium Verdc.
- Helianthemum dagestanicum Rupr.
- Helianthemum dianicum Pérez Dacosta, M.B.Crespo & Mateo
- Helianthemum × digeneum Rouy & Foucaud
- Helianthemum × doumerguei Faure
- Helianthemum edetanum Mateo, Fabado & C.Torres
- Helianthemum ellipticum (Desf.) Pers.
- Helianthemum eriocephalum Pomel
- Helianthemum × fabadoi Mateo
- Helianthemum × finestratense Pérez Dacosta & Mateo
- Helianthemum fontanesii Boiss. & Reut.
- Helianthemum geniorum Maire
- Helianthemum germanicopolitanum Bornm.
- Helianthemum getulum Pomel
- Helianthemum glaucescens (Murb.) Tzvelev
- Helianthemum gonzalezferreri Marrero Rodr.
- Helianthemum gorgoneum Webb
- Helianthemum grosii Pau & Font Quer
- Helianthemum guerrae Sánchez-Gómez, J.S.Carrion & M.A.Carrión
- Helianthemum × guiraoi Willk.
- Helianthemum hadedense Thulin
- Helianthemum × heerii Brügger
- Helianthemum henriquezii Rebolé, A.Acev.-Rodr. & García García
- Helianthemum hirtum (L.) Mill.
- Helianthemum × hispidum Dunal
- Helianthemum hymettium Boiss. & Heldr.
- Helianthemum inaguae Marrero Rodr., Gonz.-Mart. & F.González
- Helianthemum juliae Wildpret
- Helianthemum kahiricum Delile
- Helianthemum kotschyanum Boiss.
- Helianthemum × lagunae Mateo
- Helianthemum ledifolium (L.) Mill.
- Helianthemum leptophyllum Dunal
- Helianthemum linii A.Santos
- Helianthemum lippii (L.) Dum.Cours.
- Helianthemum × lucentinum M.B.Crespo & J.C.Cristóbal
- Helianthemum lunulatum (All.) DC.
- Helianthemum × mansanetianum Mateo
- Helianthemum × mariano-salvatoris Alcaraz & al.
- Helianthemum marifolium (L.) Mill.
- Helianthemum maritimum Pomel
- Helianthemum marminorense Alcaraz, Peinado & Mart.Parras
- Helianthemum marmoreum Stevan., Matevski & Kit Tan
- Helianthemum mathezii Dobignard
- Helianthemum × monspessulanum Rouy & Foucaud
- Helianthemum × montis-bovis Mateo
- Helianthemum morisianum Bertol.
- Helianthemum motae Sánchez-Gómez, J.F.Jiménez & J.B.Vera
- Helianthemum × moyense Mateo, García Cardo & Mart.Labarga
- Helianthemum × murbeckii Faure
- Helianthemum neopiliferum Muñoz Garm. & C.Navarro
- Helianthemum nummularium (L.) Mill. – common rockrose
- Helianthemum obtusifolium Dunal
- Helianthemum oelandicum (L.) Dum.Cours. – alpine rockrose, hoary rockrose (syn. Helianthemum montanum)
  - Helianthemum oelandicum subsp. alpestre (syn. H. alpestre)
  - Helianthemum oelandicum subsp. italicum (syn. H. italicum)
  - Helianthemum oelandicum subsp. oelandicum
  - Helianthemum oelandicum subsp. orientale (syn. H. orientale)
  - Helianthemum oelandicum subsp. rupifragum (syn. H. rupifragum)
- Helianthemum oelandicum (L.) Dum.Cours.
- Helianthemum ordosicum Y.Z.Zhao, Zong Y.Zhu & R.Cao
- Helianthemum origanifolium (Lam.) Pers.
- Helianthemum pannosum Boiss.
- Helianthemum papillare Boiss.
- Helianthemum patens Hemsl.
- Helianthemum pergamaceum Pomel
- Helianthemum × petrerense Pérez Dacosta & Mateo
- Helianthemum polyanthum (Desf.) Pers.
- Helianthemum polygonoides Peinado, Mart.Parras, Alcaraz & Espuelas
- Helianthemum pomeridianum Dunal
- Helianthemum × protodianicum J.M.Aparicio, Pérez Dacosta & Mateo
- Helianthemum × pseudodianicum Pérez Dacosta & Mateo
- Helianthemum pugae Calderón
- Helianthemum raskebdanae M.A.Alonso, M.B.Crespo, Juan & L.Sáez
- Helianthemum × rigualii M.B.Crespo & J.C.Cristóbal
- Helianthemum rossmaessleri Willk.
- Helianthemum rotundifolium Dunal
- Helianthemum ruficomum (Viv.) Spreng.
- Helianthemum salicifolium (L.) Mill.
- Helianthemum sancti-antoni Schweinf. ex Boiss.
- Helianthemum sanguineum (Lag.) Dunal
- Helianthemum sauvagei Raynaud
- Helianthemum schweinfurthii Grosser
- Helianthemum scopulicola L.Sáez, Rosselló & Alomar
- Helianthemum sessiliflorum (Desf.) Pers.
- Helianthemum sicanorum Brullo, Giusso & Sciandr.
- Helianthemum sinuspersicum Gholamian & F.Ghahrem.
- Helianthemum somalense J.B.Gillett
- Helianthemum songaricum Schrenk ex Fisch. & C.A.Mey.
- Helianthemum speciosum Thulin
- Helianthemum squamatum (L.) Dum.Cours.
- Helianthemum stipulatum (Forssk.) C.Chr.
- Helianthemum strickeri Grosser
- Helianthemum × subhispidulum Faure & Maire
- Helianthemum × subviscosum Faure & Maire
- Helianthemum × sulphureum Willd.
- Helianthemum supramontanum Arrigoni
- Helianthemum syriacum (Jacq.) Dum.Cours.
- Helianthemum syrticum (Viv.) Spreng.
- Helianthemum teneriffae Coss.
- Helianthemum tholiforme Bramwell, J.Ortega & B.Navarro
- Helianthemum thymiphyllum Svent.
- Helianthemum × triregnorum Mateo
- Helianthemum ventosum Boiss.
- Helianthemum vesicarium Boiss.
- Helianthemum violaceum (Cav.) Pers.
- Helianthemum virgatum (Desf.) Pers.
- Helianthemum viscarium Boiss. & Reut.
- Helianthemum viscidulum Boiss.
- Helianthemum × xixonense Pérez Dacosta & Mateo
- Helianthemum zheguliense Juz. ex Tzvelev
