= Parafomoria helianthemella =

Scientific classification
- Kingdom: Animalia
- Phylum: Arthropoda
- Class: Insecta
- Order: Lepidoptera
- Family: Nepticulidae
- Genus: Parafomoria
- Species: P. helianthemella

Binomial name
- Parafomoria helianthemella (Herrich-Schaffer, 1860)

Synonyms
- Nepticula helianthemella Herrich-Schaffer, 1860; Stigmella helianthemella

Species of moth

Parafomoria helianthemella is a moth of the family Nepticulidae. It is found in central and southern Europe, including Germany, south-eastern Poland, the Czech Republic, Slovakia, Hungary, Austria, Switzerland, northern Italy, France (the Alps and Pyrenees) and Bulgaria.

The length of the forewings is 1.7–2 mm for males and 1.6-2.2 mm for females. Adults are on wing from March to April (occasionally May), in July and from August to September. There are three generations per year in Hungary.

The larvae feed on Helianthemum canum, Helianthemum nummularium, Helianthemum oelandicum alpestre and Helianthemum oelandicum incanum and Helianthemum salicifolium. They mine the leaves of their host plant.
