= Coleophora eupreta =

Scientific classification
- Kingdom: Animalia
- Phylum: Arthropoda
- Class: Insecta
- Order: Lepidoptera
- Family: Coleophoridae
- Genus: Coleophora
- Species: C. eupreta

Binomial name
- Coleophora eupreta Walsingham, 1907

Synonyms
- Coleophora argentariella Klimesch, 1951; Coleophora gozmanyi Toll, 1960; Colephora circumdatella Turati, 1934

Species of moth

Coleophora eupreta is a moth of the family Coleophoridae. It is found in France, Spain, Portugal, Italy and North Macedonia.

The larvae feed on Helianthemum apenninum, Helianthemum canum, Helianthemum guttatum, Helianthemum lavandulifolium, Helianthemum nummularium and Helianthemum sessiliflorum.
