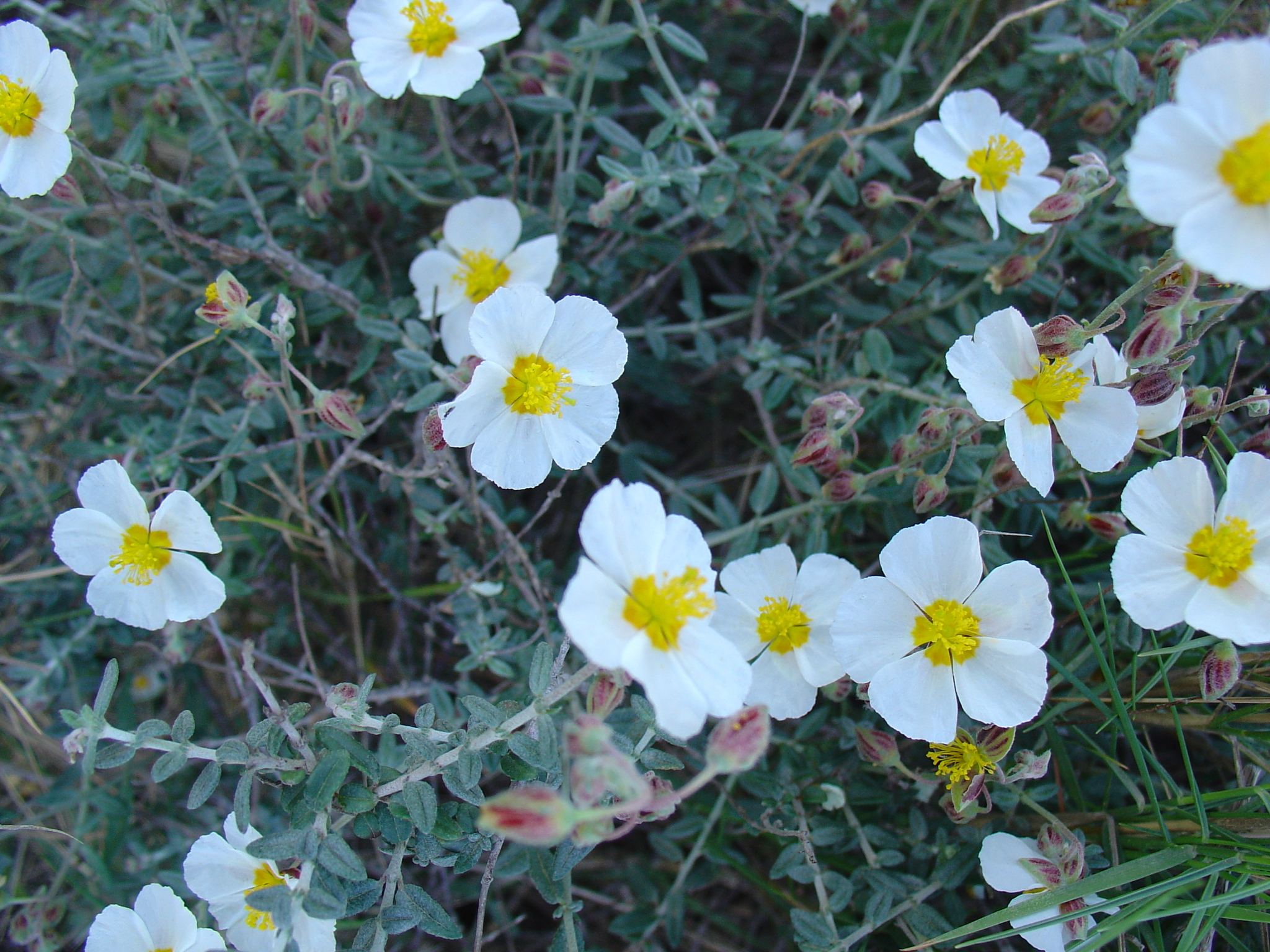

Scientific classification
- Kingdom: Plantae
- Clade: Tracheophytes
- Clade: Angiosperms
- Clade: Eudicots
- Clade: Rosids
- Order: Malvales
- Family: Cistaceae
- Genus: Helianthemum
- Species: H. almeriense

Binomial name
- Helianthemum almeriense Pau, Mem. Mus. Ci. Nat. Barcelona, Ser. Bot. 1(3): 11, 1925

= Helianthemum almeriense =

Species of plant

Helianthemum almeriense, also known as jarilla, mata turmera or tormera in Spanish, is a very branched woody plant of the Cistaceae family, with showy white flowers, which blooms in winter and spring.

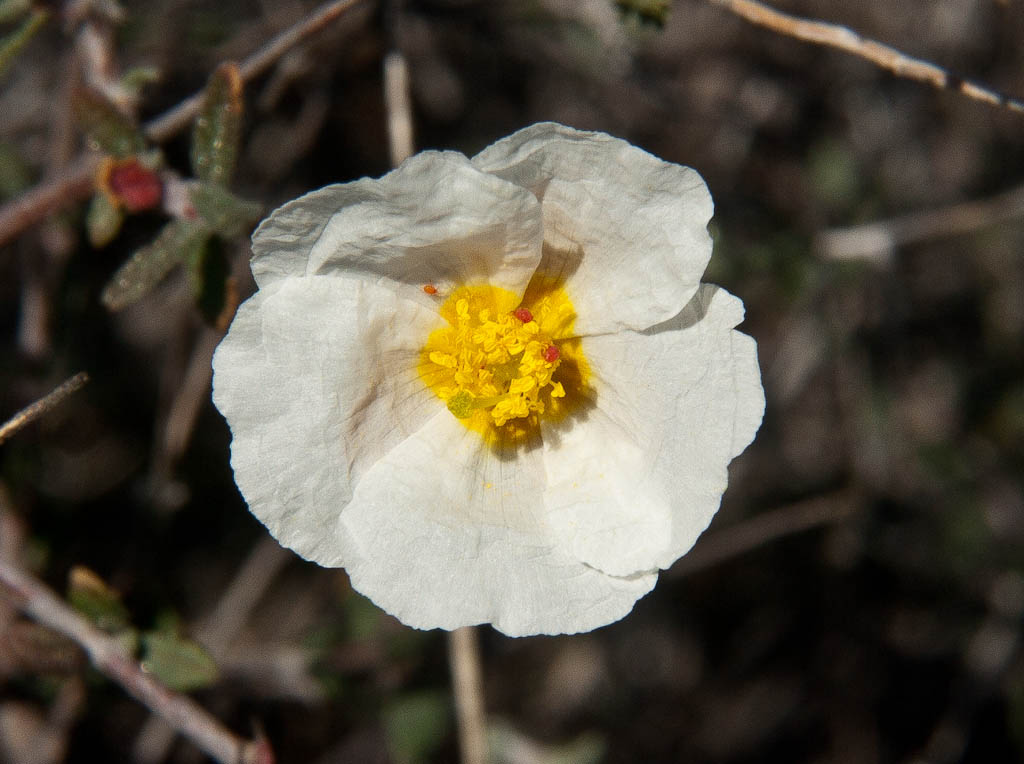
Detail of the flower.

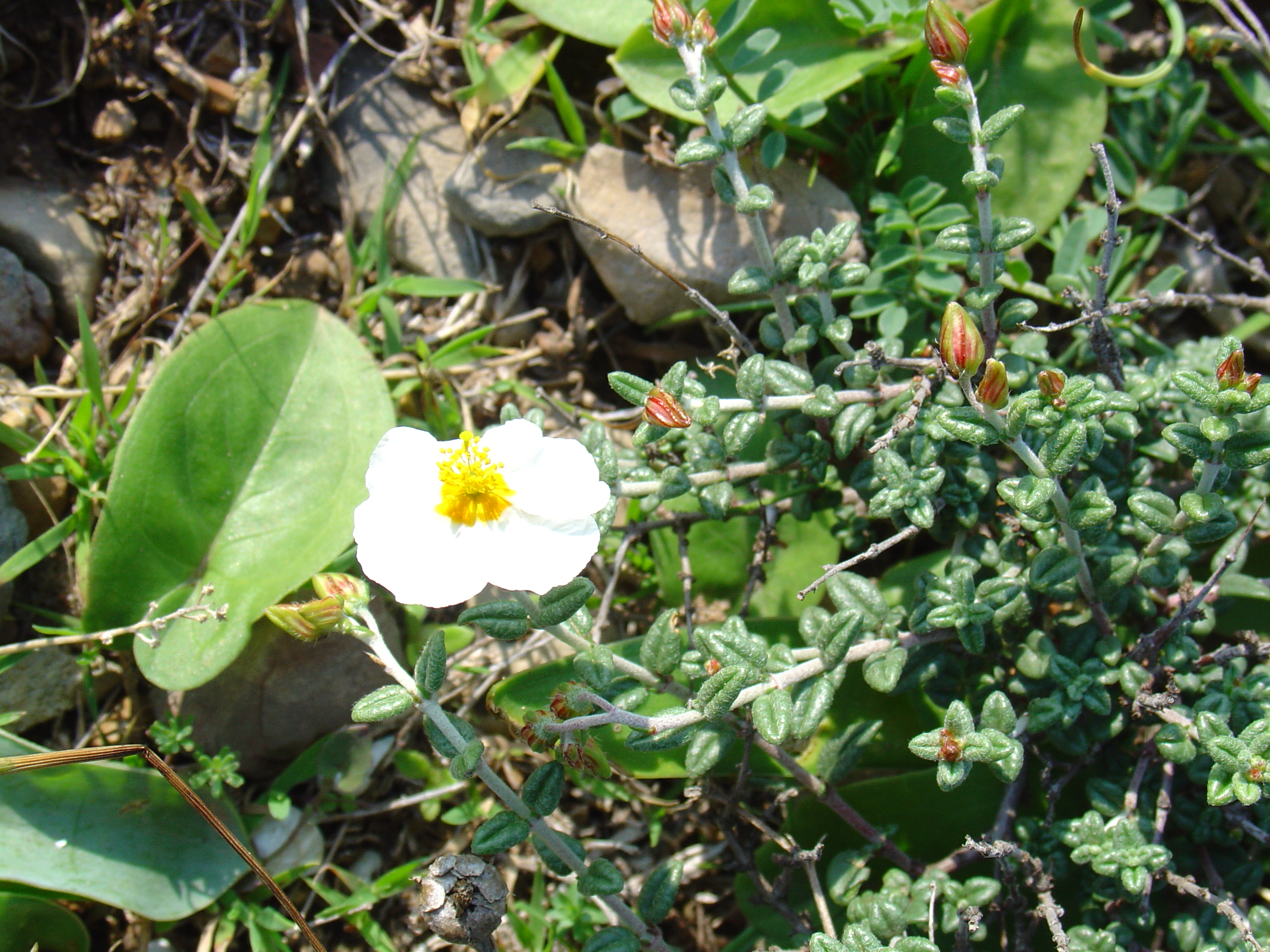
View of the plant.

== Description ==
Perennial plant, 8–60 cm high, fruticose, intricately branched; more or less tortuous vine, generally divaricate branches. Stems patent, divaricate, rarely erect-ascending, glabrous to incano-tomentose, reddish-brown. Leaves elliptic to oblong-lanceolate or linear-lanceolate, rarely suborbicular, obtuse, flat or more rarely with somewhat revolute margin, glabrous to sparsely stellate-pubescent on the upper side, and glabrous underside, more rarely stellate-pubescent or tomentose, and with lateral veins generally not very prominent; blade 2-18 by 0.6–4 mm; stipules up to 2–3.5 mm, shorter or longer than petiole, subulate or triangular-subulate, apex often piliferous, glabrous or more or less hairy, green. Inflorescence simple, somewhat lax, 2-10-flowered.

Flower buds ovoid-conical, acute, with distinctly twisted apex. Inner sepals 4–8 mm -from 5–8.5 mm in fruiting-, obliquely ovate-elliptic, subobtuse, membranaceous, glabrous, less frequently stellate-pubescent, generally purplish, with intercostal spaces about 1 mm in maximum width, and prominently ribbed, rarely setose; outer sepals linear-spatulate to elliptic, about 1/3 as long as inner sepals, glabrous or glabrescent, greenish. Petals 6–12 mm, obovate-flabeliform, somewhat wrinkled, sometimes retuse, white, more rarely pinkish, maculate. Fruit in capsule 4.5–7 mm, similar or shorter in length than the calyx, globose or ellipsoidal, densely hairy, polyspermous. Seeds 1.2-1.5 mm, brownish brown or dark reddish brown.

== Habitat and distribution ==
In thyme fields and cleared places, in dry, stony, limestone, micaceous, loamy soils or in gypsum wastelands, sometimes also in volcanic soils and even in sandy soils (beaches); from sea level up to 1200 m altitude. Arid southeast of the Iberian Peninsula; it has also been cited from Morocco, where its presence would need to be confirmed.

== Ecology ==
Its presence is related to that of a mycorrhizal fungus: Terfezia claveryi or turma, which is of the so-called desert truffles (fam. Terfeziaceae), subterranean and edible, of culinary interest and as food for livestock. This characteristic is translated into some of the vernacular names of the species - and others of the genus Helianthemum, such as Mata turmera and Tormera (in Spanish).

== Taxonomy ==
Helianthemum almeriense was described by Carlos Pau Español and published in Mem. Mus. Ci. Nat. Barcelona, Ser. Bot. i. No. 3, 11 (1925).

=== Etymology ===
- Helianthemum: generic name derived from the ancient Greek Ἥλιος (Helios), "the Sun" and ανθεμοζ, ον (anthemos, on), "flowered", since the flowers only open with the heat of the sun (they need a temperature above 20 °C to unfold their petals) and have a certain positive phototropism. Certain vernacular names in Spanish, such as Mirasol, would corroborate this interpretation. Authors argue that its name is due to the resemblance of the yellow flowers with the sun; however many species are white, orange, pink or purple, which does not fit with this interpretation. Others for the affection that the genus would have for sunny places.
- almeriense: geographic epithet that alludes to its location in Almería.

=== Infraspecific taxa ===
- Helianthemum almeriense var. scopulorum (Rouy) Losa & Rivas Goday

=== Synonymy ===
- Helianthemum almeriense subsp. scopulorum (Rouy) Rivas Mart. & al.
- Helianthemum almeriense var. almerianum Losa & Rivas Goday
- Helianthemum almeriense var. minutifolium Rigual ex O.Bolòs & Vigo
- Helianthemum eulaliae var. foliosum Sennen
- Helianthemum eulaliae Sennen
- Helianthemum leptophyllum f. psilosepalum Willk.
- Helianthemum leptophyllum f. squarrosum Grosser in Engl.
- Helianthemum leptophyllum subsp. almeriense (Pau) Sagredo & Malag. in Malag.
- Helianthemum leptophyllum subsp. scopulorum (Rouy) Sagredo & Malag. in Malag.
- Helianthemum psilosepalum (Willk.) Sennen
- Helianthemum rigualii Alcaraz, Peinado & Mart.Parras
- Helianthemum violaceum f. minutifolium Pau

== Bibliography ==
- Alcaraz Ariza, F. (2002). Flora básica de la Región de Murcia (in Spanish). 54-600-9378-6: Sociedad Cooperativa de Enseñanza "Severo Ochoa".
