= Gorgonum =

Gorgonum or Gorgoneum may refer to:

== Flora ==
- Aeonium gorgoneum, a flower species found in Cape Verde
- Artemisia gorgonum, a sagebrush species found in Cape Verde
- Elaphoglossum gorgoneum, a fern species in the subfamily Elaphoglossoideae
- Helianthemum gorgoneum, a sunflower species found in Cape Verde
- Papaver gorgoneum, a flower species found in Cape Verde

== Other ==
- Gorgonum, a classical albedo feature located in the northwest of the Phaethontis quadrangle on Mars
- Gorgonum Chaos, a chaotic feature located in the northwest of the Phaethontis quadrangle on Mars
