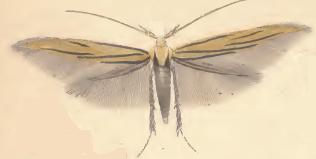

Scientific classification
- Kingdom: Animalia
- Phylum: Arthropoda
- Clade: Pancrustacea
- Class: Insecta
- Order: Lepidoptera
- Family: Coleophoridae
- Genus: Coleophora
- Species: C. ochrea

Binomial name
- Coleophora ochrea (Haworth, 1828)

Synonyms
- List: Porrectaria ochrea Haworth, 1828; Coleophora argentivittella Toll, 1952; Coleophora digrammella Toll, 1954; Ornix argentipennella Duponchel, 1838; Coleophora argentipennella; Coleophora hapsella Zeller, 1839; Coleophora ochraea castelensis Rebel, 1919; Coleophora quadrilineolella Turati, 1932

= Coleophora ochrea =

Species of moth

Coleophora ochrea is a moth of the family Coleophoridae found in Europe. It was first described by Adrian Hardy Haworth in 1828.

== Description ==
The wingspan is 15–19 mm (0.59–0.75 in). Adults have ochreous forewings. They are on wing from July to August.

The larvae feed on white rock-rose (Helianthemum apenninum), common rock-rose (Helianthemum nummularium), Helianthemum nummularium obscurum and annual rock-rose (Tuberaria guttata). Larvae can be found from September to the end of May of the following year.

== Distribution ==
It is found from Sweden to the Iberian Peninsula, Italy and Crete and from Great Britain to southern Russia.
