= Carex paui =

Scientific classification
- Kingdom: Plantae
- Clade: Tracheophytes
- Clade: Angiosperms
- Clade: Monocots
- Clade: Commelinids
- Order: Poales
- Family: Cyperaceae
- Genus: Carex
- Species: C. paui

Binomial name
- Carex paui Sennen

Synonyms
- Carex algeriensis Nelmes; Carex laxula (Tineo ex Guss.) Tineo ex Benítez & al.; Carex sylvatica subsp. laxula (Tineo ex Guss.) K.Richt.; Carex sylvatica subsp. paui (Sennen) Sennen

Species of flowering plant

Carex paui is a rare species of sedge (family Cyperaceae), with a western Mediterranean distribution; Morocco, Algeria, Tunisia, Spain, (including the Balearic Islands), and Italy (Elba and Sicily). Some authorities considered it a synonym of Carex laxula, but as that name was not validly published, Carex paui was the next available name.
