= Phyllonorycter helianthemella =

Scientific classification
- Domain: Eukaryota
- Kingdom: Animalia
- Phylum: Arthropoda
- Class: Insecta
- Order: Lepidoptera
- Family: Gracillariidae
- Genus: Phyllonorycter
- Species: P. helianthemella

Binomial name
- Phyllonorycter helianthemella (Herrich-Schäffer, 1861)

Synonyms
- Lithocolletis helianthemella Herrich-Schäffer, 1861; Triberta helianthemella (Herrich-Schäffer, 1861)

Species of moth

Phyllonorycter helianthemella is a moth of the family Gracillariidae. It is found from Germany to the Iberian Peninsula, Italy and Greece and also on the Canary Islands (La Palma and Tenerife).

== Ecology ==
The larvae feed on Cistus monspeliensis, Cistus salvifolius, and Helianthemum canariense. They mine the leaves of their host plant.
