= Coleophora bilineella =

Scientific classification
- Kingdom: Animalia
- Phylum: Arthropoda
- Class: Insecta
- Order: Lepidoptera
- Family: Coleophoridae
- Genus: Coleophora
- Species: C. bilineella

Binomial name
- Coleophora bilineella Herrich-Schaffer, 1855

Synonyms
- Coleophora zonatella Toll, 1960

Species of moth

Coleophora bilineella is a moth of the family Coleophoridae. It is found in southern Europe (south of France, Switzerland and Romania).

The larvae feed on Cistus monspeliensis, Cistus salvifolius, Fumana, Helianthemum canum and Helianthemum hirtum.
