= Helianthemum guerrae =

Conservation status
- Endangered (IUCN 3.1)

Scientific classification
- Kingdom: Plantae
- Clade: Tracheophytes
- Clade: Angiosperms
- Clade: Eudicots
- Clade: Rosids
- Order: Malvales
- Family: Cistaceae
- Genus: Helianthemum
- Species: H. guerrae

Binomial name
- Helianthemum guerrae Sánchez-Gómez, J.S.Carrión & M.Á.Carrión

Species of flowering plant

Helianthemum guerrae is a species of plant in the family Cistaceae. It is endemic to Spain. Its natural habitat is Mediterranean Matorral shrubland vegetation. It is threatened by habitat loss.
