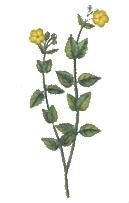

Scientific classification
- Kingdom: Plantae
- Clade: Tracheophytes
- Clade: Angiosperms
- Clade: Eudicots
- Clade: Rosids
- Order: Malvales
- Family: Cistaceae
- Genus: Helianthemum
- Species: H. marifolium

Binomial name
- Helianthemum marifolium Mill.

= Helianthemum marifolium =

Species of flowering plant

Helianthemum marifolium (syn. Helianthemum alpinum Delarbre) is an endangered ornamental plant in the family Cistaceae.
