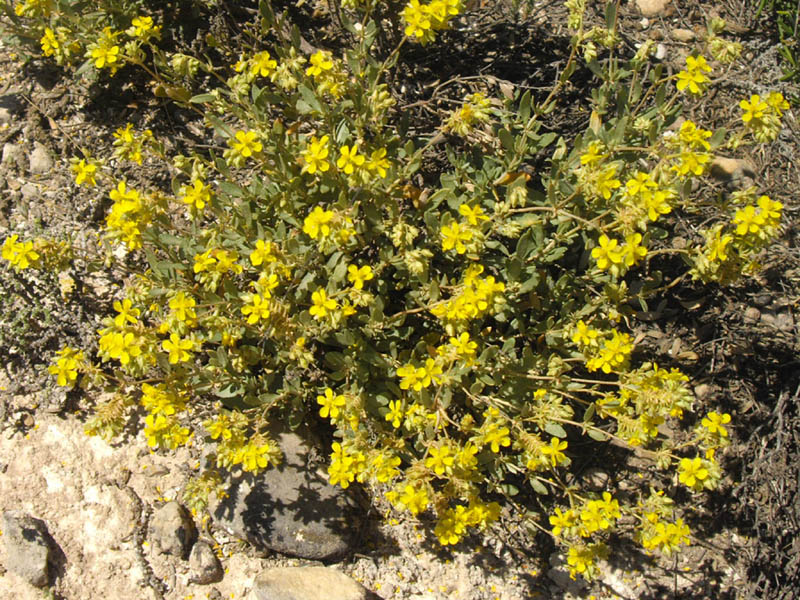

Scientific classification
- Kingdom: Plantae
- Clade: Tracheophytes
- Clade: Angiosperms
- Clade: Eudicots
- Clade: Rosids
- Order: Malvales
- Family: Cistaceae
- Genus: Helianthemum
- Species: H. squamatum

Binomial name
- Helianthemum squamatum Pers.

Synonyms
- Cistus squamatus L.

= Helianthemum squamatum =

Species of flowering plant

Helianthemum squamatum is a species of low woody herbaceous plant native to Spain and Algeria. It is the only known species able to extract water of crystallization from rock and is able to derive up to 90% of its fluid requirements from gypsum using this process.

By comparing the isotope composition of the plant's sap water to the isotopic composition of free water in the soil and water of crystallization within gypsum it was discovered by Sara Palacio of the Instituto Pirenaico de Ecología and Juan Pedro Ferrio of the University of Lleida that between 70% and 90% of the sap water came from gypsum during the summer months.
