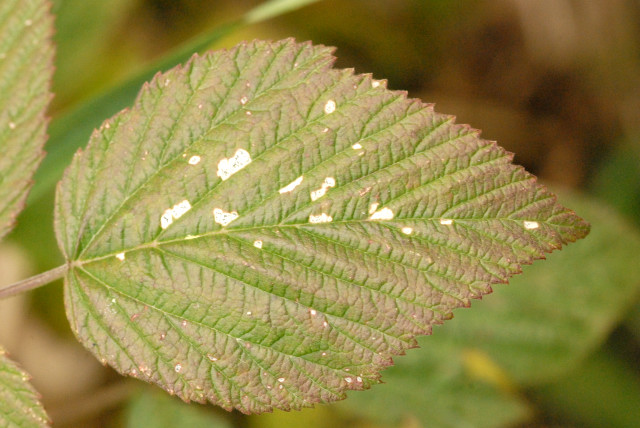
- mines Images of imago

Scientific classification
- Kingdom: Animalia
- Phylum: Arthropoda
- Class: Insecta
- Order: Lepidoptera
- Family: Coleophoridae
- Genus: Coleophora
- Species: C. potentillae

Binomial name
- Coleophora potentillae Elisha, 1885

Synonyms
- Coleophora bothnicella Kanerva, 1941

= Coleophora potentillae =

Species of moth

Coleophora potentillae is a moth of the family Coleophoridae. It is found from Fennoscandia to the Pyrenees, and from Ireland to Poland.

== Description ==
The wingspan is 8–10 mm. Coleophora species have narrow blunt to pointed forewings and a weakly defined tornus. The hindwings are narrow-elongate and very long-fringed. The upper surfaces have neither a discal spot nor transverse lines. Each abdomen segment of the abdomen has paired patches of tiny spines which show through the scales. The resting position is horizontal with the front end raised and the cilia give the hind tip a frayed and upturned look if the wings are rolled around the body. C. potentillae characteristics include: Head shining bronze. Antennae white, ringed with dark fuscous, basal joint dark fuscous. Forewings rather shining bronze or greyish-bronze. Hindwings dark grey.

Adults are on wing from June to August and there is one generation per year.
