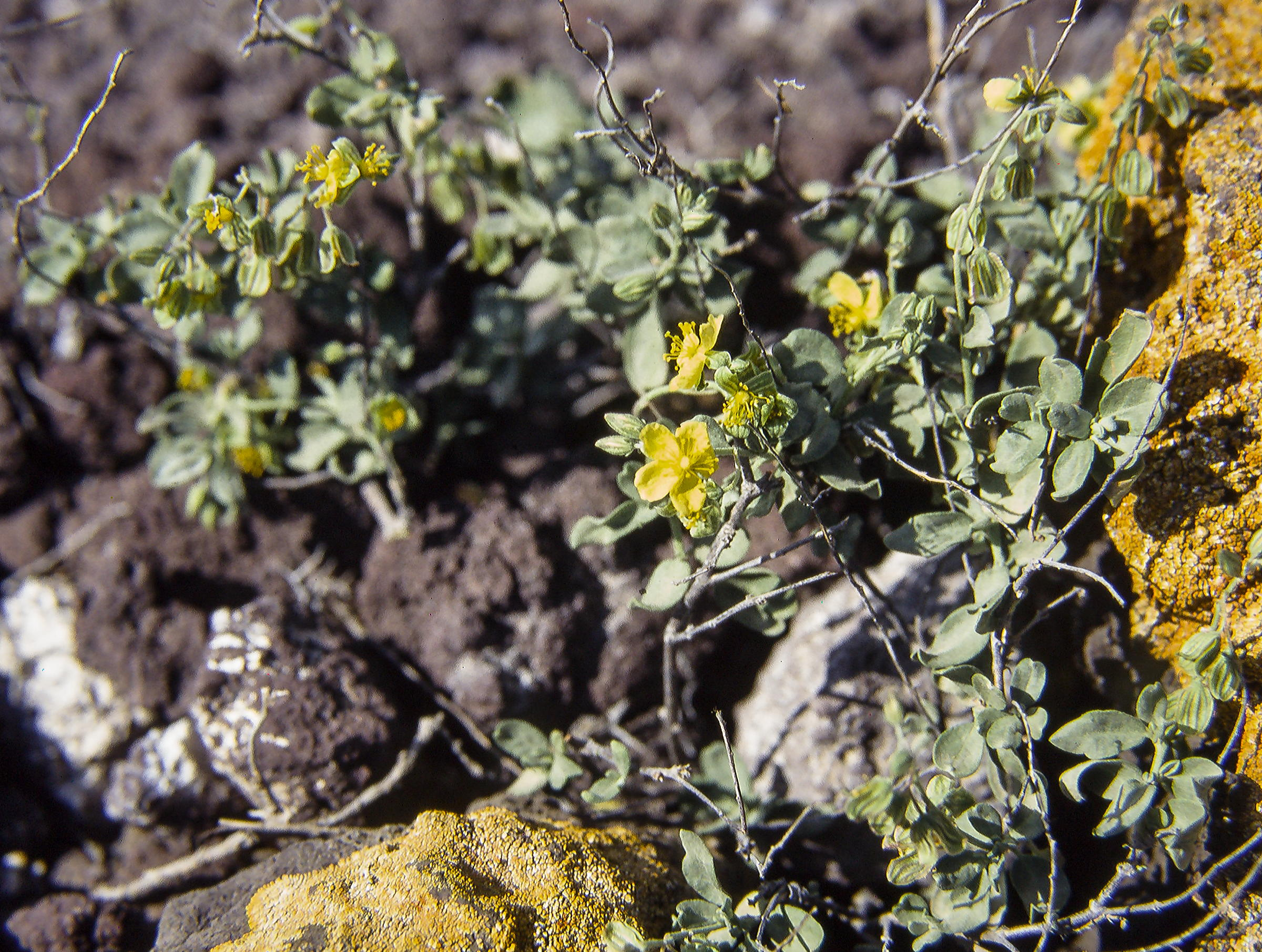
- In habitat at Punta Roja, Tenerife

Scientific classification
- Kingdom: Plantae
- Clade: Tracheophytes
- Clade: Angiosperms
- Clade: Eudicots
- Clade: Rosids
- Order: Malvales
- Family: Cistaceae
- Genus: Helianthemum
- Species: H. canariense

Binomial name
- Helianthemum canariense (Jacq.) Pers.

Synonyms
- Cistus canariensis Jacq.; Fumana canariensis (Jacq.) Raf.; Helianthemum canescens Moench; Helianthemum mucronatum Dunal

= Helianthemum canariense =

Species of flowering plant

Helianthemum canariense is a species of flowering plant in the family Cistaceae, native to Western Sahara, Morocco and the Canary Islands.

== Description ==
Helianthemum canariense is a short, densely branched shrub up to 25 cm (10 in) tall. Its oval leaves are greyish in appearance due to a dense covering of short hairs, and are 5–10 mm (0.2–0.4 in) long. The pale yellow flowers are about 1–2 cm (0.4–0.8 in) across.

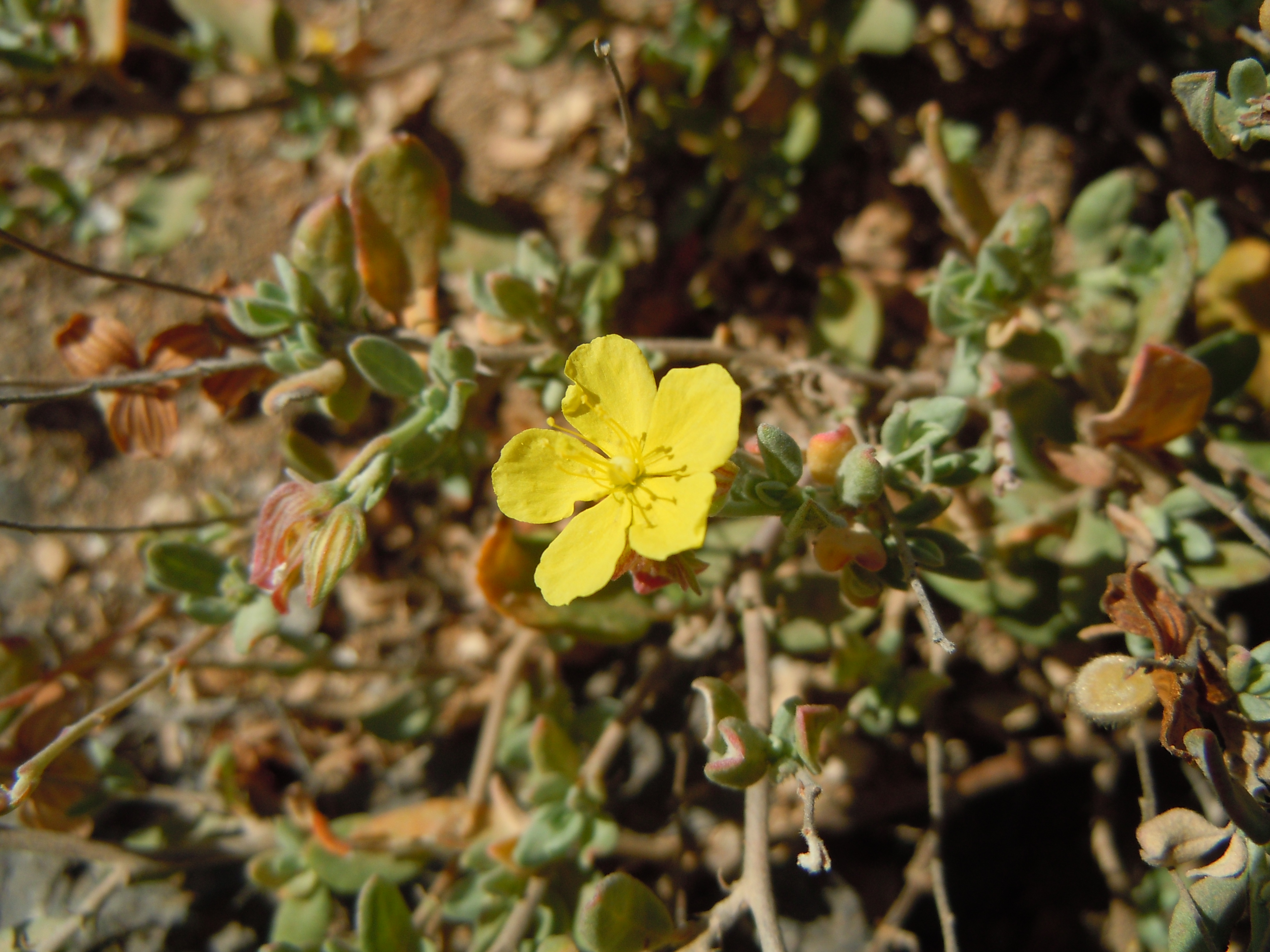
Flower

== Taxonomy ==
The species was first described by Nikolaus von Jacquin in 1781 or 1782, as Cistus canariensis, and transferred to Helianthemum in 1806 by Christiaan Persoon.

== Distribution and habitat ==
Helianthemum canariense is native to the Canary Islands, Western Sahara and Morocco. In the Canary Islands, it is found on all islands in dry areas, up to altitudes of 600 m (2,000 ft).
