= Helianthemum gorgoneum =

Conservation status
- Endangered (IUCN 3.1)

Scientific classification
- Kingdom: Plantae
- Clade: Tracheophytes
- Clade: Angiosperms
- Clade: Eudicots
- Clade: Rosids
- Order: Malvales
- Family: Cistaceae
- Genus: Helianthemum
- Species: H. gorgoneum

Binomial name
- Helianthemum gorgoneum Webb

Species of flowering plant

Helianthemum gorgoneum is a species of flowering plants of the family Cistaceae. The species is endemic to Cape Verde. It is listed as an endangered plant by the IUCN.

The species is found in the west of Cape Verde, in the islands of Santo Antão, Santa Luzia, Fogo and Brava. The plant is found from sea level up to 1,500 m (4,900 ft) elevation. It is a mesophyte that grows in sub-humid and semi-arid areas. It grows on rocky and volcanic soils.
