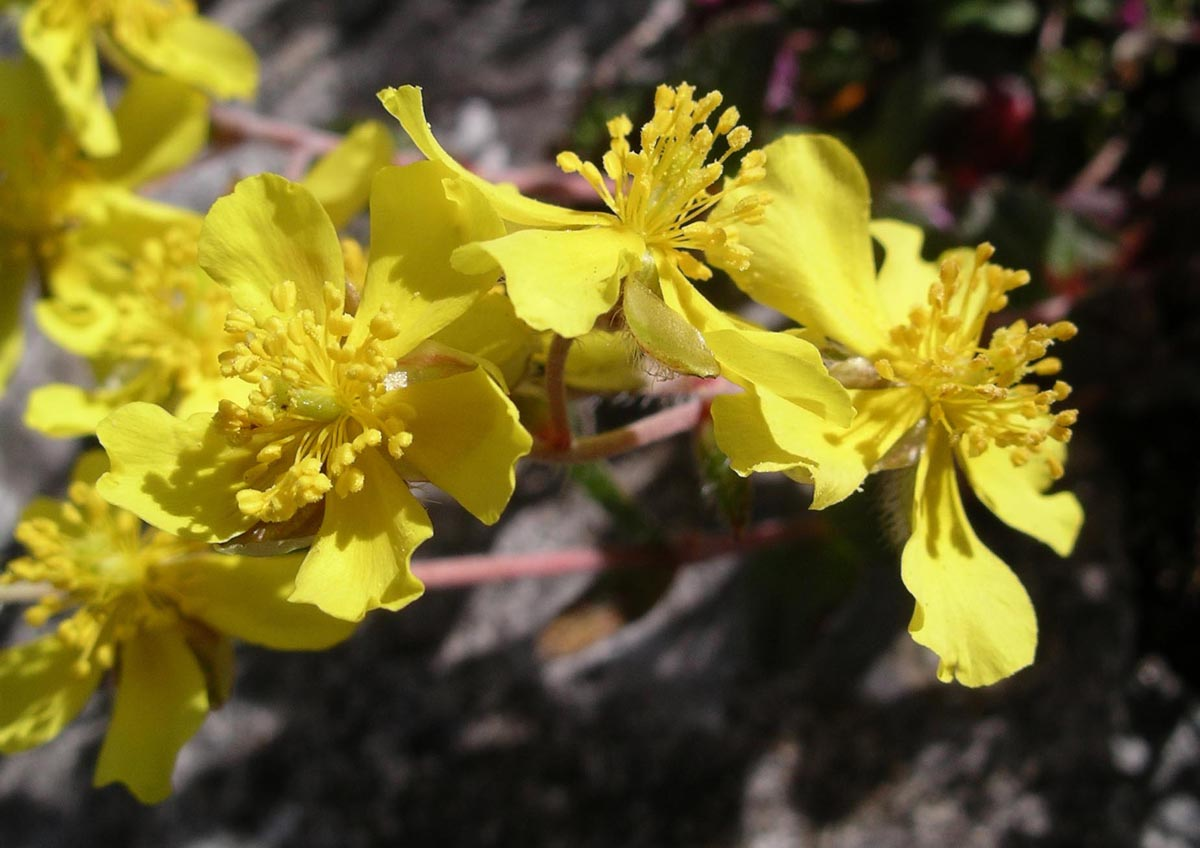
- Helianthemum canum

Scientific classification
- Kingdom: Plantae
- Clade: Tracheophytes
- Clade: Angiosperms
- Clade: Eudicots
- Clade: Rosids
- Order: Malvales
- Family: Cistaceae
- Genus: Helianthemum
- Species: H. oelandicum

Binomial name
- Helianthemum oelandicum DC & Lamarck

= Helianthemum oelandicum =

Species of flowering plant

Helianthemum oelandicum, commonly called hoary rockrose, is a low-growing plant confined to rocky dry calcareous areas especially close to the sea.

== Description ==
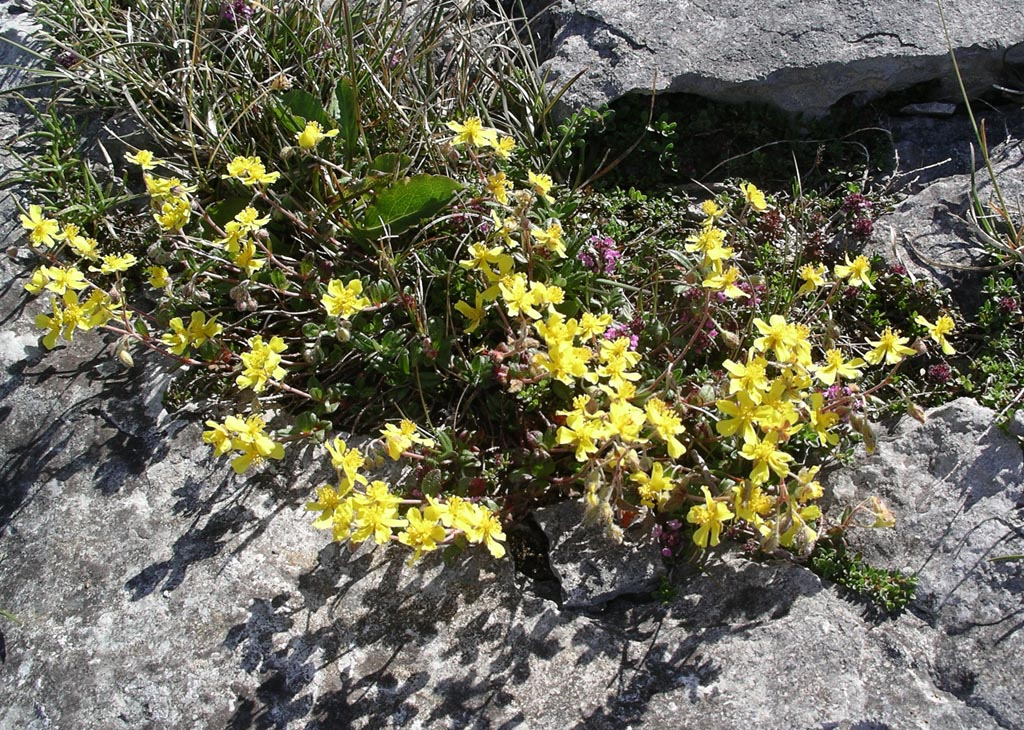
H. oelandicum plant on The Burren, Ireland

The plant typically has a central stock from which numerous branches radiate horizontally or ascending. Stipules are absent and the small leaves (about 10mm long) are simple and green above but densely hairy and grey below which is a distinguishing characteristic in areas where H. nummularium is also present.

The yellow flowers have 5 petals, free at the base and 5 sepals in cymes generally with 1 to 6 flowers in each cyme.

== Habitat ==
It is restricted to dry limestone rocky areas. In Britain it is always close to the sea but in mainland Europe its range is restricted to the calcareous upland ranges such as the Alps.

== Distribution ==
It occurs in several areas of Europe including France, Germany, Spain, Sweden and parts of north Africa and the eastern Mediterranean countries. In the British Isles it is very restricted in its distribution being limited to parts of the South Wales coastline and a few locations on Anglesey and the Great Orme.
