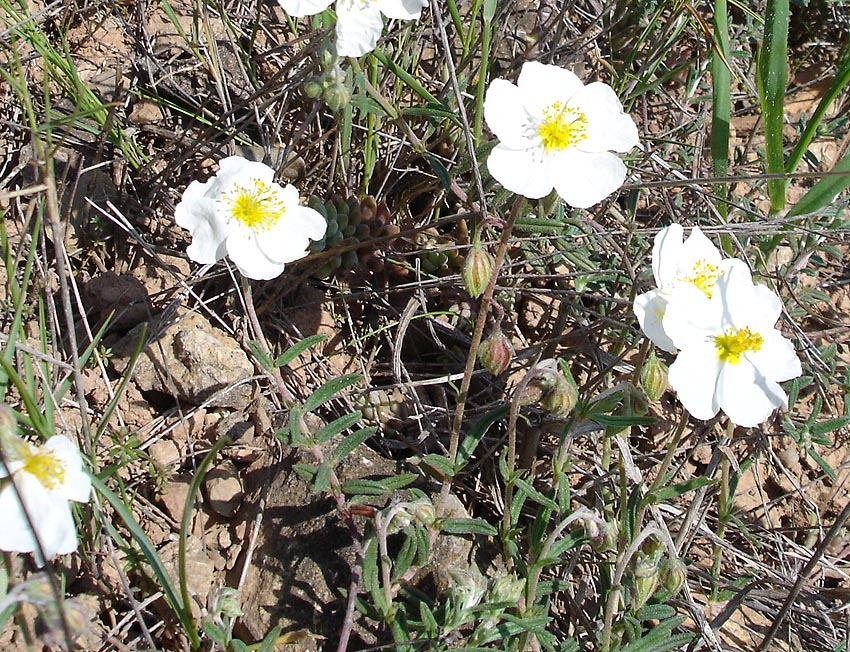

Scientific classification
- Kingdom: Plantae
- Clade: Embryophytes
- Clade: Tracheophytes
- Clade: Spermatophytes
- Clade: Angiosperms
- Clade: Eudicots
- Clade: Rosids
- Order: Malvales
- Family: Cistaceae
- Genus: Helianthemum
- Species: H. apenninum

Binomial name
- Helianthemum apenninum (L.) Mill.

= Helianthemum apenninum =

Species of flowering plant

Helianthemum apenninum, the white rock-rose, is a white-flowering rock rose of the family Cistaceae found in the North Atlantic region, mainly in dry grassy and rocky places across large parts of Europe.

Helianthemum apenninum, is a self supporting, semi-woody shrub that may grow up to 0.5 meters (1 ft 8 in) high and roots 0.3 meters (1 ft 0 in) deep. It follows a perennial life cycle.

It flowers from March to July and produces pentamerous flowers, white with yellow centers and yellow stamens and up to 30 mm across. The three outer sepals are hairy and striped; the 2 inner sepals are very small. The flowers grow in clusters of 3 to 10 on a stem. The flowers are visited by Marsh Marygold Moth (Micropterix calthella).

It produces Dry fruits with seeds (average 0.9 mg) that are dispersed through autochory (un-assisted or gravity-assisted dispersion).

It is photoautotroph and an Evergreen Plant (maintains foliage throughout the year). The leaves are small (around 30 mm), linear/lance-shaped, in opposite pairs. They are covered with greyish or whitish hairs, especially on the underside, and the edges are rolled under.
