= Frère Sennen =

French botanist (1861–1937)

Étienne Marcellin Granié-Blanc
- Born: 13 July 1861; Coupiac, Aveyron
- Died: 16 January 1937 (aged 75); Marseille
- Other names: Frère Sennen (religious)
- Awards: Chevalier de la Légion d'honneur
- Scientific career
- Fields: Botany
- Author abbrev. (botany): Sennen

Étienne Marcellin Granié-Blanc, religious name Frère Sennen (1861–1937), was a French botanist and member (Brother) of the Catholic order Frères des écoles chrétiennes. He collected plants in France, Spain, and Morocco.

== Biography ==
Based for many years at the École Chrétiennes de Beziers in southern France, Frère Sennen collected a vast number of botanical specimens in the Languedoc. He published work on the flora of Beziers with Abbé Hippolyte-Jacques Coste (1858–1924). In 1894 Sennen was elected a member of the Société botanique de France. In 1904 he was appointed director of the Christian Brothers school in Figueres, Catalonia. He collected plants in the region of Ampurdan in Spain and then extended his studies to all Spain. In the early 1930s he collected plants in Morocco, especially near Melilla.

At the Instituto Botánico de Barcelona, one of the main preserved historical herbaria is that of Frère Sennen. He distributed more than 400,000 botanical specimens to the main European institutions of his time. The 10,309 specimens of the thirty series that constitute his exsiccata resp. exsiccata series "Plantes d'Espagne" were prepared and published between 1907 and 1936. The Sennen herbarium contains about eighty-five specimens. Barcelona's Colegio La Salle Bonanova contains a herbarium with about 40,000 specimens collected by Sennen.

When the Spanish Revolution of 1936 began, he left Spain and settled in Marseille, dying there suddenly in January 1937.

Frère Sennen was the vice-president of the Société botanique de France, the president of the Sociedad Ibérica de Ciencias Naturales, a corresponding member of the Royal Academy of Sciences and Arts of Barcelona, and an honorary member of the Institució Catalana de Ciències Naturals.

== See also ==
- Abdon and Sennen

== Selected publications ==
- 1894. Fr. Sennén et abbé H. Coste : Plantes adventices observées dans la vallée de l’Orb à Bédarieux et à Hérépian. Bulletin de la Société Botanique de France (BSBF), XLI, p. 98-113.
- 1900. Comptes rendus des recherches botaniques faites par les Frères des Ecoles chrétiennes de La Nouvelle (Aude).BSBF, XLVII, p. 424-146.
- 1902. Sennen, Frère (2014). "Herborisations Aux Environs De La Nouvelle (Aude), suite". Bulletin de la Société Botanique de France. 49 (5): 364–377. doi:10.1080/00378941.1902.10830955. ISSN 0037-8941.
- 1910. Une nouvelle fougère pour l'Europe. Ed. Impr. de Monnoyer
- 1912. Note sur la flore de l’Empordà. Bol.Soc. aragon. d. C. nat., 33 pages; hommage à Linné.
- 1914. Plantes d’Espagne. Diagnoses et commentaires des années 1912 et 1913. Bull. de Géograph. Bot., p. 220-252
- 1917. Flore de Catalogne. Additions et commentaires. Barcelone, 212 pages; extr. Bull. Inst. Catal. D’Hist. Nat.
- 1918. Catalogo del herbario barcelonès. Barcelona, 1918. In-8°, XXIV-71 pages.
- 1925. Sennen, Le Frére (1925). "La garrigue du littoral, depuis Montpellier jusqu'à Sagunto". Bulletin de la Société Botanique de France. 72: 92–114. doi:10.1080/00378941.1925.10832718.
- 1926. Sennen, le Frère (1926). "Nos découvertes en Cerdagne". Bulletin de la Société Botanique de France. 73 (4): 641–680. doi:10.1080/00378941.1926.10833624. ISSN 0037-8941.
- 1926. Plantes d’Espagne. Diagnoses et commentaires. Zaragoza. impr. Canfranc, 274 pages; extr.du Bol. Soc. Iber. de C. nat., années 1917 à 1924.
- 1928. Plantes d’Espagne. Bol. Soc Iber. de C. nat., XXVII, n°6-12 et XXVIII, n° 1-4, Zaragoza, 1928-1929
- 1928-1930. La Flore de Tibidabo. In: Le Monde des Plantes, XI-XII, 1928, mai-juin, p. 4, 1928; I-II, 1929;1930, n°183, p. 14-16 et n° 184, p. 23-24.
- 1929. "La flore du Tibidabo". Monde des Plantes, mai 1928-avril 1929. Imprimerie moderne, M. Ch. Duffour ed. (Agent)
- 1931. La flore du Tibidabo. Œuvres du Musée des Sciences Naturelles de Barcelone, XV. Barcelone * 1931. Campagne botanique au Maroc, Ed. Impr. de Brulliard
- 1930-1936. Plantes d’Espagne. Diagnoses et commentaires, 2eme partie, Bol. Soc. Iber. de C. nat., separata de 257 pages.
- 1933. Catalogo de la flora del Rif Oriental y principalmente de las cabilas limitrofes con Melilla. Melilla, impr. EC., 120 pages.
- 1935. Plantes d'Espagne. Barcelone, 1906-1935, environ 10 000 étiquettes.
- 1936. Campagnes botaniques au Maroc Oriental de 1930 à 1935, des Frères Sennén et Mauricio. Madrid, 160 pages.
