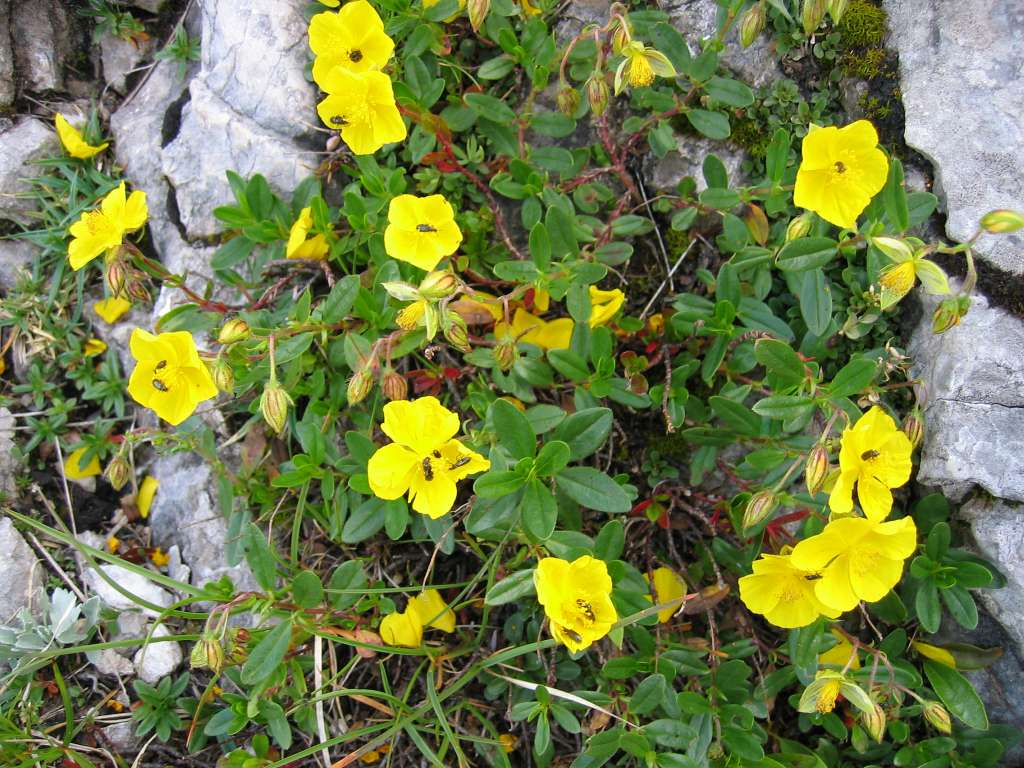
- Helianthemum nummularium subsp. glabrum

Scientific classification
- Kingdom: Plantae
- Clade: Tracheophytes
- Clade: Angiosperms
- Clade: Eudicots
- Clade: Rosids
- Order: Malvales
- Family: Cistaceae
- Genus: Helianthemum
- Species: H. nummularium

Binomial name
- Helianthemum nummularium (L.) Mill.

Synonyms
- List: Cistus mutabilis Jacq.; Cistus nummularius L.; Cistus roseus All.; Cistus serpillifolius L.; Cistus surrejanus L.; Helianthemum angustipetalum Cadevall; Helianthemum arcticum (Grosser) Janch.; Helianthemum barbatum Sweet; Helianthemum chamaecistus Mill.; Helianthemum croceum Ten.; Helianthemum graecum Boiss. & Heldr.; Helianthemum helianthemum H.Karst.; Helianthemum heterophyllum Schur; Helianthemum laevigatum Schur; Helianthemum macranthum Schur; Helianthemum multiflorum Ziz; Helianthemum mutabile (Jacq.) Moench; Helianthemum rupicola Schur; Helianthemum seguieri Pollini; Helianthemum serpillifolium (L.) Mill.; Helianthemum stabianum Heldr. ex Willk.; Helianthemum vulgare Garsault; Helianthemum vulgare Gaertn.

= Helianthemum nummularium =

Species of flowering plant

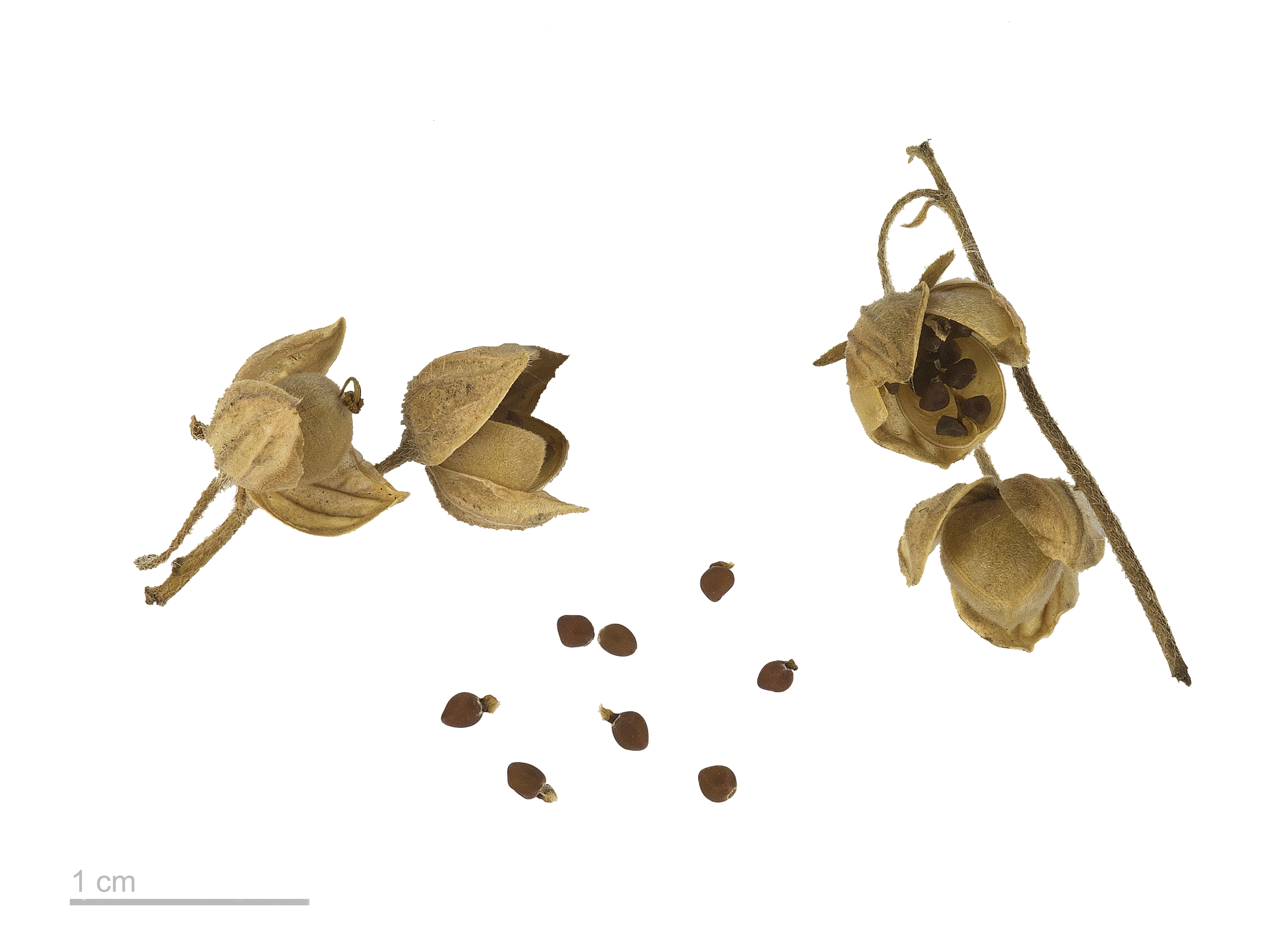
Helianthemum nummularium - MHNT

Helianthemum nummularium (known as common rock-rose) is a species of rock-rose (Cistaceae), native to most of Europe.

== Description ==
It is an evergreen trailing plant with loose terminal clusters of bright yellow, saucer-shaped flowers. In the flower centre is a tight cluster of orange stamens, which are sensitive to the touch, and spread outwards to reveal the tall stigma in the middle. The plant is common on chalk downs, and occasional in other grasslands, always on dry, base-rich soil. The wild species has yellow flowers, but garden varieties range from white through yellow to deep red.

Though the individual blooms are short-lived, the plant produces a mass of flowers through the summer. It needs a dry, sunny place, like a south-facing rockery or meadow. As the Latin name Helianthemum suggests, these are sun-flowers. This is a good pollen source for bees and there are several species of small beetle that feed on the foliage. Common rock-rose is also the food plant for the larvae of several species of moth and butterfly such as the silver-studded blue (Plebejus argus).

It flowers from May until July.

== Taxonomy ==
=== Subspecies ===
Two subspecies are currently accepted:

- Helianthemum nummularium subsp. kerneri (Gottl.-Tann. & Janch.) Lambinon
- Helianthemum nummularium subsp. nummularium. Widespread.

=== Gallery ===
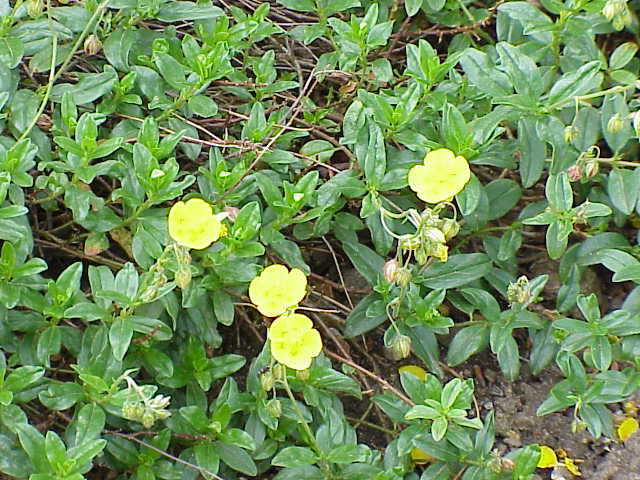

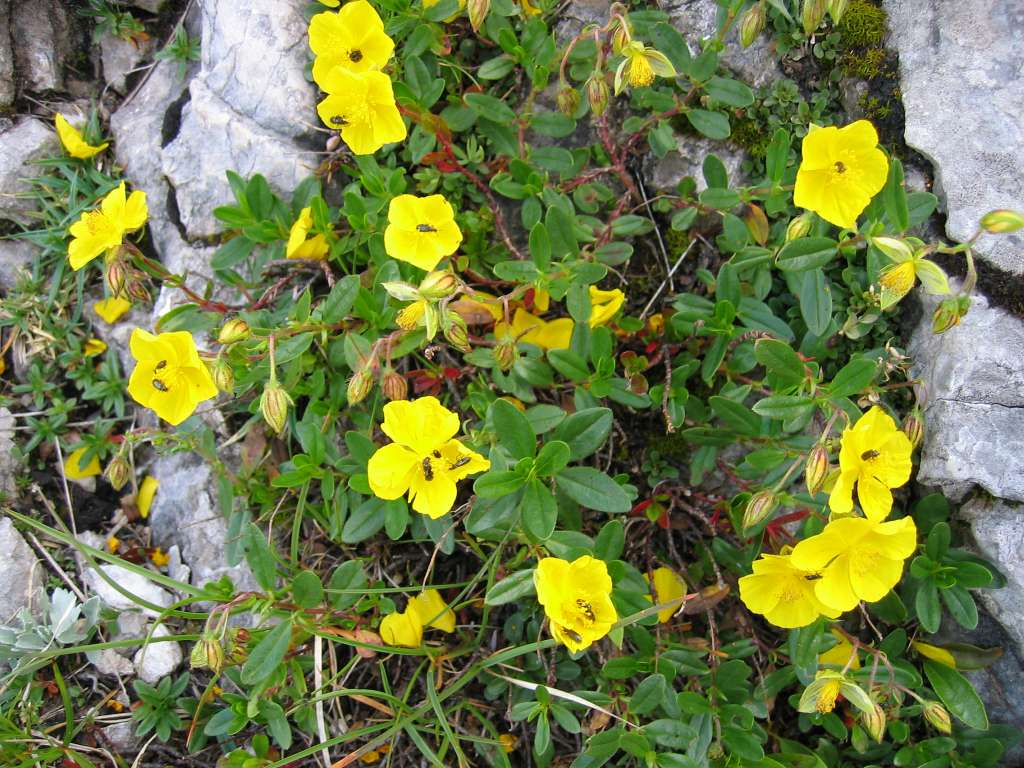

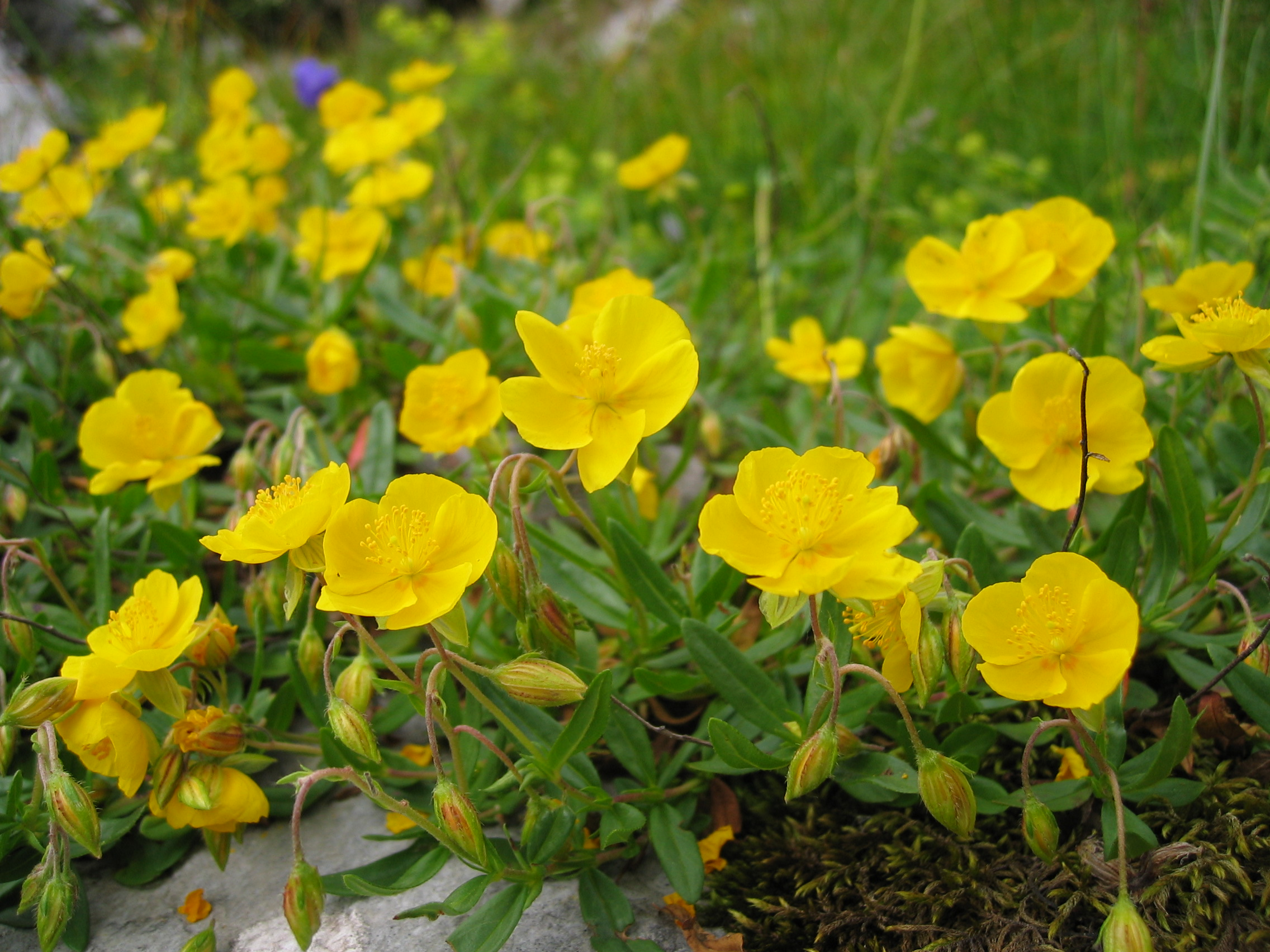

=== subsp. grandiflorum (Scop.) Schinz & Thell. ===
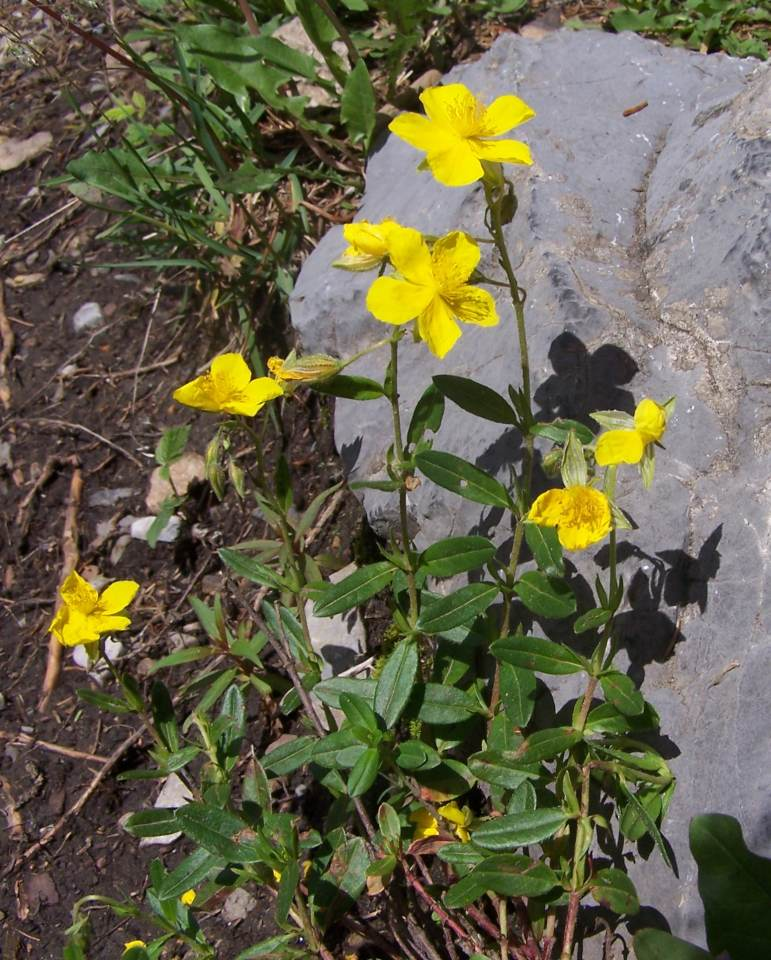

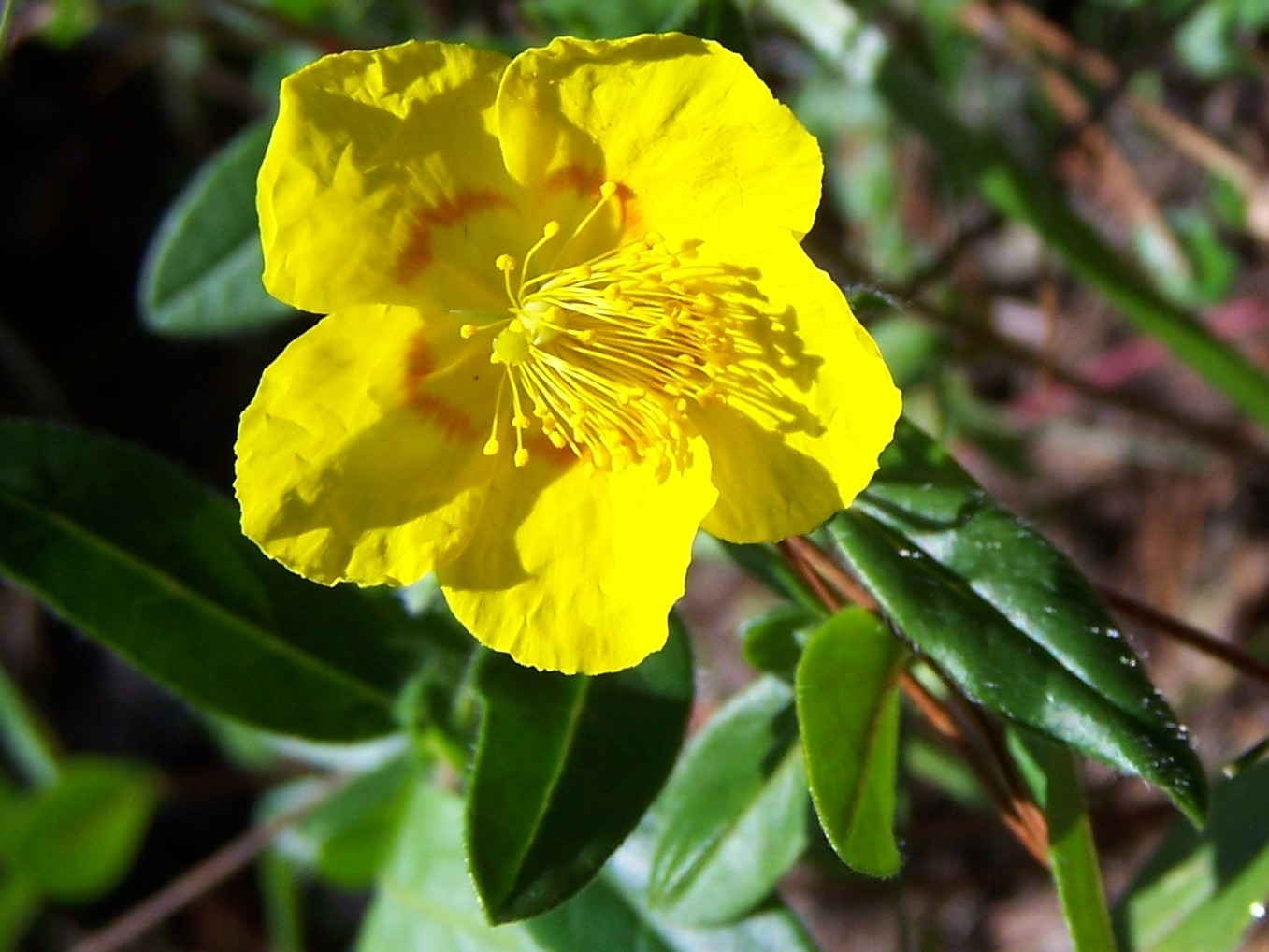

=== subsp. nummularium ===
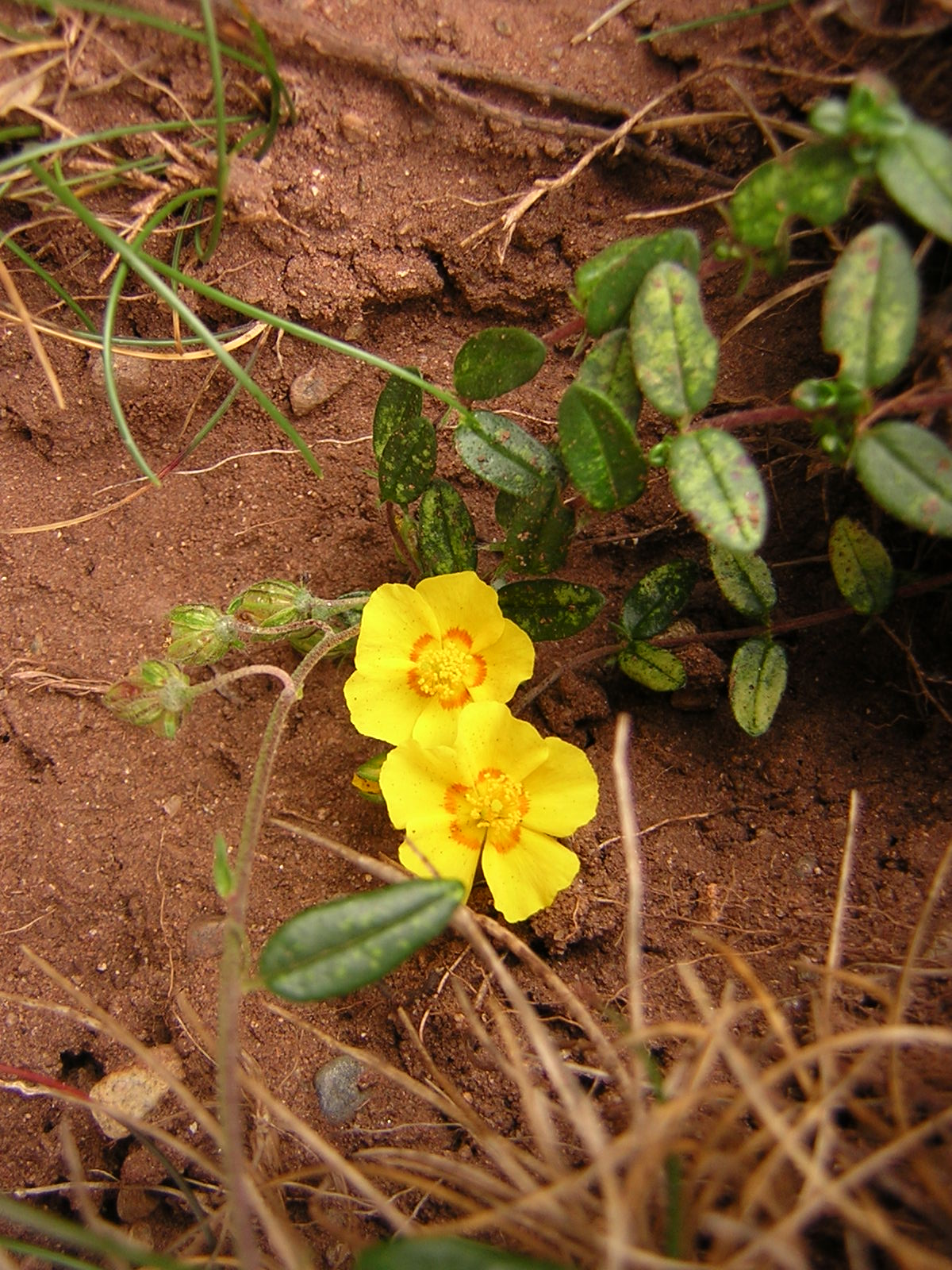

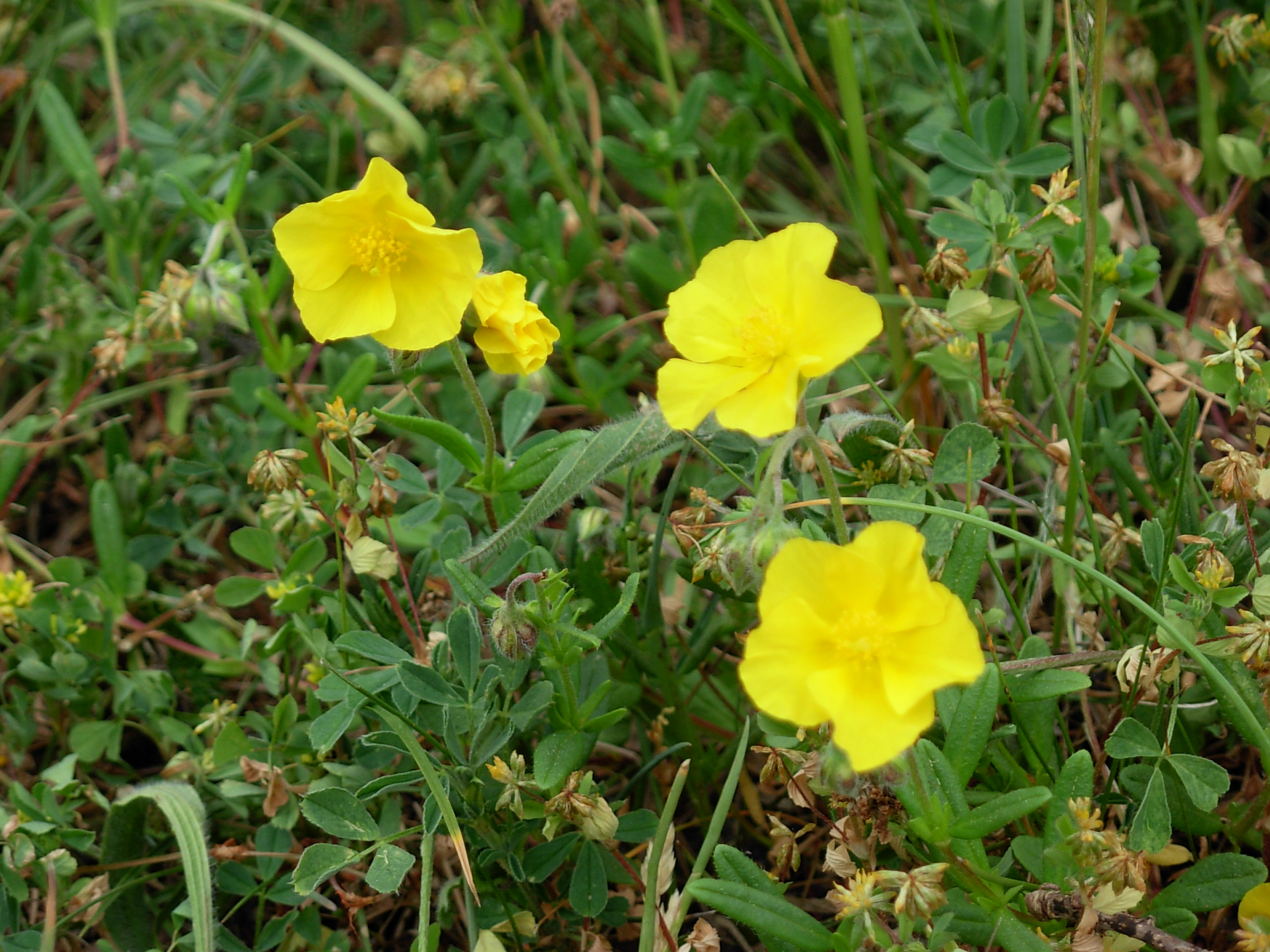

=== subsp. obscurum (Čelak.) Holub) ===
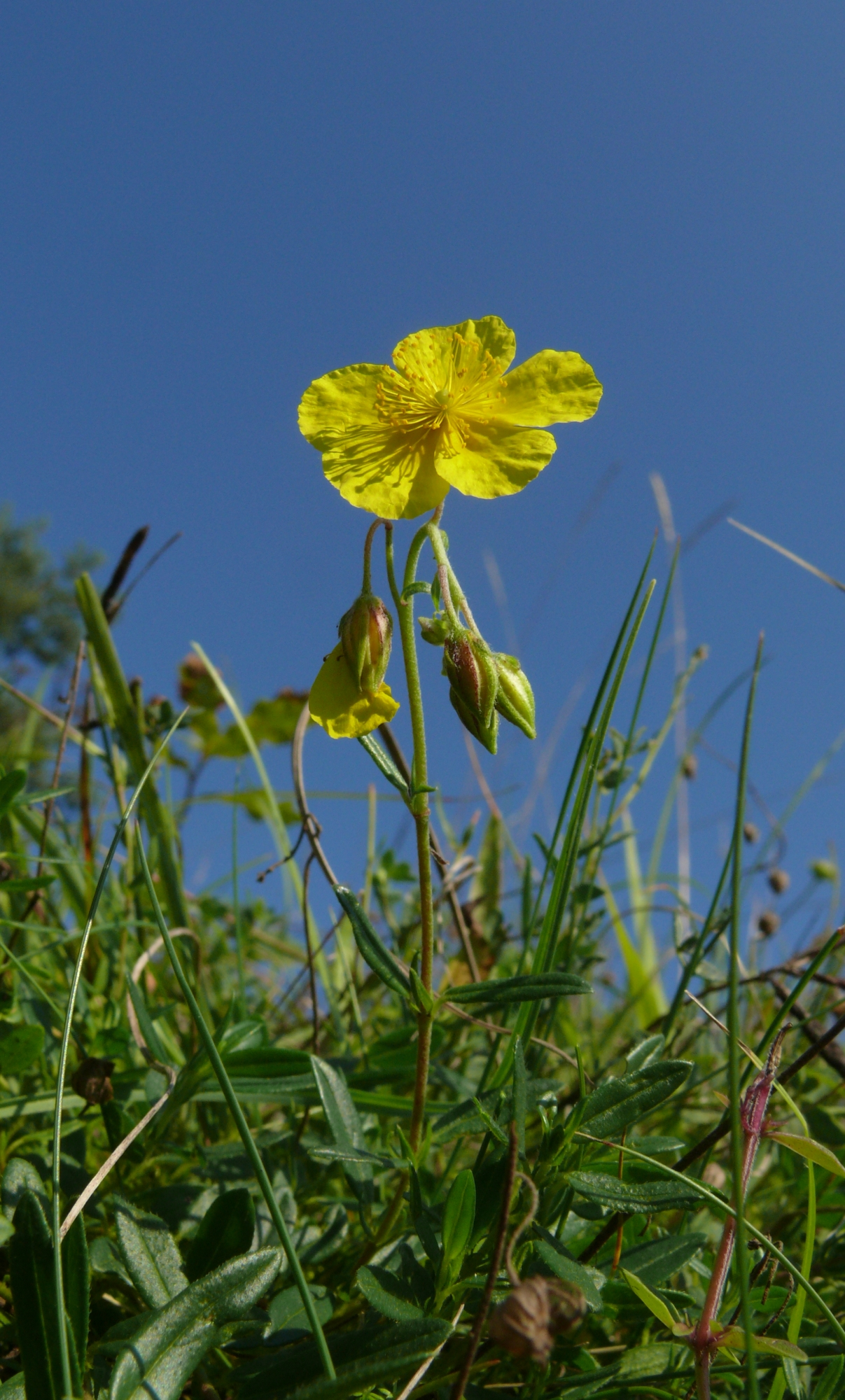
H. nummularium subsp. obscurum
Germany - Schwäbisch Fränkische Waldberge

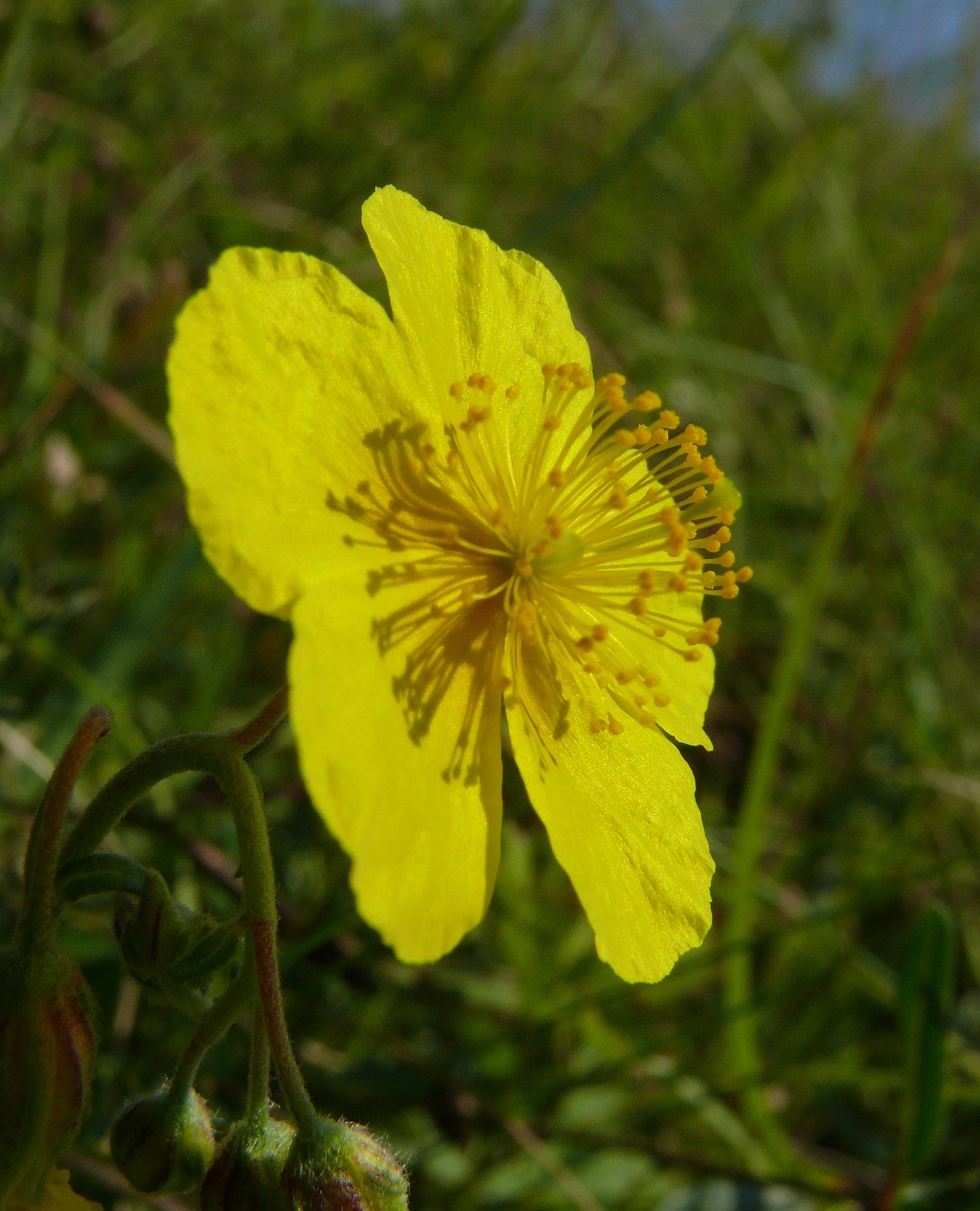
H. nummularium subsp. obscurum
Germany - Schwäbisch Fränkische Waldberge

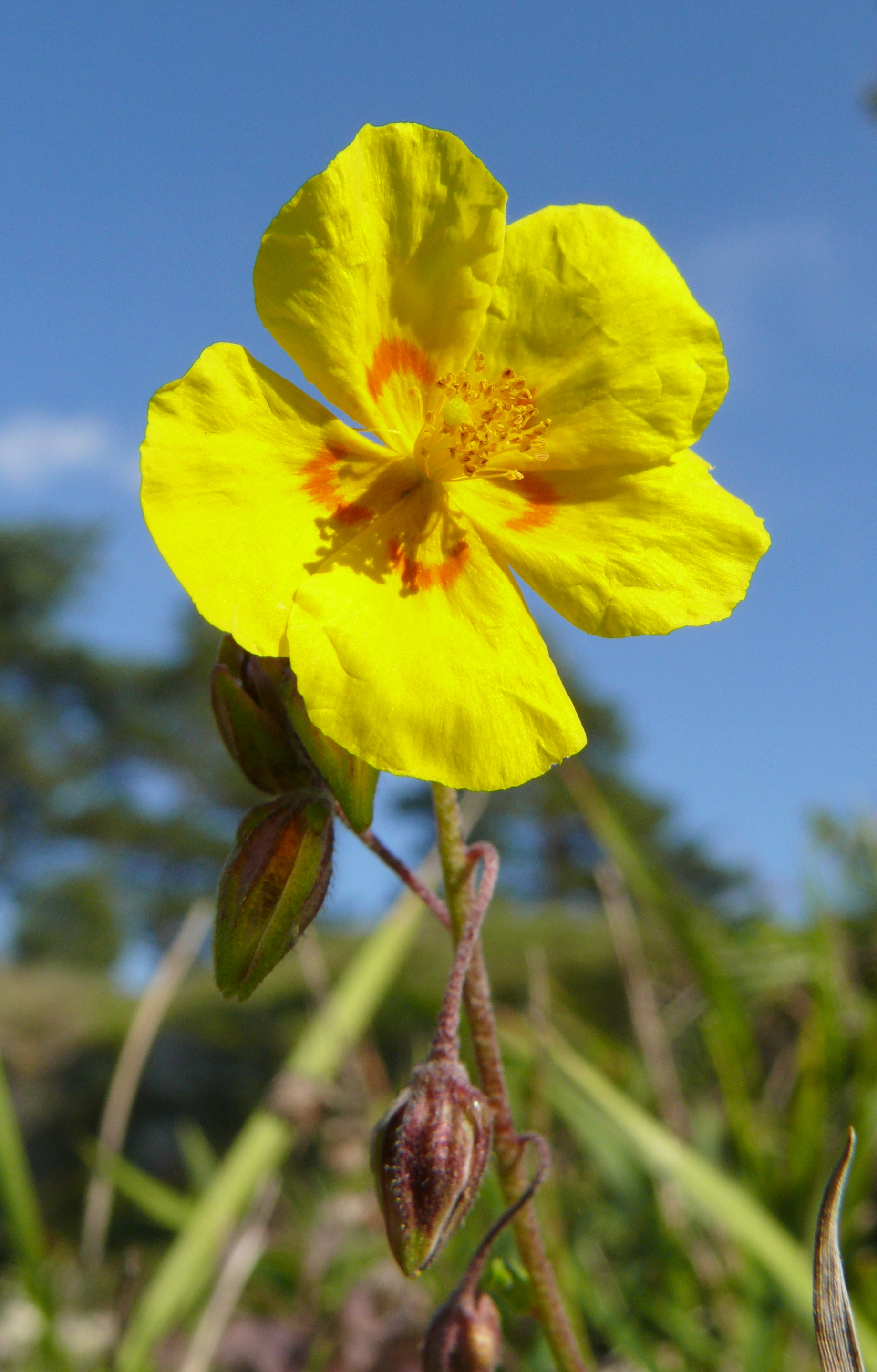
H. nummularium subsp. obscurum
Germany - Schwäbische Alb

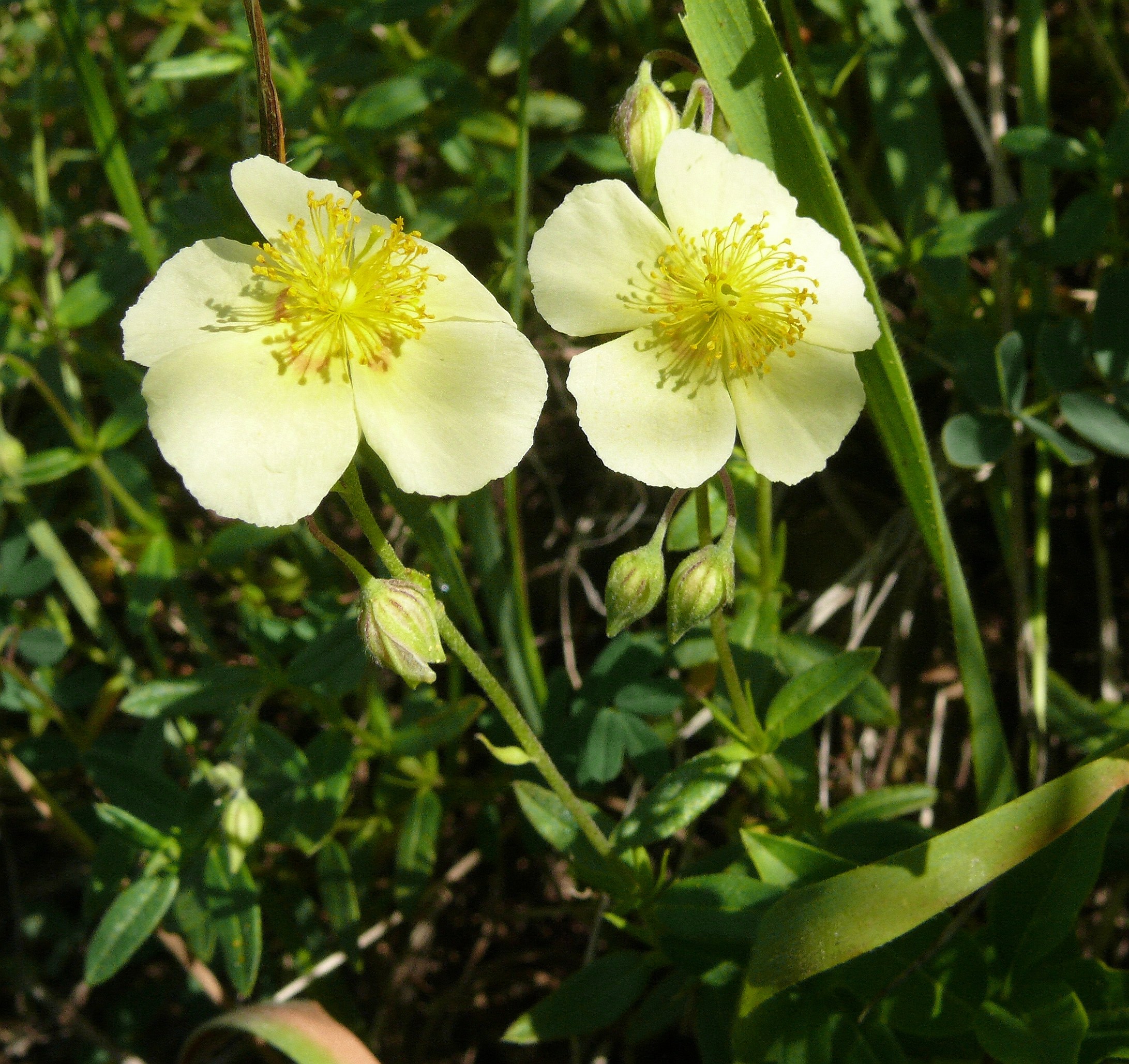
H. nummularium subsp. obscurum
Germany - Schwäbische Alb

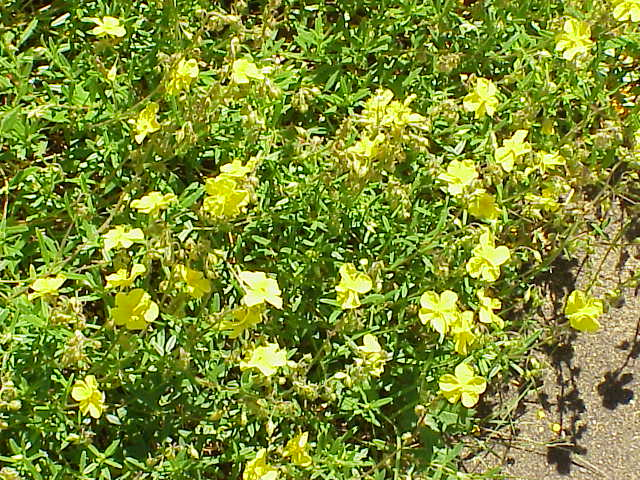

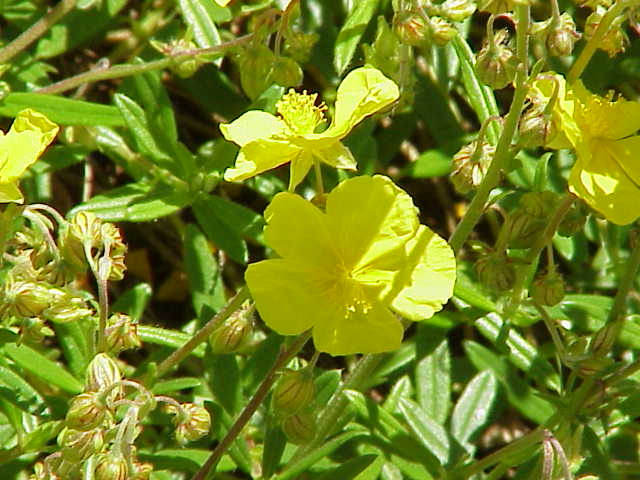

=== Pink-flowered cultivars ===
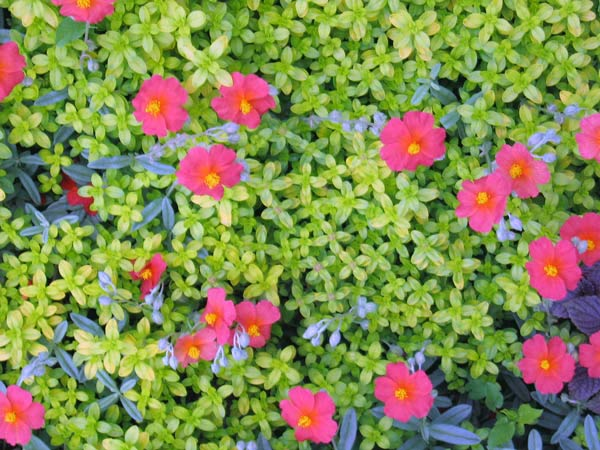

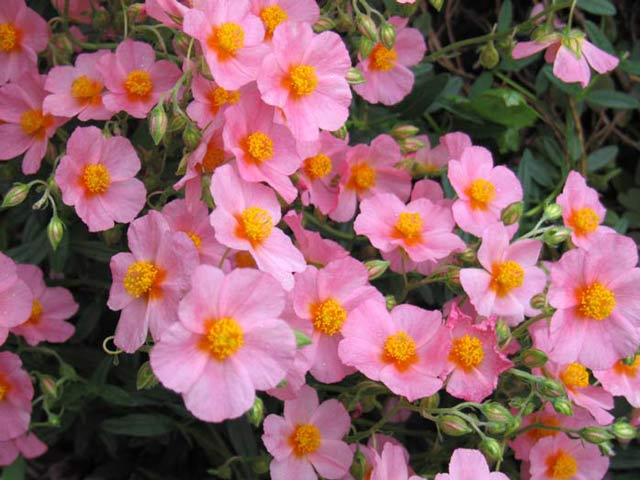

=== Illustrations ===
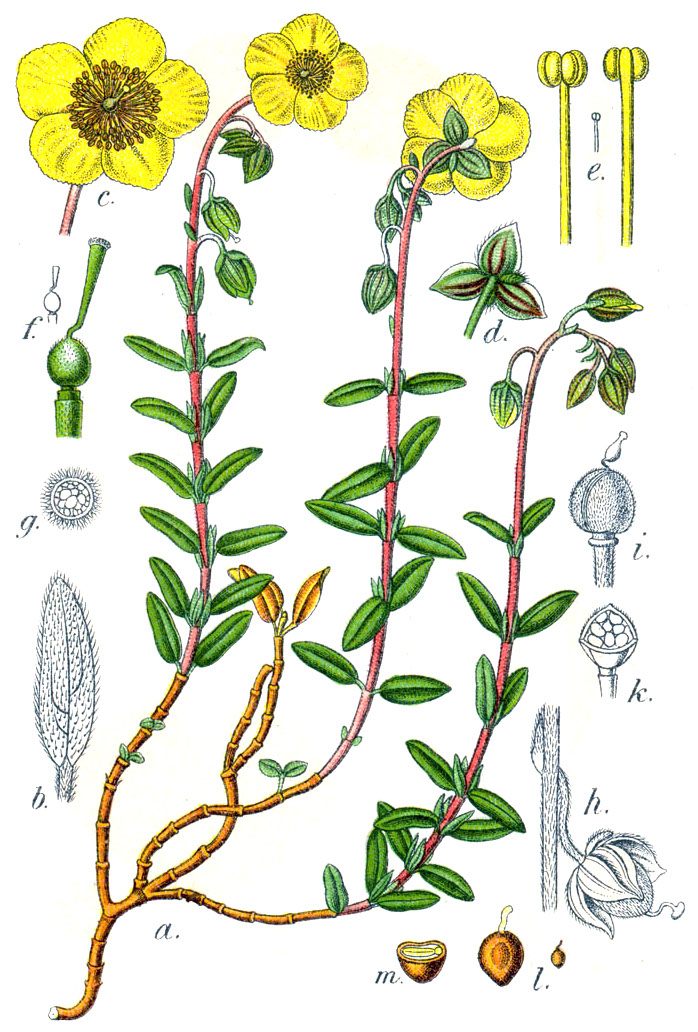

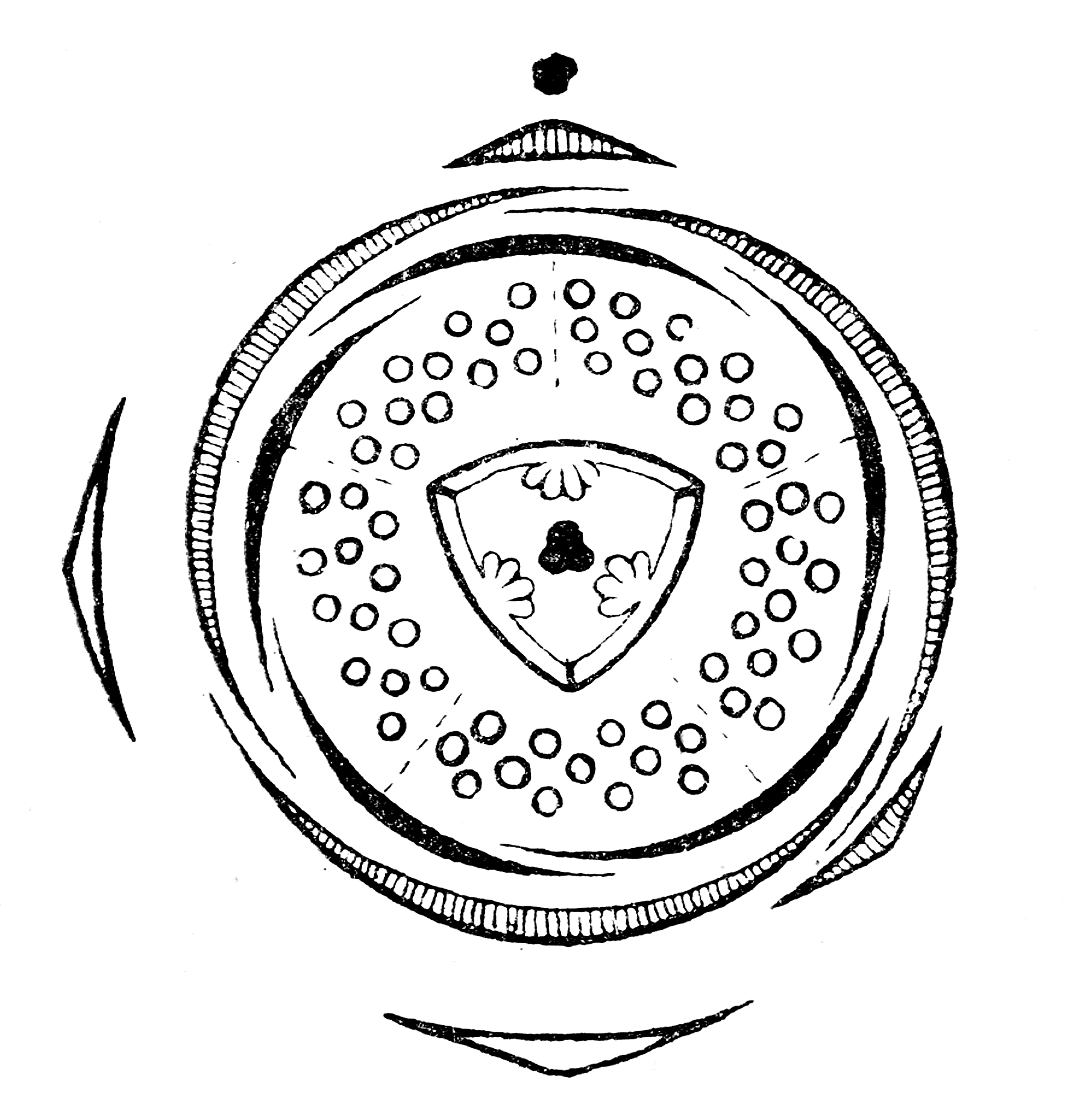
Flower diagram

=== Unclassified images of Helianthemum nummularium ===
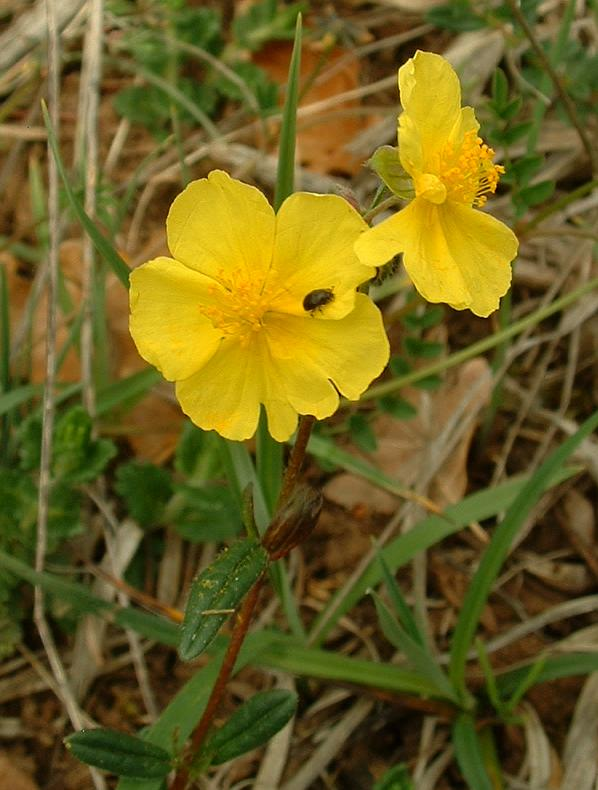

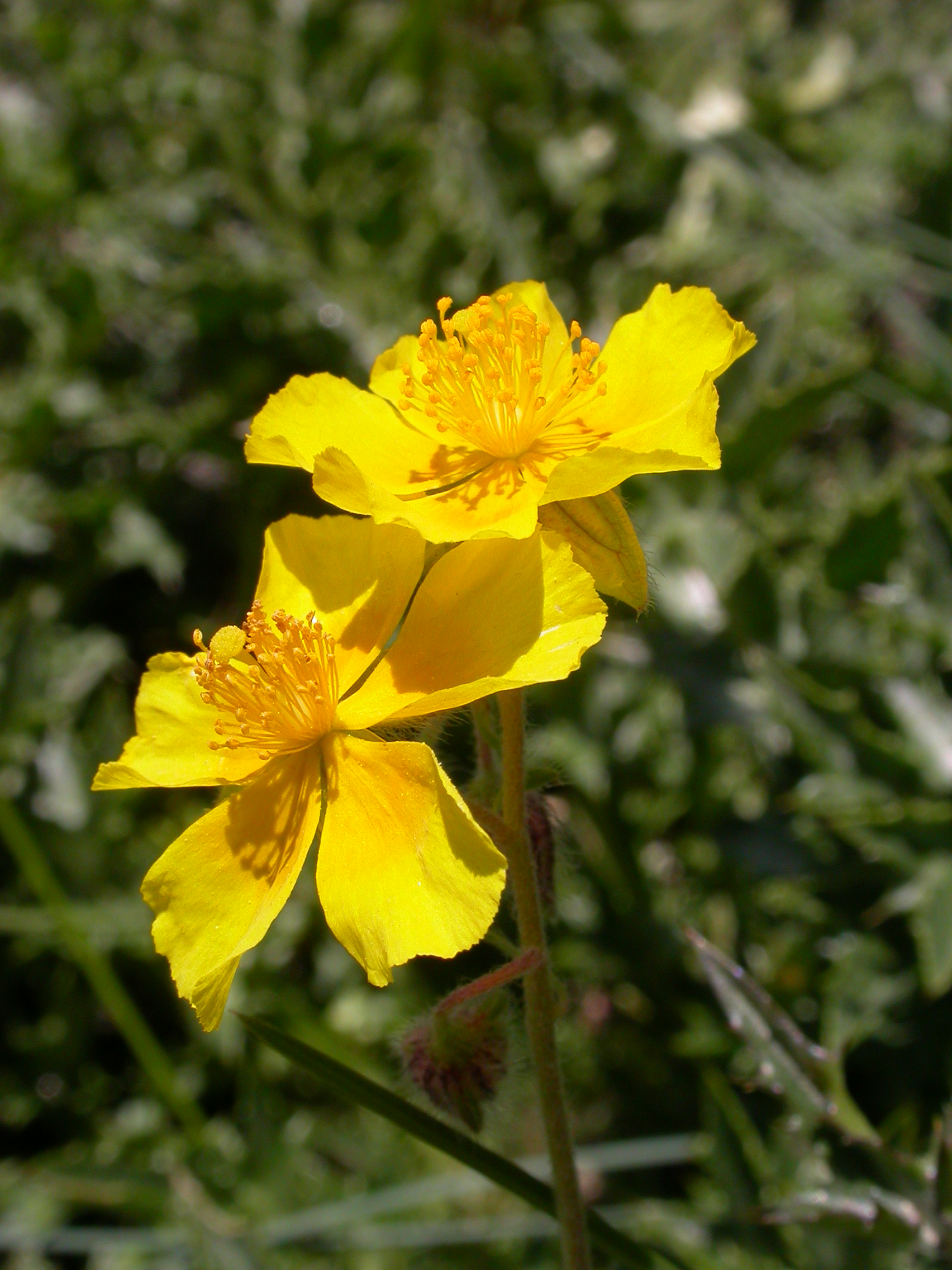

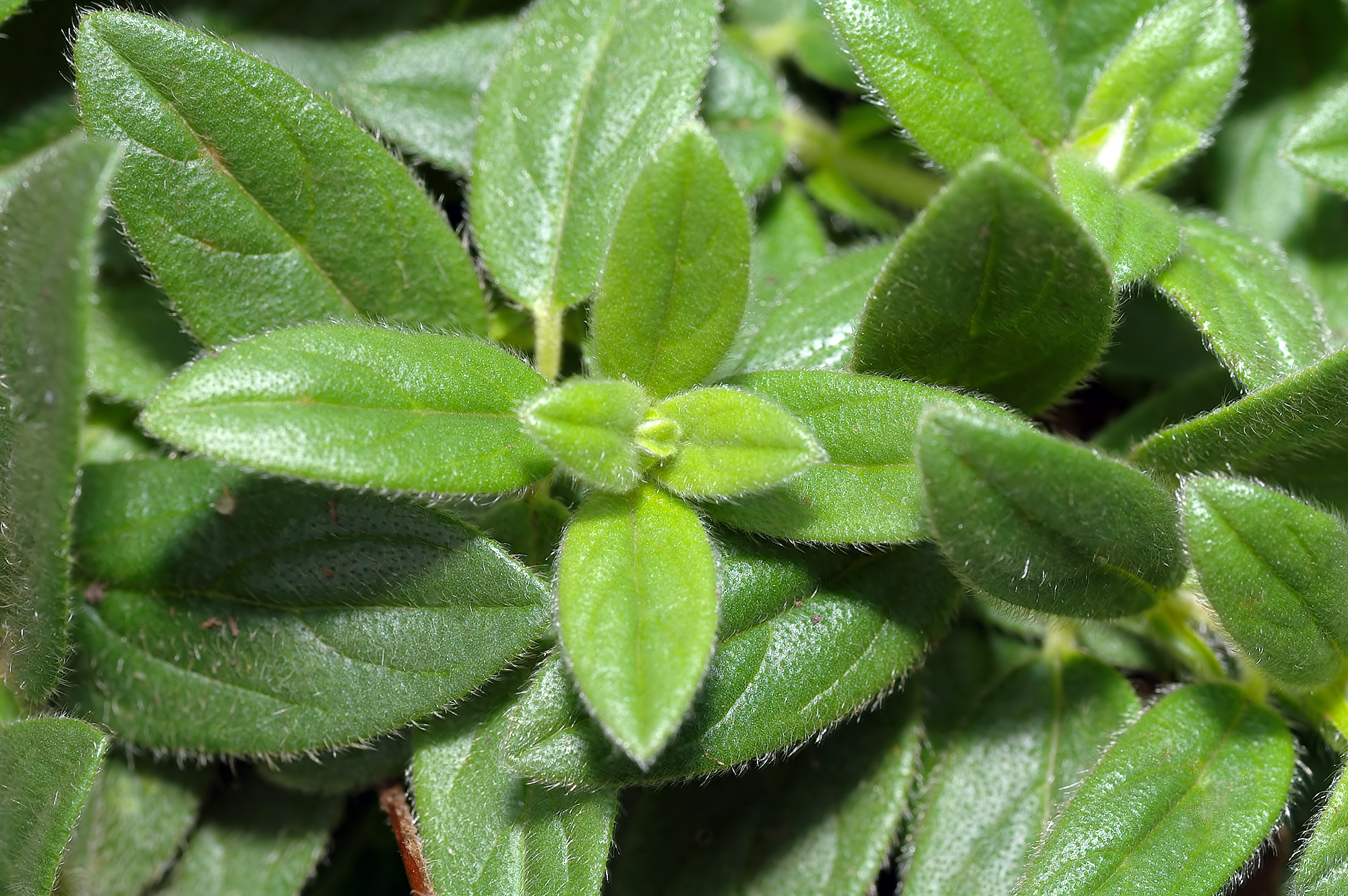
