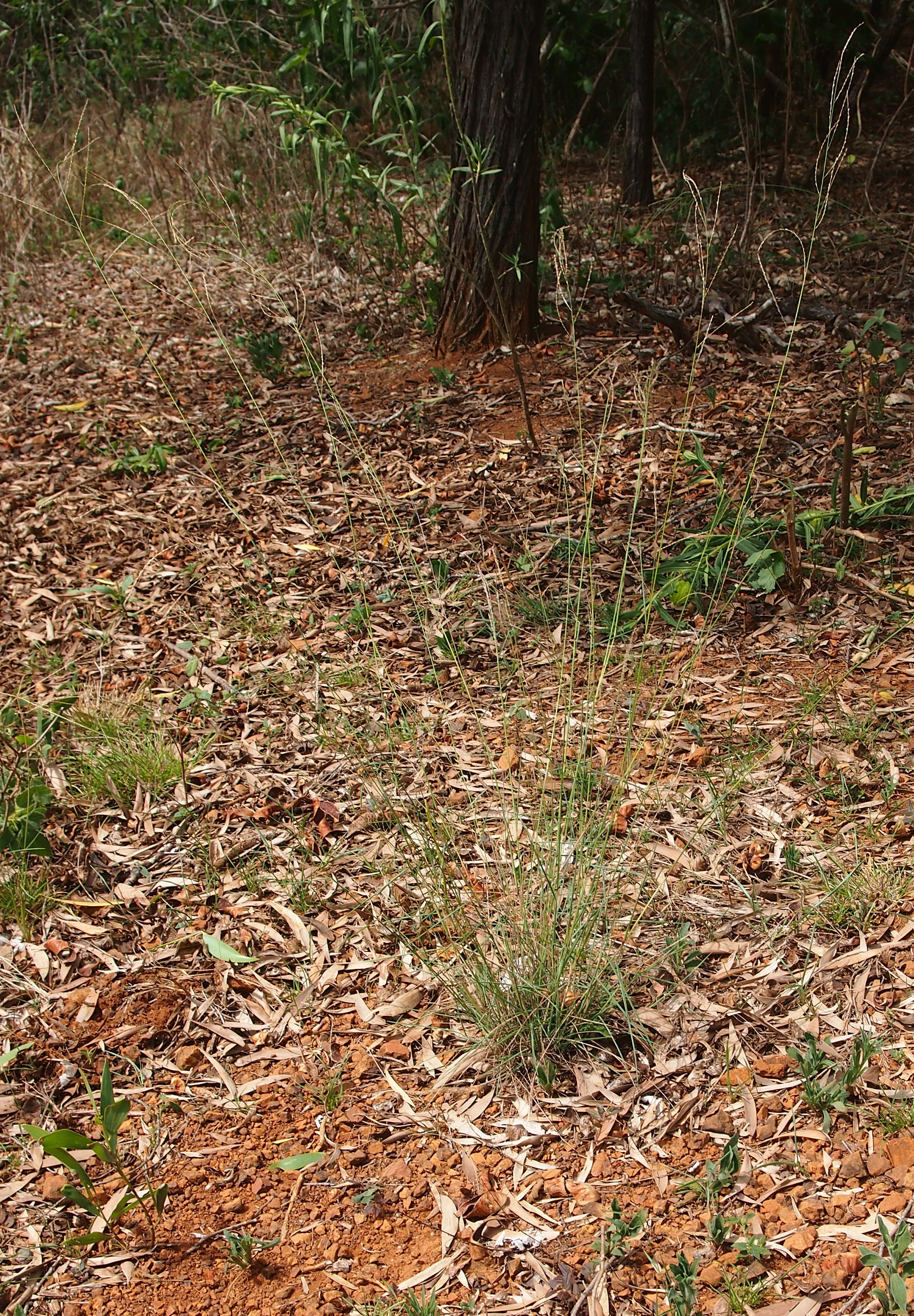
- Leptochloa digitata

Scientific classification
- Kingdom: Plantae
- Clade: Tracheophytes
- Clade: Angiosperms
- Clade: Monocots
- Clade: Commelinids
- Order: Poales
- Family: Poaceae
- Subfamily: Chloridoideae
- Tribe: Cynodonteae
- Subtribe: Eleusininae
- Genus: Leptochloa; P.Beauv.

Type species
- Leptochloa virgata (L.) P.Beauv.

Synonyms
- Baldomiria Herter; Chloropsis Kuntze; Diachroa Nutt.; Diacisperma Kuntze, nom. superfl.; Leptochloris Munro ex Kuntze, not validly publ.; Leptostachys G.Mey., nom. superfl.; Oxydenia Nutt.; Rabdochloa P.Beauv.; Trichloris E.Fourn. ex Benth.

= Leptochloa =

Sprangletops

Genus of grasses

Leptochloa is a widespread genus of Asian, Australian, and American plants in the grass family.

Members of the genus are commonly known as sprangletops.

The generic name is derived from the Greek words leptos, meaning "thin," and chloa, meaning "grass," referring to the inflorescences.

== Species ==
As of October 2024, Plants of the World Online accepted 14 species:

- Leptochloa anisopoda (B.L.Rob.) P.M.Peterson
- Leptochloa asthenes (Roem. & Schult.) C.E.Hubb. – Australia
- Leptochloa barbata (Desv.) Nicora – Paraguay, Argentina
- Leptochloa chloridiformis (Hack.) Parodi
- Leptochloa crinita (Lag.) P.M.Peterson & N.Snow
- Leptochloa digitata (R.Br.) Domin – Australia
- Leptochloa exilis (Renvoize) P.M.Peterson
- Leptochloa longa Griseb. – Panama, Trinidad
- Leptochloa malayana (C.E.Hubb.) Jansen ex Veldkamp – Thailand, Borneo, Malaysia
- Leptochloa monticola Chase – Hispaniola
- Leptochloa mucronata (Michx.) Kunth – south-central USA, Mesoamerica, Bermuda, Trinidad, Netherlands Antilles, Bolivia, Ecuador, Peru, Galápagos
- Leptochloa pluriflora (E.Fourn.) P.M.Peterson & N.Snow
- Leptochloa tectoneticola (Backer) Jansen ex Veldkamp – Cambodia, Thailand, Java
- Leptochloa virgata (L.) P.Beauv. – tropic sprangletop – from South Carolina to Paraguay

=== Former species ===
Species formerly placed in Leptochloa include:
(See Arundinella Acrachne Bouteloua Chloris Coelachyrum Cynodon Desmostachya Dinebra Diplachne Disakisperma Eleusine Enteropogon Eragrostis Gouinia Gymnopogon Leptocarydion Myriostachya Pogonarthria Rostraria Trichoneura Trigonochloa Tripogon.)

- Leptochloa acuminata - Diplachne fusca subsp. fascicularis
- Leptochloa albemarlensis - Trichoneura lindleyana
- Leptochloa appletonii - Coelachyrum yemenicum
- Leptochloa arabica - Dinebra retroflexa
- Leptochloa arenaria - Trichoneura mollis
- Leptochloa bipinnata - Desmostachya bipinnata
- Leptochloa brandegeei - Enteropogon brandegeei
- Leptochloa burchellii - Gymnopogon burchellii
- Leptochloa calycina - Dinebra retroflexa
- Leptochloa chinensis – Dinebra chinensis
- Leptochloa ciliata - Trichoneura ciliata
- Leptochloa contracta - Diplachne fusca
- Leptochloa coromandelina - Dinebra retroflexa
- Leptochloa cynosuroides - Chloris filiformis
- Leptochloa digitatiformis - Disakisperma dubium
- Leptochloa dubia - Disakisperma dubium
- Leptochloa eleusine - Disakisperma eleusine
- Leptochloa falcata - Pogonarthria squarrosa
- Leptochloa fascicularis - Diplachne fusca subsp. fascicularis
- Leptochloa fusca - Diplachne fusca
- Leptochloa gigantea - Diplachne gigantea
- Leptochloa ginae - Diplachne fusca
- Leptochloa gracilis - Trigonochloa uniflora
- Leptochloa grandiglumis - Trichoneura grandiglumis
- Leptochloa hirta - Bouteloua disticha
- Leptochloa hookeri - Trichoneura lindleyana
- Leptochloa imbricata - Diplachne fusca subsp. uninervia
- Leptochloa laurentii - Trigonochloa uniflora
- Leptochloa lindleyana - Trichoneura lindleyana
- Leptochloa loliiformis - Tripogon loliiformis
- Leptochloa longiglumis - Trichoneura mollis
- Leptochloa malabarica - Diplachne fusca
- Leptochloa maritima - Diplachne fusca subsp. fascicularis
- Leptochloa marlothii - Pogonarthria squarrosa
- Leptochloa marquisensis - Dinebra marquisensis
- Leptochloa mexicana - Gouinia mexicana
- Leptochloa mollis - Trichoneura mollis
- Leptochloa monostachya - Enteropogon monostachyos
- Leptochloa muelleri - Diplachne fusca subsp. muelleri
- Leptochloa neuroglossa - Diplachne fusca
- Leptochloa obtusiflora Hochst. - Disakisperma obtusiflorum
- Leptochloa obtusiflora Steud. - Disakisperma dubium
- Leptochloa palmeri - Gouinia virgata
- Leptochloa panicoides Wight ex Steud. not (J.Presl) Hitchc. - Arundinella leptochloa
- Leptochloa parviflora - Diplachne fusca
- Leptochloa patens - Disakisperma dubium
- Leptochloa pectinata - Eleusine indica
- Leptochloa phleoidea - Rostraria cristata
- Leptochloa plectostachya - Cynodon plectostachyus
- Leptochloa plumosa - Leptocarydion vulpiastrum
- Leptochloa pluriflora - Trichloris pluriflora
- Leptochloa polygama - Gouinia virgata
- Leptochloa polystachya - Diplachne fusca subsp. fascicularis
- Leptochloa pringlei - Disakisperma dubium
- Leptochloa racemosa - Acrachne racemosa
- Leptochloa rigida - Eragrostis sessilispica
- Leptochloa rupestris - Trigonochloa rupestris
- Leptochloa schimperiana - Acrachne racemosa
- Leptochloa setacea - Tripogon leptophyllus
- Leptochloa spicata - Tripogon spicatus
- Leptochloa tracyi - Diplachne fusca subsp. fascicularis
- Leptochloa uniflora - Trigonochloa uniflora
- Leptochloa uninervia - Diplachne fusca subsp. uninervia
- Leptochloa verticillata - Acrachne racemosa
- Leptochloa virletii - Diplachne fusca subsp. uninervia
- Leptochloa wightiana - Myriostachya wightiana
- Leptochloa xerophila - Dinebra xerophila
- Leptochloa yemensis - Disakisperma obtusiflorum
