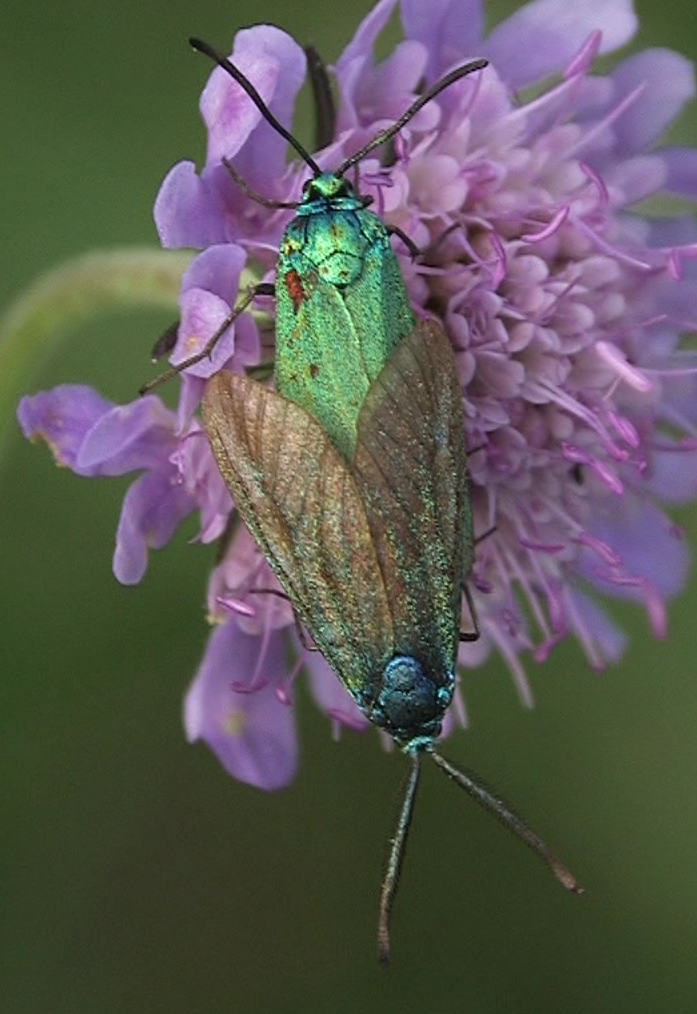

Scientific classification
- Kingdom: Animalia
- Phylum: Arthropoda
- Clade: Pancrustacea
- Class: Insecta
- Order: Lepidoptera
- Family: Zygaenidae
- Genus: Adscita
- Species: A. geryon

Binomial name
- Adscita geryon (Hübner, 1813)

Synonyms
- Sphinx geryon Hubner, 1813; Procris geryon; Adscita geryon chrysocephala Nickerl, 1845; Adscita geryon r. aeris Verity, 1946; Adscita geryon parisiensis Leraut, 2012

= Adscita geryon =

Cistus forester

Species of moth

Adscita geryon, the cistus forester, is a moth of the family Zygaenidae. It is found in southern and central Europe, east to Turkey. It is also present in Great Britain. It was first described by the German entomologist Jacob Hübner in 1813.

The wingspan is 20–25 mm. The larvae can be found from July to May of the following year.

== Subspecies ==
- Adscita geryon geryon (from the Iberian Peninsula and Britain to European Russia, the Crimea and Turkey)
- Adscita geryon acutafibra Verity, 1946
- Adscita geryon orientalis (Alberti, 1938)
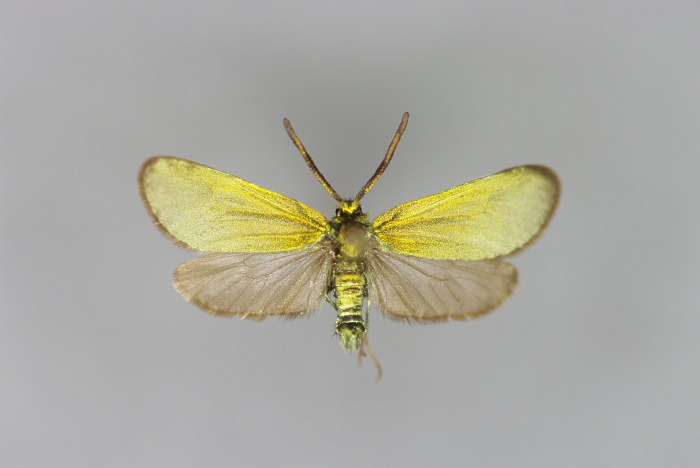
Specimen

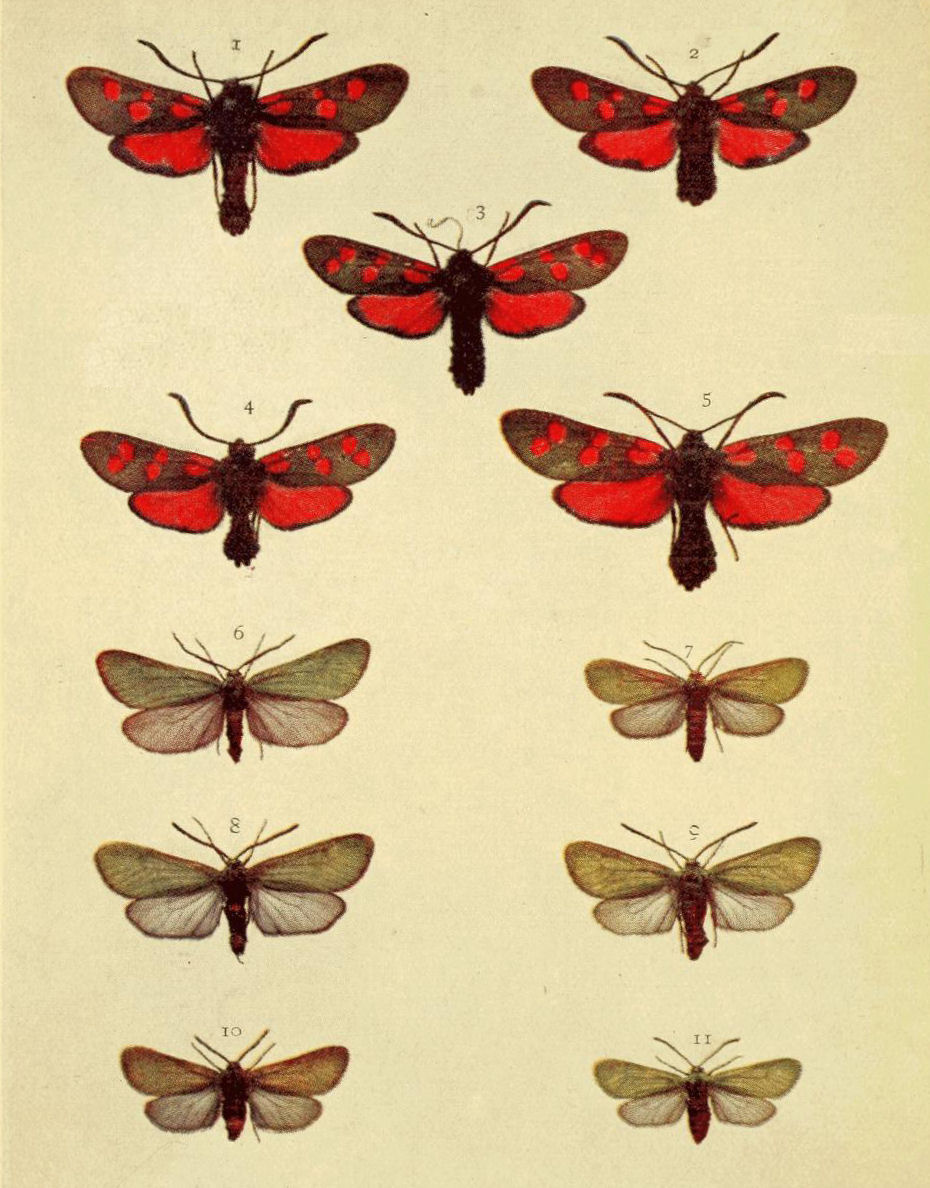
Illustration

Adscita geryon mating (video, 1m 55s)

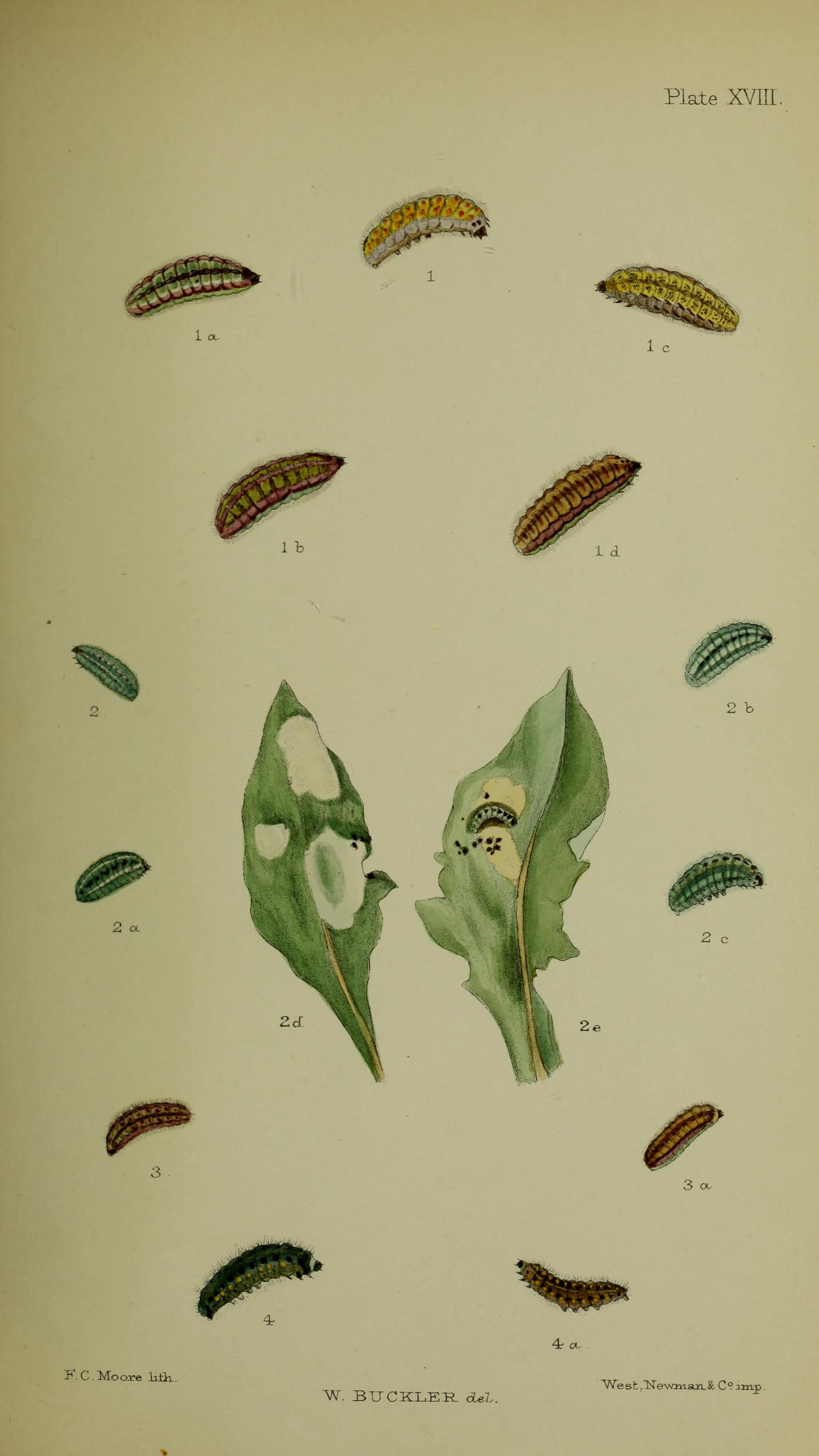
Figs. 3, 3a larvae after last moult

== Etymology ==
Adscita from adscitus, meaning adopted or enrolled was originally a Carl Linnaeus name. Linnaeus divided the hawk-moths into four groups, three of which he called the true hawk-moths and the fourth, ″a group of seven hangers-on, in default of a better position″. In 1783 Retzius was the first to use Adscita as a genus and he kept two of these moths in the Adscita, i.e. statices and filipendulae (the six-spot burnet, which was later assigned to Zygaena). Hubner gave the moth the specific name geryon, which refers to Geryon a mythical three-headed monster killed by Heracles.

== Bibliography ==
- Šašić, Martina; Nahirnić, Ana; Tarmann, Gerhard M. (2016-12-31). "Zygaenidae (Lepidoptera) in the Lepidoptera collections of the Croatian Natural History Museum". Natura Croatica: Periodicum Musei Historiae Naturalis Croatici. 25 (2): 233–248. doi:10.20302/NC.2016.25.19. eISSN 1848-7386.
