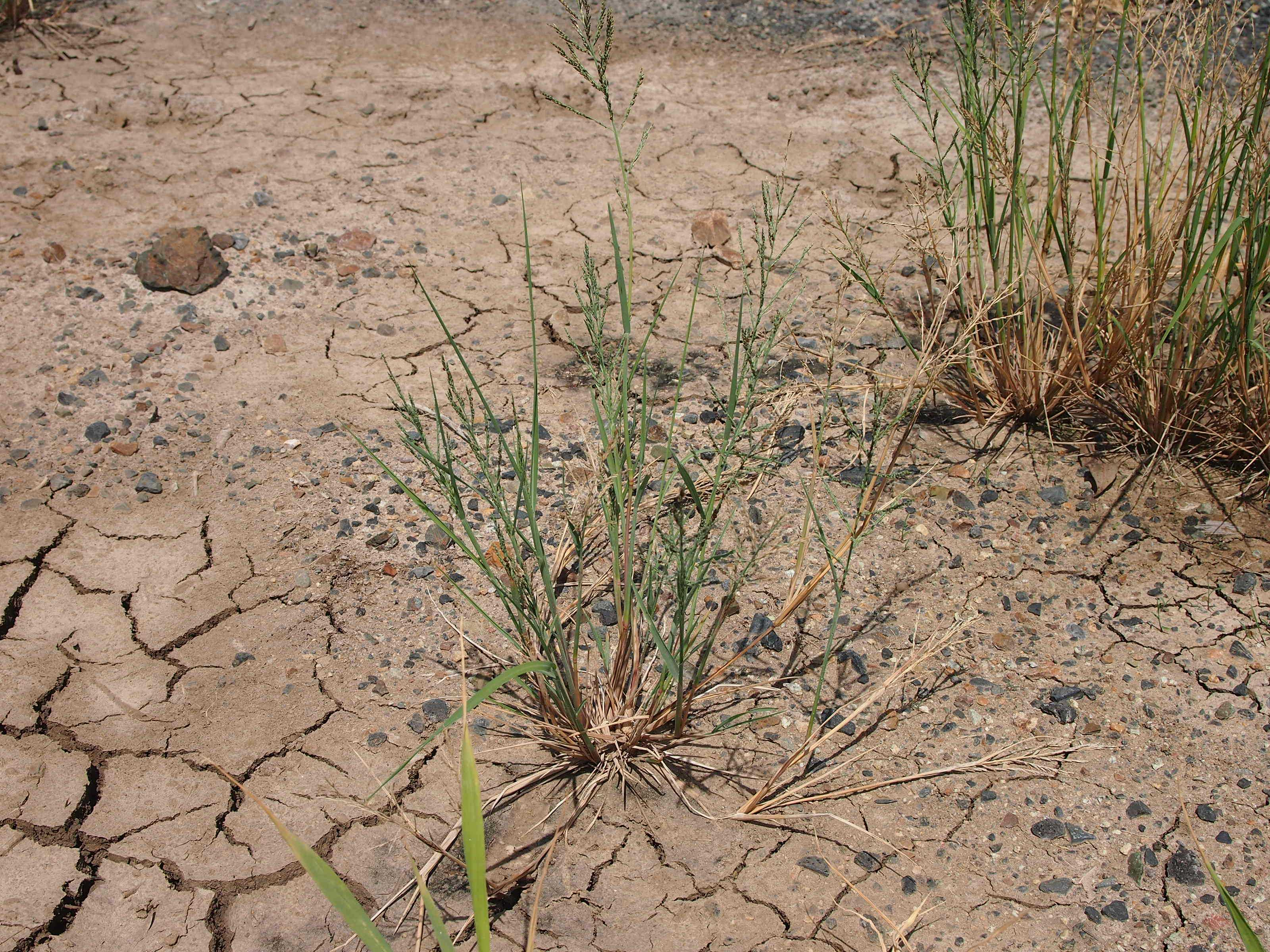
- Diplachne fusca

Scientific classification
- Kingdom: Plantae
- Clade: Tracheophytes
- Clade: Angiosperms
- Clade: Monocots
- Clade: Commelinids
- Order: Poales
- Family: Poaceae
- Subfamily: Chloridoideae
- Tribe: Cynodonteae
- Subtribe: Eleusininae
- Genus: Diplachne; P.Beauv. 1812, not R.Br. ex. Desf. 1819 (Myrtaceae)

Type species
- Diplachne fascicularis (Lam.) P.Beauv.

= Diplachne =

Genus of grasses

Diplachne is a genus of plants in the grass family, widespread over much of the world.

== Species ==
- Diplachne cuspidata Launert - Namibia
- Diplachne fascicularis (Lam.) P.Beauv. - North America, West Indies, South America
- Diplachne festuciformis H.Scholz - Libya
- Diplachne fusca (L.) P.Beauv. ex Roem. & Schult. - North America, West Indies, South America, Asia, Africa, Australia
- Diplachne gigantea Launert - Tanzania, Angola, Zambia, Botswana

== Formerly included ==
over 100 species once considered part of Diplachne but now considered better suited to other genera: Bewsia Catapodium Cleistogenes Disakisperma Enteropogon Eragrostis Festuca Gouinia Leptocarydion Leptochloa Neyraudia Odyssea Orinus Pogonarthria Psilolemma Trichoneura Tripogon Triraphis Verticordia
