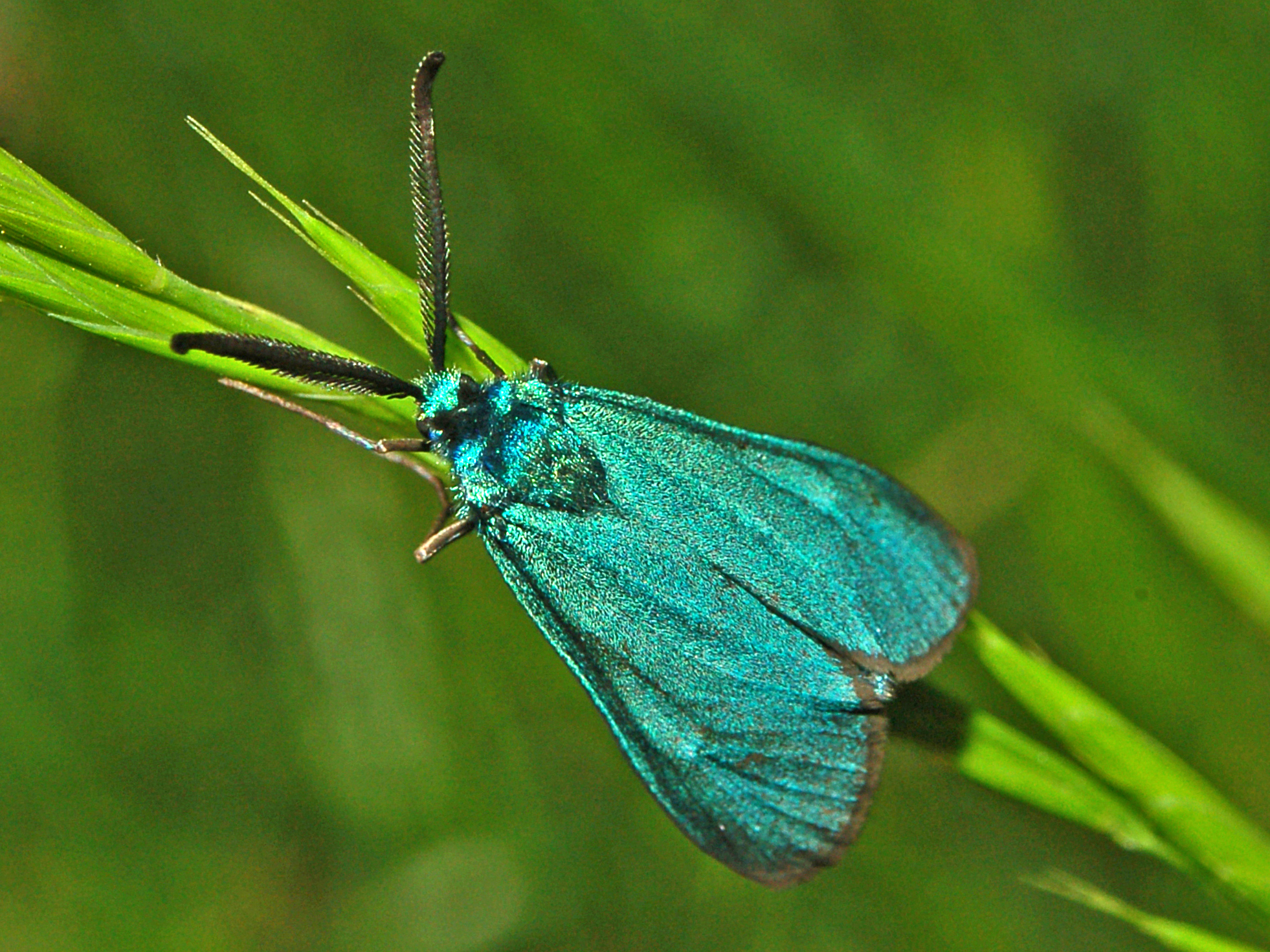
- Adscita species, male

Scientific classification
- Kingdom: Animalia
- Phylum: Arthropoda
- Clade: Pancrustacea
- Class: Insecta
- Order: Lepidoptera
- Family: Zygaenidae
- Subfamily: Procridinae
- Genus: Adscita; Retzius, 1783

Synonyms
- Procris Fabricius, 1807; Ino Leach, [1815]

= Adscita =

Genus of moths

Adscita is a palaearctic genus of moths of the family Zygaenidae, raised by the Swedish entomologist, Anders Jahan Retzius in 1783. The larvae feed on Cistaceae, Compositae, Globulariaceae and Polygonaceae.

== Selected species ==
- Subgenus Procriterna Efetov & Tarmann, 2004
  - Adscita amaura (Staudinger, 1887)
  - Adscita pligori Efetov, 2012
  - Adscita subdolosa (Staudinger, 1887)
  - Adscita subtristis (Staudinger, 1887)
- Subgenus Adscita Retzius, 1783
  - Adscita albanica (Naufock, 1926)
  - Adscita alpina (Alberti, 1937)
  - Adscita bolivari (Agenjo, 1937)
  - Adscita capitalis (Staudinger, 1879)
  - Adscita dujardini Efetov & Tarmann, 2014
  - Adscita geryon (Hübner, [1813])
  - Adscita italica (Alberti, 1937)
  - Adscita jordani (Naufock, 1921)
  - Adscita krymensis Efetov, 1994
  - Adscita mannii (Lederer, 1853)
  - Adscita mauretanica (Naufock, 1932)
  - Adscita obscura (Zeller, 1847)
  - Adscita schmidti (Naufock, 1933)
  - Adscita statices – green forester (Linnaeus, 1758)

== Etymology ==
Adscita from adscitus, meaning adopted or enrolled was originally a Carl Linnaeus name. Linnaeus divided the hawk-moths into four groups, three of which he called the true hawk-moths and the fourth, ″a group of seven hangers-on, in default of a better position″. In 1783 Retzius was the first to use Adscita as a genus and he kept two of these moths in the Adscita, i.e. statices and filipendulae (which was later assigned to Zygaena. Of the two synonyms for Adscita; the Danish zoologist, Fabricius erected Procris as a genus in 1807. Procris was the daughter of Erechtheus and wife of Cephalus. A second synonyom is Ino.
