= Leptostachys =

Leptostachys may refer to two different genera of plants:

- Leptostachys G.Mey., a taxonomic synonym for the sprangletop genus Leptochloa
- Leptostachys Ehrh., a taxonomic synonym for the sedge genus Carex
