= Sickle grass =

Sickle grass is a common name for several plants and may refer to:

- Parapholis incurva, native to Europe, Asia, and northern Africa
- Pogonarthria squarrosa
