= Adscita italica =

Scientific classification
- Kingdom: Animalia
- Phylum: Arthropoda
- Clade: Pancrustacea
- Class: Insecta
- Order: Lepidoptera
- Family: Zygaenidae
- Genus: Adscita
- Species: A. italica

Binomial name
- Adscita italica (Alberti, 1937)

Synonyms
- Procris italica Alberti, 1937

Species of moth

Adscita italica is a moth of the family Zygaenidae. It is found in mainland Italy, in Sicily, and in Turkey.

== Taxonomy ==
It was formerly treated as a subspecies of Adscita alpina.
