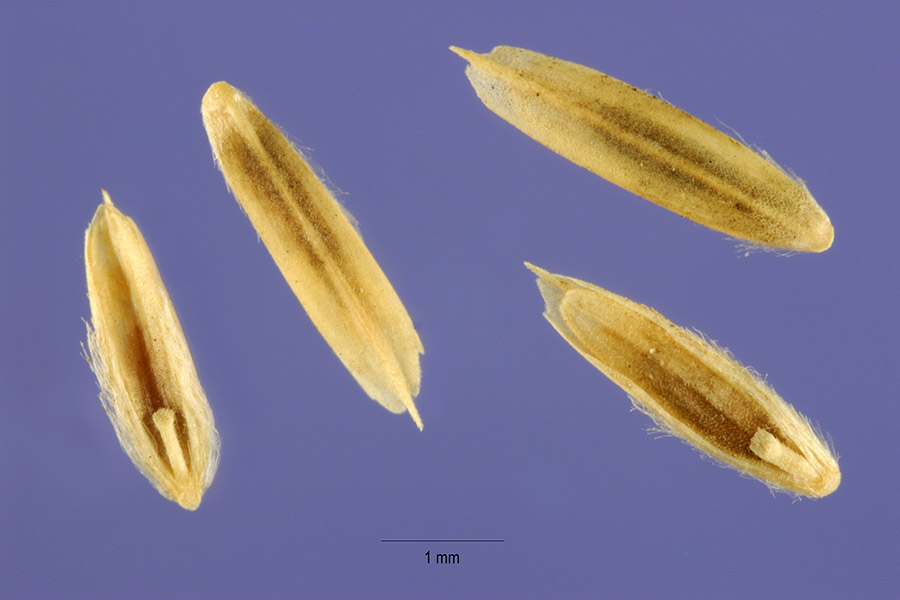
- seeds

Conservation status
- Secure (NatureServe)

Scientific classification
- Kingdom: Plantae
- Clade: Embryophytes
- Clade: Tracheophytes
- Clade: Spermatophytes
- Clade: Angiosperms
- Clade: Monocots
- Clade: Commelinids
- Order: Poales
- Family: Poaceae
- Subfamily: Chloridoideae
- Genus: Disakisperma
- Species: D. dubium

Binomial name
- Disakisperma dubium (Kunth) P.M.Peterson & N.Snow

Synonyms
- Chloris dubia Kunth; Diplachne dubia (Kunth) Scribn. Leptochloa dubia (Kunth) Nees

= Disakisperma dubium =

Species of grass

Disakisperma dubium is a species of grass known by the common names green sprangletop and zacate gigante. It is native to the Americas, where it is distributed from the United States to Argentina.

This perennial grass grows up to 110 centimeters tall. The leaves are up to 35 centimeters long and are hairless to hairy or rough in texture. The leaf sheaths are sometimes purplish. The inflorescence is a branching panicle with brown or greenish spikelets.

This grass is a good forage for animals and it is sometimes added to seed mixes used for vegetating rangeland.
