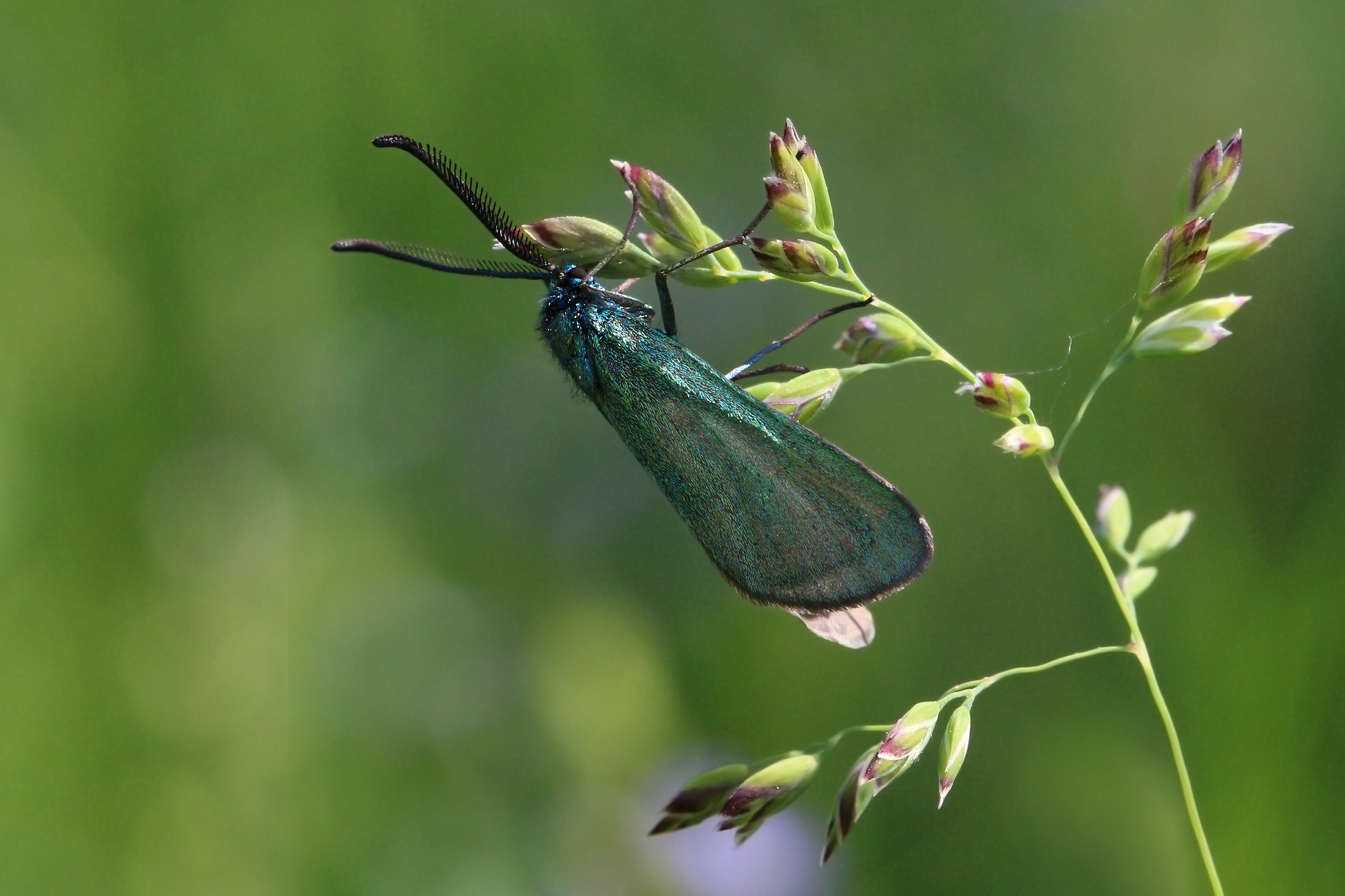
- In the Kampinos Forest, Poland

Scientific classification
- Kingdom: Animalia
- Phylum: Arthropoda
- Clade: Pancrustacea
- Class: Insecta
- Order: Lepidoptera
- Family: Zygaenidae
- Genus: Adscita
- Species: A. statices

Binomial name
- Adscita statices (Linnaeus, 1758)

Synonyms
- Sphinx statices Linnaeus, 1758

= Adscita statices =

Green forester

Species of moth

Adscita statices, (also known as the forester and the green forester), is a day-flying moth of the family Zygaenidae. First described by the Swedish biologist Carl Linnaeus in 1758, it is found in Asia and Europe.

== Description ==
The wingspan is 25–28 millimetres (0.98–1.10 in). The antennae, head, thorax, legs and abdomen are shiny green (the thorax is occasionally blue green and shimmering). However, the wings may appear rusty-red in the early morning and evening. The wide forewings are less glossy than the body, mostly blue green, sometimes also green to yellow green. The fringes are blackish grey. The hindwings are moderately wide with a slightly truncated rim, They are slightly transparent, blackish grey and lightened basally. The underside of both pairs of wings is grey. The caterpillars are pale yellowish-green with a central dark stripe and fine white hairs dorsally. The wings of the green forester contain two types of colored scales, of which one contains pores of different sizes. These pores are able to fill with water, which causes the color of the scales to change from green to rusty-red.

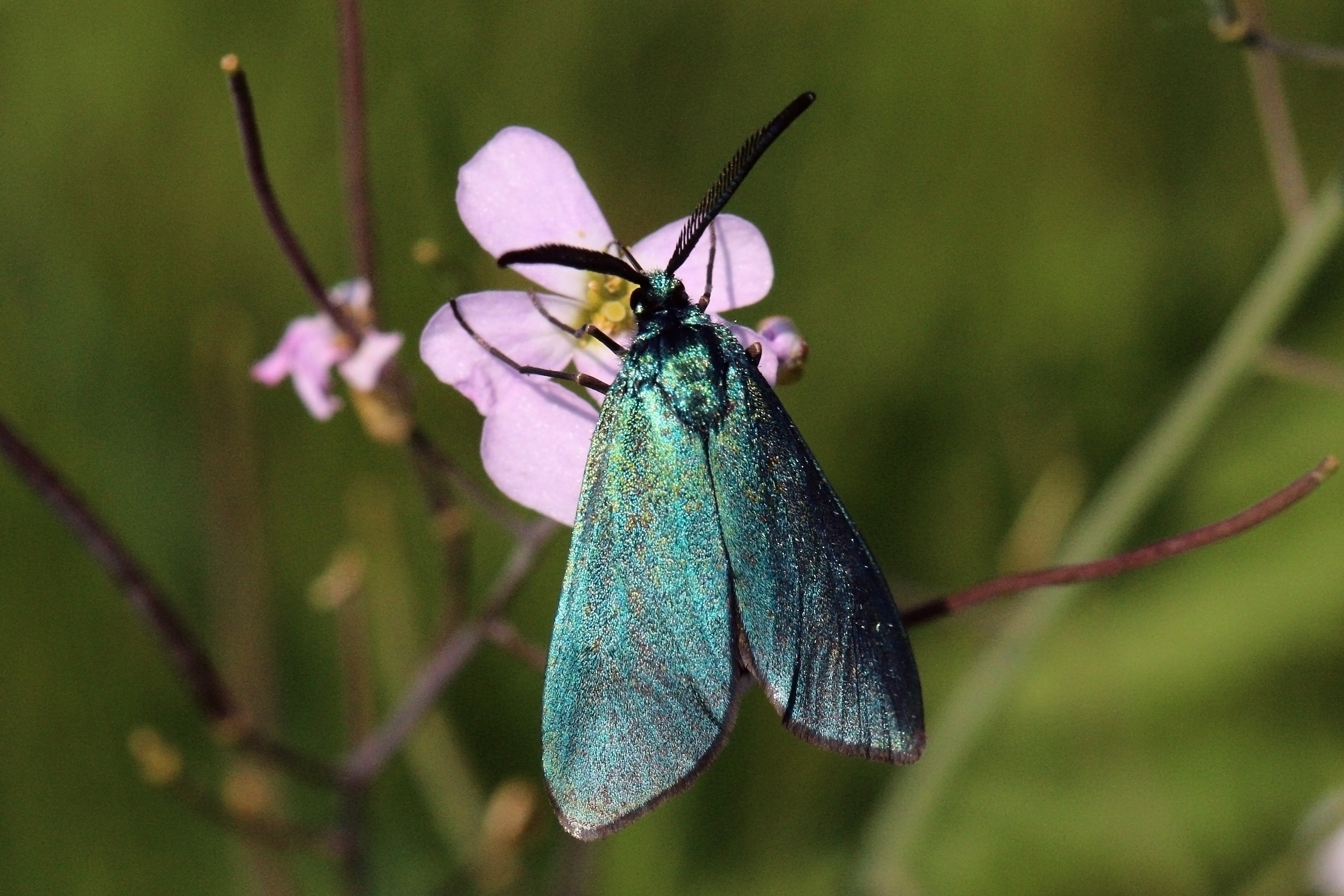
Dorsal view

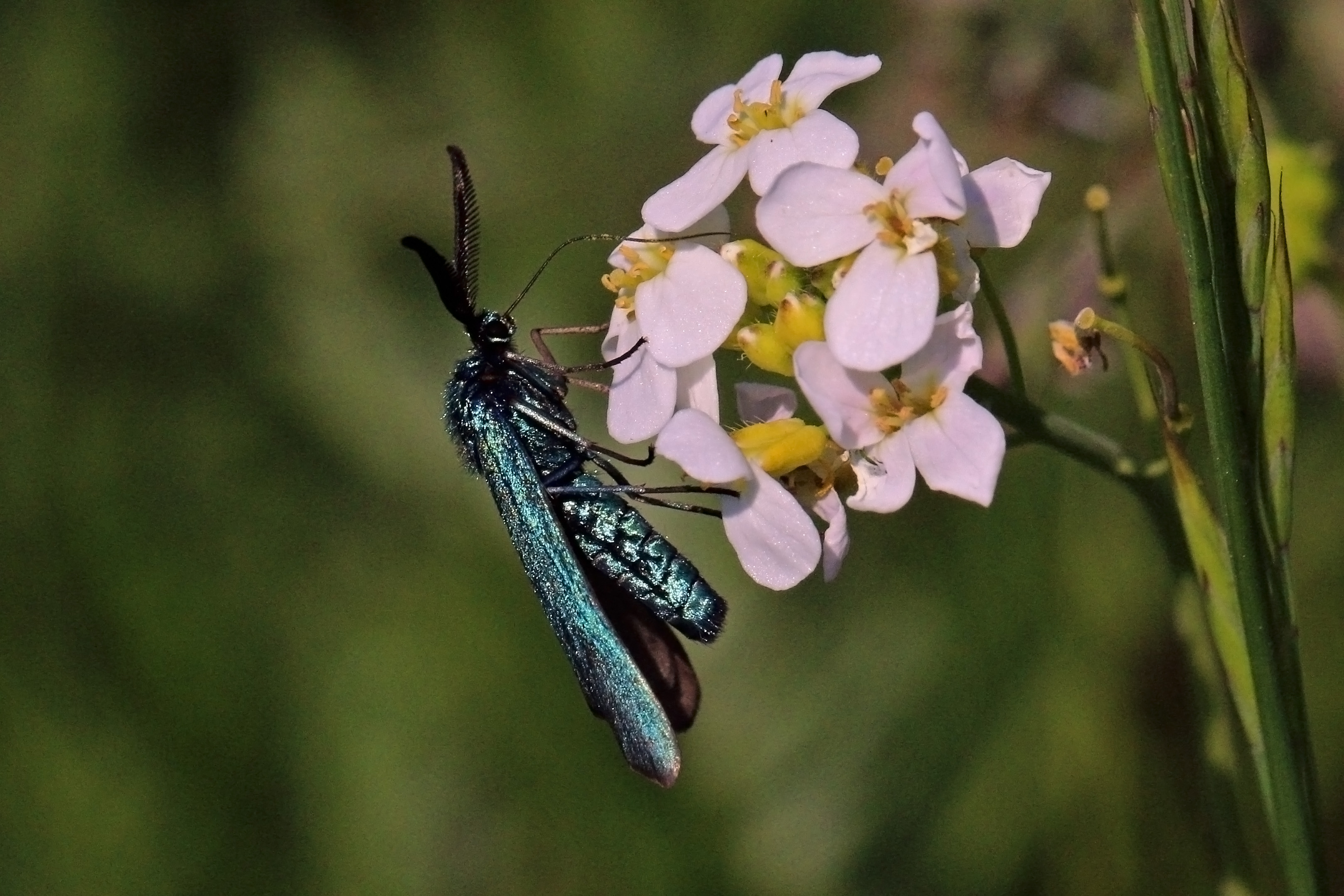
Lateral view

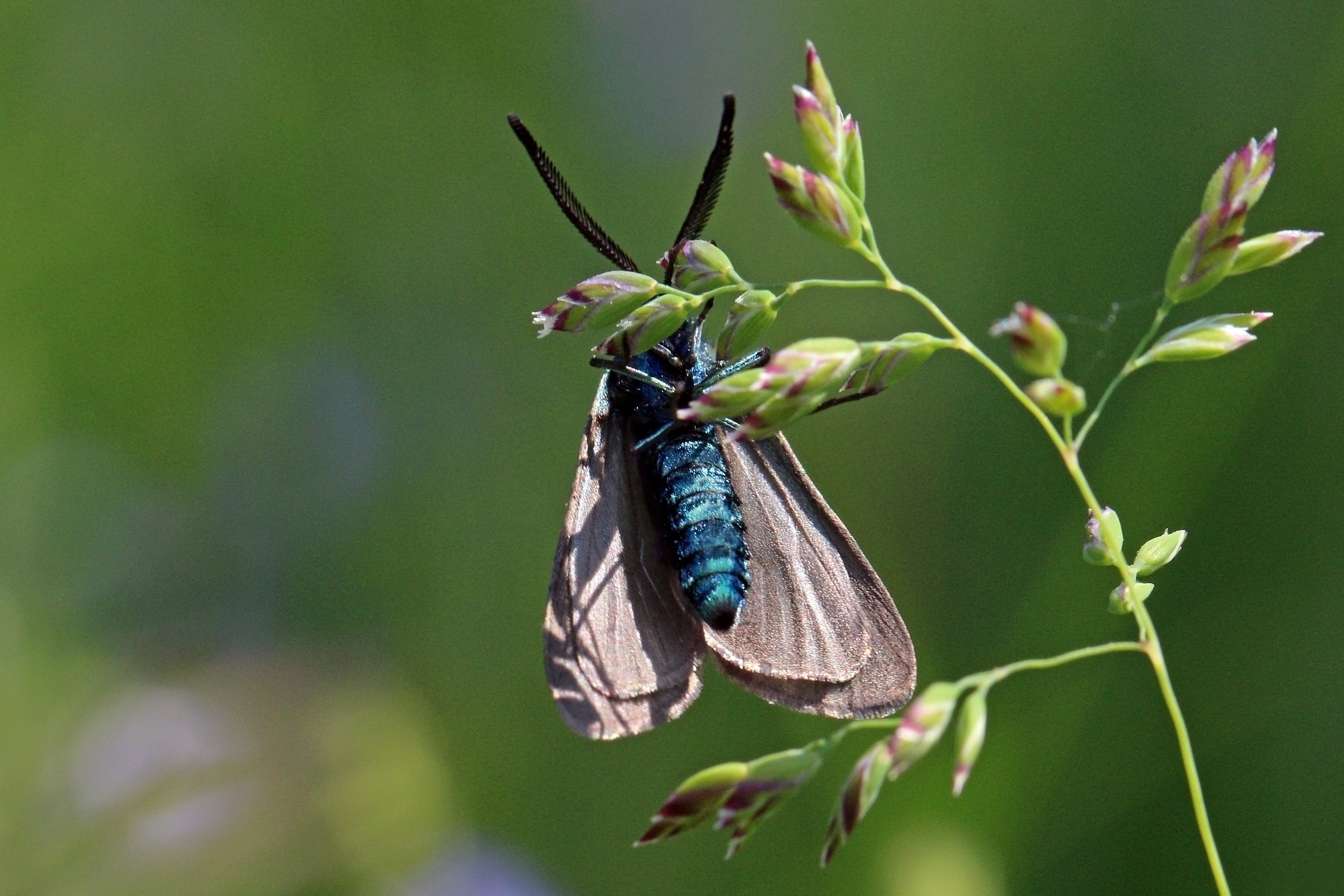
Ventral view

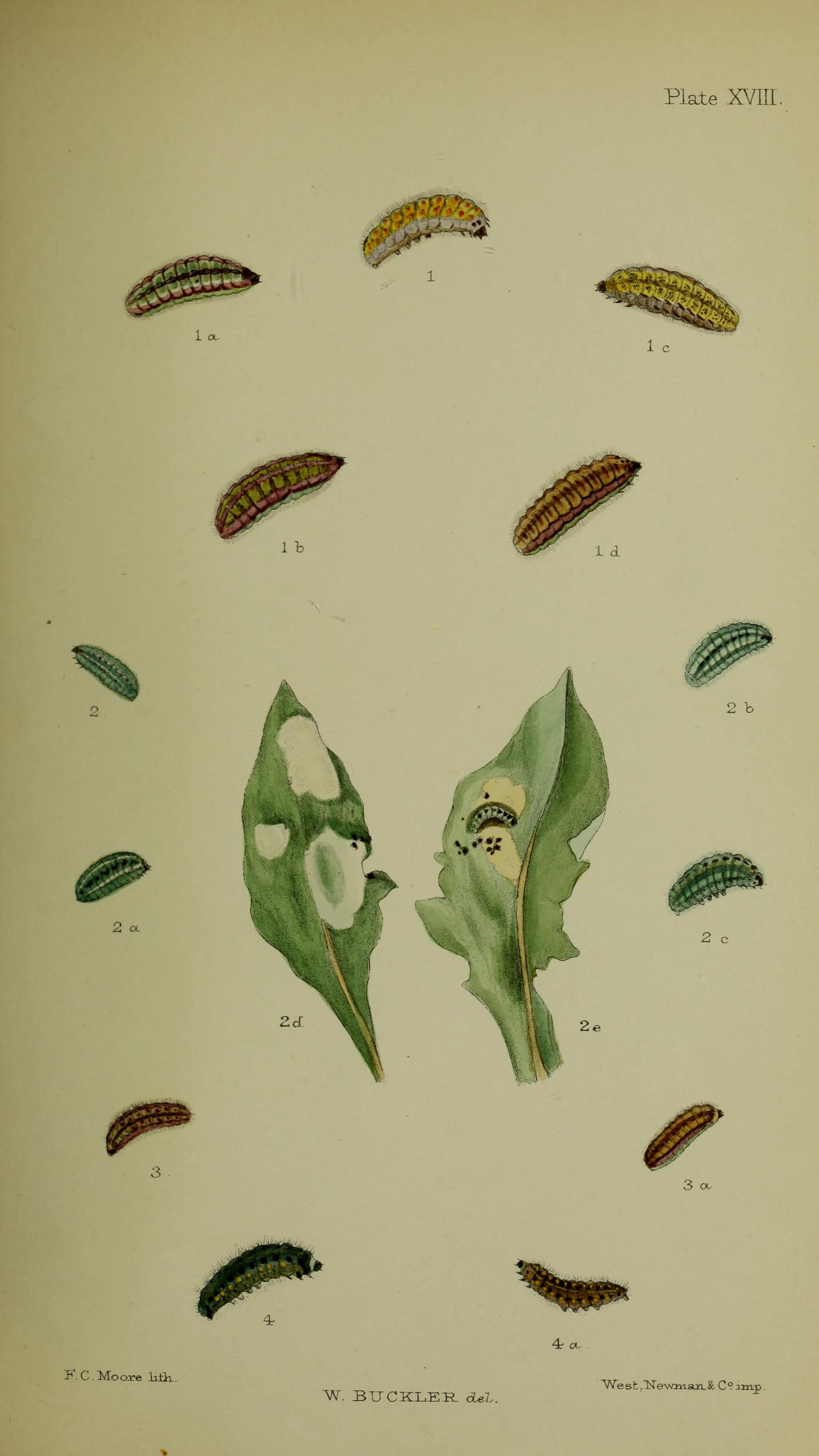
Figs. 1, 1a, 1b, 1c, 1d, 1e larvae after last moult

== Biology ==
The moth flies in sunshine from mid-May to early August.

Ovum

Eggs are light yellow, a flattened-ovoid shape and laid in June to early July on the leaf blade of various species of Rumex, such as common sorrel (Rumex acetosa) and sheeps sorrel (Rumex acetosella).

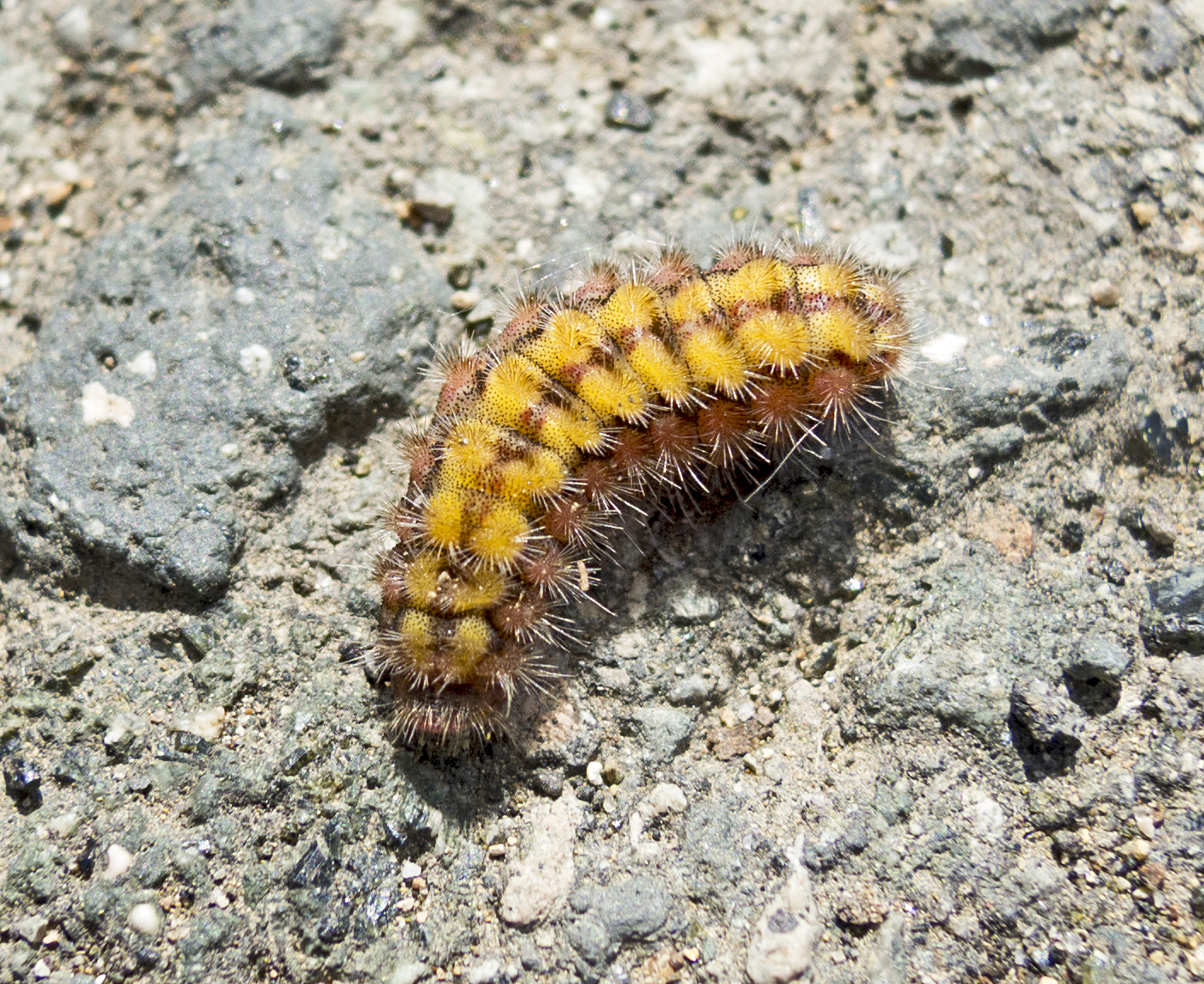
Larva

Larvae and cocoon

In July and August, when small, the larva mines a leaf (usually on the underside), but later feeds exposed on the lower leaves of the plant. When fully developed in May it descends to the ground and pupates in a cocoon among the vegetation. The cocoon is flimsy and made of loosely woven white silk with the light-brown pupa visible.

== Distribution ==
Found throughout Europe to Turkey and the Caucasus Mountains.

=== British Isles ===
Much declined from its former distribution in England and Wales, it is now found in southern and eastern England, Wales and local in south-western and western Scotland. Widely scattered and local in Ireland and has become very scarce in Northern Ireland, with recent records from northern County Armagh and western County Fermanagh, and because of its rarity there, it is listed as a Northern Ireland Priority Species.

== Etymology ==
Adscita from adscitus, meaning adopted or enrolled was originally a Carl Linnaeus name. Linnaeus divided the hawk-moths into four groups, three of which he called the true hawk-moths and the fourth, ″a group of seven hangers-on, in default of a better position″. In 1783 Retzius was the first to use Adscita as a genus and he kept two of these moths in the Adscita, i.e. statices and filipendulae (the six-spot burnet, which was later assigned to Zygaena). Linnaeus gave the moth the specific name statices, which refers to the plant Statice armeria (now Armeria maritimum). Thrift is not the foodplant and Linnaeus never thought it was and quotes Ray and Petiver who both thought the Forester was a butterfly.

== Bibliography ==
- Šašić, Martina; Nahirnić, Ana; Tarmann, Gerhard M. (2016-12-31). "Zygaenidae (Lepidoptera) in the Lepidoptera collections of the Croatian Natural History Museum". Natura Croatica: Periodicum Musei Historiae Naturalis Croatici. 25 (2): 233–248. doi:10.20302/NC.2016.25.19. eISSN 1848-7386.
