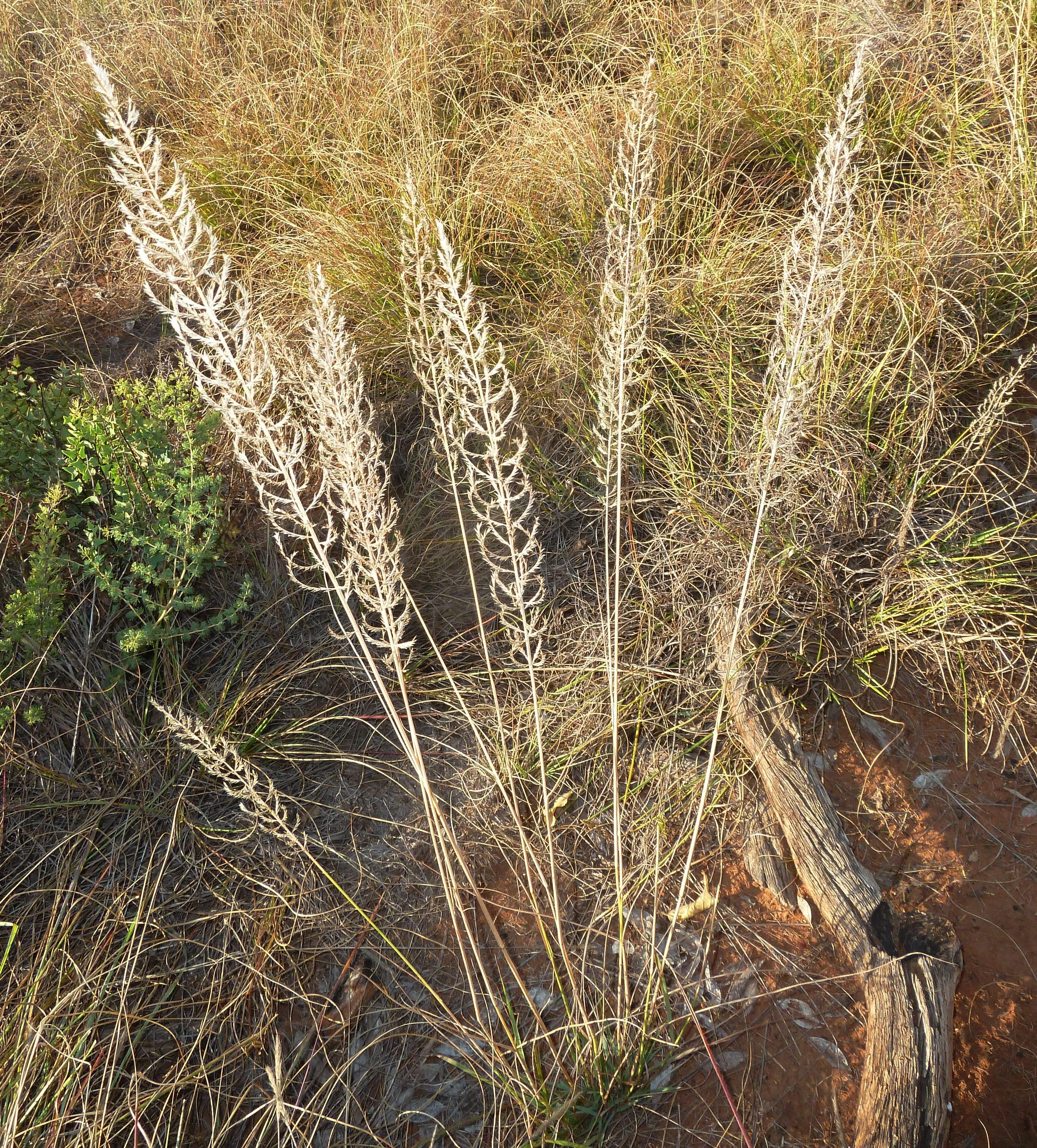
- Pogonarthria squarrosa

Scientific classification
- Kingdom: Plantae
- Clade: Tracheophytes
- Clade: Angiosperms
- Clade: Monocots
- Clade: Commelinids
- Order: Poales
- Family: Poaceae
- Subfamily: Chloridoideae
- Tribe: Eragrostideae
- Subtribe: Eragrostidinae
- Genus: Pogonarthria; Stapf

= Pogonarthria =

Genus of grasses

Pogonarthria is a genus of African plants in the grass family.

Species

- Pogonarthria fleckii (Hack.) Hack. - Angola, Mozambique, Zambia, Zimbabwe, Botswana, Namibia
- Pogonarthria leiarthra Hack. - Namibia
- Pogonarthria refracta Launert - Zambia
- Pogonarthria squarrosa (Roem. & Schult.) Pilg. - Africa from Ivory Coast to South Africa and Madagascar; naturalized in Arizona (Cochise and Pima Counties)

Formerly included

see Desmostachya Eragrostis

- Pogonarthria bipinnata - Desmostachya bipinnata
- Pogonarthria brainii - Eragrostis brainii
