= Adscita mauretanica =

Scientific classification
- Kingdom: Animalia
- Phylum: Arthropoda
- Clade: Pancrustacea
- Class: Insecta
- Order: Lepidoptera
- Family: Zygaenidae
- Genus: Adscita
- Species: A. mauretanica

Binomial name
- Adscita mauretanica (Naufock, 1932)

Synonyms
- Procris mauretanica Naufock, 1932; Adscita mauretanica meson Dujardin, 1973

Species of moth

Adscita mauretanica is a moth of the family Zygaenidae. It is found in Morocco and north-western Algeria

The length of the forewings is 8.5–13 mm for males and 8.5–12.3 mm for females. Adults are on wing from May at low altitudes up to August at high altitudes.

The larvae of subspecies A. m. mauretanica feed on Helianthemum species, while the larvae of subspecies A. m. wiegeli feed on Rumex acetosa atlanticus. Before overwintering, the larvae live as leaf miners. Pupation takes place in a cocoon at the ground.

== Subspecies ==
- Adscita mauretanica mauretanica (Middle Atlas, Rif Mountains of Morocco, north-western Algeria)
- Adscita mauretanica wiegeli (Alberti, 1973) (High Atlas)
