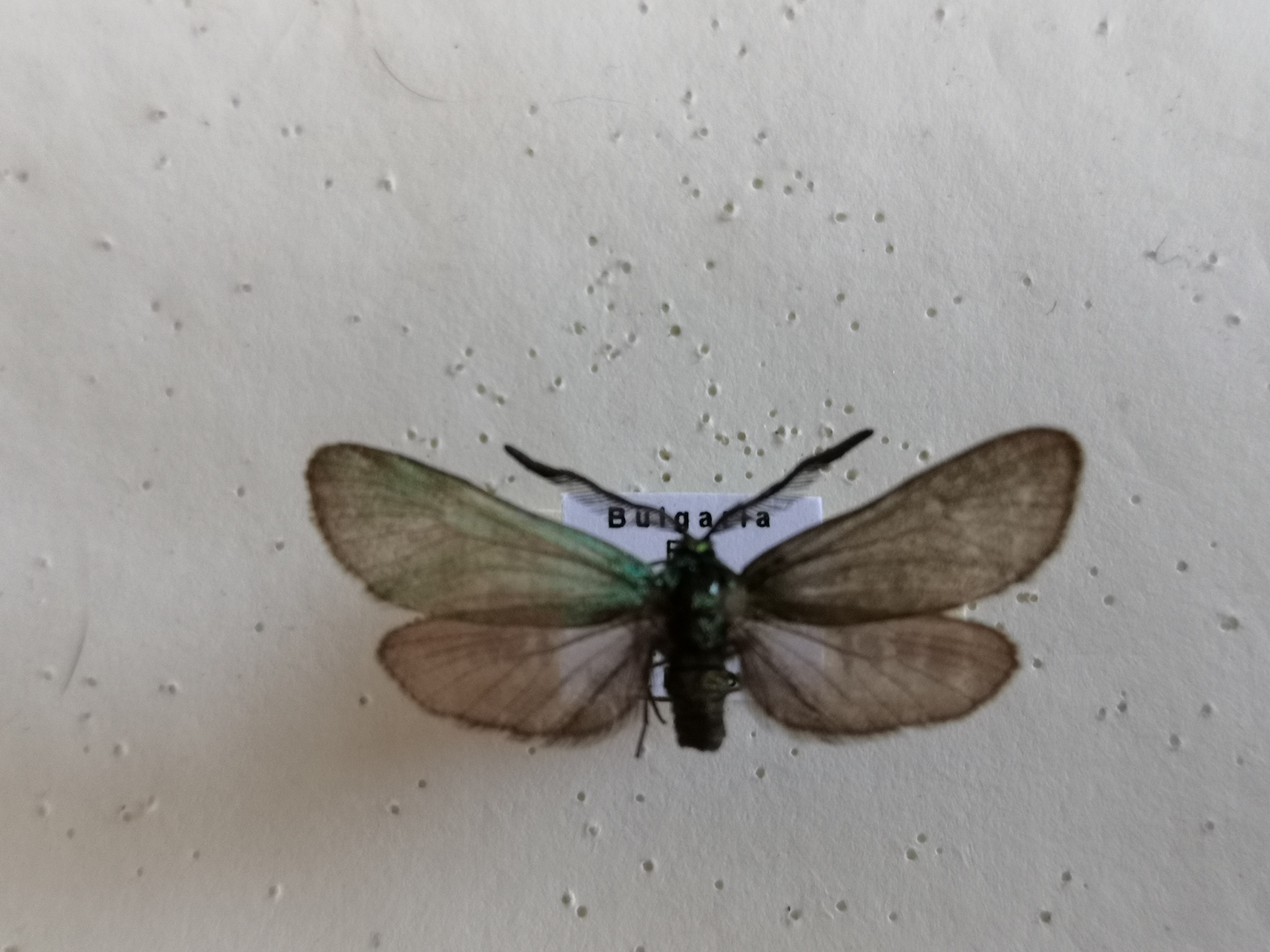

Scientific classification
- Kingdom: Animalia
- Phylum: Arthropoda
- Clade: Pancrustacea
- Class: Insecta
- Order: Lepidoptera
- Family: Zygaenidae
- Genus: Adscita
- Species: A. albanica

Binomial name
- Adscita albanica (Naufock, 1926)

Synonyms
- Procris albanica Naufock, 1926

= Adscita albanica =

Species of moth

Adscita albanica is a moth of the family Zygaenidae. It has a disjunct distribution, which included south-eastern France, Switzerland (Kanton Wallis), in Italy, Slovenia, North Macedonia, Albania, Bulgaria, Greece, Ukraine, the southern part of European Russia and the Caucasus.

The length of the forewings is 9.5–12.0 mm (0.37–0.47 in) for males and 8.5–11.5 mm (0.33–0.45 in) for females. Adults are on wing from the end of May (Crimea) to mid June (Albania and Switzerland). They feed on the flower nectar of Geranium species.

The larvae feed on Geranium sanguineum.
