= Adscita bolivari =

Scientific classification
- Kingdom: Animalia
- Phylum: Arthropoda
- Clade: Pancrustacea
- Class: Insecta
- Order: Lepidoptera
- Family: Zygaenidae
- Genus: Adscita
- Species: A. bolivari

Binomial name
- Adscita bolivari (Agenjo, 1937)

Synonyms
- Procris bolivari Agenjo, 1937

Species of moth

Adscita bolivari is a moth of the family Zygaenidae. It is endemic to Spain (where it is absent from the north-east and the Pyrenees).

The length of the forewings is 9–10 mm for males and females. Adults are on wing from June to July.

The larvae probably feed on Helianthemum species.
