= Adscita obscura =

Scientific classification
- Kingdom: Animalia
- Phylum: Arthropoda
- Clade: Pancrustacea
- Class: Insecta
- Order: Lepidoptera
- Family: Zygaenidae
- Genus: Adscita
- Species: A. obscura

Binomial name
- Adscita obscura (Zeller, 1847)

Synonyms
- Procris obscura Zeller, 1847

Species of moth

Adscita obscura is a moth of the family Zygaenidae. It is found in Bulgaria, the Republic of Macedonia, Albania and Greece, as well as in Turkey, Iran, Russia, Transcaucasia, Syria, Lebanon, Israel and Egypt.

The larvae possibly feed on Helianthemum species.

== Subspecies ==
- Adscita obscura obscura
- Adscita obscura balcanica Staudinger 1862
