= Adscita krymensis =

Scientific classification
- Kingdom: Animalia
- Phylum: Arthropoda
- Clade: Pancrustacea
- Class: Insecta
- Order: Lepidoptera
- Family: Zygaenidae
- Genus: Adscita
- Species: A. krymensis

Binomial name
- Adscita krymensis Efetov, 1994

Species of moth

Adscita krymensis is a moth of the family Zygaenidae. It is only known from the Crimea

The length of the forewings is about 11.5 mm for males.
