= Adscita capitalis =

Scientific classification
- Kingdom: Animalia
- Phylum: Arthropoda
- Clade: Pancrustacea
- Class: Insecta
- Order: Lepidoptera
- Family: Zygaenidae
- Genus: Adscita
- Species: A. capitalis

Binomial name
- Adscita capitalis (Staudinger, 1879)

Synonyms
- Ino capitalis Staudinger, 1879

Species of moth

Adscita capitalis is a moth of the family Zygaenidae. It is found in North Macedonia, Greece (including Samos) and Turkey.

The length of the forewings is 9.5–11.4 mm for males and 9.4–10.5 mm for females. Adults are on wing from June to July.

The larvae mainly feed on Helianthemum canum, but have also been recorded feeding on Helianthemum grandifloris, Helianthemum georgicum and Helianthemum nummularium.
