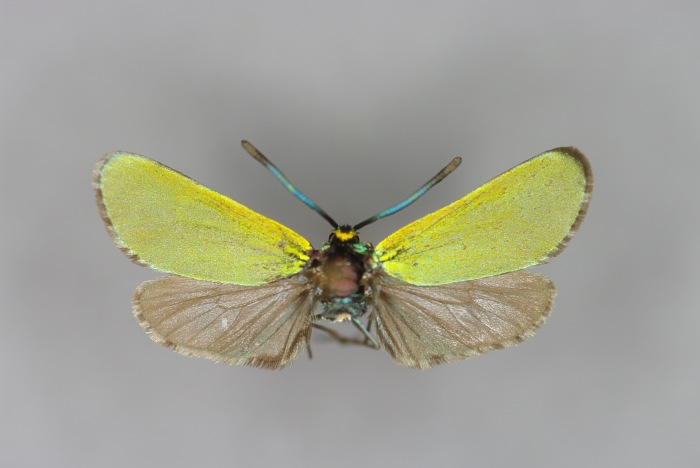

Scientific classification
- Kingdom: Animalia
- Phylum: Arthropoda
- Clade: Pancrustacea
- Class: Insecta
- Order: Lepidoptera
- Family: Zygaenidae
- Genus: Adscita
- Species: A. mannii

Binomial name
- Adscita mannii (Lederer, 1853)

Synonyms
- Ino mannii Lederer, 1853

= Adscita mannii =

Species of moth

Adscita mannii is a moth of the family Zygaenidae. It is found in Germany, France, Switzerland, Austria, Italy, Spain, Slovenia and the Balkan Peninsula. The range extends to north-western Turkey.

The larvae possibly feed on Helianthemum species and Fabaceae species, including Onobrychis.

== Subspecies ==
- Adscita mannii mannii
- Adscita mannii atlantica Alberti, 1937

== Bibliography ==
- Šašić, Martina; Nahirnić, Ana; Tarmann, Gerhard M. (2016-12-31). "Zygaenidae (Lepidoptera) in the Lepidoptera collections of the Croatian Natural History Museum". Natura Croatica: Periodicum Musei Historiae Naturalis Croatici. 25 (2): 233–248. doi:10.20302/NC.2016.25.19. eISSN 1848-7386.
