= Adscita schmidti =

Scientific classification
- Kingdom: Animalia
- Phylum: Arthropoda
- Clade: Pancrustacea
- Class: Insecta
- Order: Lepidoptera
- Family: Zygaenidae
- Genus: Adscita
- Species: A. schmidti

Binomial name
- Adscita schmidti (Naufock, 1933)

Synonyms
- Procris schmidti Naufock, 1933

Species of moth

Adscita schmidti is a moth of the family Zygaenidae. It is found on the Iberian Peninsula west of the Ebro river.

The length of the forewings is 10–13.5 mm for males and 9–13 mm for females. Adults are on wing from May to August.

The larvae feed on Rumex acetosa and Rumex acetosella.
