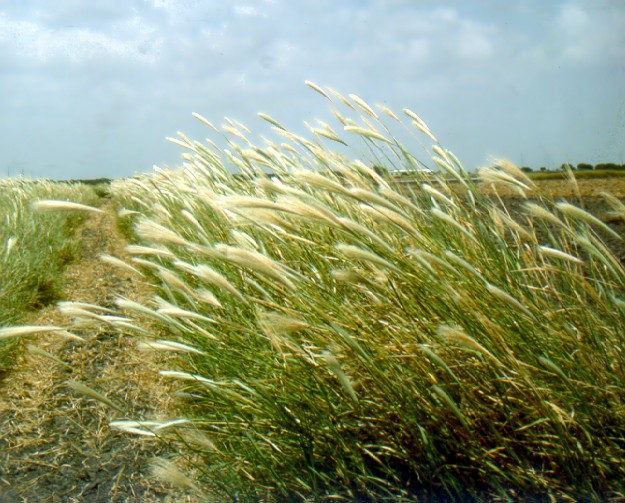

Scientific classification
- Kingdom: Plantae
- Clade: Tracheophytes
- Clade: Angiosperms
- Clade: Monocots
- Clade: Commelinids
- Order: Poales
- Family: Poaceae
- Subfamily: Chloridoideae
- Genus: Leptochloa
- Species: L. crinita

Binomial name
- Leptochloa crinita (Lag.) P.M.Peterson & N.Snow

Synonyms
- Chloris crinita Lag.; Chloris mendocina Phil.; Chloris trichodes Lag. ex Parodi, pro syn.; Chloropsis blanchardiana (Hack.) Kuntze; Chloropsis crinita (Lag.) Kuntze; Chloropsis fasciculata (E.Fourn.) Kuntze; Chloropsis mendocina (Phil.) Kuntze; Leptochloris crinita Munro ex Kuntze, pro syn.; Leptochloris greggii Munro ex Merr., pro syn.; Trichloris blanchardiana Hack.; Trichloris crinita (Lag.) Parodi; Trichloris crinita var. triflora Parodi; Trichloris crinita var. typica Parodi, not validly publ.; Trichloris fasciculata E.Fourn.; Trichloris mendocina (Phil.) Kurtz; Trichloris verticillata E.Fourn. ex Vasey

= Leptochloa crinita =

Species of grass

Leptochloa crinita, synonyms including Trichloris crinita, is a species of flowering plant in the grass family Poaceae. It is known by the common name false Rhodes grass. It is native to the Americas, where it occurs in the southwestern United States, northern Mexico, and South America from Peru to south Argentina.

This perennial grass reaches up to 1 meter tall. It sometimes spreads via stolons. The rough-haired leaves are up to 20 centimeters long by 1 centimeter wide. The panicle is a cluster of up to 20 branches arranged in tight whorls. Each branch is up to 15 centimeters long and lined with tiny spikelets. Each spikelet has one bisexual and one or two sterile flowers.

This species is a common forage grass on dry plains in Argentina. In the US it is used for range revegetation.
