= Adscita jordani =

Scientific classification
- Kingdom: Animalia
- Phylum: Arthropoda
- Clade: Pancrustacea
- Class: Insecta
- Order: Lepidoptera
- Family: Zygaenidae
- Genus: Adscita
- Species: A. jordani

Binomial name
- Adscita jordani (Naufock, 1921)

Synonyms
- Procris jordani Naufock, 1921

Species of moth

Adscita jordani is a moth of the family Zygaenidae. It is found in Portugal and Spain (except the north-east and the Pyrenees).

The length of the forewings is 10–11.5 mm for males and 10–11 mm for females. Adults are on wing from April to August.

== Etymology ==
It is named for Karl Jordan.
