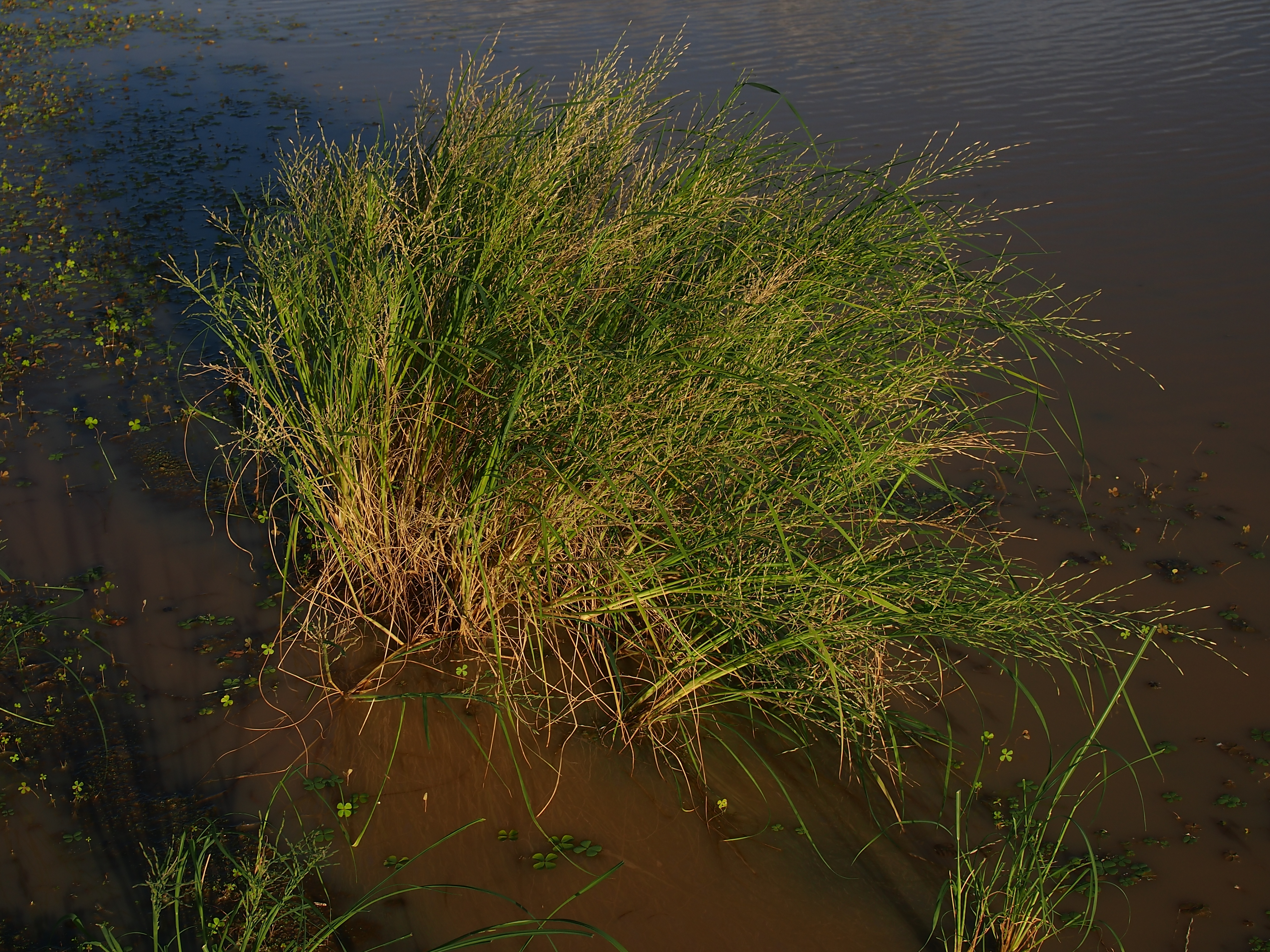
- In its typical habitat

Conservation status
- Least Concern (IUCN 3.1)

Scientific classification
- Kingdom: Plantae
- Clade: Embryophytes
- Clade: Tracheophytes
- Clade: Spermatophytes
- Clade: Angiosperms
- Clade: Monocots
- Clade: Commelinids
- Order: Poales
- Family: Poaceae
- Subfamily: Chloridoideae
- Genus: Diplachne
- Species: D. fusca

Binomial name
- Diplachne fusca (L.) P.Beauv. ex Roem. & Schult.

Synonyms
- List: Bromus polystachios Forssk.; Diplachne polystachia Backer; Festuca fusca L.; Leptochloa fusca (L.) Kunth; Poa fusca (L.) Desf.

= Diplachne fusca =

Species of plant

Diplachne fusca, called bearded sprangletop and Kallar grass, is a widespread species of grass in the genus Diplachne, native to North America, the Caribbean, South America, Africa, Asia, and Australia, and introduced in Europe, New Zealand and Hawaii, among other places. It prefers to live in salty, wet conditions, such as in salt marshes and shallow depressions.

== Subspecies ==
The following subspecies are currently accepted:

- Diplachne fusca subsp. fascicularis (Lam.) P.M.Peterson & N.Snow
- Diplachne fusca subsp. fusca
- Diplachne fusca subsp. muelleri (Benth.) P.M.Peterson & N.Snow
- Diplachne fusca subsp. uninervia (J.Presl) P.M.Peterson & N.Snow
