= Myriostachya =

Scientific classification
- Kingdom: Plantae
- Clade: Tracheophytes
- Clade: Angiosperms
- Clade: Monocots
- Clade: Commelinids
- Order: Poales
- Family: Poaceae
- Subfamily: Chloridoideae
- Genus: Myriostachya (Benth.) Hook.f.
- Species: M. wightiana

Binomial name
- Myriostachya wightiana (Nees ex Steud.) Hook.f.

Synonyms
- Eragrostis sect. Myriostachya Benth.; Leptochloa wightiana Nees ex Steud; Eragrostis wightiana (Nees ex Steud.) Benth.; Festuca natans Buch.-Ham. ex Wall.; Dinebra verticillata Wight ex Steud.; Myriostachya wightiana var. longispicula Hook.f.; Myriostachya longispicula (Hook.f.) Senaratna

Genus of grasses

Myriostachya is a genus of Asian plants in the grass family. The only known species is Myriostachya wightiana, native to India, Bangladesh, Sri Lanka, Myanmar, Thailand, Sumatra, and Peninsular Malaysia.
