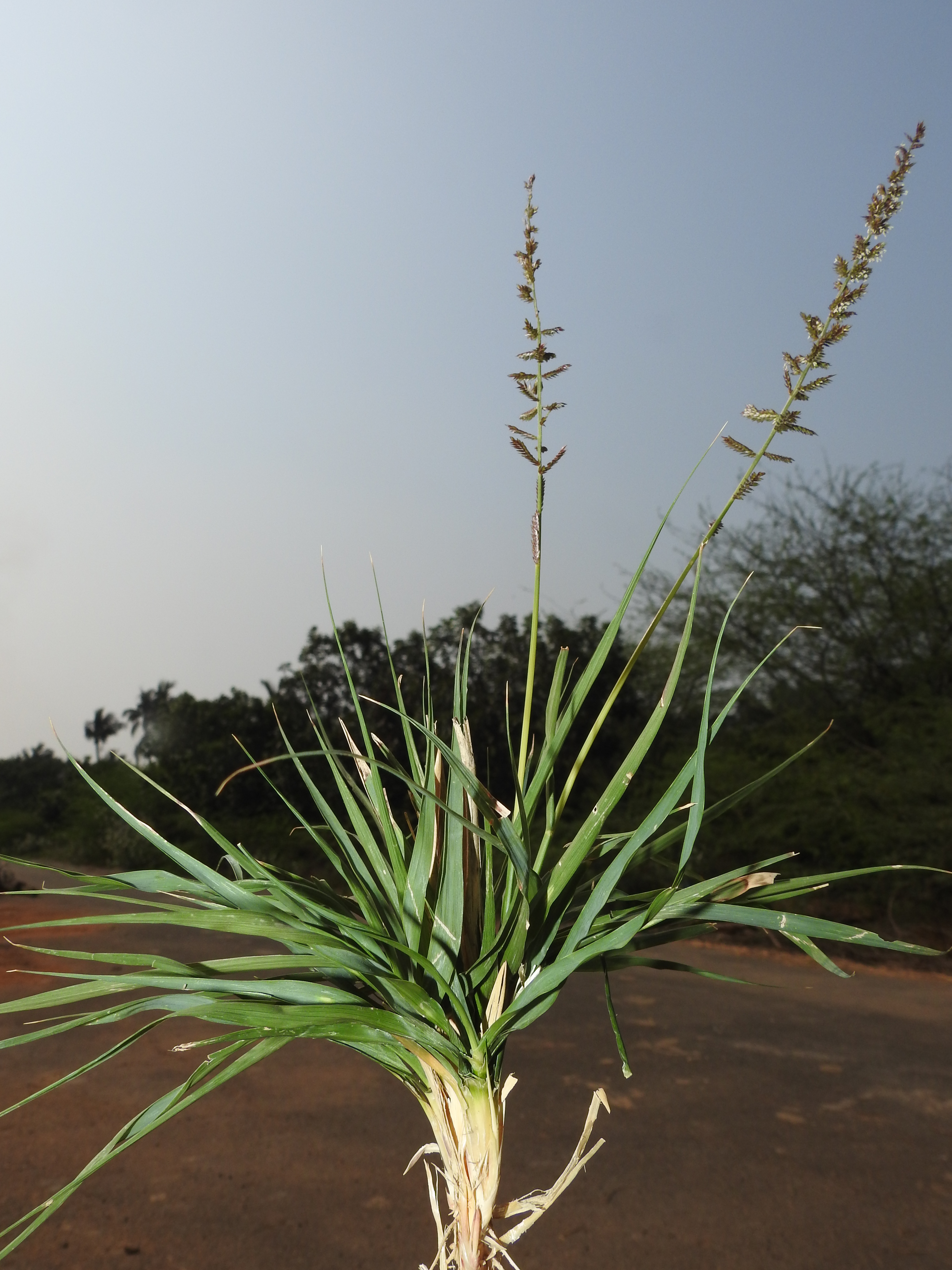
- Desmostachya bipinnata, habit

Scientific classification
- Kingdom: Plantae
- Clade: Tracheophytes
- Clade: Angiosperms
- Clade: Monocots
- Clade: Commelinids
- Order: Poales
- Family: Poaceae
- Subfamily: Chloridoideae
- Tribe: Cynodonteae
- Subtribe: Tripogoninae
- Genus: Desmostachya (Stapf) Stapf

Synonyms
- Eragrostis sect. Desmostachya Stapf (basionym); Stapfiola Kuntze (nom. illeg. superfl.)

= Desmostachya =

Genus of grasses

Desmostachya is a genus of grasses in the family Poaceae. It is native to Africa and Asia.

== Taxonomy ==
The genus Desmostachya was originally published as Eragrostis sect. Desmostachya in The Flora of British India 7: 324. 1897. Somehow two prominent botanists, Joseph Dalton Hooker (1817–1911) and Otto Stapf (1857–1933), were originally each credited separately as the naming authority for the taxon (the type specimen for this section of Eragrostis being Eragrostis cynosuroides (Retz.) P.Beauv., itself based on a previous species taxon, Poa cynosuroides Retz.). It is generally accepted that Eragrostis sect. Desmostachya Hook.f. is the correct name for the taxon. However, E. sect. Desmostachya Stapf is accepted as the basionym for the genus name Desmostachya. A year after it was published as a section of Eragrostis, Desmostachya was published as a genus in its own right in Flora Capensis 7: 316. 1898. Two species are recognized:

- Desmostachya bipinnata (L.) Stapf (commonly known variously as, Kusha grass, Kusa grass, or Darbha Grass )
- Desmostachya cynosuroides Stapf ex Massey

List source :
