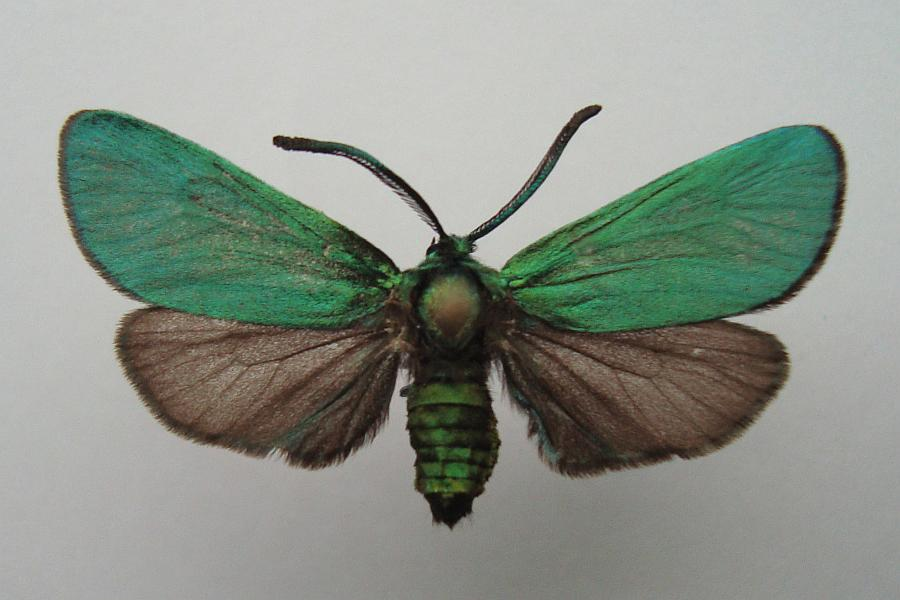

Scientific classification
- Kingdom: Animalia
- Phylum: Arthropoda
- Clade: Pancrustacea
- Class: Insecta
- Order: Lepidoptera
- Family: Zygaenidae
- Genus: Adscita
- Species: A. alpina

Binomial name
- Adscita alpina (Alberti, 1937)

Synonyms
- Procris alpina Alberti, 1937

= Adscita alpina =

Species of moth

Adscita alpina is a moth of the family Zygaenidae. It is found in Central Europe.

The wingspan is 20–30 mm. Adults are on wing from July to the beginning of September.

The larvae feed on Rumex species, including Rumex scutatus. Young larvae overwinter. Full-grown larvae can be found from May to the end June.
