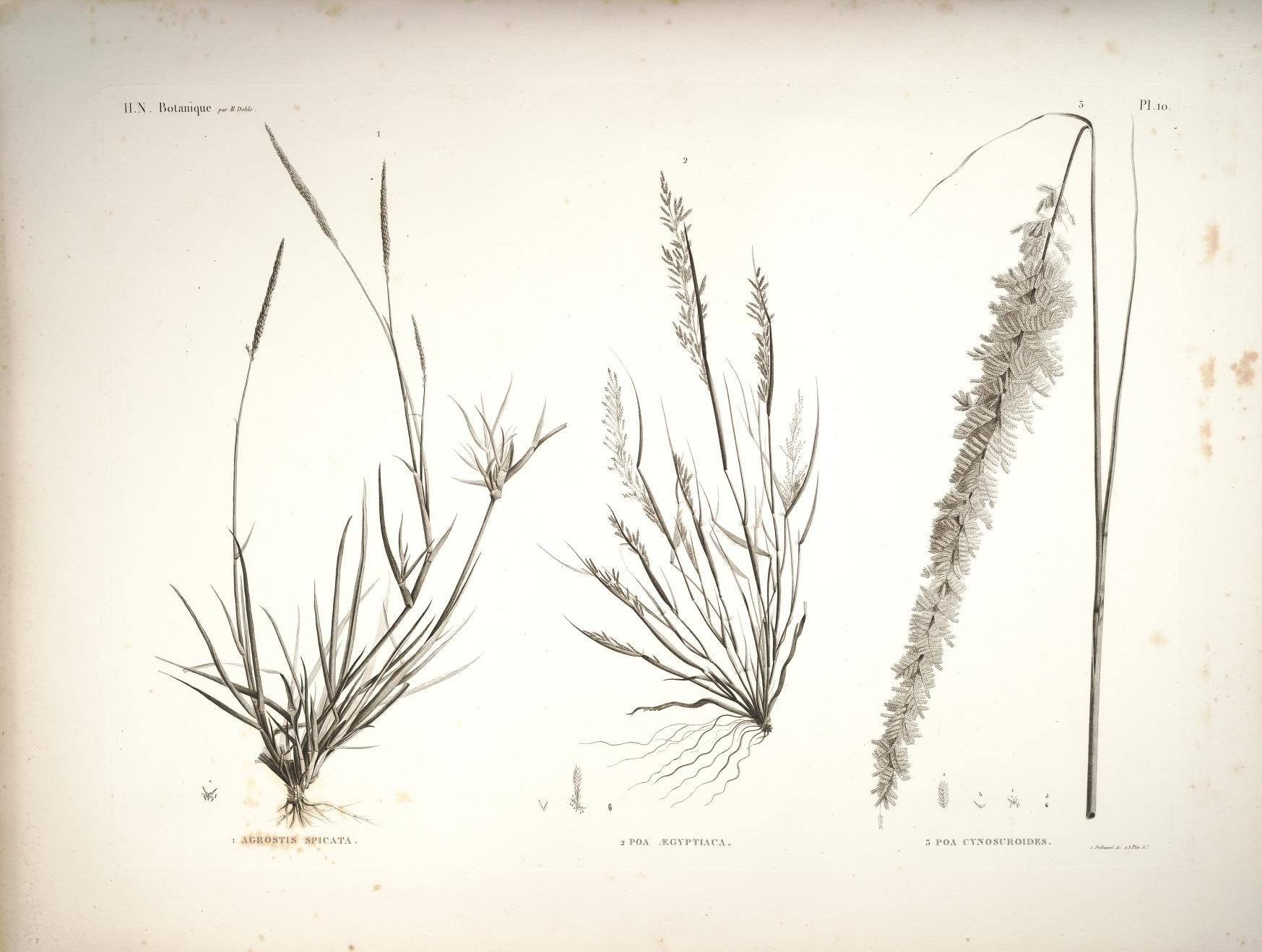
- Desmostachya bipinnata (right plant)

Conservation status
- Least Concern (IUCN 3.1)

Scientific classification
- Kingdom: Plantae
- Clade: Tracheophytes
- Clade: Angiosperms
- Clade: Monocots
- Clade: Commelinids
- Order: Poales
- Family: Poaceae
- Subfamily: Chloridoideae
- Genus: Desmostachya
- Species: D. bipinnata

Binomial name
- Desmostachya bipinnata (L.) Stapf

Synonyms
- Briza bipinnata L.; Cynosurus durus Forssk.; Dactylis interrupta Rottler ex Stapf; Desmostachya cynosuroides (Retz.) Stapf ex Massey; Desmostachya pingalaiae Raole & R.J.Desai; Dinebra dura Lag.; Eragrostis bipinnata (L.) K.Schum.; Eragrostis cynosuroides (Retz.) P.Beauv.; Eragrostis thunbergii Baill.; Leptochloa bipinnata (L.) Hochst.; Megastachya bipinnata (L.) P.Beauv.; Poa cynosuroides Retz.; Pogonarthria bipinnata (L.) Chiov.; Rabdochloa bipinnata (L.) Kuntze; Stapfiola bipinnata (L.) Kuntze; Uniola bipinnata (L.) L.

= Desmostachya bipinnata =

Species of grass

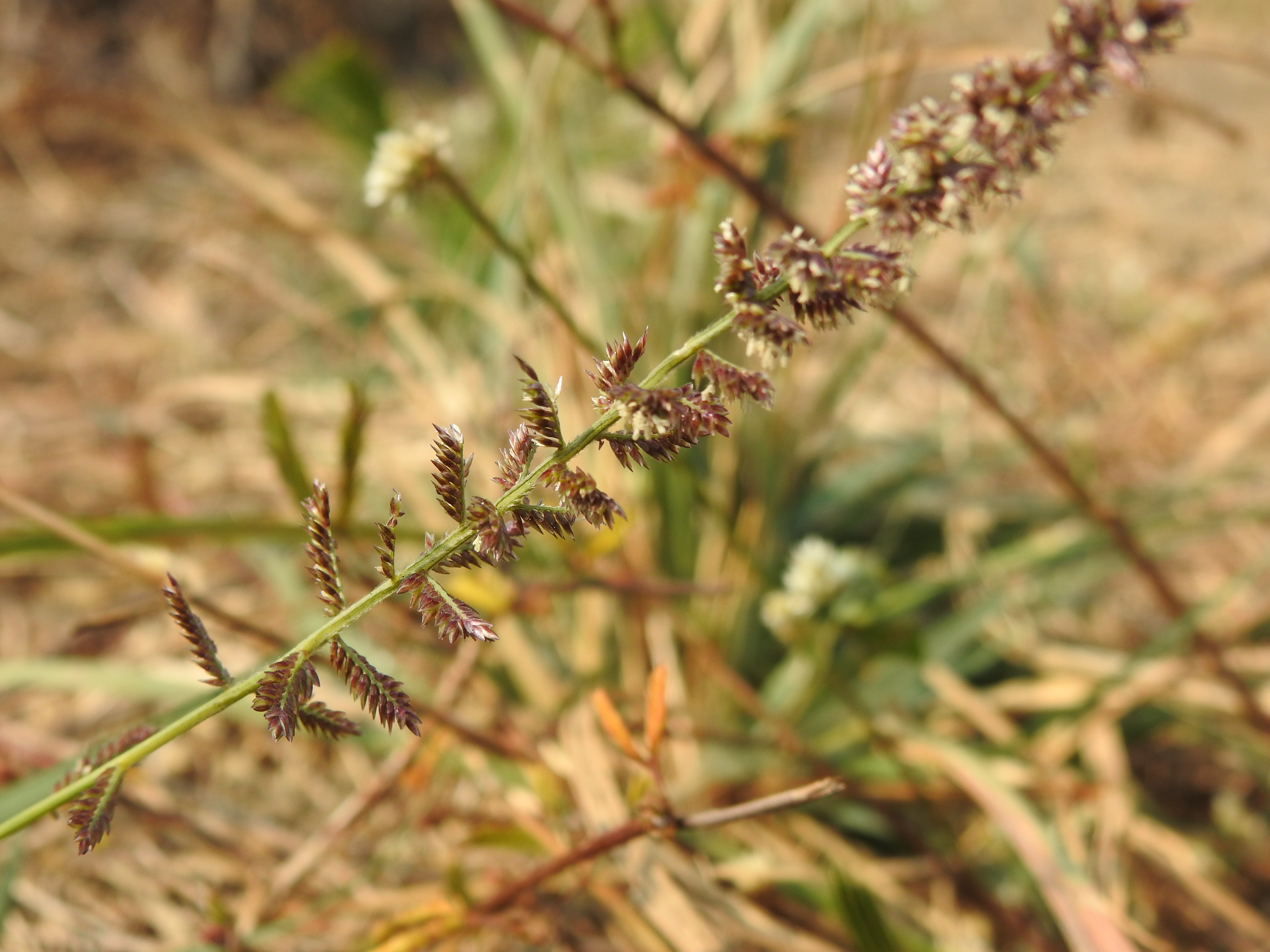
Desmostachya bipinnata (L.) Stapf, inflorescence.

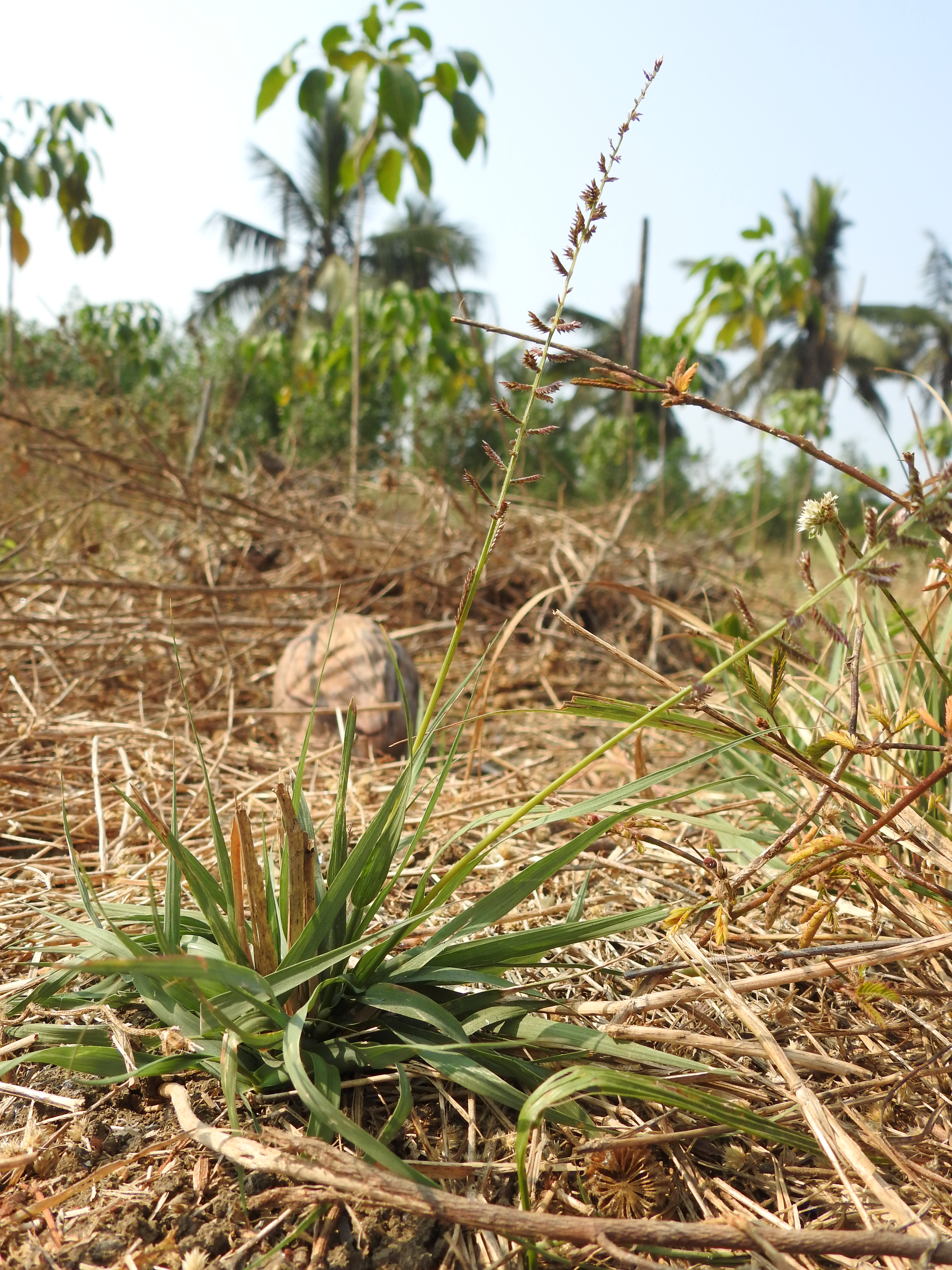
Desmostachya bipinnata (L.) Stapf

Desmostachya bipinnata, commonly known as halfa grass, big cordgrass, and salt reed-grass, is an Old World perennial grass, long known and used in human history. The grass is tall, tufted, leafy, perennial grass, branching from the base, erect from a stout creeping rootstock.

== Distribution ==
Desmostachya bipinnata is native to northeast and west tropical, and northern Africa (in Algeria, Chad, Egypt, Eritrea, Ethiopia, Libya, Mauritania, Somalia, Sudan, Tunisia); and countries in the Middle East, and temperate and tropical Asia (in Afghanistan, China, India, Iran, Iraq, Israel, Myanmar, Nepal, Pakistan, Saudi Arabia, Thailand).

In agriculture, Desmostachya bipinnata is a weed commonly found in wheat crops.

== Taxonomy ==
On the basis of distinct morphological and reproductive characters, four new subspecies of D. bipinnata have been described by Pandeya and Pandeya (2002). However, it is uncertain whether these subspecies represent actual genetic differences, the authors also note the existence of different biotypes occurring in response to soil and climatic conditions in western India. The four subspecies proposed are:

- D. bipinnata longispiculata;
- D. bipinnata jodhpurensis;
- D. bipinnata sheelai;
- D. bipinnata agraensis.

== Religious significance ==
Desmostachya bipinnata—darbha (दर्भः) or kuśa (कुशः) in Sanskrit—has long been used in various traditions (Hindus, Jains and Buddhists) as a very sacred plant. According to early Buddhist accounts, it was the material used by Buddha for his meditation seat when he attained enlightenment. It is mentioned in the Rig Veda for use in sacred ceremonies and also as a seat for priests and the gods. Kusha grass is specifically recommended by Krishna in the Bhagavad Gita as part of the ideal seat for meditation.

== Other uses ==
Rope made from this grass was found in the Khufu ship. As well as the usual uses for mooring etc., the rope had been used as part of the ship's construction and had held it together.

In folk medicine, Desmostachya bipinnata has been used to treat dysentery and menorrhagia, and as a diuretic.

In arid regions, Desmostachya bipinnata is used as fodder for livestock.
