= Leptocarydion =

Scientific classification
- Kingdom: Plantae
- Clade: Tracheophytes
- Clade: Angiosperms
- Clade: Monocots
- Clade: Commelinids
- Order: Poales
- Family: Poaceae
- Subfamily: Chloridoideae
- Tribe: Cynodonteae
- Subtribe: Hubbardochloinae
- Genus: Leptocarydion; Hochst. ex Stapf
- Species: L. vulpiastrum

Binomial name
- Leptocarydion vulpiastrum (De Not.) Stapf

Synonyms
- Leptocarydium Hochst. ex Stapf alternate spelling; Diplachne alopecuroides (Hochst. ex Steud.) Eyles; Diplachne vulpiastrum (De Not.) Schweinf.; Leptocarydion alopecuroides (Hochst. ex Steud.) Stapf; Leptochloa plumosa Andersson; Rabdochloa vulpiastrum De Not.; Sieglingia plumosa (Andersson) Kuntze; Triodia plumosa (Andersson) Benth.; Triodia vulpiastrum (De Not.) K.Schum.; Uralepis alopecuroides Hochst. ex Steud.

Genus of flowering plants

Leptocarydion is a genus of African and Arabic plants in the grass family.

Species

The only known species is Leptocarydion vulpiastrum, native to Africa from Eritrea to KwaZulu-Natal, plus Yemen and Madagascar.
