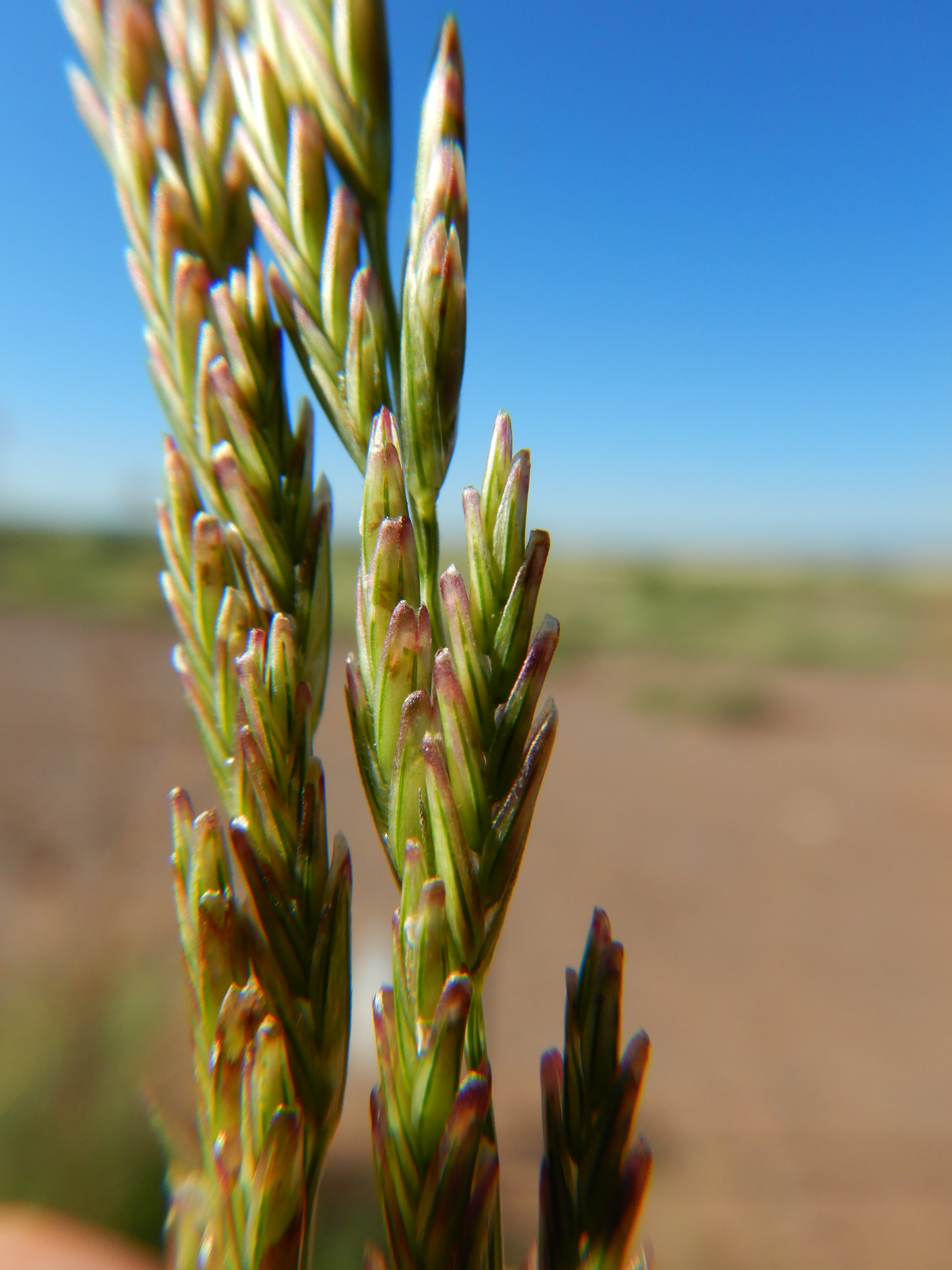
- Disakisperma dubium

Scientific classification
- Kingdom: Plantae
- Clade: Tracheophytes
- Clade: Angiosperms
- Clade: Monocots
- Clade: Commelinids
- Order: Poales
- Family: Poaceae
- Subfamily: Chloridoideae
- Tribe: Cynodonteae
- Subtribe: Eleusininae
- Genus: Disakisperma; Steud.

Type species
- Disakisperma mexicanum (syn. of D. dubium) Steud.

Synonyms
- Ipnum Phil.

= Disakisperma =

Genus of flowering plants

Disakisperma is a genus of plants in the grass family, native to North and South America, Africa, and the Arabian Peninsula.

Species

- Disakisperma dubium (Kunth) P.M.Peterson & N.Snow - Mexico, Honduras, South America (Bolivia, Brazil, Argentina, Peru, Ecuador, Colombia), United States (Arizona, New Mexico, Texas, Florida)
- Disakisperma eleusine (Nees) P.M.Peterson & N.Snow - South Africa, Mozambique, Lesotho, Eswatini, Namibia, Botswana
- Disakisperma obtusiflorum (Hochst.) P.M.Peterson & N.Snow - Zaire, Burundi, Kenya, Uganda, Tanzania, Burundi, Angola, Sudan, South Sudan, Somalia, Ethiopia, Eritrea, Saudi Arabia, Yemen
- Disakisperma yemenicum (Schweinf.) P.M. Peterson & N. Snow - Yemen, Eritrea
