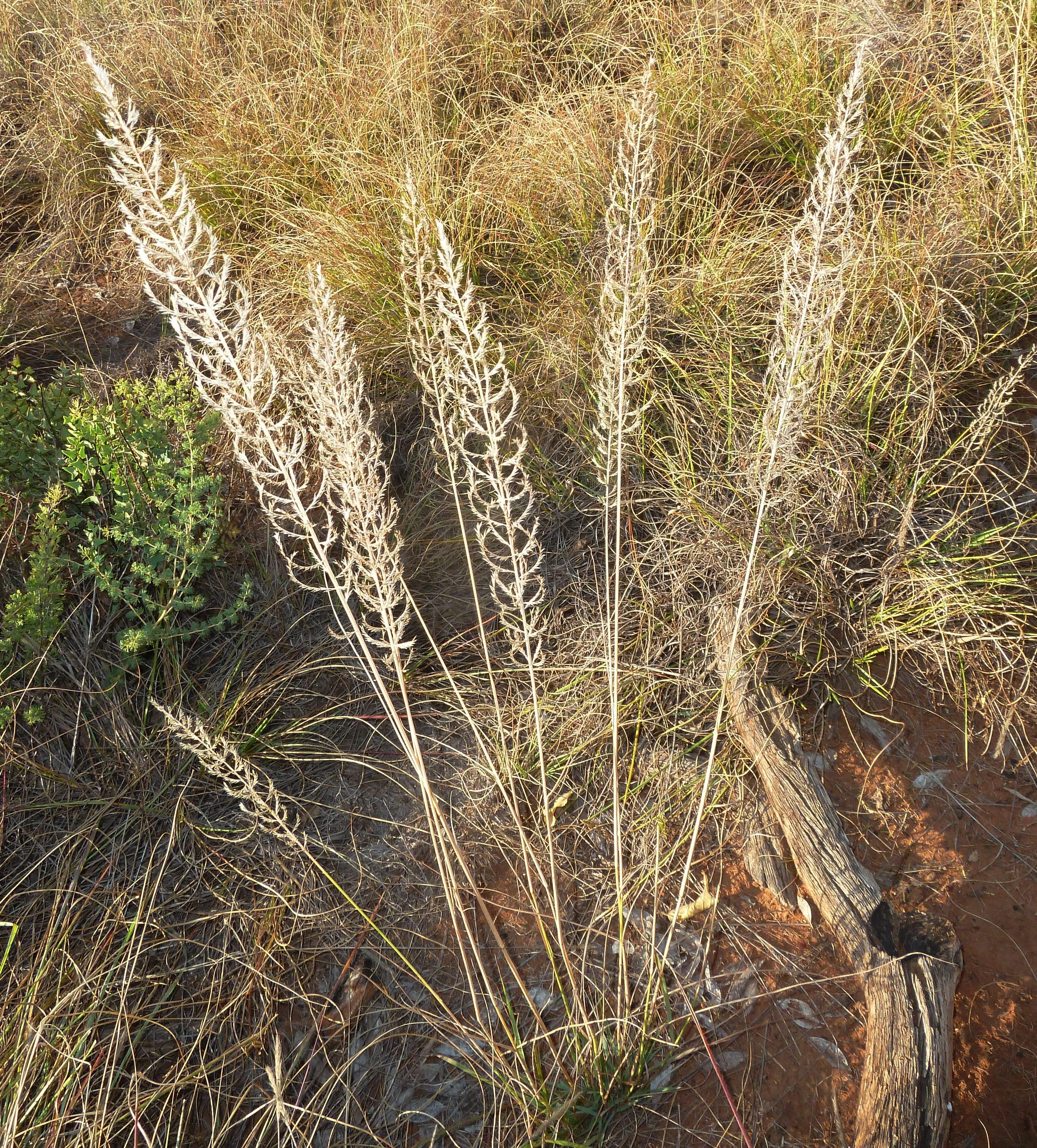

Scientific classification
- Kingdom: Plantae
- Clade: Tracheophytes
- Clade: Angiosperms
- Clade: Monocots
- Clade: Commelinids
- Order: Poales
- Family: Poaceae
- Subfamily: Chloridoideae
- Genus: Pogonarthria
- Species: P. squarrosa

Binomial name
- Pogonarthria squarrosa (Roem. & Schult.) Pilg.

Synonyms
- Pogonarthria orthoclada Peter Pogonarthria menyharthii (Hack.) Hack. Pogonarthria hackelii Chiov. Pogonarthria falcata (Hack.) Rendle Poa squarrosa Licht. Melica festucoides Licht. Leptochloa marlothii Hack. ex Dyer Leptochloa falcata Hack. Eragrostis marlothii Hack. Diplachne menyharthii Hack.

= Pogonarthria squarrosa =

Species of grass

Pogonarthria squarrosa, the sickle grass or cross grass, is a species of perennial grass that is native to tropical, East and southern Africa. It is a hard and unpalatable pioneer grass with very low grazing value.
