= Anders Jahan Retzius =

Swedish naturalist, botany, chemist (1742–1821)

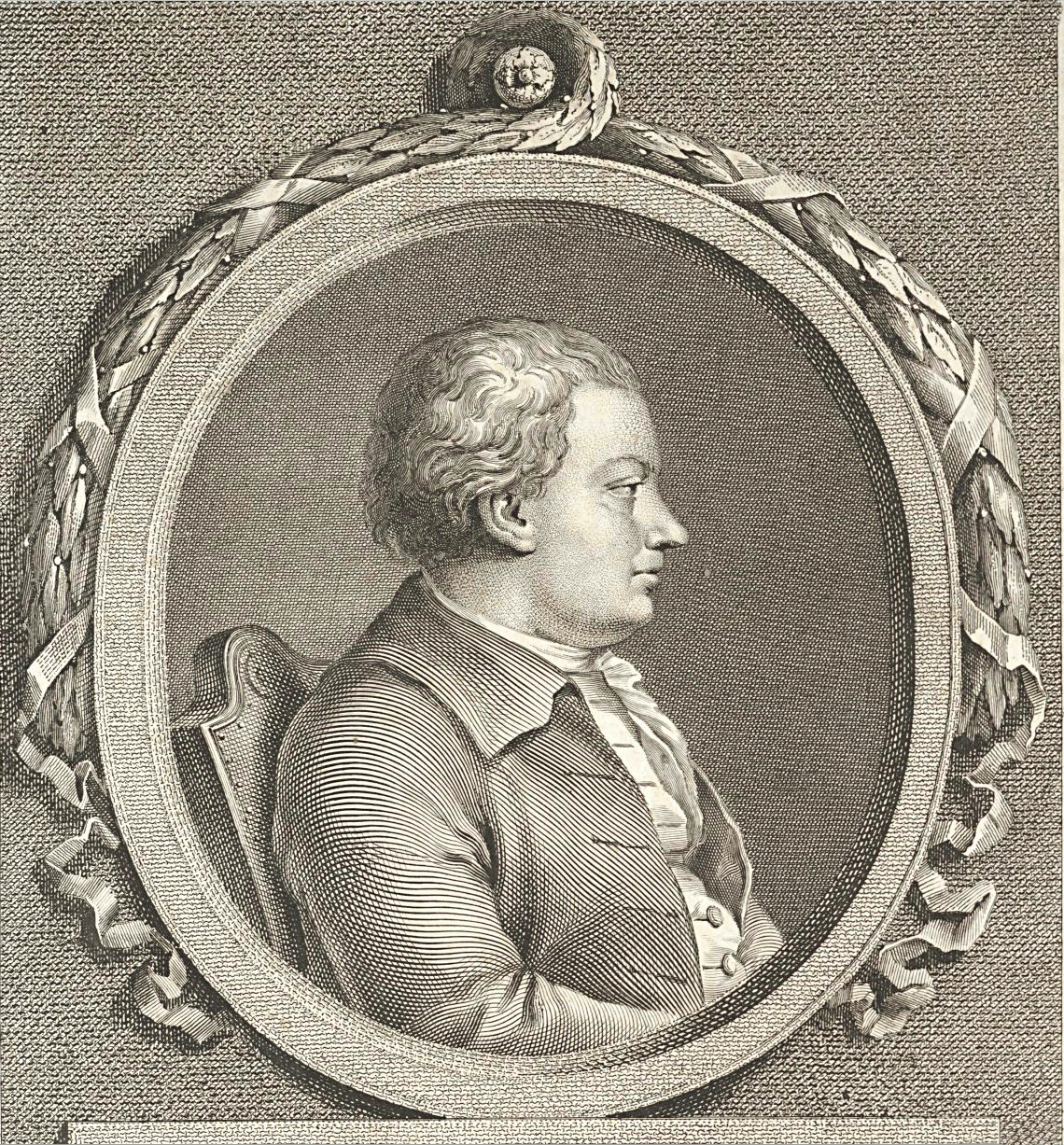
- Retzius on the cover of one of his books
- Born: 3 October 1742; Kristianstad, Skåne County), Sweden
- Died: 6 October 1821 (aged 79); Stockholm, Sweden
- Education: Lund University
- Scientific career
- Fields: Chemistry; Botany; Entomology
- Author abbrev. (botany): Retz.
- Author abbrev. (zoology): Retzius

Anders Jahan Retzius (3 October 1742 – 6 October 1821) was a Swedish chemist, botanist and entomologist.

== Biography ==
Born in Kristianstad, he matriculated at Lund University in 1758, where he graduated as a filosofie magister in 1766. He also trained as an apothecary apprentice. He received the position of docent of chemistry at Lund in 1766, and of natural history in 1767. He became extraordinary professor of natural history in 1777, and thereafter held various chairs of natural history, economy and chemistry until his retirement in 1812. He died in Stockholm on 6 October 1821.

He described many new species of insects and did fundamental work on their classification.

Retzius was elected a member of the Royal Swedish Academy of Sciences in 1782.

He was the father of Anders Retzius and grandfather of Gustaf Retzius. Disciples of Anders Jahan Retzius include the botanist Carl Adolph Agardh, the zoologist and archaeologist Sven Nilsson, the botanist and entomologist Carl Fredrik Fallén, and the entomologist Johan Wilhelm Zetterstedt. He was also an influence on the botanist Elias Fries who arrived in Lund by the time Retzius was already an old man.

== Selected works ==
- Primae Lineae pharmaciae : in usum praelectionum Suecico idiomate . Dieterich, Gottingae 1771 Digital edition by the University and State Library Düsseldorf
- Inledning till djur-riket : efter herr archiatern och riddaren Carl von Linnés lärogrunder (1772)
- Observationes botanicae (1778–91)
- Floræ Scandinaviæ prodromus; enumerans: plantas Sveciae, Lapponiae, Finlandiae, Pomeraniae, Daniae, Norvegiae, Holsatiae, Islandiae & Groenlandiae (Holmiæ 1779; 2nd edition (1795)
- (edited and revised:) Charles De Geer, Genera et species insectorum, e generosissimi auctoris scriptis extraxit, digessit, quoad portem reddidit, et terminologiam insectorum Linneanam addidit (1783)
- Lectiones publicæ de vermibus intestinalibus (1784)
- Försök til mineral-rikets upställning. (1795)
- (edited and revised:) Carl Linnaeus, Faunae Svecicae a C à Linné inchoatae pars prima sistens mammalia, aves, amphibia et pisces Sueciae quam recognovit, emendavit et auxit (1800).
- Försök til en Flora Oeconomica Sveciae, eller swenska wäxters nytta och skada i hushållningen (1806–07)
