= Victory III =

Cruise ship to tour St. Augustine

Class overview
- Operators: St. Augustine Scenic Cruise
- Built: 1973 or later
- In commission: ca. 1973 to present

History
- Name: Victory III
- Completed: ca. 1973
- Fate: built to conduct scenic tours of Matanzas Bay

General characteristics
- Type: tour boat
- Length: 60 ft 0 in (18.3 m)
- Beam: 20 ft 0 in (6.1 m)
- Complement: 3

The Victory III is the boat on which the St. Augustine Scenic Cruise is conducted. The boat is berthed at the St. Augustine Public Marina, which is in downtown St. Augustine, Florida. The Scenic Cruise and the Victory III are property of the Usina family. The Usinas have had a boat service since 1900. The scenic tour and other excursions have been conducted in St. Augustine since before World War I. The Victory and the Victory II preceded the current boat.

The Victory III takes tourists on an hour-and-fifteen-minute tour of Matanzas Bay, which is St. Augustine's waterfront. The boat passes by the St. Augustine Lighthouse, in a bay known as Salt Run. The boat captain narrates the cruise, pointing out local sites. The Scenic Cruise website says the cruise is conducted four to five times a day every day of the year except American Thanksgiving and Christmas. The boat has restrooms and snacks for purchase available for the tours.

The boat itself has two decks. The lower deck is mostly inside and protected from the weather, although a section in the bow is covered but open on the sides. The upper deck is completely open, with no roof. The wheelhouse is on the upper deck in the bow section. It is completely protected from the weather, being completely enclosed.

The Trip Advisor website, as of August 2017, had 49 reviews of the cruise and rates an average of four-and-a-half out of five stars. Out of 124 reviews on Facebook, the cruise receives 4.7 stars.
