= St. Augustine, Florida =

St. Augustine San Agustín (Spanish)
- City
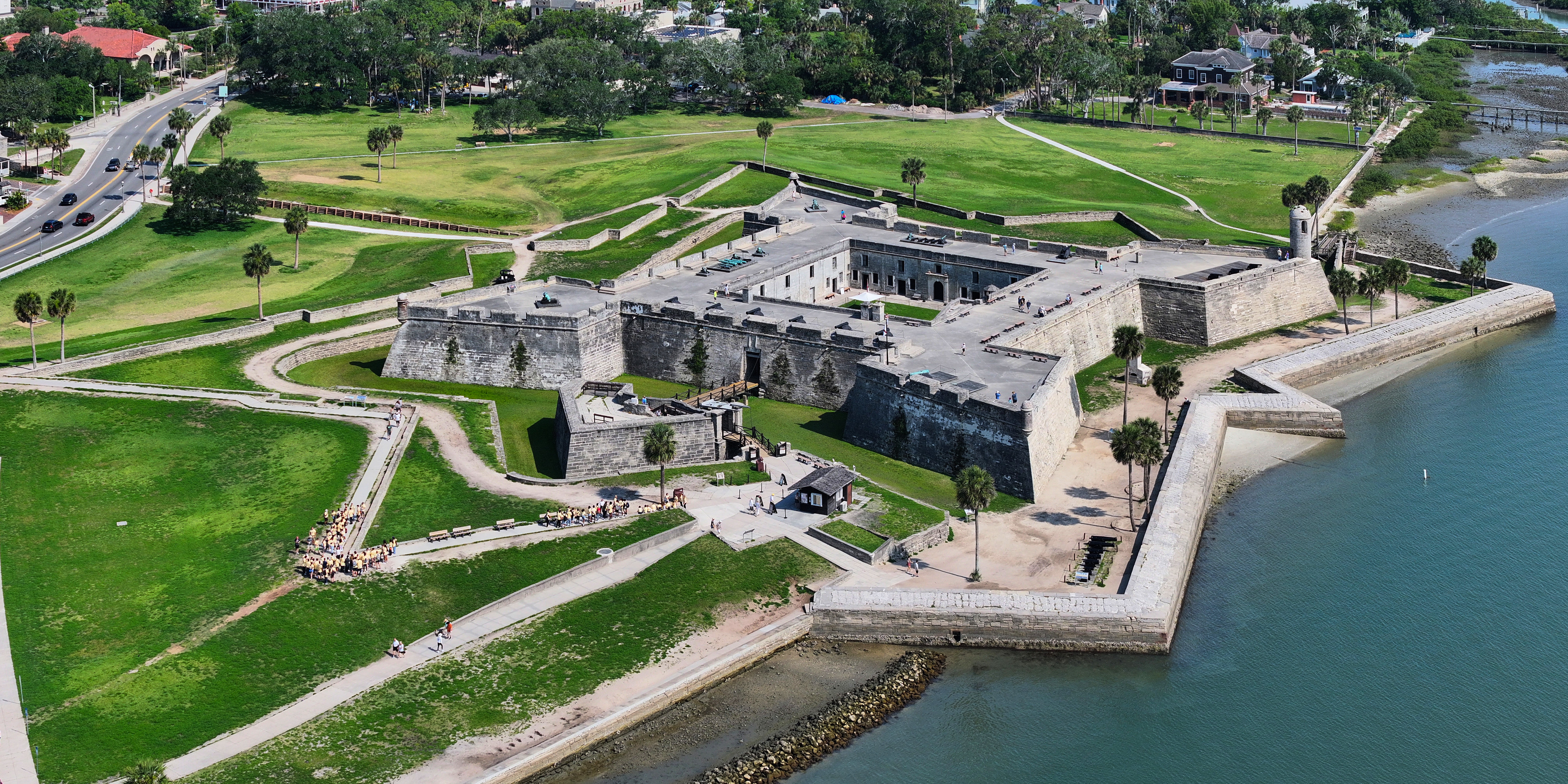
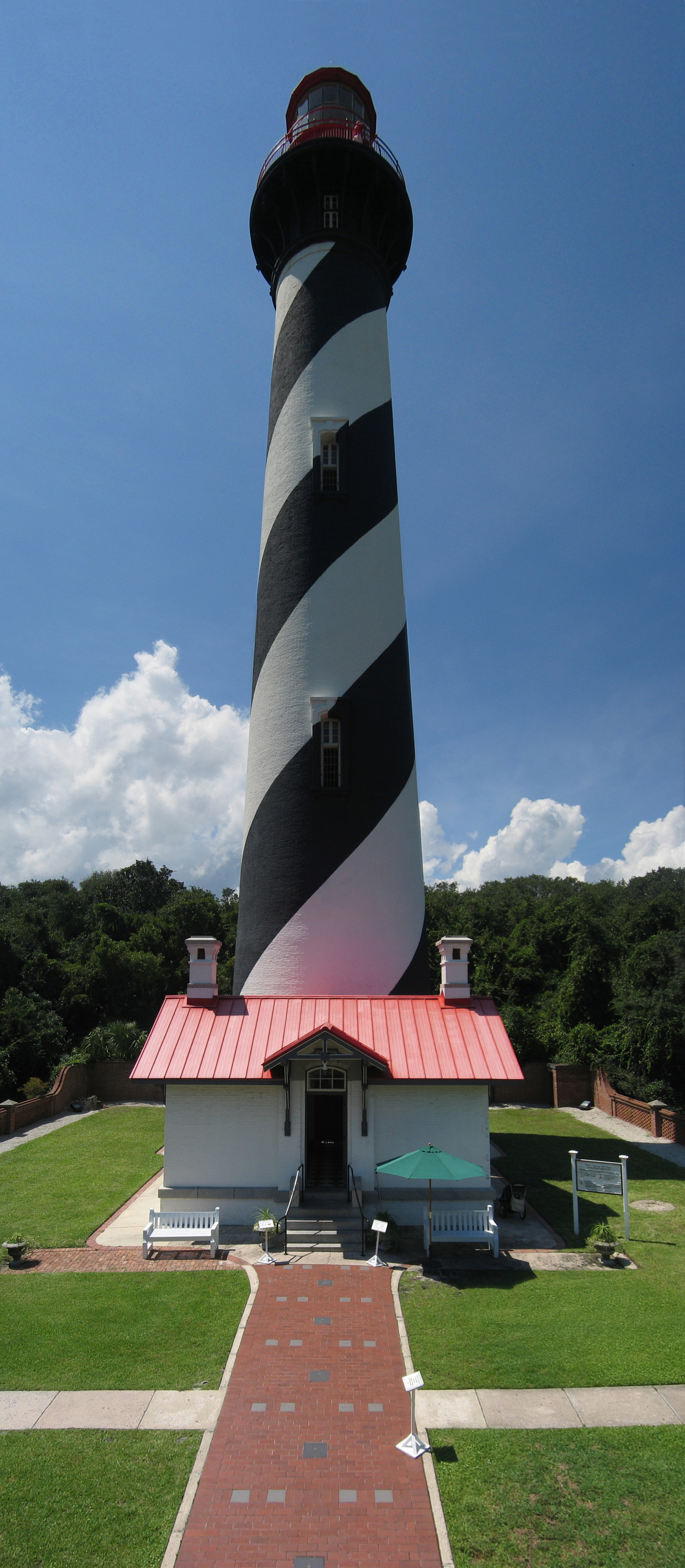
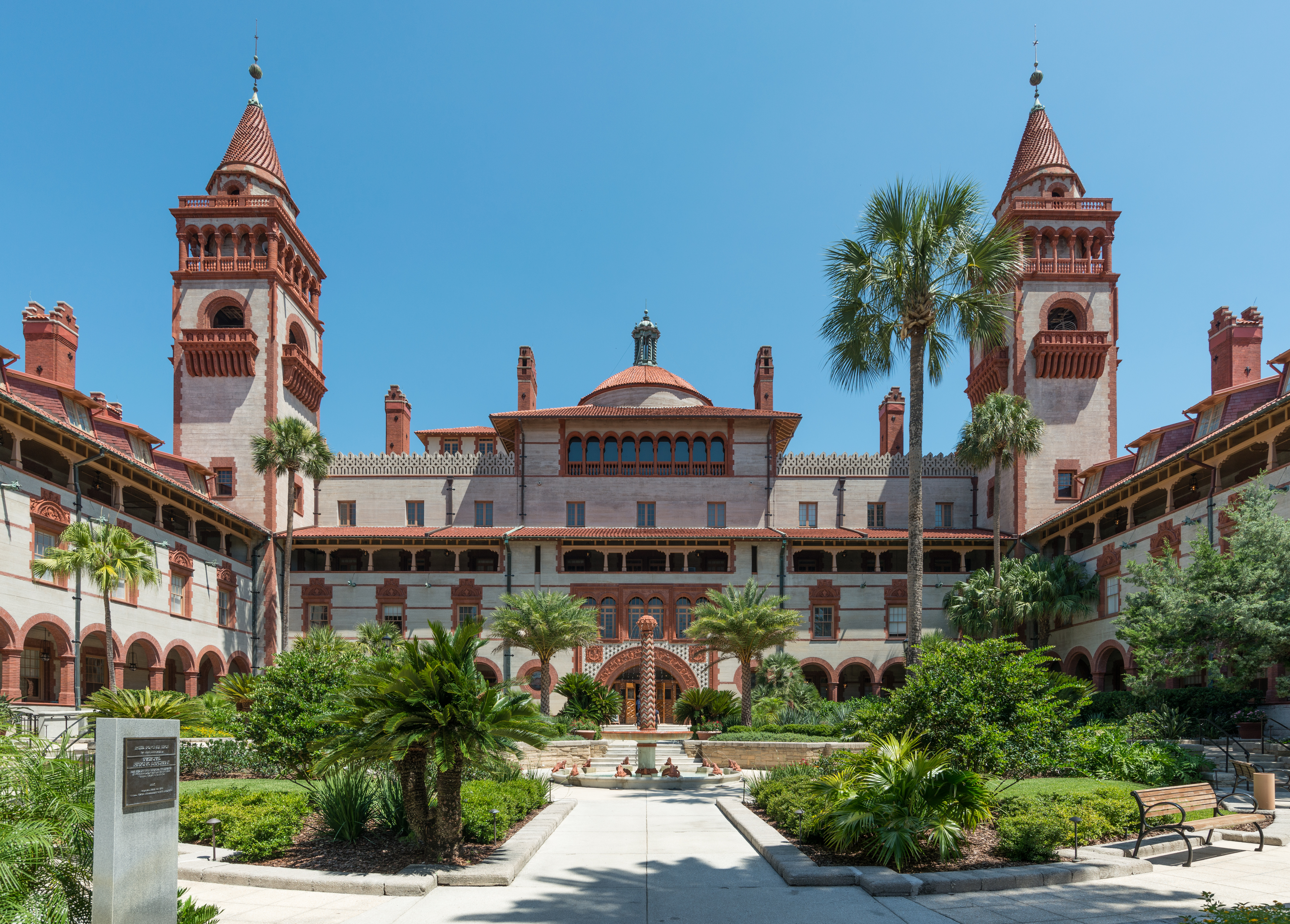
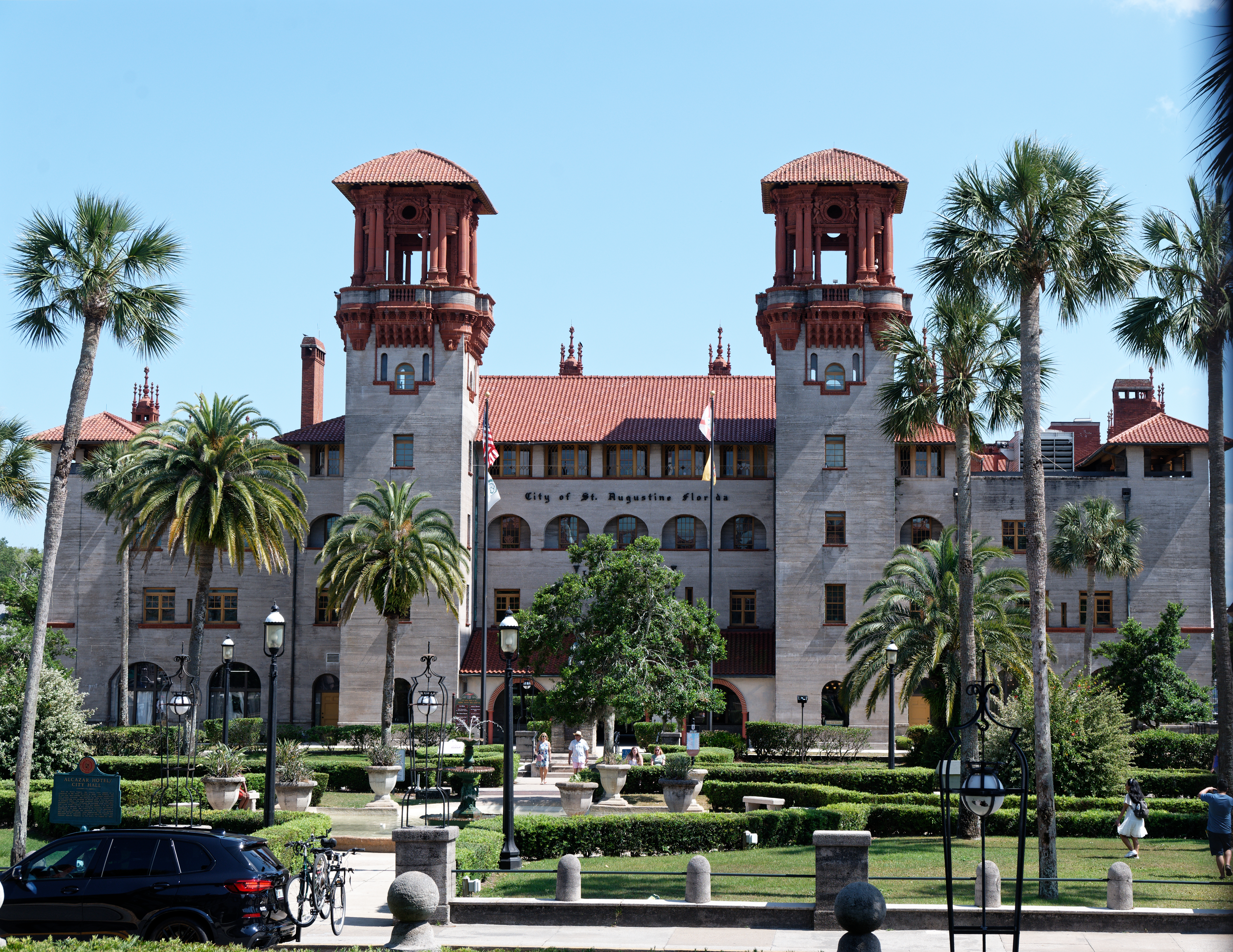
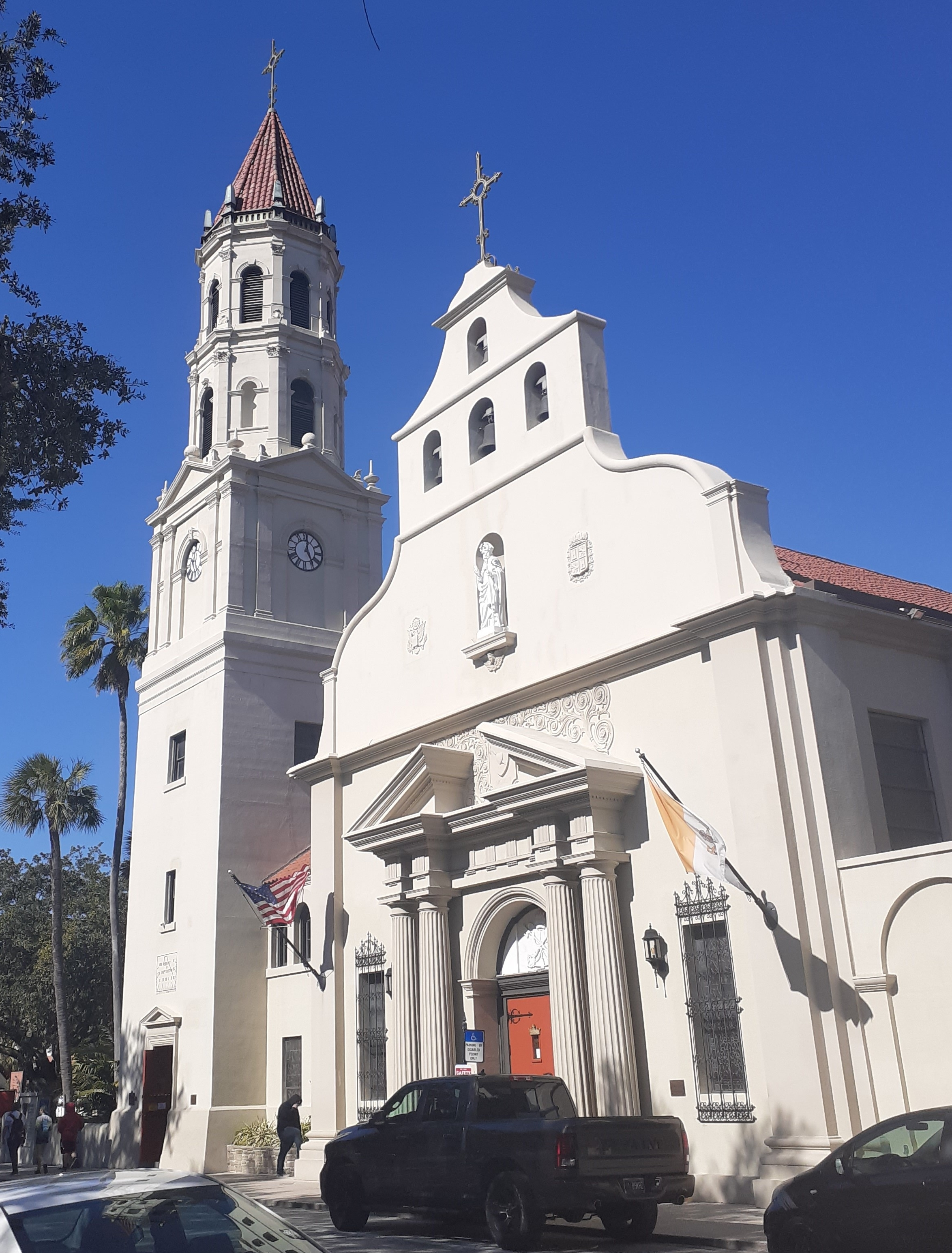
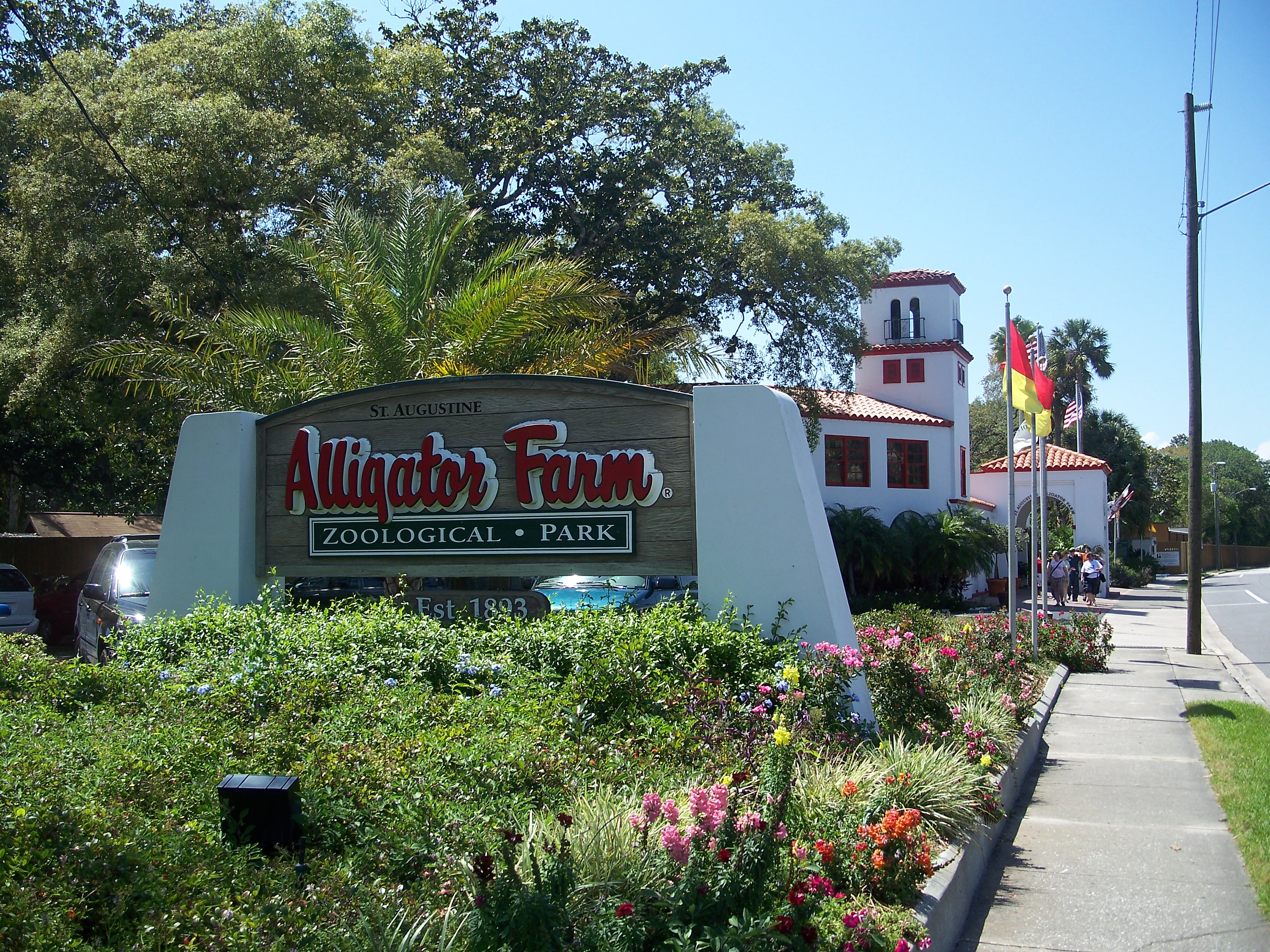
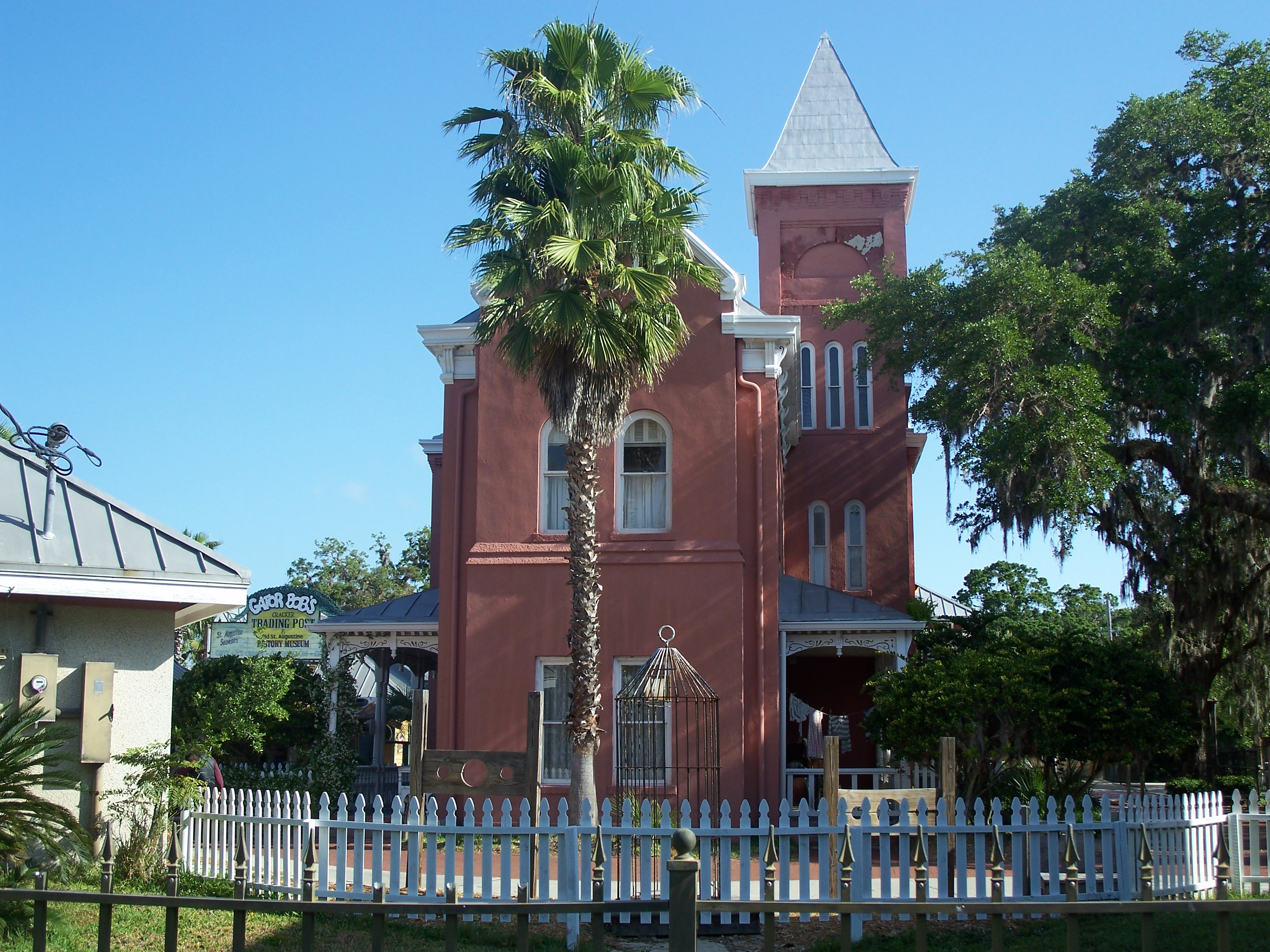
- Castillo de San Marcos St. Augustine Light Flagler College Lightner Museum Cathedral Basilica of St. Augustine St. Augustine Alligator Farm Zoological Park Old St. Johns County Jail

- Coat of arms
- Nicknames: Ancient City, Old City
- Location in St. Johns County and the U.S. state of Florida

- Location in the United States
- Coordinates: 29°53′21″N 81°18′15″W
- Country: United States
- State: Florida
- County: St. Johns
- Established: September 8, 1565; 461 years ago
- Founder: Pedro Menéndez de Avilés
- Named for: Saint Augustine of Hippo

Government
  - Type: Commissioner–manager

Area
  - City: 12.85 sq mi (33.29 km^{2})
  - Land: 9.52 sq mi (24.66 km^{2})
  - Water: 3.33 sq mi (8.63 km^{2})
- Elevation: 0 ft (0 m)

Population (2020)
  - City: 14,329
  - Density: 1,504.9/sq mi (581.05/km^{2})
  - Urban: 91,786
- Time zone: UTC−5 (EST)
  - Summer (DST): UTC−4 (EDT)
- ZIP Codes: 32080, 32084, 32085, 32086, 32095, 32082, 32092
- Area codes: 904, 324
- FIPS code: 12-62500
- GNIS feature ID: 2405389
- Website: www.citystaug.com

St. Augustine or Saint Augustine is a city in and the county seat of St. Johns County, Florida, United States. Located 40 miles (64 km) south of downtown Jacksonville, the city is on the Atlantic coast of northeastern Florida. Founded in 1565 by Spanish settlers, it is the oldest continuously inhabited European-established settlement in what is now the contiguous United States.

St. Augustine was founded on September 8, 1565, by Spanish admiral Pedro Menéndez de Avilés, Florida's first governor. He named the settlement San Agustín, because his ships bearing settlers, troops, and supplies from Spain had first sighted land in Florida eleven days earlier on August 28, the feast day of St. Augustine. The city served as the capital of Spanish Florida for over 200 years. It became the capital of British East Florida in 1763 and continued as the capital after the 1783 Treaty of Versailles in the Second Spanish Period.

Spain ceded Florida to the United States in 1819, and St. Augustine was designated one of the two alternating capitals of the Florida Territory, the other being Pensacola, upon ratification of the Adams–Onís Treaty in 1821. The Florida National Guard made the city its headquarters that same year. The territorial government moved and made Tallahassee the permanent capital of Florida in 1824.

St. Augustine is part of Florida's First Coast region and the Jacksonville metropolitan area. It had a population of 14,329 at the 2020 census, up from 12,975 at the 2010 census. Since the late 19th century, St. Augustine's distinctive historical character has made the city a tourist attraction. Castillo de San Marcos, the city's 17th-century Spanish fort, continues to attract tourists. St. George Street is a major pedestrian street that runs through the downtown area and includes over 30 historic houses and tourist attractions.

== History ==
=== Early exploration ===
Before the Spanish arrived in 1565, the area of St. Augustine was inhabited by the Timucua, who lived in villages along the St. Johns River. They farmed, fished, hunted, and maintained trade networks with neighboring groups. Their social structures included hereditary chiefs and organized ceremonies.

The first European known to have explored the coasts of Florida was the Spanish explorer and governor of Puerto Rico Juan Ponce de León, who likely ventured in 1513 as far north as the vicinity of the future St. Augustine. He named the peninsula, which he believed to be an island, La Florida and claimed it for the Spanish crown.

=== Founding by Pedro Menéndez de Avilés ===
Founded in 1565 by the Spanish conquistador Pedro Menéndez de Avilés, St. Augustine is the oldest continuously occupied settlement of European origin in the contiguous United States. It is the oldest continuously inhabited city of European origin in the United States. (Note: Second oldest under United States sovereignty, with the oldest being San Juan, Puerto Rico.)

In 1560, King Philip II of Spain appointed Menéndez as Captain General, and his brother Bartolomé Menéndez as Admiral, of the Fleet of the Indies. Thus Pedro Menéndez commanded the galleons of the great Armada de la Carrera, or Spanish Treasure Fleet, on their voyage from the Caribbean and Mexico to Spain, and determined the routes they followed.

In early 1564, he asked permission to go to Florida to search for La Concepcion, the galeon Capitana, or flagship, of the New Spain fleet commanded by his son, Admiral Juan Menéndez. The ship had been lost in September 1563 when a hurricane scattered the fleet as it was returning to Spain, at the latitude of Bermuda off the coast of South Carolina. The Crown repeatedly refused his request.

The Crown eventually approached Menéndez to fit out an expedition to Florida on the condition that he explore and settle the region as King Philip's adelantado, and eliminate the Huguenot French, whom the Catholic Spanish considered to be dangerous heretics.

Menéndez was in a race to reach Florida before the French captain Jean Ribault, who was on a mission to secure Fort Caroline. On August 28, 1565, the feast day of St. Augustine of Hippo, Menéndez's crew finally sighted land; the Spaniards continued sailing northward along the coast from their landfall, investigating every inlet and plume of smoke along the shore. On September 4, they encountered four French vessels anchored at the mouth of a large river (the St. Johns), including Ribault's flagship, La Trinité. The two fleets met in a brief skirmish, but it was not decisive. Menéndez sailed southward and landed again on September 8, formally declared possession of the land in the name of Philip II, and officially founded the settlement he named San Agustín (Saint Augustine). Father Francisco López de Mendoza Grajales, the chaplain of the expedition, celebrated the first Thanksgiving Mass on the grounds. The formal Franciscan outpost, Mission Nombre de Dios, was founded at the landing point, perhaps the first mission in what would become the continental United States.

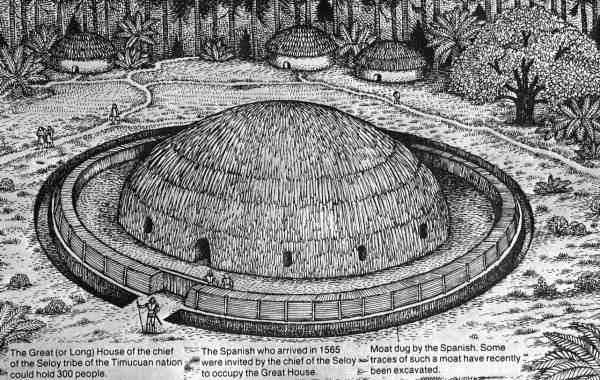
Pedro Menéndez de Avilés moved his settlers to the village of the Seloy tribe of the Timucua. Their chief gave them the Great House, a structure able to hold several hundred people. Around this meeting house the Spanish dug a moat and added fortifications.

The mission served nearby villages of the Mocama, a Timucua group, and was at the center of an important chiefdom in the late 16th and 17th century. The settlement was built in the former Timucua village of Seloy; this site was chosen for its strategic location facing the waterways of St. Augustine bay with their abundant resources, an eminently suitable site for water communications and defense.

A French attack on St. Augustine was thwarted by a violent squall that ravaged the French naval forces. Taking advantage of this, Menéndez marched his troops overland to Fort Caroline on the St. Johns River, about 30 miles (50 km) north. The Spanish easily overwhelmed the lightly defended French garrison, which had been left with only a skeleton crew of 20 soldiers and about 100 others, killing most of the men and sparing about 60 women and children. The bodies of the victims were hung in trees with the inscription: "Hanged, not as Frenchmen, but as "Lutherans" (heretics)". Menéndez renamed the fort San Mateo and marched back to St. Augustine, where he discovered that the shipwrecked survivors from the French ships had come ashore to the south of the settlement. A Spanish patrol encountered the remnants of the French force, and took them prisoner. Menéndez accepted their surrender, but then executed all of them except a few professing Catholics and some Protestant workers with useful skills, at what is now known as Matanzas Inlet (Matanzas is Spanish for "slaughters"). The site is very near the national monument Fort Matanzas, built in 1740–1742 by the Spanish.

=== Invasions by pirates and enemies of Spain ===
Succeeding governors of the province maintained a peaceful coexistence with the local Native Americans, allowing the isolated outpost of St. Augustine some stability for a few years. On May 28 and 29, 1586, soon after the Anglo-Spanish War began between England and Spain, the English privateer Sir Francis Drake sacked and burned St. Augustine. The approach of his large fleet obliged Governor Pedro Menéndez Márquez and the townspeople to evacuate the settlement. When the English got ashore, they seized some artillery pieces and a royal strongbox containing gold ducats (which was the garrison payroll). The killing of their sergeant major by the Spanish rearguard caused Drake to order the town razed to the ground.

In 1609 and 1611, expeditions were sent out from St. Augustine against the English colony at Jamestown. In the second half of the 17th century, groups of Indians from the colony of Carolina conducted raids into Florida and killed the Franciscan priests who served at the Catholic missions. Requests by successive governors of the province to strengthen the presidio's garrison and fortifications were ignored by the Spanish Crown which had other priorities in its vast empire. The charter of 1663 for the new Province of Carolina, issued by King Charles II of England, was revised in 1665, claiming lands as far southward as 29 degrees north latitude, about 65 miles south of the existing settlement at St. Augustine.

The English buccaneer Robert Searle sacked St. Augustine in 1668, after capturing some Spanish supply vessels bound for the settlement and holding their crews at gun point while his men hid below decks. Searle was retaliating for the Spanish destruction of the settlement of New Providence in the Bahamas. Searle and his men killed sixty people and pillaged public storehouses, churches and houses. This raid and the establishment of the English settlement at Charles Town spurred the Spanish Crown to finally acknowledge the vulnerability of St. Augustine to foreign incursions and strengthen the city's defenses. In 1669, Queen Regent Mariana ordered the Viceroy of New Spain to disburse funds for the construction of a permanent masonry fortress, which began in 1672. Before the fortress was completed, French buccaneers Michel de Grammont and Nicolas Brigaut planned an ill-fated attack in 1686 which was foiled: their ships were run aground, Grammont and his crew were lost at sea, and Brigaut was captured ashore by Spanish soldiers. The Castillo de San Marcos was completed in 1695, not long before an attack by James Moore's forces from Carolina in November, 1702. Failing to capture the fort after a siege of 58 days, the British set St. Augustine ablaze as they retreated. The building of a sea wall in St. Augustine was initiated by the Spanish government in the 1690s, for which laborers burned lime and quarried coquina while the final blocks of the Castillo de San Marcos were being laid in 1695. It took ten years to build. The seawall later became a critical part of the city's waterfront defense against tidal flooding and shoreline erosion.

In 1738, the governor of Spanish Florida, Manuel de Montiano, ordered a settlement be constructed two miles north of St. Augustine for the growing Free Black community established by fugitive slaves who had escaped into Florida from the Thirteen Colonies. This new community, Fort Mose, would serve as a military outpost and buffer for St. Augustine, as the men accepted into Fort Mose had enlisted in the Florida militia and converted to Catholicism in exchange for their freedom. Fort Mose was the first legally recognized free Black settlement in what is now the United States. Archaeological evidence shows the layout of homes and fortifications, highlighting the community’s resilience.

In 1740, however, St. Augustine was again besieged, this time by the governor of the British colony of Georgia, General James Oglethorpe, who was also unable to take the fort.

=== Loyalist haven under British Period ===
The 1763 Treaty of Paris, signed after Great Britain's victory over France and Spain during the Seven Years' War, ceded Florida to Great Britain in exchange for the return of Havana and Manila. Many Spanish settlers in the region left Florida for Cuba and, because of the political sympathies of its British inhabitants, St. Augustine became a Loyalist haven during the American Revolutionary War.

After the mass exodus of St. Augustinians, Great Britain sought to repopulate its new territory. The London Board of Trade advertised 20,000-acre lots to any group that would settle in Florida within ten years, with one resident per 100 acres. Pioneers who were "energetic and of good character" were given 100 acres of land and 50 additional acres for each family member they brought. Under Governor James Grant, almost three million acres of land were granted in East Florida alone. Second stories were added to existing Spanish homes and new houses were built. Cattle ranching and plantation agriculture began to thrive.

During the 20-year British period, Britain took command of both the Castillo de San Marcos (renamed Fort St. Mark) and of Fort Matanzas. They permanently stationed a small group of men at Fort Matanzas. Once war broke out, loyalist St. Augustine residents burned effigies of Patriots Samuel Adams and John Hancock in the plaza. Fort St. Mark became a training and supply base, as well as a prisoner-of-war camp where three signers of the Declaration of Independence and South Carolina's lieutenant governor Christopher Gadsden were held. Local militias composed of Florida, Georgia, and Carolina inhabitants formed the East Florida Rangers in 1776 and were reorganized to form the King's Rangers in 1779. Spanish General Bernardo de Gálvez, harassed the British in West Florida and captured Pensacola. Fears that the Spanish would then move to capture St. Augustine, however, proved unfounded.

The 1783 Treaty of Paris, which recognized the independence of the Thirteen Colonies as the United States, ceded Florida back to Spain and returned the Bahamas to Britain. As a result, some of the town's Spanish residents returned to St Augustine. Refugees from Dr. Andrew Turnbull's troubled settlement in New Smyrna had fled to St. Augustine in 1777, made up the majority of the city's population during British period, and remained when the Spanish Crown took control again. This group was, and still is, referred to locally as "Menorcans", even though it also included settlers from Italy, Corsica and the Greek islands.

=== Second Spanish period ===
During the Second Spanish period (1784–1821) of Florida, Spain was dealing with invasions of the Iberian peninsula by Napoleon's armies in the Peninsular War, and struggled to maintain a tenuous hold on its territories in the western hemisphere as revolution swept South America. The royal administration of Florida was neglected, as the province had long been regarded as an unprofitable backwater by the Crown. The United States, however, considered Florida vital to its political and military interests as it expanded its territory in North America, and maneuvered by sometimes clandestine means to acquire it. On October 5, 1811, a hurricane hit St. Augustine that caused extensive damage to the city. The damage was further exacerbated by the economic situation of Spanish Florida. The Adams–Onís Treaty, negotiated in 1819 and ratified in 1821, ceded Florida and St. Augustine, still its capital at the time, to the United States.

=== Territory of Florida ===
According to the Adams–Onís Treaty, the United States acquired East Florida and absolved Spain of $5 million of debt. Spain renounced all claims to West Florida and the Oregon Country. Andrew Jackson returned to Florida in 1821, upon ratification of the treaty, and established a new territorial government. Americans from older plantation societies of Virginia, Georgia, and the Carolinas began to move to the area. West Florida was quickly consolidated with East and the new capital of Florida became Tallahassee, halfway between the old capitals of St. Augustine and Pensacola, in 1824.

Once many Americans had begun to immigrate to the new territory, it became apparent that there would be continued skirmishes with local Creek and Miccosukee peoples and white settlers encroaching on their land. The United States government favored removal policies, but local indigenous groups in Florida refused to leave without fighting. The nineteenth century saw three Seminole Wars. In 1823, territorial governor William Duval and James Gadsden signed the Treaty of Moultrie Creek, forcing Seminoles onto a four million acre reservation in central Florida. The Second Seminole War (1835–1842) was the longest war of Indian removal and resulted when the United States government attempted to move the Seminole people from Central Florida to a Creek reservation west of the Mississippi River. As a result of the Seminole War, Seminole prisoners, including the prominent leader Osceola, were held captive in the Castillo de San Marcos, renamed Fort Marion after General Francis Marion, who fought in the American Revolution, in the 1830s.

By 1840, the territory's population had reached 54,477 people. Half the population were enslaved Africans. Steamboats were popular on the Apalachicola and St. Johns Rivers, and there were several plans for railroad construction. The territory south of present-day Gainesville was sparsely populated by whites.

In 1845 the Florida Territory was admitted into the Union as the State of Florida.

=== Civil War ===
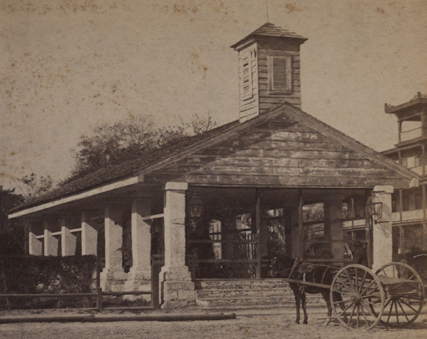
Slave Market, St. Augustine, Florida in 1886

On January 7, 1861, only three days before Florida would secede and join the Confederacy, a group of 125 Florida militia marched on Fort Marion. The fort was guarded by a single sergeant, who surrendered the fort after being provided with a receipt. Gen. Robert E. Lee, who was commander of coastal defenses at the time, ordered that the fort's cannons be removed and sent to more strategic locations, such as Fernandina and the mouth of the St. Johns River.

The town raised a Confederate militia unit, known as the Florida Independent Blues or the Saint Augustine Blues. They were soon joined by the Milton Guard, another militia unit.

In an effort to help blockade runners avoid capture, the Confederate government ordered all lighthouses to be extinguished. In St. Augustine, the customhouse officer, Paul Arnau, organized the "Coastal Guard", a group who worked to disable the lighthouses along Florida's east coast. They started by removing and hiding the lenses from the St. Augustine Light before moving south. After successfully dismantling the lighthouses at Cape Canaveral, Jupiter Inlet, and Key Biscayne, Arnau returned to St. Augustine. He would then serve as mayor from 1861 until early 1862, just before the Federals took over the city.

The Confederate authorities remained in control of St. Augustine for fourteen months, although it was barely defended. The Union conducted a blockade of shipping. In 1862 Union troops gained control of St. Augustine and controlled it through the rest of the war. With the economy already suffering, many residents fled.

=== Henry Flagler and the railroad ===
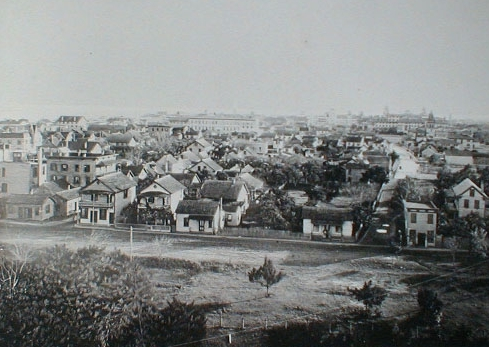
St. Augustine in 1891 from the former San Marco Hotel, Spanish St. on left, Huguenot Cemetery lower left corner, Cordova St. on right

Henry Flagler, a co-founder with John D. Rockefeller of the Standard Oil Company, spent the winter of 1883 in St. Augustine with his second wife Ida Alice (née Shourds) Flagler and found the city charming, but considered its hotels and transportation systems inadequate. He had the idea to make St. Augustine a winter resort for wealthy Americans from the north, and to bring them south he bought several short line railroads and combined these in 1885 to form the Florida East Coast Railway. He built a railroad bridge over the St. Johns River in 1888, opening up the Atlantic coast of Florida to development. The St. Augustine Lighthouse, completed in 1874, became an important navigational landmark during this period of regional growth and reflected the city's increasing role in coastal transportation.

Flagler finished construction in 1887 on two large ornate hotels in the city, the 450-room Hotel Ponce de Leon and the 250-room Hotel Alcazar. The Hotel Ponce de Leon was powered by Edison Electric, making it one of the nation's first electrified buildings. The next year, he purchased the Casa Monica Hotel (renaming it the Cordova Hotel) across the street from both the Alcazar and the Ponce de Leon. His chosen architectural firm, Carrère and Hastings, radically altered the appearance of St. Augustine with these hotels, giving it a skyline and beginning an architectural trend in the state characterized by the use of the Spanish Renaissance Revival and Moorish Revival styles. With the opening of the Ponce de Leon in 1888, St. Augustine became the winter resort of American high society for a few years.

Henry Flagler’s investments in St. Augustine went beyond hotels though; his developments shaped the city’s streetscapes, transportation routes, and public spaces, influencing the growth of local businesses and neighborhoods. The introduction of modern infrastructure, including electricity and paved roads around his properties, helped integrate tourism with daily life in the city. These changes set a precedent for future urban planning and highlighted the role of private investment in shaping St. Augustine’s built environment.

When Flagler's Florida East Coast Railroad was extended southward to Palm Beach and then Miami in the early 20th century, the wealthy stopped in St. Augustine en route to the southern resorts. As time went on, Miami and the South Florida area saw a huge building boom, and wealthy vacationers began to spend their winters in South Florida. St. Augustine nevertheless still attracted tourists, and eventually became a destination for families traveling in automobiles as new highways were built and Americans took to the road for annual winter and summer vacations. The tourist industry soon became the dominant sector of the local economy.

=== Civil Rights Movement ===
In 1963, nearly a decade after the Supreme Court ruling in Brown v. Board of Education that segregation of schools was unconstitutional, African Americans were still trying to get St. Augustine to integrate the public schools in the city. They were also trying to integrate public accommodations, such as lunch counters, and were met with arrests and Ku Klux Klan violence. Local students held protests throughout the city, including sit-ins at the local Woolworth's, picket lines, and marches through the downtown. These protests were often met with police violence. Homes of African Americans were firebombed, black leaders were assaulted and threatened with death, and others were fired from their jobs.

In the spring of 1964, St. Augustine civil rights leader Robert Hayling asked the Southern Christian Leadership Conference (SCLC) and its leader Martin Luther King Jr. for assistance. From May until July 1964, King and Hayling, along with Hosea Williams, C. T. Vivian, Dorothy Cotton, Andrew Young and others, organized marches, sit-ins, pray-ins, wade-ins and other forms of protest in St. Augustine. Hundreds of black and white civil rights supporters were arrested, and the jails were filled to capacity. At the request of Hayling and King, civil rights supporters from elsewhere, including students, clergy, activists and well-known public figures, came to St. Augustine and were arrested together.

St. Augustine was the only place in Florida where King was arrested; his arrest there occurred on June 11, 1964, on the steps of the Monson Motor Lodge's restaurant. The demonstrations came to a climax when a group of black and white protesters jumped into the hotel's segregated swimming pool. In response to the protest, James Brock, the manager of the hotel and the president of the Florida Hotel & Motel Association, poured muriatic acid into the pool to scare the protesters. Photographs of this, and of a policeman jumping into the pool to arrest the protesters, were broadcast around the world. One appeared on the front page of the Washington paper the day the senate went to vote on the passage of the landmark Civil Rights Act of 1964. It became the most famous photograph ever taken in St. Augustine.

The Ku Klux Klan and its supporters responded to these protests with violent attacks that were widely reported in national and international media. Popular revulsion against the Klan and police violence in St. Augustine generated national sympathy for the black protesters and became a key factor in Congressional passage of the Civil Rights Act of 1964, leading eventually to passage of the Voting Rights Act of 1965, both of which provided federal enforcement of constitutional rights.

St. Augustine's historically Black college, now Florida Memorial University, felt itself unwelcome in St. Augustine, and departed in 1968 for a new campus near Opa-locka in Dade County. It is currently located in the Opa-locka North neighborhood of Miami Gardens, next to St. Thomas University.

=== Modern St. Augustine ===
In 1965, St. Augustine celebrated the 400th anniversary of its founding, and jointly with the State of Florida, inaugurated a program to restore part of the city. The Historic St. Augustine Preservation Board was formed to reconstruct more than thirty-six buildings to their historical appearance, which was completed within a few years. When the State of Florida abolished the Board in 1997, the City of St. Augustine assumed control of the reconstructed buildings, as well as other historic properties including the Government House. In 2010, the city transferred control of the historic buildings to UF Historic St. Augustine, Inc., a direct support organization of the University of Florida.

Cross and Sword was a 1965 play by American playwright Paul Green created to honor the 400th anniversary of the settlement of St. Augustine. It was Florida's official state play, having received the designation by the Florida Senate in 1973. It was performed for ten weeks every summer in St. Augustine for more than 30 years, closing in 1996.

In 2015, St. Augustine celebrated the 450th anniversary of its founding with a four-day long festival and a visit from Felipe VI of Spain and Queen Letizia of Spain.

On October 7, 2016 Hurricane Matthew caused widespread flooding in downtown St. Augustine.

In 2017, skeletal remains believed to be from the earliest settlements were found inside the Fiesta Mall. After hurricane Matthew in 2016, the owner of the wine shop was renovating when an archeologist found the remains in the dirt under it.

As of 2022, St. Augustine hosts numerous cultural events that celebrate its history and heritage, including the annual Nights of Lights festival, which illuminates the historic district with millions of holiday lights. The city also holds Spanish colonial reenactments, art festivals, and music events that draw both residents and tourists. These celebrations reinforce St. Augustine’s identity as a center for historical and cultural tourism.

== Geography and climate ==
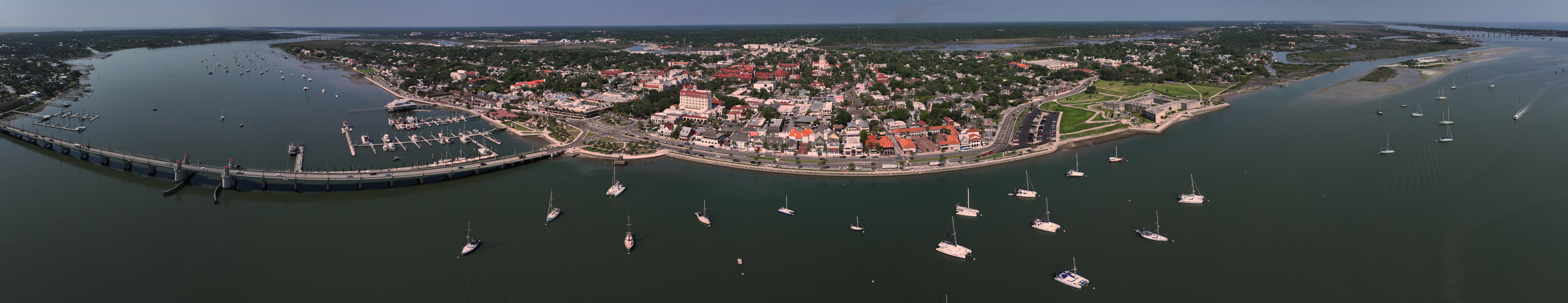
View of St. Augustine from over the Matanzas River

According to the United States Census Bureau, the city has a total area of 10.7 square miles (27.8 km^{2}), 8.4 square miles (21.7 km^{2}) of which is land and 2.4 square miles (6.1 km^{2}) (21.99%) is water. Access to the Atlantic Ocean is via the St. Augustine Inlet of the Matanzas River.

St. Augustine has a humid subtropical climate (Cfa) typical of the Gulf and South Atlantic states. The low latitude and coastal location give the city a mostly warm and sunny climate. Unlike much of the contiguous United States, St. Augustine's driest time of year is winter. The hot and wet season extends from May through October, while the cool and dry season extends November through April.

In summer, average high temperatures are in the lower 90's F (32 C) and normal low temperatures are in the 70's F (20 - 22 C). The Bermuda High pumps in hot and unstable tropical air from the Bahamas and Gulf of Mexico, which help create the daily thundershowers that are typical in summer months. Intense but very brief downpours are common in summer in the city. Fall and spring are warm and sunny with highs from 74 °F to 87 °F and lows in the 50s to 70s.

In winter, St. Augustine has generally mild and sunny weather typical of the Florida peninsula. The coolest months are from December through February, with highs from 67 °F to 70 °F and lows from 47 °F to 51 °F. From November through April, St. Augustine often has long periods of rainless weather. April can see near drought conditions with brush fires and water restrictions in place. St. Augustine averages 4.6 frosts per year. The record low of 10 °F (−12 °C) happened on January 21, 1985. Hurricanes occasionally impact the region; however, like most areas prone to such storms, St. Augustine rarely suffers a direct hit by a major hurricane. The last direct hit by a major hurricane to the city was Hurricane Dora in 1964. Extensive flooding occurred in the downtown area of St. Augustine when Hurricane Matthew passed east of the city in October 2016.

Climate data for St. Augustine, Florida (St. Augustine Light), 1991–2020 normals, extremes 1892–present
Month	Jan	Feb	Mar	Apr	May	Jun	Jul	Aug	Sep	Oct	Nov	Dec	Year
Record high °F (°C)	87 (31)	90 (32)	94 (34)	96 (36)	99 (37)	104 (40)	103 (39)	102 (39)	100 (38)	98 (37)	92 (33)	89 (32)	104 (40)
Mean maximum °F (°C)	80.0 (26.7)	81.8 (27.7)	84.9 (29.4)	88.6 (31.4)	93.3 (34.1)	95.9 (35.5)	97.6 (36.4)	96.0 (35.6)	92.8 (33.8)	89.0 (31.7)	84.2 (29.0)	81.1 (27.3)	98.5 (36.9)
Mean daily maximum °F (°C)	67.5 (19.7)	69.7 (20.9)	74.4 (23.6)	79.8 (26.6)	85.1 (29.5)	88.6 (31.4)	91.0 (32.8)	89.9 (32.2)	87.4 (30.8)	81.8 (27.7)	74.9 (23.8)	68.9 (20.5)	79.9 (26.6)
Daily mean °F (°C)	57.6 (14.2)	60.0 (15.6)	64.5 (18.1)	70.2 (21.2)	76.3 (24.6)	80.4 (26.9)	82.4 (28.0)	82.1 (27.8)	80.3 (26.8)	74.2 (23.4)	66.2 (19.0)	60.1 (15.6)	71.2 (21.8)
Mean daily minimum °F (°C)	47.8 (8.8)	50.2 (10.1)	54.6 (12.6)	60.6 (15.9)	67.4 (19.7)	72.3 (22.4)	73.8 (23.2)	74.2 (23.4)	73.1 (22.8)	66.5 (19.2)	57.5 (14.2)	51.3 (10.7)	62.4 (16.9)
Mean minimum °F (°C)	28.1 (−2.2)	32.1 (0.1)	36.9 (2.7)	44.6 (7.0)	55.6 (13.1)	64.8 (18.2)	68.1 (20.1)	68.6 (20.3)	64.0 (17.8)	49.0 (9.4)	39.1 (3.9)	31.4 (−0.3)	25.6 (−3.6)
Record low °F (°C)	10 (−12)	12 (−11)	23 (−5)	33 (1)	41 (5)	52 (11)	59 (15)	59 (15)	51 (11)	36 (2)	25 (−4)	16 (−9)	10 (−12)
Average precipitation inches (mm)	2.74 (70)	2.69 (68)	3.43 (87)	2.93 (74)	3.66 (93)	6.27 (159)	4.88 (124)	7.18 (182)	7.18 (182)	4.37 (111)	2.32 (59)	2.99 (76)	50.64 (1,286)
Average precipitation days (≥ 0.01 in)	9.4	7.8	8.6	6.8	7.2	12.3	11.6	15.0	13.5	9.1	8.1	8.4	117.8
Source: NOAA (mean maxima/minima 1981–2010)

== Demographics ==
Historical population
Census	Pop.	Note	%±
1830	1,708		—
1840	2,450		43.4%
1850	1,934		−21.1%
1860	1,914		−1.0%
1870	1,717		−10.3%
1880	2,293		33.5%
1890	4,742		106.8%
1900	4,272		−9.9%
1910	5,494		28.6%
1920	6,192		12.7%
1930	12,111		95.6%
1940	12,090		−0.2%
1950	13,555		12.1%
1960	14,734		8.7%
1970	12,352		−16.2%
1980	11,985		−3.0%
1990	11,692		−2.4%
2000	11,592		−0.9%
2010	12,975		11.9%
2020	14,329		10.4%
U.S. Decennial Census

=== Racial and ethnic composition ===
St. Augustine racial composition (Hispanics excluded from racial categories) (NH = Non-Hispanic)
Race	Pop 2010	Pop 2020	% 2010	% 2020
White (NH)	10,443	11,275	80.49%	78.69%
Black or African American (NH)	1,460	1,136	11.25%	7.93%
Native American or Alaska Native (NH)	46	40	0.35%	0.28%
Asian (NH)	155	246	1.19%	1.72%
Pacific Islander or Native Hawaiian (NH)	10	7	0.08%	0.05%
Some other race (NH)	19	53	0.15%	0.37%
Two or more races/Multiracial (NH)	186	523	1.43%	3.65%
Hispanic or Latino (any race)	656	1,049	5.06%	7.32%
Total	12,975	14,329		

=== 2020 census ===
As of the 2020 census, St. Augustine had a population of 14,329. The median age was 48.7 years. 2.2% of residents were under the age of 5, 11.9% were under the age of 18, and 26.9% were 65 years of age or older. 57.9% of the population was female. For every 100 females there were 84.9 males, and for every 100 females age 18 and over there were 82.4 males age 18 and over.

98.8% of residents lived in urban areas, while 1.2% lived in rural areas.

There were 6,601 households in St. Augustine, of which 16.5% had children under the age of 18 living in them. Of all households, 35.6% were married-couple households, 21.3% were households with a male householder and no spouse or partner present, and 34.8% were households with a female householder and no spouse or partner present. About 37.8% of all households were made up of individuals, and 16.9% had someone living alone who was 65 years of age or older.

There were 8,096 housing units, of which 18.5% were vacant. The homeowner vacancy rate was 3.4% and the rental vacancy rate was 12.1%.

=== 2020 estimates ===
In 2020, the median value of owner-occupied housing units was $294,600. The median gross rent was $1,118. 91.2% of households had a computer and 83.0% of households had a broadband internet subscription.

In 2020, 93.8% of the population age 25 and older had a high school degree or higher, and 37.4% of that population had a bachelor's degree or higher.

In 2020, the median household income was $80,473. The per capita income was $33,060. 17.0% of the population lived below the Poverty threshold.

In 2020, 8.5% of people were without health care coverage.

There were 1,230 veterans living in the city between 2016 and 2020, and 6.6% of the population were foreign-born persons.

=== 2010 census ===
As of the 2010 United States census, there were 12,975 people, 5,494 households, and 2,546 families residing in the city.

=== Recent trends ===
Between 2018 and 2023, the share of remote workers in St. Johns County rose from about 8.6% to nearly 24%, making St. Augustine a growing remote-work hub.

== Government and politics ==
St. Augustine is the county seat of St. Johns County, Florida.

The city of St. Augustine operates under a city commission government, specifically the commissioner-manager form, with an elected mayor, vice mayor, and city commission. Additionally, the government includes a city manager, city attorney, city clerk, and various city boards.

== Transportation ==
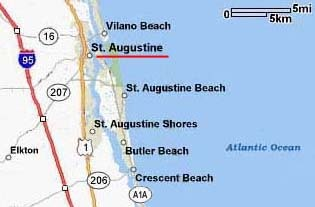
Major roadways, St. Augustine and vicinity

=== Highways ===
- I-95 (Interstate 95) runs north–south.
- US 1 runs north–south.
- SR A1A runs north–south.
- SR 16 runs east–west.
- SR 207 runs northeast–southwest.
- SR 312 runs east–west.

=== Buses ===
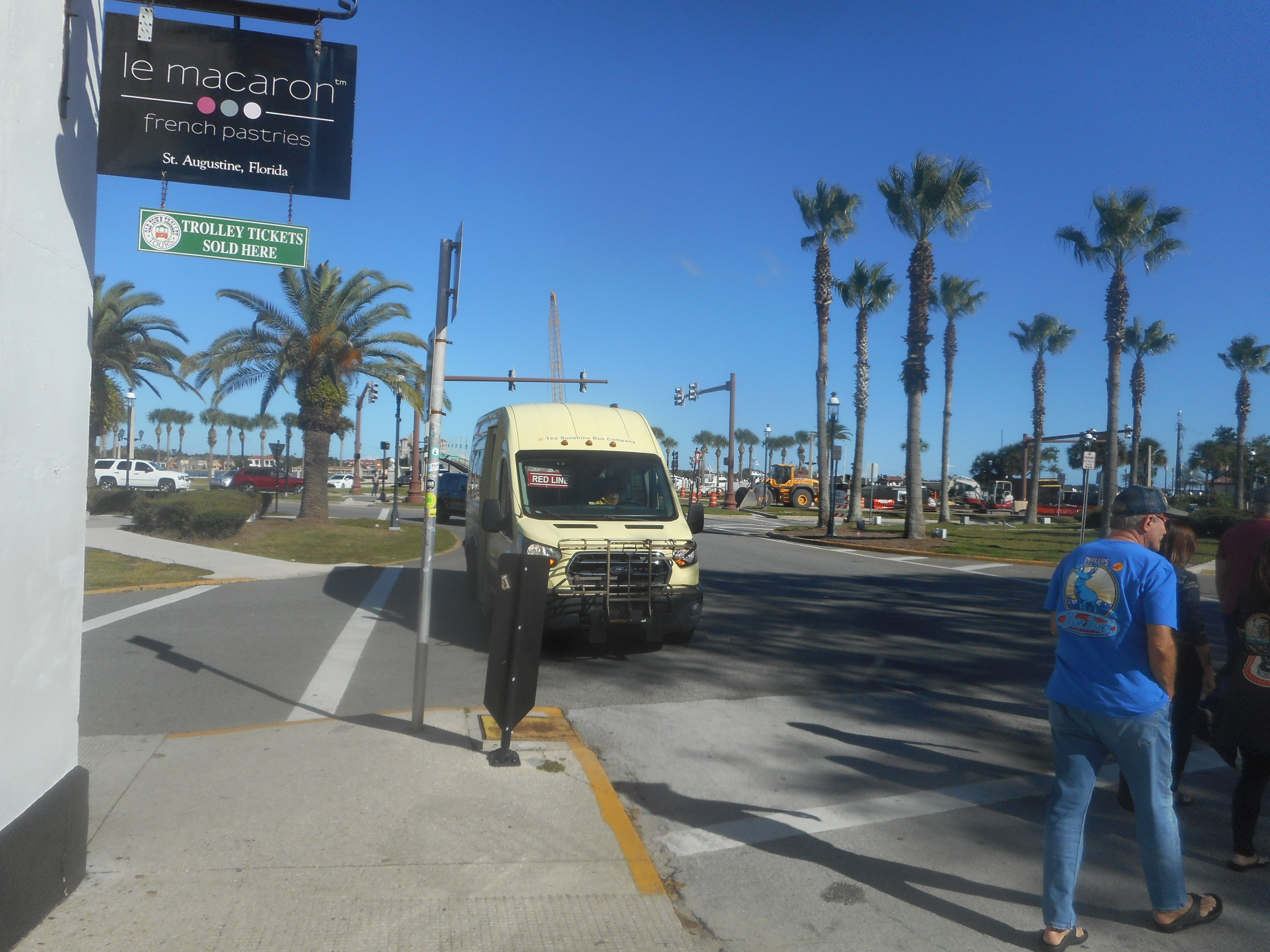
A Sunshine Bus Company bus stops at Cathedral Place.

Bus service is operated by the Sunshine Bus Company, based in St. Augustine Beach. Buses operate mainly between shopping centers across town, but a few go to Hastings and Jacksonville, where one can connect to JTA for additional service across Jacksonville.

There are also tour bus companies: Old Town Trolley Tours of St. Augustine, Red Train Tours, and the Saint Augustine Rider (STAR) Circulator.

=== Airport ===
St. Augustine has one public airport 4 miles (6.4 km) north of the downtown. It has three runways and two seaplane lanes.

=== Rail ===
The Florida East Coast Railway runs through St. Augustine. Passenger service to the city ended in 1968. First Coast Commuter Rail is a project to establish commuter rail services between Jacksonville and St. Augustine.

== Points of interest ==
=== First and second Spanish eras ===
- Avero House
- Castillo de San Marcos National Monument
- Fort Matanzas National Monument
- Fort Mose Historic State Park
- Nombre de Dios
- Gonzalez-Alvarez House
- Fountain of Youth Archaeological Park
- The Spanish Military Hospital Museum
- St. Francis Barracks
- Colonial Quarter
- Ximenez-Fatio House
- González-Jones House
- Llambias House
- Oldest Wooden Schoolhouse
- Tolomato Cemetery and Huguenot Cemetery

=== British era ===
- The King's Bakery

=== Pre-Flagler era ===
- St. Augustine Lighthouse and Museum
- Markland Mansion

=== Flagler era ===
- Ponce de Leon Hotel
- Casa Monica Hotel
- Hotel Alcazar
- Zorayda Castle
- Bridge of Lions
- Old St. Johns County Jail
- Ripley's Believe it or Not! Museum located in 1887 mansion of William Warden.
- St. Augustine Alligator Farm Zoological Park

=== Historic churches ===
- Grace United Methodist Church
- Cathedral Basilica of St. Augustine
- Memorial Presbyterian Church
- Trinity Church of St. Augustine

=== Lincolnville National Historic District – Civil Rights era ===
- St. Benedict the Moor School

=== Other points of interest ===
- Anastasia State Park
- Florida School for the Deaf and Blind
- Great Cross
- St. Augustine Amphitheatre
- St. Augustine Aquarium
- St. Augustine Pirate & Treasure Museum
- St. George Street
- Victory III, St. Augustine Scenic Cruise boat, since 1973

== Culture ==
=== Museums ===
- Lincolnville Museum and Cultural Center, an African American history museum and St. Augustine's first black public high school
- Lightner Museum, a museum of antiques

=== Music ===
- The Wobbly Toms (2003), band
- St. Augustine Celtic Music & Heritage Festival (2011), festival

=== Films ===
Notable films shot primarily in St. Augustine include:

- Revenge of the Creature (1955)
- Cross and Sword (1965)
- Illegally Yours (1988)
- D.O.A. (2022)

== Education ==
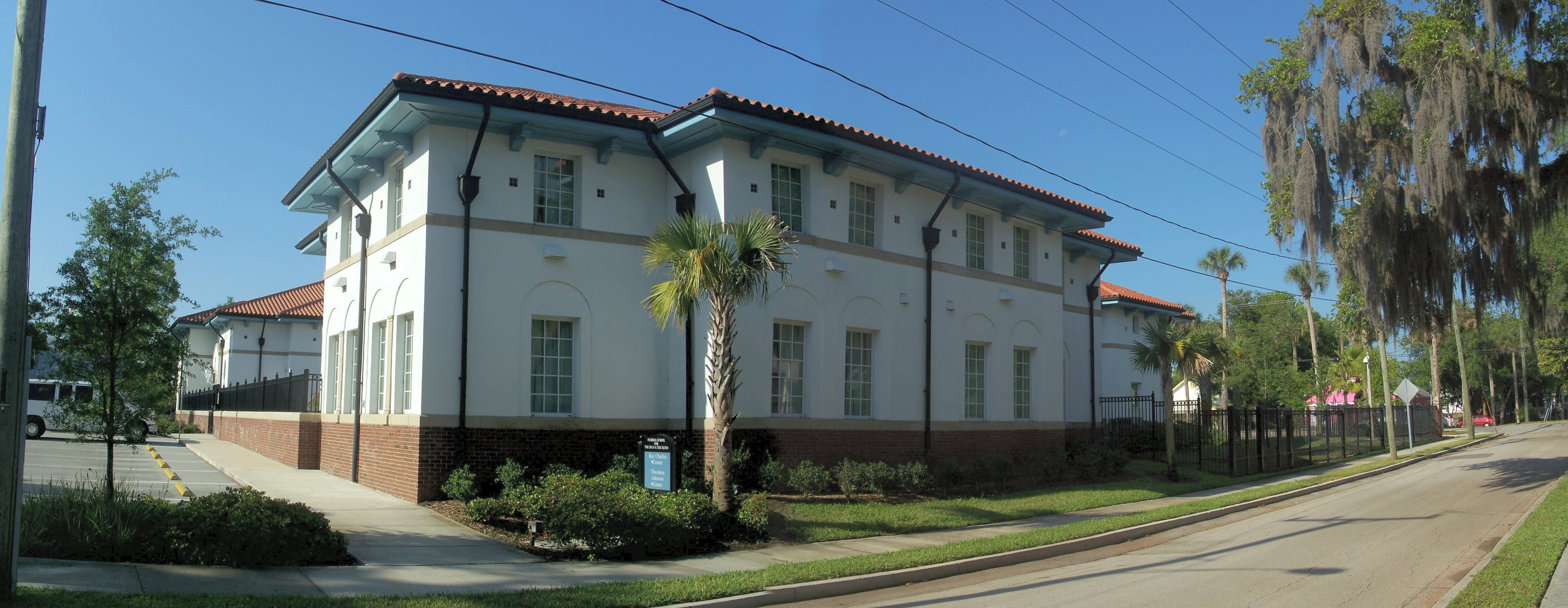
Ray Charles Center and the Theodore Johnson Center, at the Florida School for the Deaf and Blind

Primary and secondary education in St. Augustine is overseen by the St. Johns County School District.

There are four zoned elementary schools with sections of the city limits in their attendance boundaries: John A. Crookshank (outside the city limits), R. B. Hunt, Ketterlinus, and Osceola (outside the city limits). There are two zoned middle schools (both outside the city limits): R. J. Murray Middle School, and Sebastian Middle School. There are no county high schools located within St. Augustine's current city limits, but St. Augustine High School is the designated senior high school for residentially-zoned land in St. Augustine. Additionally Pedro Menendez High School, and St. Johns Technical High School are located in the vicinity.

The Florida School for the Deaf and Blind, a state-operated boarding school for deaf and blind students, was founded in the city in 1885. The Catholic Diocese of St. Augustine operates the St. Joseph Academy, Florida's oldest Catholic high school, to the west of the city.

There are several institutions of higher education in and around St. Augustine. Flagler College is a four-year liberal arts college founded in 1968. It is located in the former Ponce de Leon Hotel in downtown St. Augustine. St. Johns River State College, a state college in the Florida College System, has its St. Augustine campus just west of the city. Also in the area are the University of North Florida, Jacksonville University, and Florida State College at Jacksonville in Jacksonville.

The institution now known as Florida Memorial University was located in St. Augustine from 1918 to 1968, when it relocated to its present campus in Miami Gardens. Originally known as Florida Baptist Academy, then Florida Normal, and then Florida Memorial College, it was a historically black institution and had a wide impact on St. Augustine while it was located there. During World War II it was chosen as the site for training the first blacks in the U. S. Signal Corps. Among its faculty members was Zora Neale Hurston; a historic marker was placed in 2003 at the house at 791 West King Street where she lived while teaching at Florida Memorial (and where she completed her autobiography Dust Tracks on a Road.)

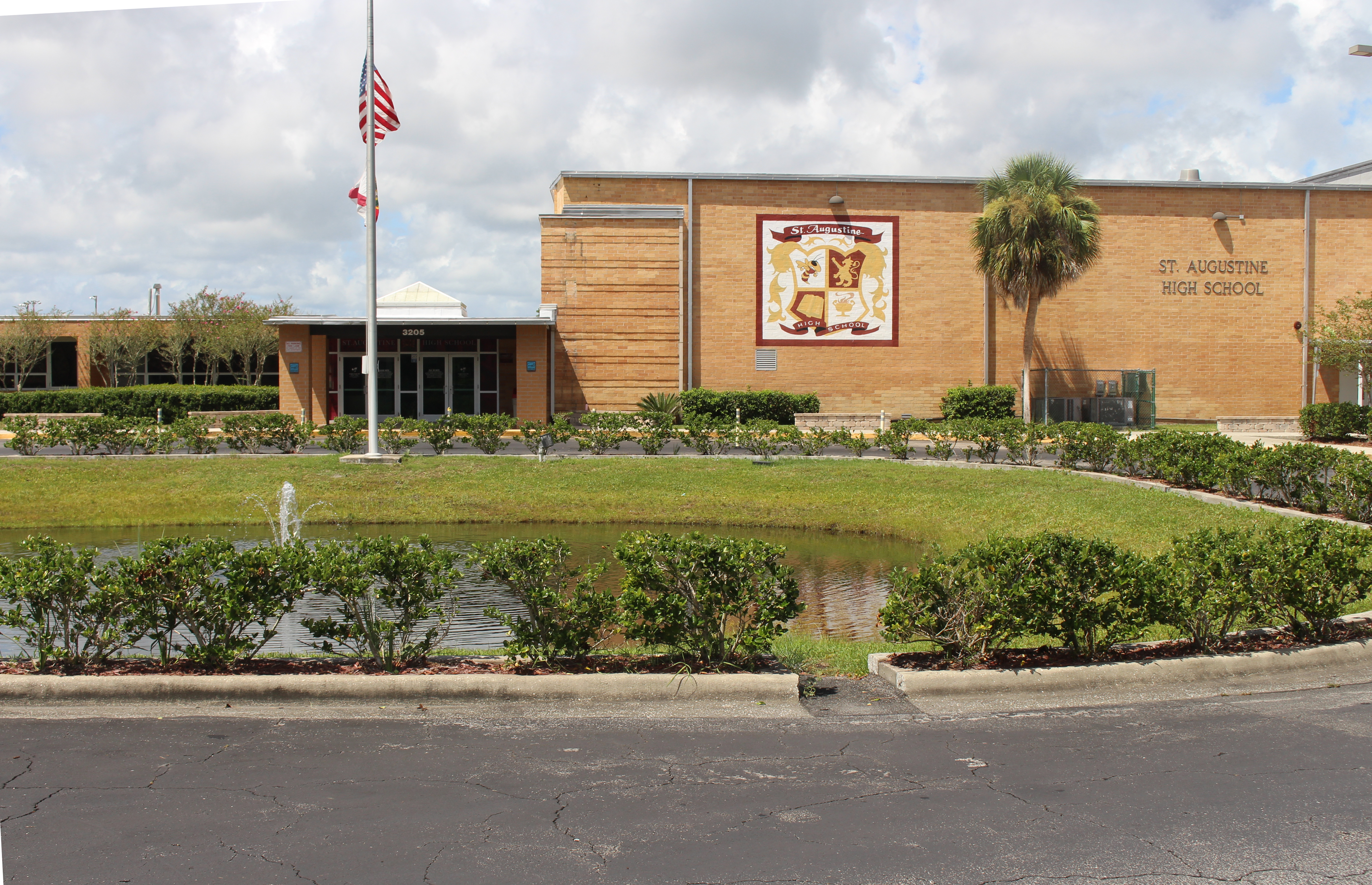
St. Augustine High School is not in the city limits, but is the zoned high school of St. Augustine

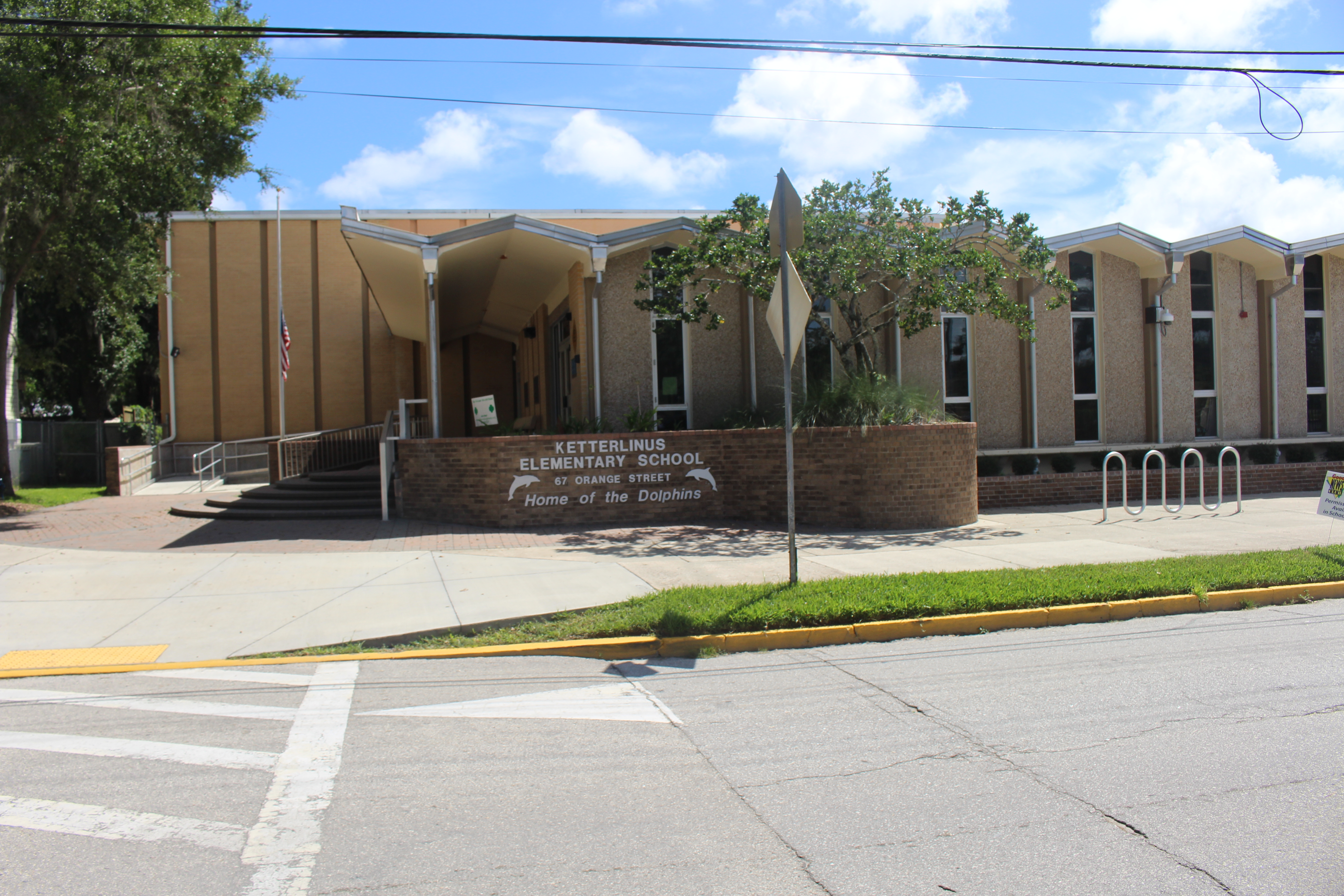
Ketterlinus Elementary School is one of two public elementary schools in the St. Augustine city limits.

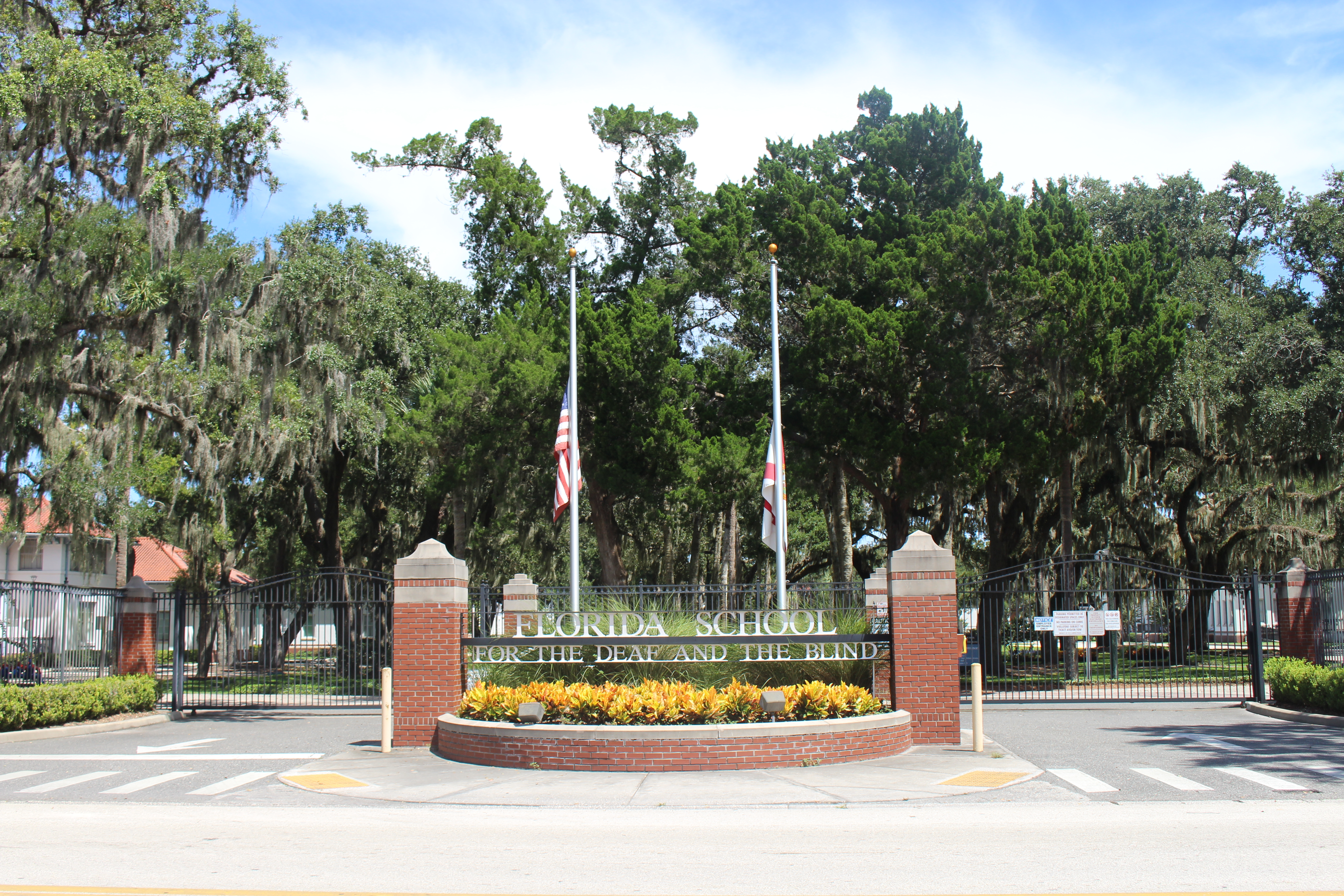
Florida School for the Deaf and Blind is a statewide K-12 school for the deaf and blind in St. Augustine

== Sister cities ==
St. Augustine's sister cities are:

- Avilés, Spain
- Cartagena, Colombia
- Menorca, Spain
- Santo Domingo, Dominican Republic

== Gallery ==
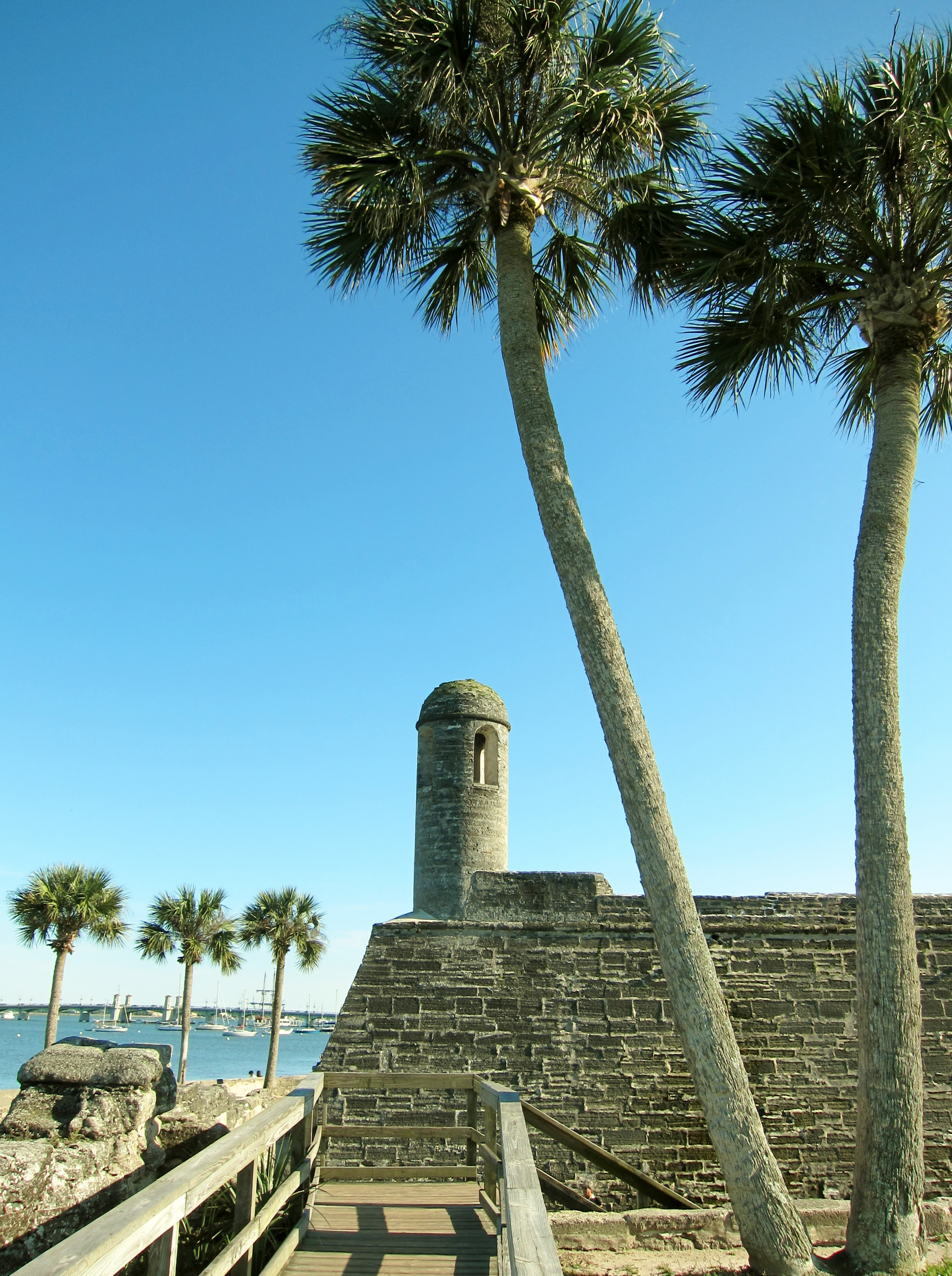
Bell tower on northeast bastion of the Castillo de San Marcos

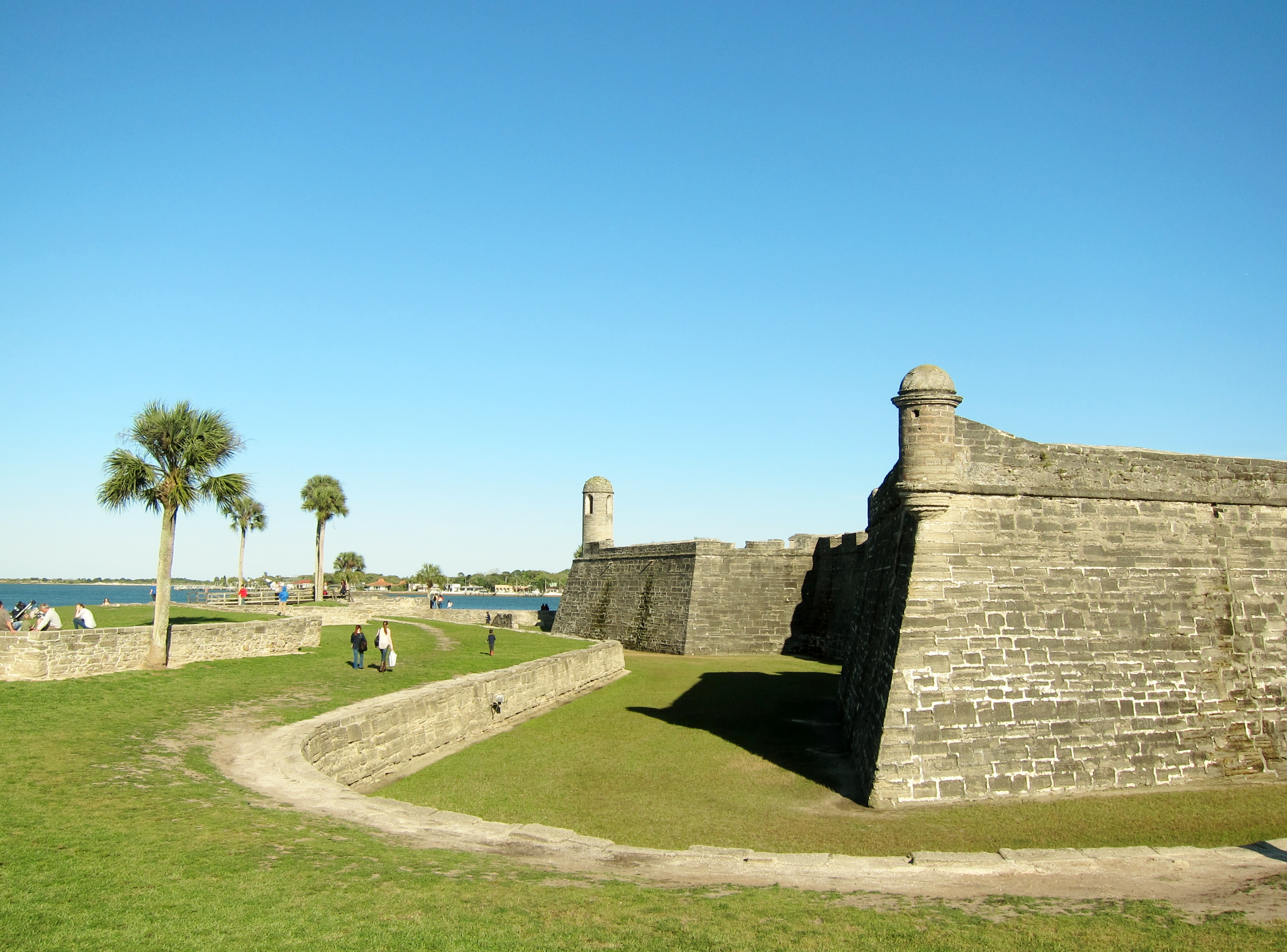
North bastions and wall of the Castillo, looking eastward toward Anastasia Island

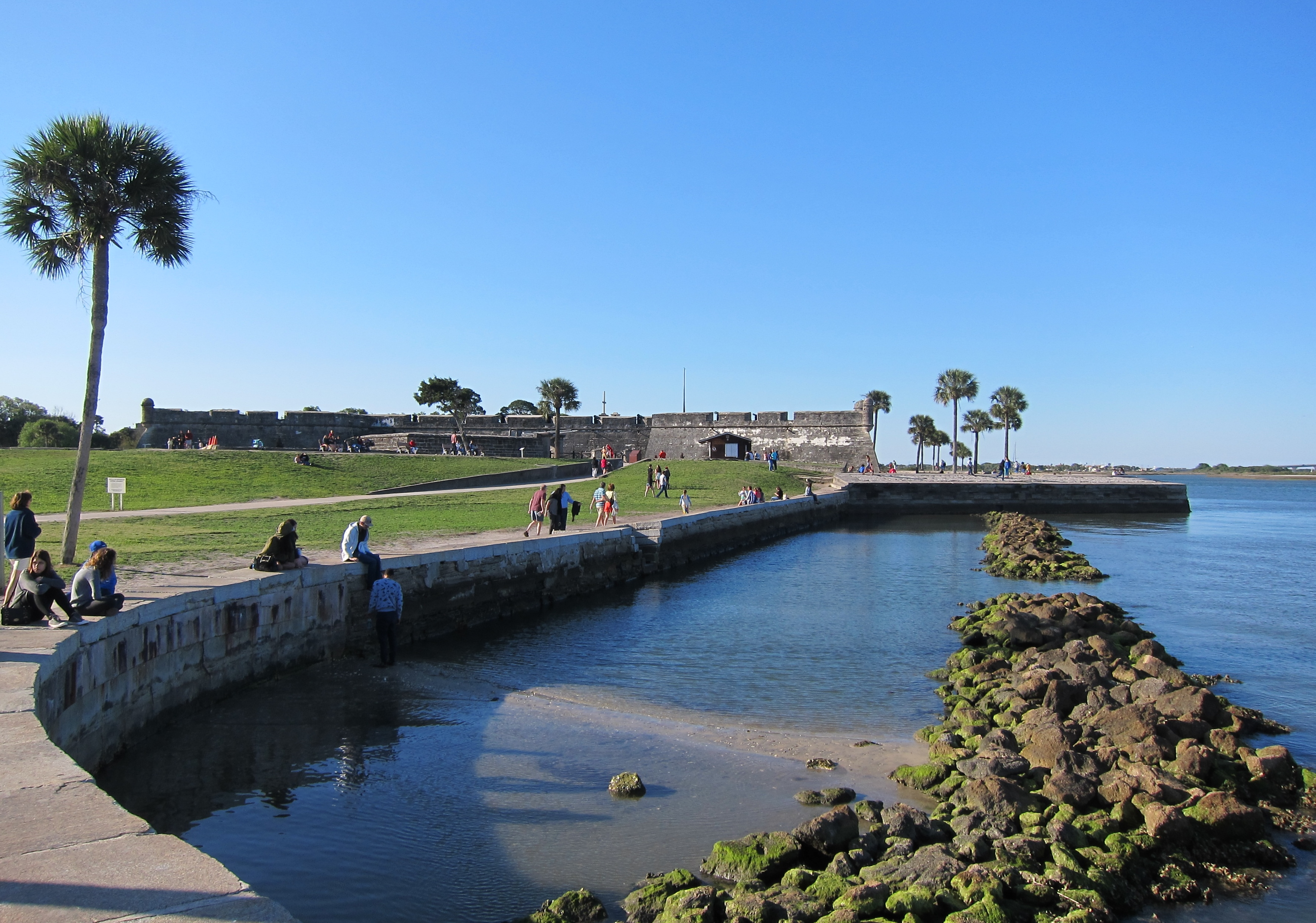
Seawall south of the Castillo

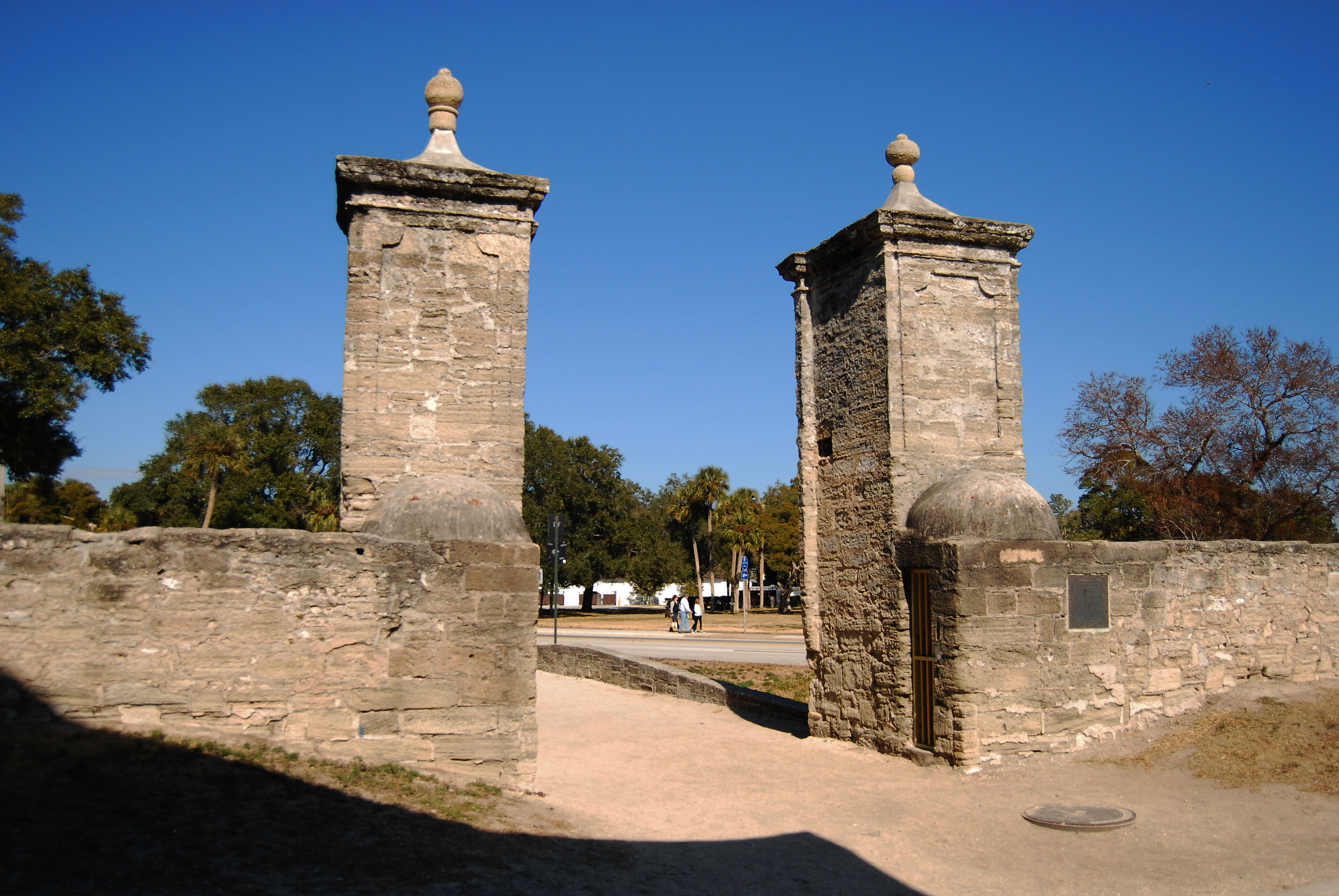
The city gates of St. Augustine, built in 1808, part of the much older Cubo Line

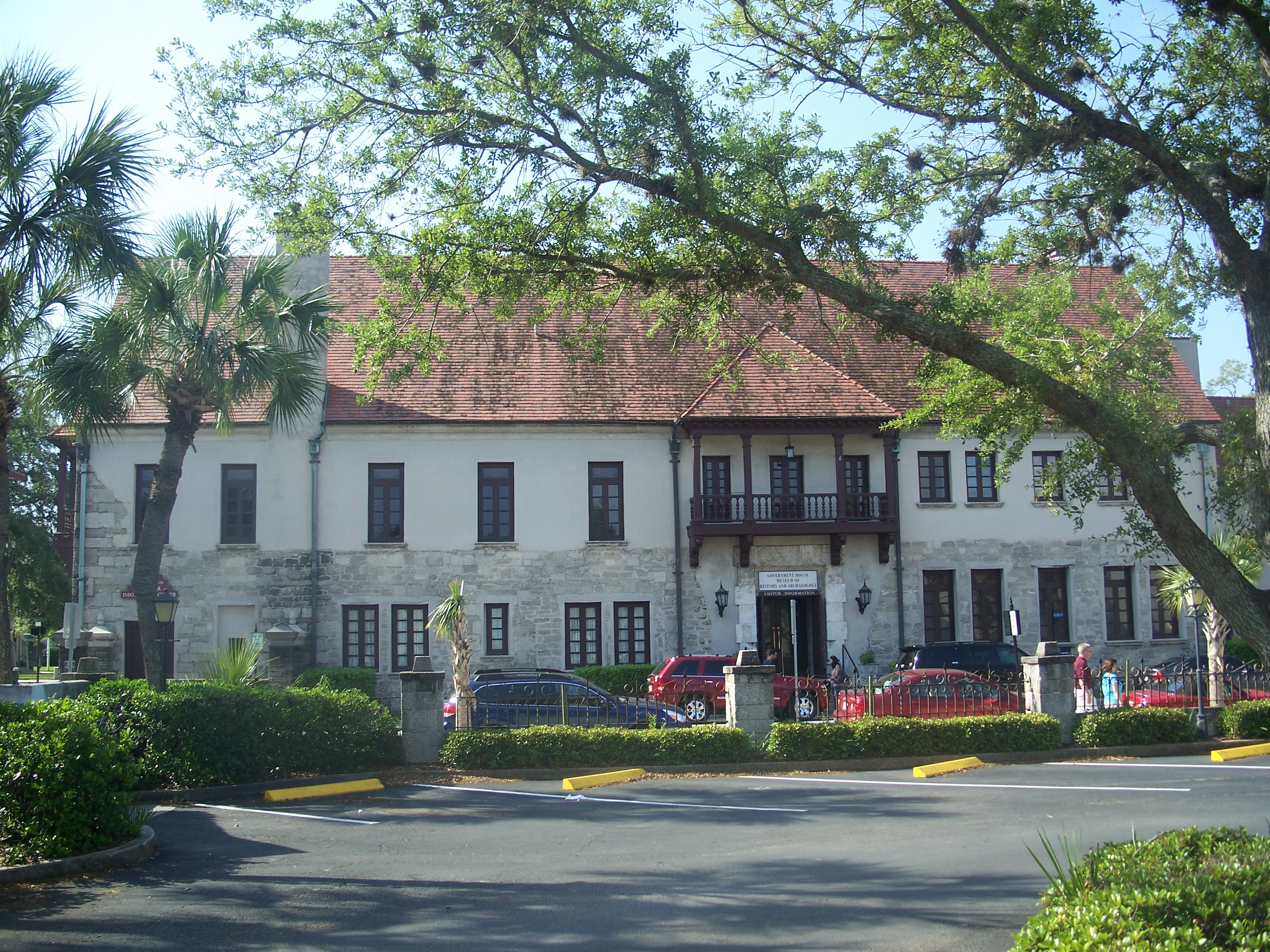
The Government House. East wing of the building dates to the 18th-century structure built on original site of the governor's residence.

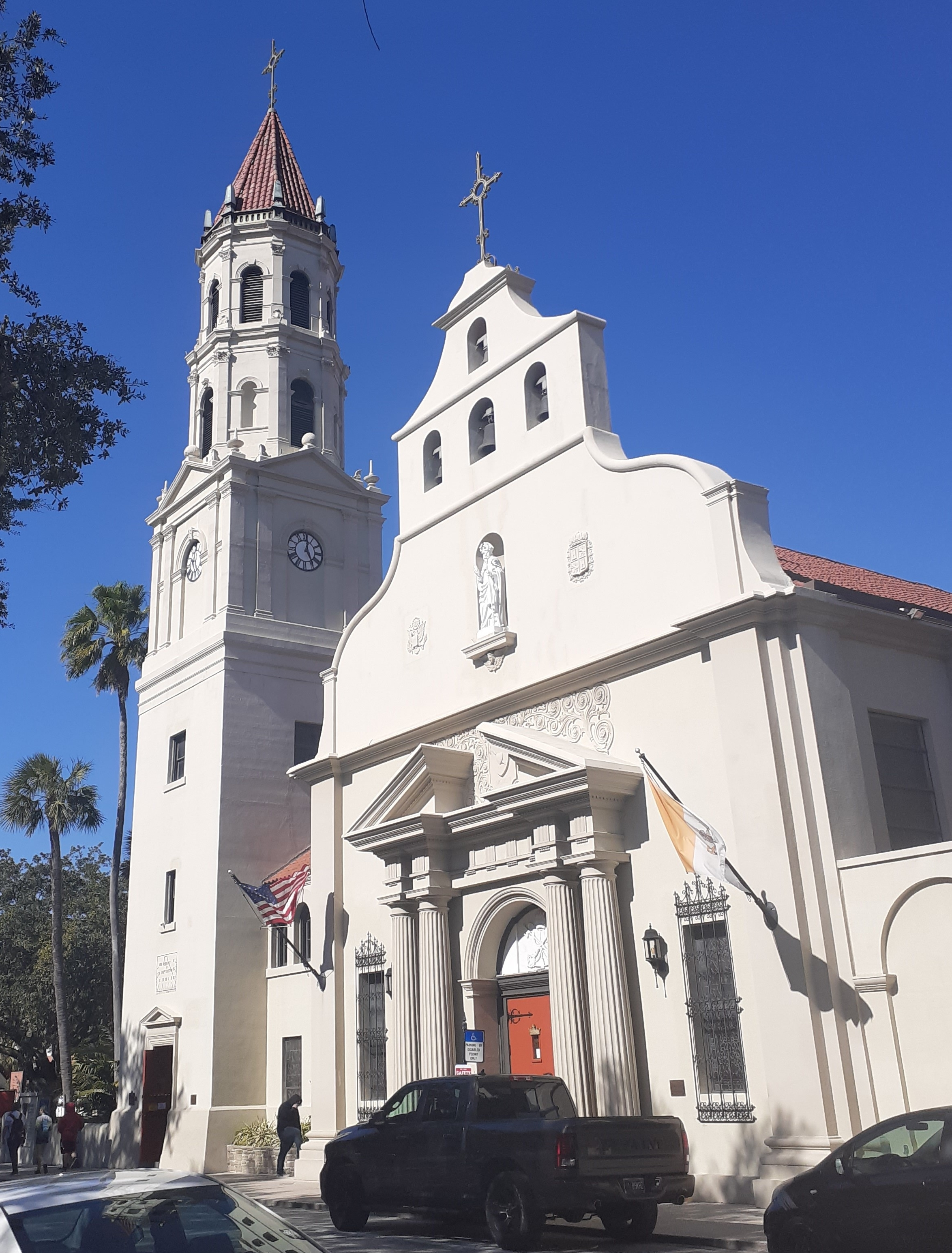
Facade of the Roman Catholic Cathedral of St. Augustine

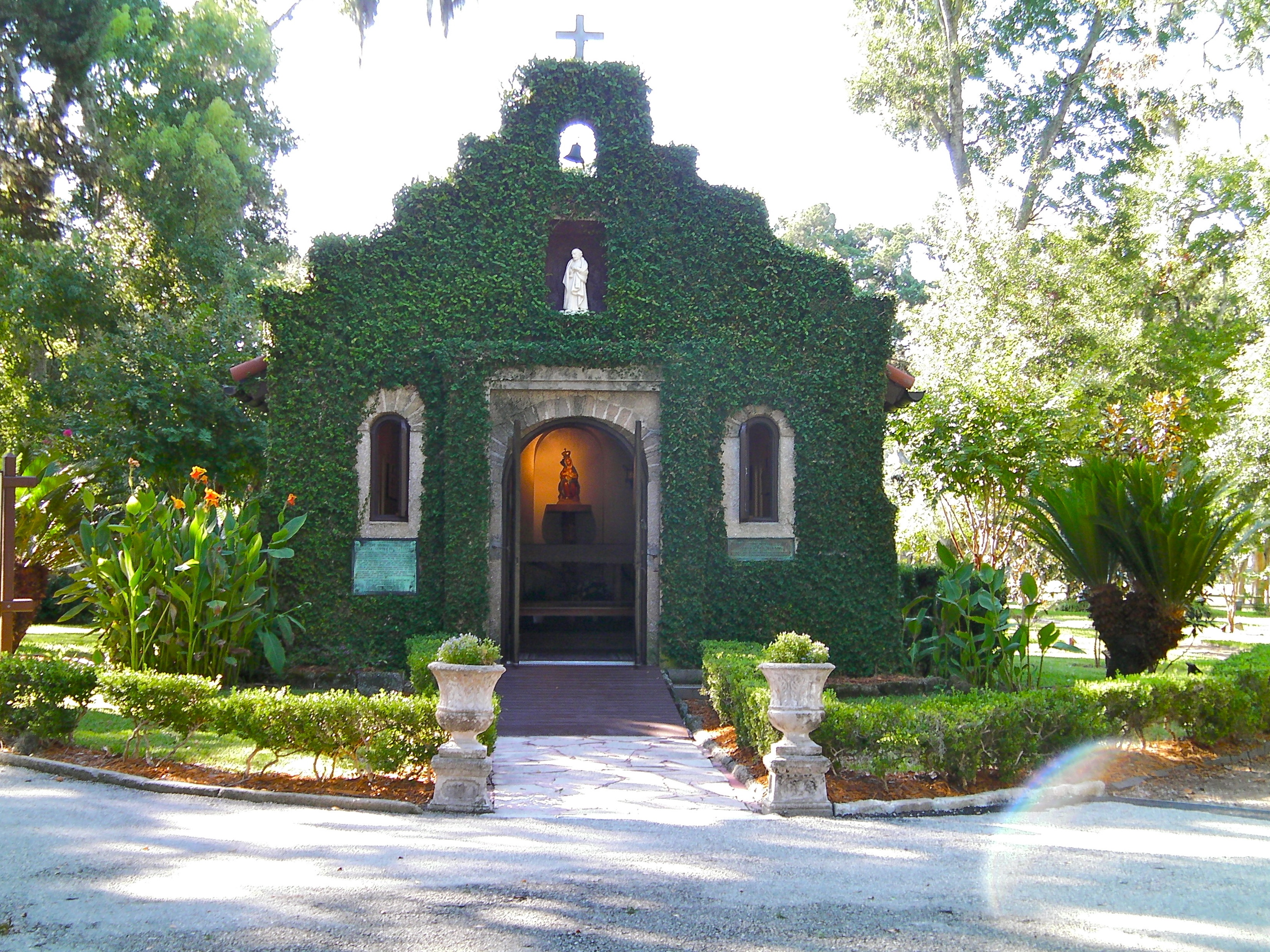
Shrine of Our Lady of La Leche at Mission Nombre de Dios

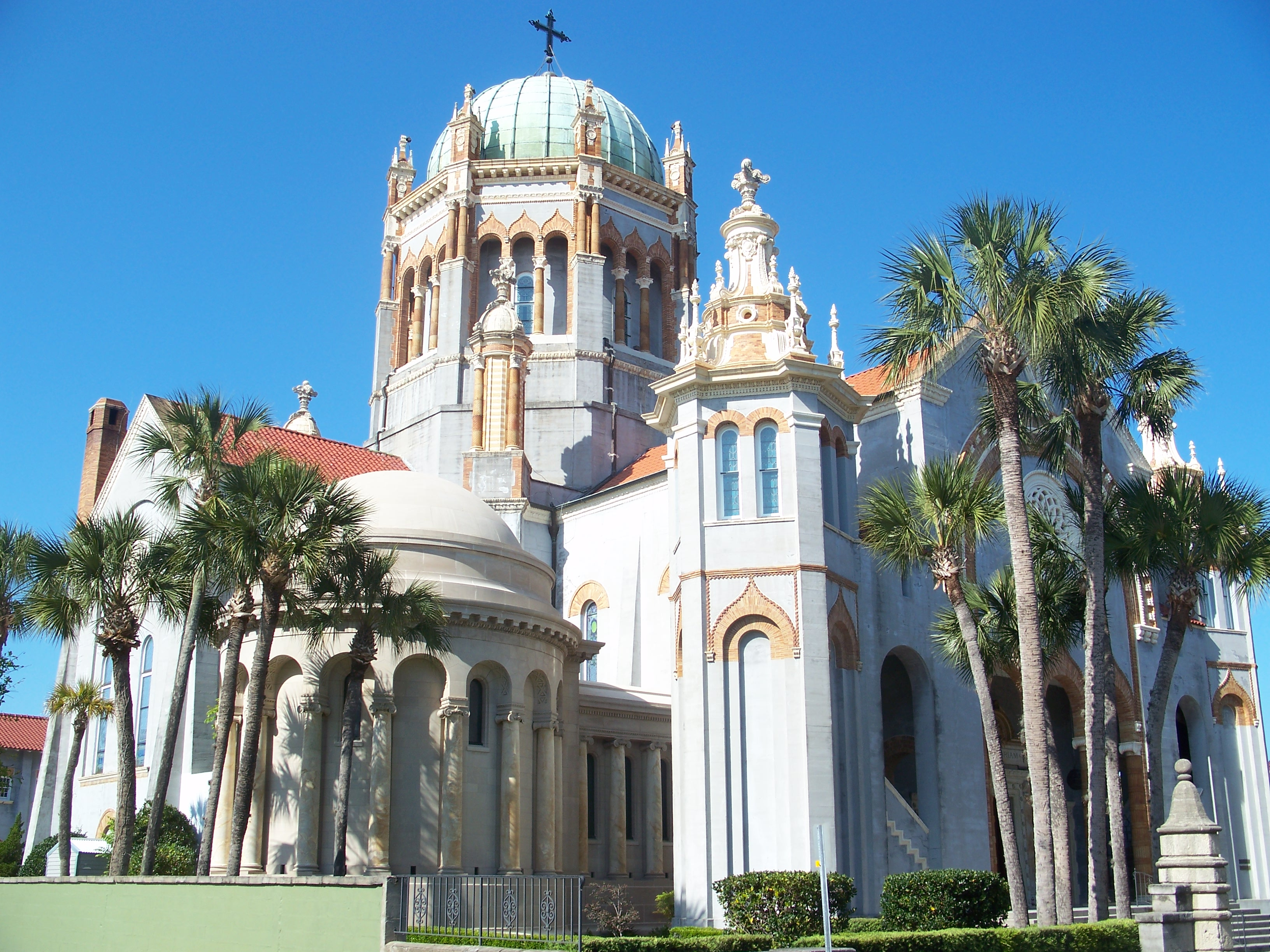
Memorial Presbyterian Church

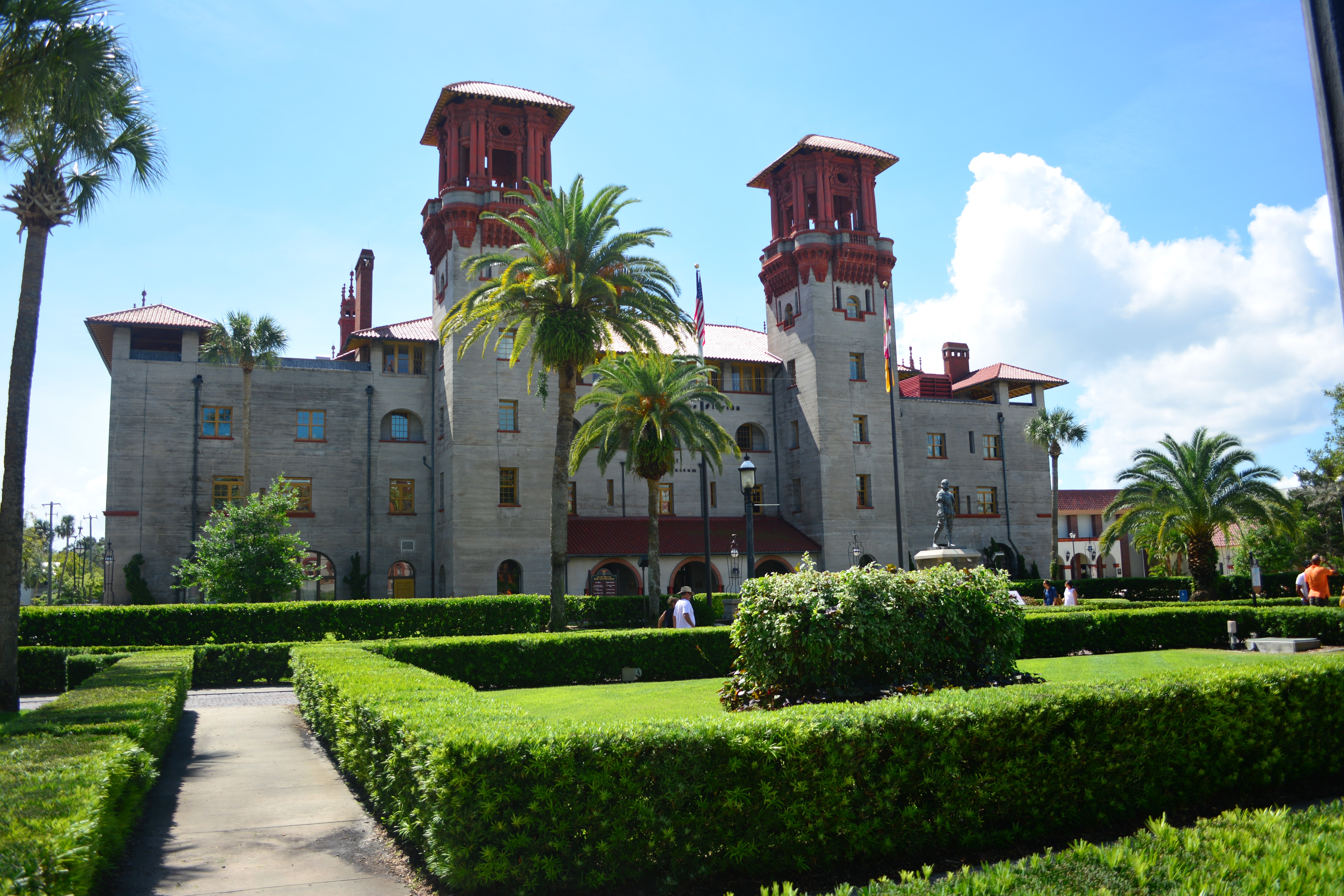
The former Hotel Alcazar now houses the Lightner Museum and City Hall

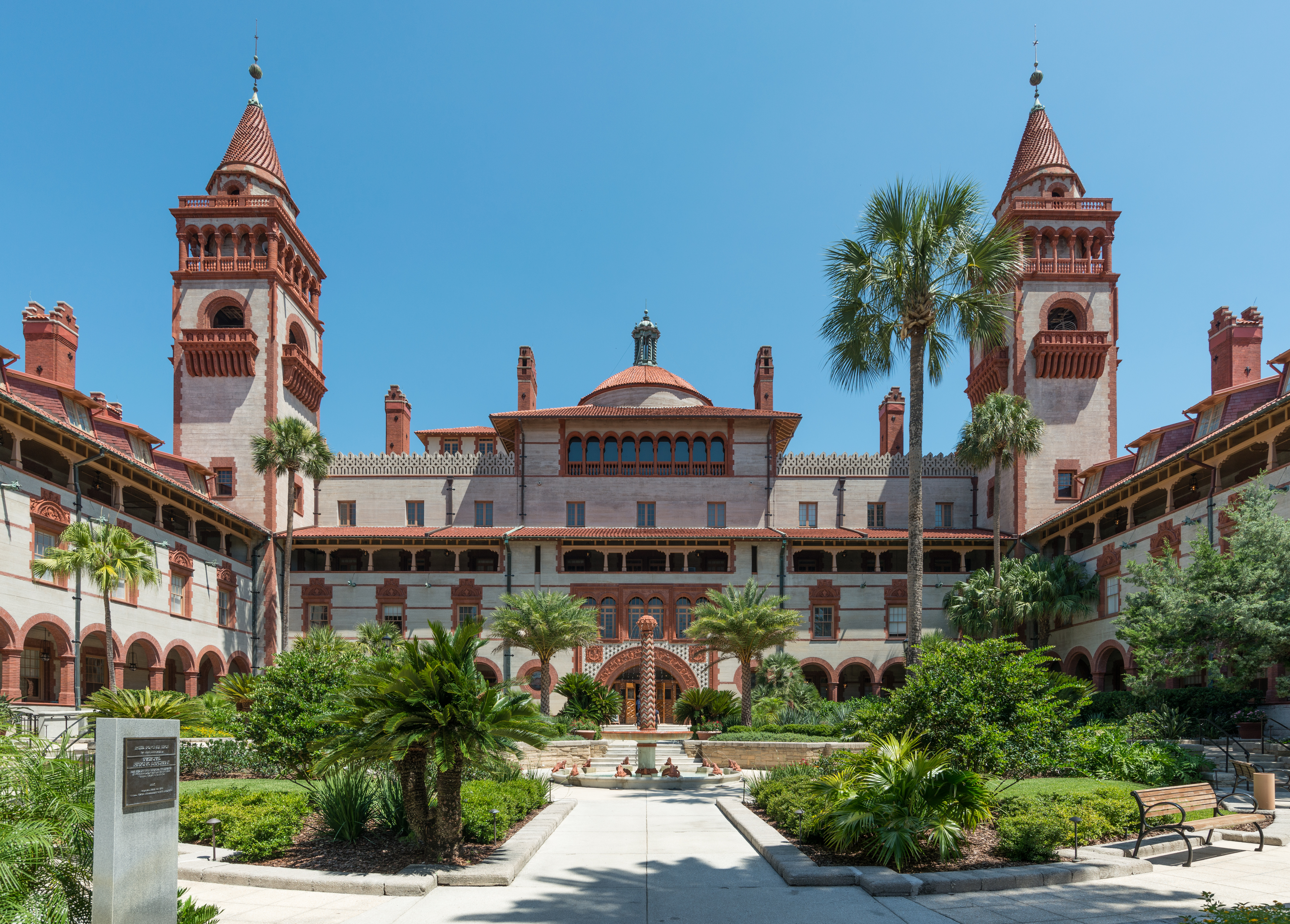
Flagler College, formerly the Ponce de Leon Hotel

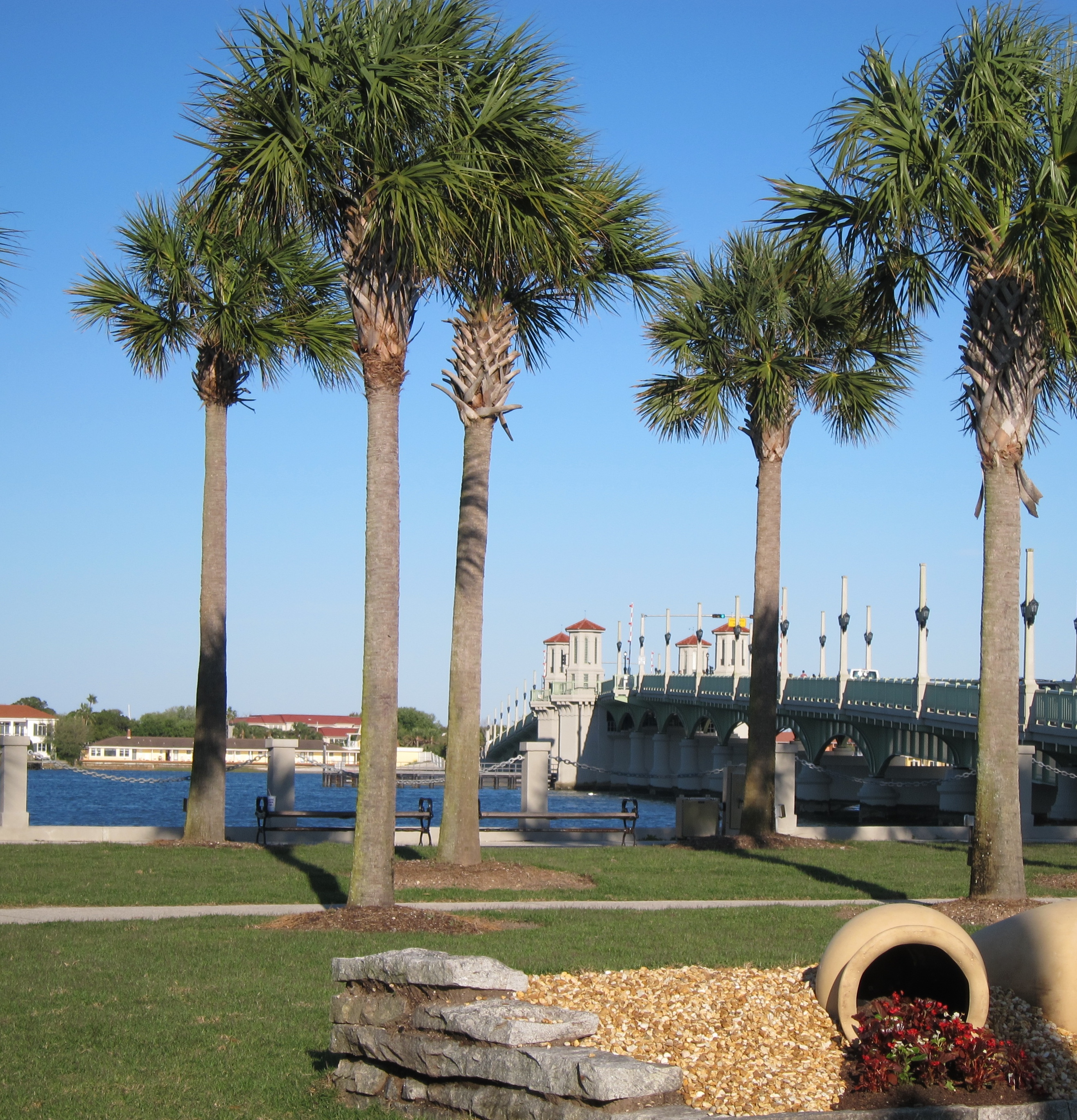
Bridge of Lions, looking eastward to Anastasia Island

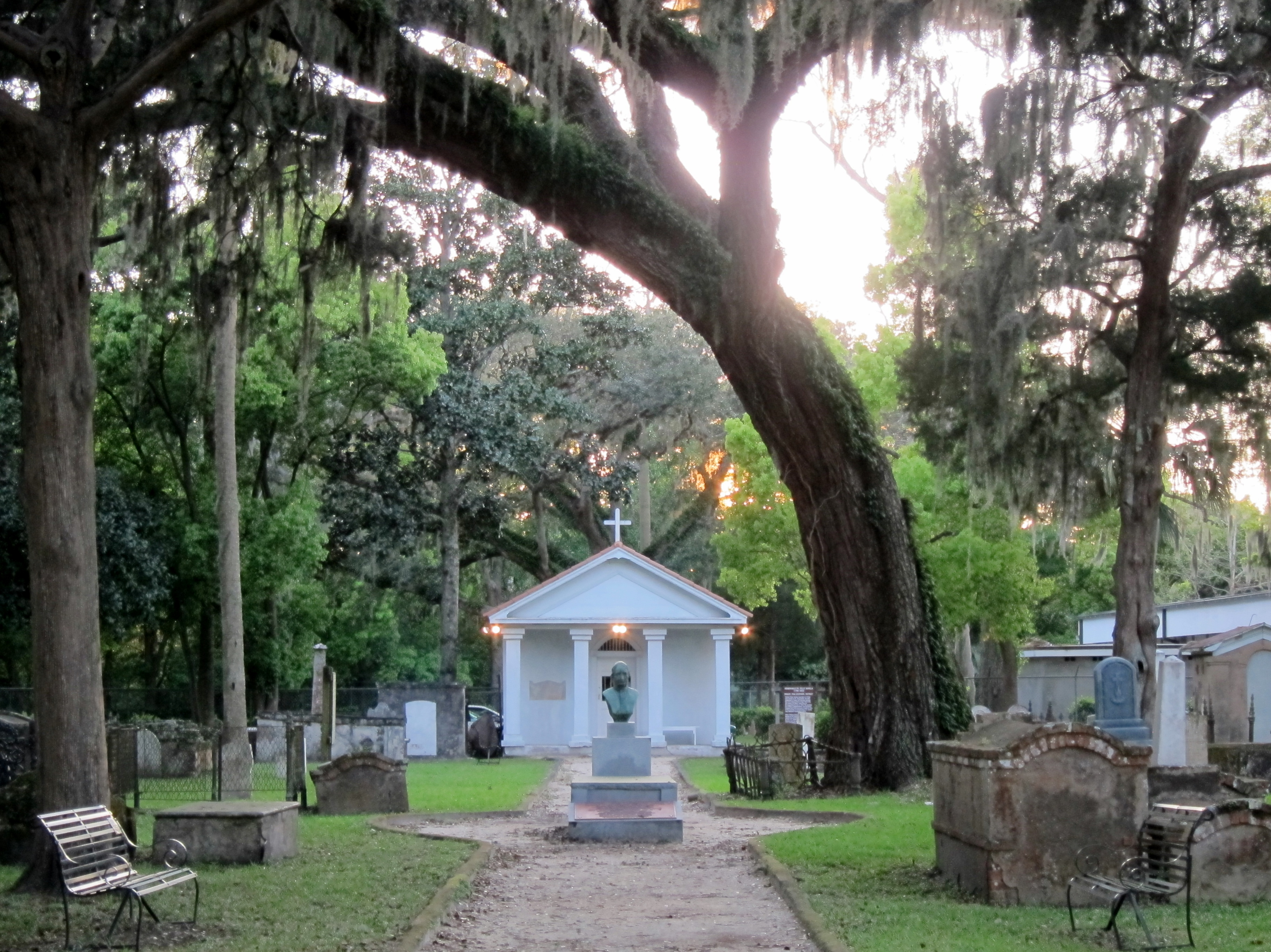
Tolomato Cemetery

== See also ==
- Gálveztown (brig sloop) – ship which played a role in the Gulf Coast campaign of the American Revolutionary War under Bernardo de Gálvez, and its replica built recently in Spain anticipating the 450th anniversary of St. Augustine's founding (1565–2015).
- St. Augustine movement
