= Old Town Trolley Tours of St. Augustine =

Tour bus company

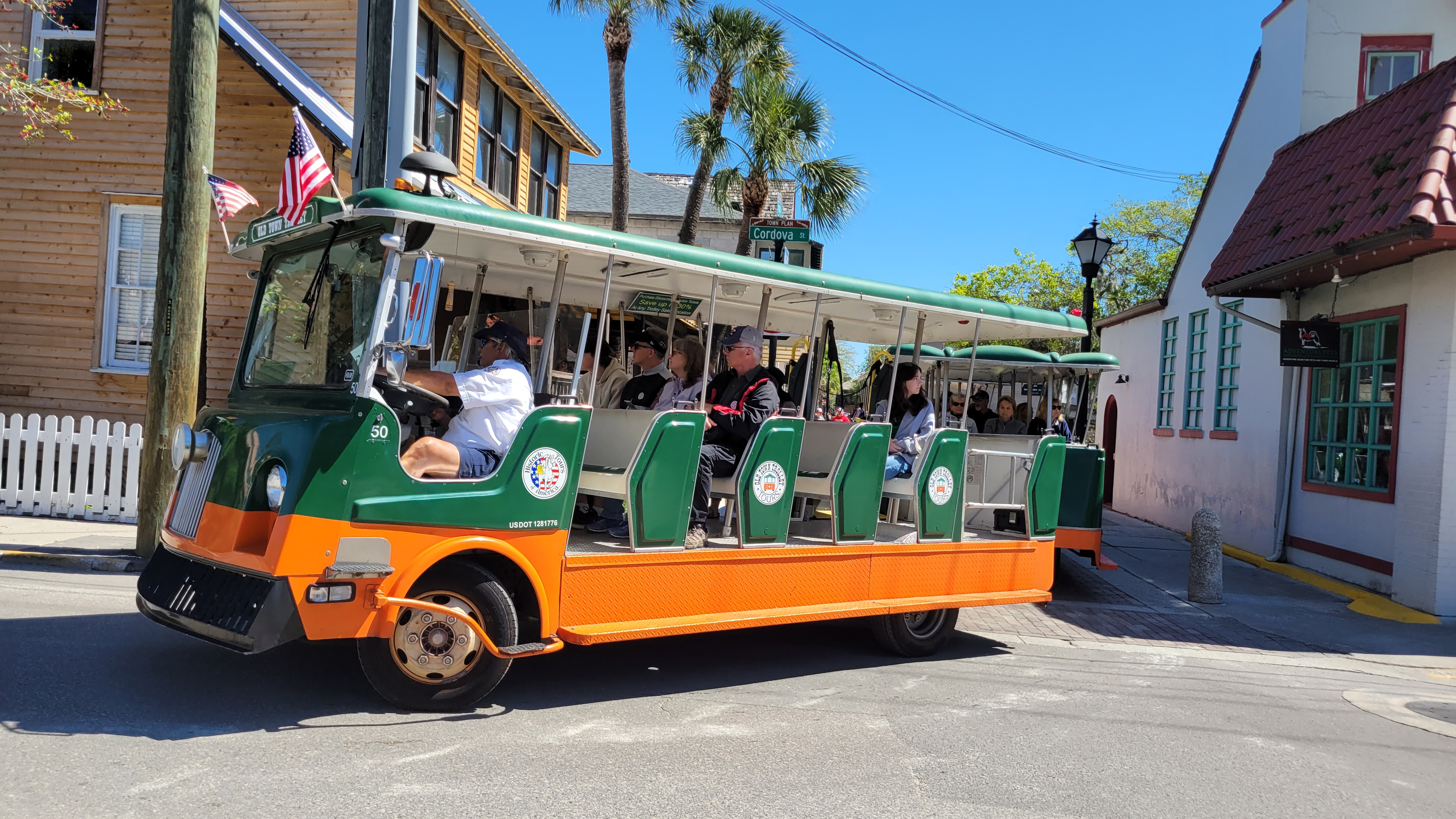
- Old Town Trolley Tours on Cordova Street
- Parent: Historic Tours of America, Inc.
- Founded: Company founded in 1970s by Chris Belland, Moe Mosher, Ed Swift; Old Town Trolley Tours of St. Augustine founded 2001
- Headquarters: Corporate headquarters Key West, Florida, U.S.; Old Town Trolley Tours of St. Augustine headquarters in St. Augustine, Florida, U.S.
- Locale: St. Augustine, Florida
- Service area: Various cities in U.S.; locally in St. Augustine, Anastasia Island, Vilano Beach, two beaches north of Vilano Beach
- Service type: Hop on, hop off tour bus
- Routes: St. Augustine (Trolley Route), Anastasia Island (Beach Bus Route)
- Stops: 22 in St. Augustine, approximately 6 on Beach Bus Route
- Destinations: St. Augustine area
- Hubs: 1
- Stations: 1
- Chief executive: Chris Belland
- Website: http://www.trolleytours.com

Old Town Trolley Tours of St. Augustine is one of the two large tour bus companies in St. Augustine, Florida, United States. Its buses have pneumatic tires.

== History ==
In the early 1970s, Chris Belland, Mo Mosher, and Ed Swift combined efforts to restore historic storefronts in Key West, Florida. They saw that an increasing number of tourists were coming to the area and started Old Town Trolley tours to provide tours for visitors. They started with a converted bread truck and a homemade trailer. By the 1980s, they were able to buy completely new equipment and they started touring trolleys in various cities, including Boston, Nashville, San Diego, Savannah, St. Augustine, and Washington, D.C. The St. Augustine touring trolleys, the latest of the various city tours, were added in 2001.
