= The Wobbly Toms =

Music group from Saint Augustine, Florida

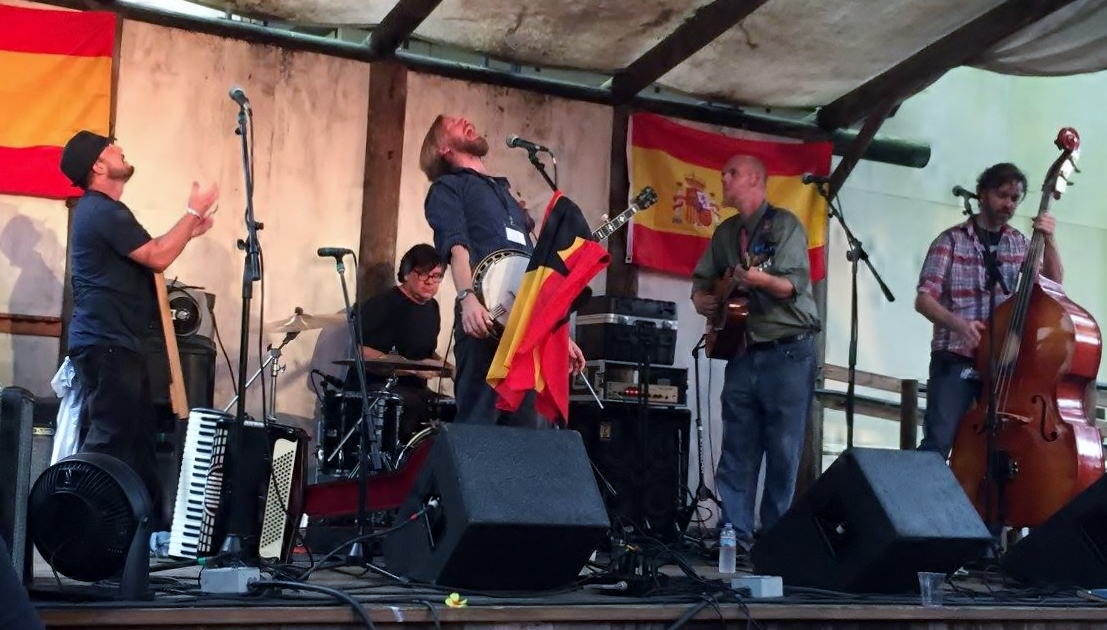
- 450th Celebration St. Augustine, Florida

Background information
- Origin: St. Augustine, Florida
- Years active: December 2003–present
- Members: Richard Steinmeyer; Andy Calvert; Zach Lively; Travis Hembree; Tony Kistka; Christiana Patterson
- Website: The Wobbly Toms home page

The Wobbly Toms is a music group from Saint Augustine, Florida. Beginning in 2003, the band's line-up includes: Andy Calvert (vocals, bass), Richard Steinmeyer (vocals, banjo), Zach Lively (vocals, guitar, harmonica), Travis Hembree (accordion, washboard), Tony Kistka (drums), and Christiana Patterson (violin). In December 2012, The Wobbly Toms released their first studio EP, titled Panic in the Old Town Tonight! produced by Lucio Rubino at The Fish Tank Recording Studio. "Their unique music is described as a St. Augustine mix of age-old traditional music, bluegrass music, folk music, gypsy punk, and American pub rock." The Wobbly Tom's have developed a large following in Northeast Florida because of their unique musical mixture and multi-instrumental talent. Their music is self-stated as "feel good music."

== Appearances ==
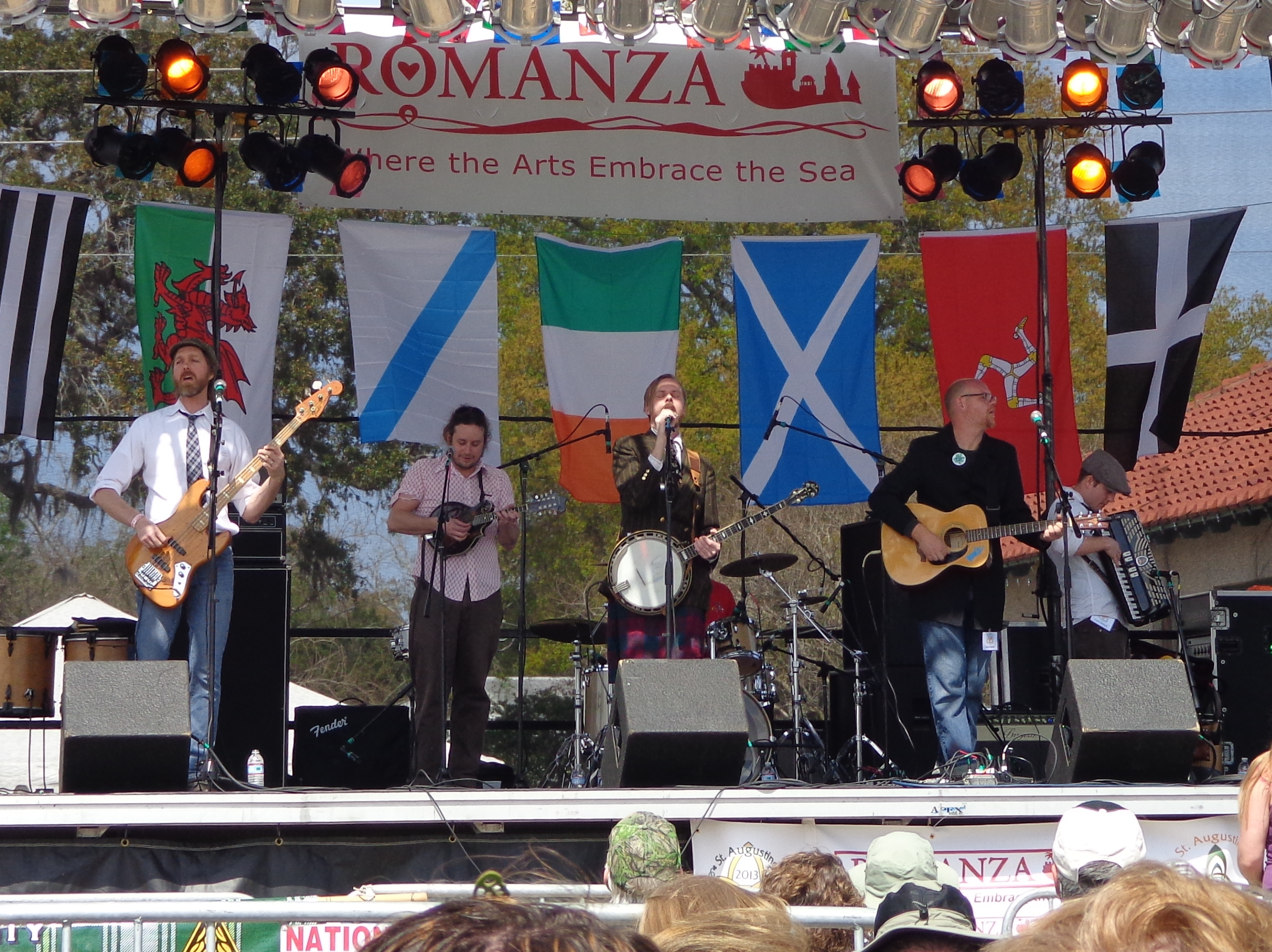
The Wobbly Toms performing at The St. Augustine Celtic Music & Heritage Festival 2013

"The band is part of our life," Steinmeyer said. "The band keeps me sane. I have a job because I have to make money...but this is what I do."

— Richard Steinmeyer, January, 2010.

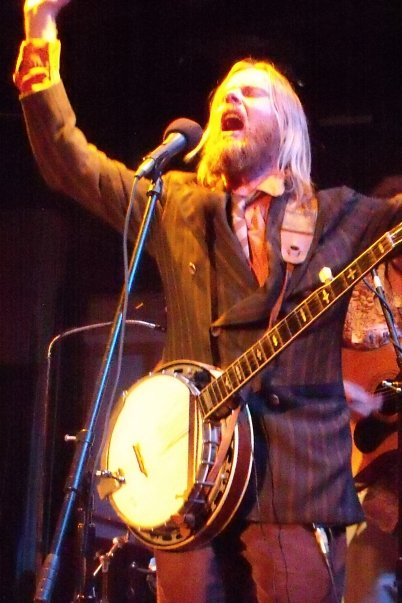
Richard from The Wobbly Toms

- The Wobbly Toms perform annually at The St Augustine Celtic Music and Heritage Festival with international performers including: Hevia, Albannach (band), The Tannahill Weavers, Rathkeltair, Dublin City Ramblers, Spade McQuade & The Allstars, Scuttered the Bruce, and Strumstick. "The festival is presented by Romanza, and honors St Augustine’s Celtic heritage, dating back to its founding in 1565. St Augustine, Florida is the first and oldest Celtic City in all the Americas." The week-long festival is arguably one of the finest international collaborations of Celtic music and art ever seen in the United States.
- In 2011, The Wobbly Toms performed in Saint Augustine, FL with Langhorne Slim and the Law and at the Ponte Vedra Concert Hall with Al Stewart. During 2012, The Wobbly Toms performed with The Reverend Peyton's Big Damn Band.
- Since 2012 The Wobbly Toms have performed in Saint Augustine, FL at the Gamble Rogers Folk Festival. "Florida lost Gamble Rogers on October 10, 1991, when he gave up his own life while trying to save a drowning man. Although Gamble may be gone, his spirit and wisdom live on in his music and in his stories that are celebrated during the festival in his hometown of St. Augustine.".
- In 2013 The Wobbly Toms performed at the St. Augustine Amphitheatre for "Party At the Plaza" Kijiji International Dialysis Benefit, and 100% of all the funds raised went towards buying medical supplies for their new clinic.
- On September 14, 2013, The Wobbly Toms performed at the St. Augustine City Hall Stage as part of The Gentlemen of the Road Tour along with regional performers including the Grammy Award winning Del McCoury Band.

The Saint Augustine Stopover featured Mumford and Sons, Edward Sharpe and the Magnetic Zeros, John Fogerty, The Vaccines, The Walkmen, Justin Townes Earle, Thao & The Get Down Stay Down, Half Moon Run, Those Darlins, Willy Mason, Bear's Den, and Yacht Club Djs.

- In April 2015 The Wobbly Toms performed at the Limelight Theater of St. Augustine for "Music in the Box." The monthly showcase of music is held in the 75-seat Koger-Gamache Studio Theatre, an intimate black box space. Limelight Theater is at 11 Old Mission Ave., uptown St. Augustine.
- On August 22, 2015, The Wobbly Toms performed at the second annual Joy Moja Jam Fest. The event was held at Ancient City Brewing, Co. in Saint Augustine, FL. All event proceeds went to benefit Joy Moja, a St. Augustine–based nonprofit organization that sells products handmade by artisans in Tanzania. Money made from the sale of products provides educational opportunities and funds education projects in their communities. Tanzania is a developing country on the east coast of Africa. Its future lies in the hands of its children, most of whom lack educational opportunities.
- In January 2020 The Wobbly Toms were voted "Best band – Original Music" in The Folio Weekly Best Of St. Augustine Poll

== Discography ==
Year	Title	Label
2012	Panic in the Old Town Tonight!	Wobbly Songs UnLtd.
2011	Everybody Happy!	Wobbly Songs UnLtd.
