= González-Jones House =

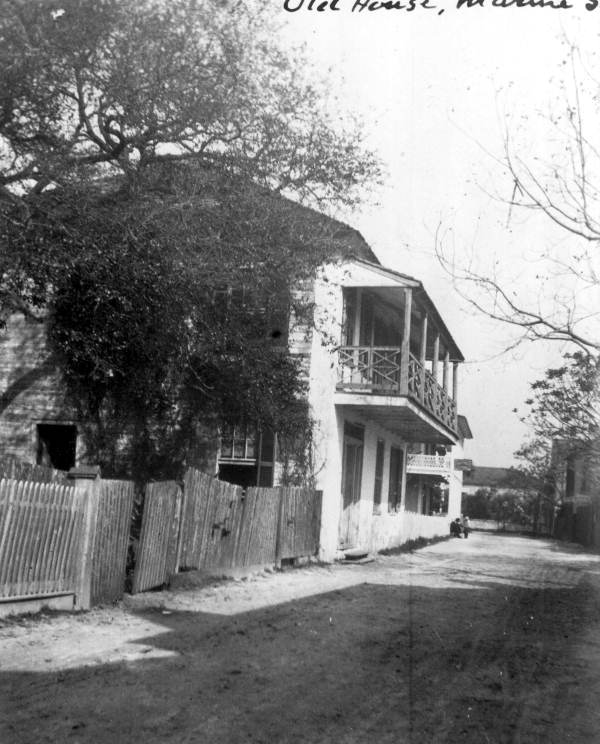
González-Jones House at 56 Marine Street in Saint Augustine Florida in 1902, facing north

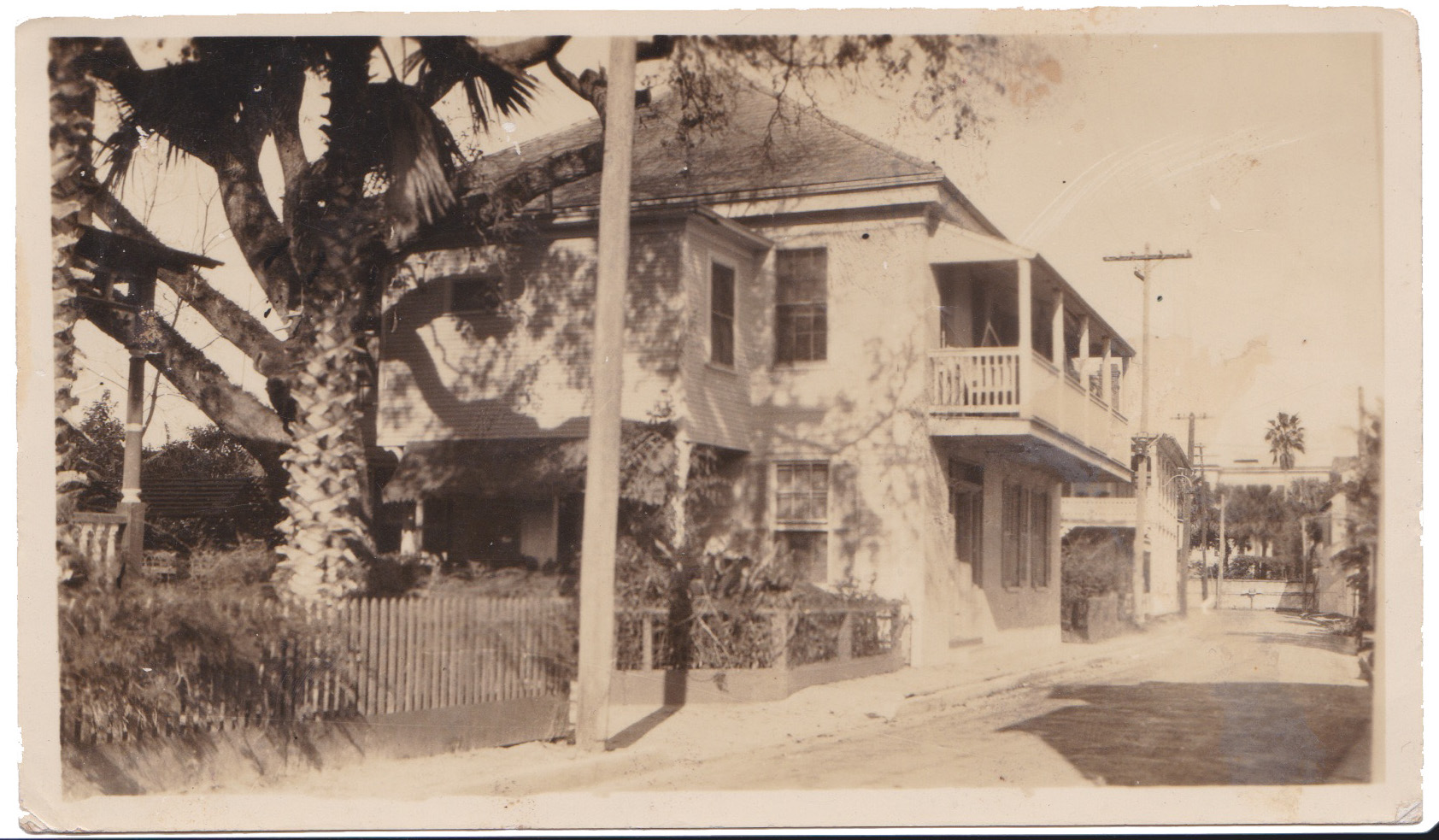
González-Jones House at 56 Marine Street in Saint Augustine Florida around 1910, facing north

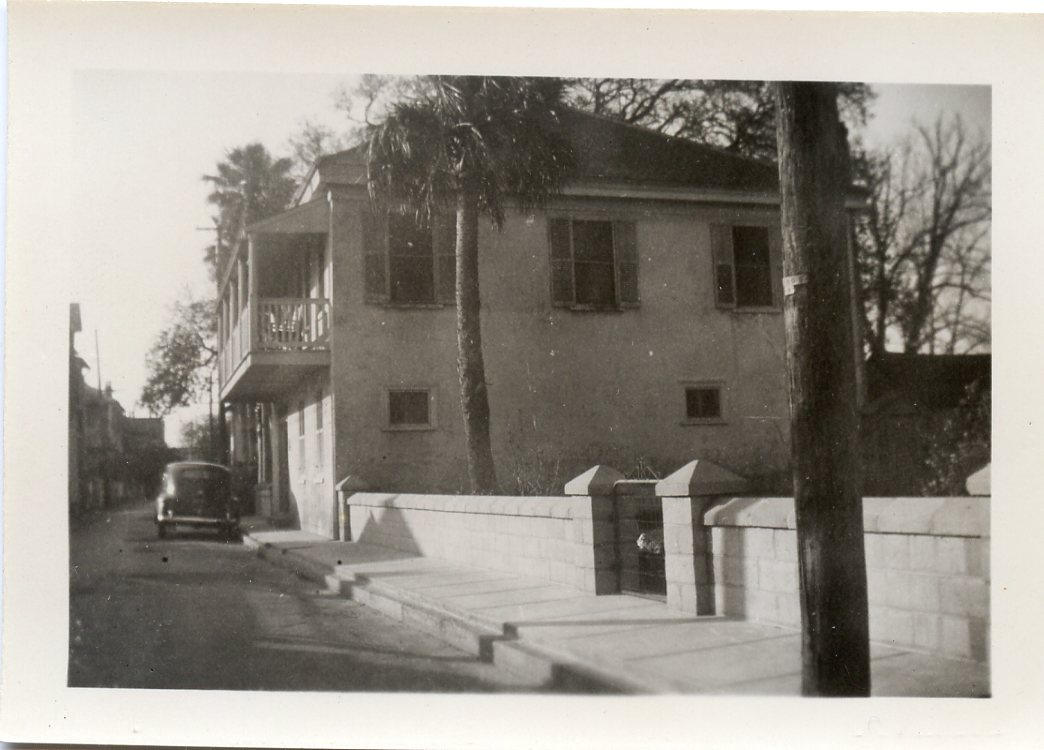
González-Jones House at 56 Marine Street in Saint Augustine Florida in 1946, facing south

The González-Jones House is a historic home built during the First Spanish Period (1565–1763) in Saint Augustine, Florida. It is located at 56 Marine Street, one block north of the González–Alvarez House (14 Saint Francis) and the Saint Francis Barracks (82 Marine). This neighborhood includes nine colonial structures that survive in clusters along Marine and Saint Francis Streets. These buildings are all assumed to have been built after 1702, when the city was destroyed during a British siege.

== Owners and Residents ==
The house at 56 Marine is first named for Juan Ignacio González who owned a home of stone on the site before 1763, when it was included in Juan José Elixio de la Puente's map of the city made during the transition to British rule after the Seven Years' War.

During the Second Spanish Period (1784–1821), the owner was Francisco Xavier Sánchez, the cattle rancher father of José Simeon Sánchez. The Sánchez family's children and grandchildren owned three houses on the north end of the block including the Long-Sánchez House, a historic structure at 43 Marine Street.

Another prominent family in this neighborhood were the Minorcan colonists Roque Leonardy and Agueda Coll. After abandoning the colony at New Smyrna, Florida, the Leonardys established an orchard in this vicinity, and lived on Bridge Street between Saint George and Hospital Streets during 1784-1801. Their sons Juan and Bartolome Leonardy had children who lived in at least three properties on the east side of Marine Street prior to the Civil War. One of these families was Laureanna Leonardy (Bartolome's daughter) and her husband, a Norwegian immigrant named William Monson (Anton Bengt Osmundsen). They lived at 67 Marine Street (sometimes called the Monson-Pinkham House) from 1840 until purchasing the one-story structure across the street at 56 Marine in 1858.

This one family—with the names Monson, Pacetty, and Jones—occupied the house for the next 124 years.

Monson was a carpenter at a cabinetry firm called Monson & Nelligan, located at the NW corner of Cathedral and Saint George near the Government House. He initiated construction of a second level at 56 Marine, but died in 1859 before its completion. The family hired Mathias Leonardy (a cousin) and Cristobal Bravo (the future war-era mayor of Saint Augustine) to complete the work. Eventually, Leonardy and Bravo sued the Monsons for failure to pay the contract, the settlement of which included the Monsons selling a young African slave.

Descendants of William Monson and Laureanna Leonardy lived at 56 Marine Street for 120 years. They included Amelia Louisa Monson, who was Saint Augustine's oldest resident when she died in 1936 at the age of 96. Her husband was Captain Adolphus Newton Pacetty, who served with the Confederate Navy at the Battle of Mobile Bay, and later was elected sheriff of Saint Johns County. He was proprietor of Capo's Bath House, the iconic round structure that appears in most photographs of the Saint Augustine waterfront between 1885-1914. Like Amelia Monson, Pacetty was a Minorcan descendant, and speculated on land with fellow Minorcan families (Reyes and Usina) in the undeveloped North Beach area, a piece of which today is called Pacetty North Beach.

Amelia Monson's brothers—who also grew up at 56 Marine Street—were William F Monson, a Confederate veteran and architect/builder of several extant buildings in Mandarin, Florida, and Anthony Vincent "Bossy" Monson, who established the Monson House, a tourist hotel at 24 Bay Street that was destroyed and rebuilt several times. In 1964, the Monson Motor Lodge (on the same site, but under different ownership) became a landmark of the Civil Rights Movement.

When Amelia and Adolphus Pacetty's two daughters married, their husbands became residents in the house. With the birth of grandchildren between 1896–1906, 56 Marine Street sheltered as many as eleven total people including seven adults—despite being built with only three bedrooms. Among these residents were Ellen Pacetty and her husband, Harry Jones (a Jacksonville, Florida transplant), who formally purchased the property from Amelia Monson while Monson was still a resident there. The Jones' had four daughters: Charlotte, Mabel, Harriette, and Mildred, who worked mostly for the Florida East Coast Railway.

The second name of the Gonzalez-Jones House is derived primarily from these grandchildren, three of whom lived their entire lives at 56 Marine Street. The last full-time resident was Mabel Jones who died in 1975.

The Jones family sold the house in 1982 and it has been extensively remodeled.

== Chain of Title ==
- 1763 appears on Puente map
- 1768 granted by British authority to Robert Bisset, seven days later sold to John Fairland
- 1778 John Fairland to Thomas Hall, who sold later same year to Archibald Brown
- 1785 Archibald Brown to Francisco Sánchez
- 1802 Francisco Sánchez to Jose Dulcet
- 1858 Mary Dulcet Clarke (deceased) to William Monson for $185
- 1859 Laureanna Leonardy Monson, inherited from husband
- 1889 Amelia Monson Pacetty, inherited from mother
- 1904 Amelia Monson Pacetty to Harry Jones (her son-in-law); Amelia Monson remained a resident in the house until her death in 1936.
- 1942 Ellen Pacetty Jones, inherted from husband
- 1952 Mabel Helen Jones, inherited from mother
- 1975 Harriet Jones Kirkman, inherited from her sister
- 1982 Harriet Jones Kirkman to Evelyn and Anthony DiFiore

== Site Description ==
In the deed of sale between Sanchez and Clarke, the property was described as "Don Francisco Sanchez (deceased) sells to Jose Dulcet on July 22: a house of stone, two stories, lot on Marine Street to the barracks of Cuba, bounded east by Marine Street 77 varas, on north by house and lot of Antonio Llambias, 53 varas, west by Don Miguel O'Reilly, 73 varas, south by house and lot that came to Sanchez with others by the death of Doña Maria Evans (Hudson), 50-1/2 varas, formerly belonging to Don Jose Lorente." In addition the Charlotte Street property cited in the deed, O'Reilly lived in a historic house a few blocks north at 131 Aviles Street, current site of the Father Miguel O'Reilly House Museum. Mary Evans Hudson was Saint Augustine's best known midwife and had her life fictionalized by Eugenia Price in the novel Maria, published in 1977.

In the sale from Clarke to Monson, the property was: "Lot bounded on the east by Marine Street, on the south by the lands of Matias Leonardy, on the west by Juan Llambias, and on the north by Antonio Llambias." Leonardy was the first cousin of Monson's wife, Laureana Leonardy, and later was involved in the second floor renovation. Llambias was a member of the family that owned another colonial era house in the neighborhood, the Fernandez-Llambias House at 31 Saint Francis.

In his memoir about visiting his aunts in Florida, Sonny Kirkman of High Point, North Carolina, described the Jones House as it looked in the 1930s.

56 Marine was a large, square, two-story house, which sat with only the sidewalk between it and the street. There was a covered porch that ran completely across the front of the second floor and protruded out over the sidewalk below. The porch had a swing and three rocking chairs. The house on the other side of the street had a clear side yard which allowed a view of Bay Street, the sea wall, the Matanzas River, and Davis Shores on the other side.

The layout was square with four rooms on each of the two floors. The large wooden front door opened into a foyer. On the left of the foyer, along the south wall, was a flight of steps leading to the second floor. One could turn right into a parlor (the NE corner) or walk straight ahead into a dining room (SW corner). The kitchen was the NW corner of the first floor accessible from the dining room, and had a door to the backyard. On the second floor, there was a railing around the south stair opening, and a hall that ran beside the stairway to the front of the house. A central sitting room had a door onto the front porch. There was an entry door to both the NE bedroom and to the NW bedroom from the sitting room. The entry to the SW bedroom was through a door at the top of the stairs. Harry Jones added an indoor bathroom on stilts off the south side of the house, which was accessible from a door at the top of the stairs.

The Jones owned the north lot which provided a large side yard, and a smaller yard with a driveway and garage on the south side.

== Leonardy Legacy ==
Despite a street being named for the Leonardy family in West Saint Augustine, the Leonardys in fact dominated this south neighborhood between Bridge and Saint Francis Streets beginning with their arrival in 1777. According to the Saint Augustine City Directories, the descendants of Roque Leonardy and Agueda Coll occupied four different houses in a single block of Marine Street for a period of more than two centuries. Juan Leonardy's grandchildren and great grandchildren lived at 63 Marine Street until at least 1924. Another Juan Leonardy grandchild, Kate Leonardy (who married Will Desselberger) was a resident of 53 Marine Street until at least 1914. Juan's brother was Bartolome Leonardy whose daughter Laureanna Leonardy lived for eighteen years at 67 Marine Street, a house which was later owned into the 20th century by William Slade Pinkham, who was her nephew. After Bartolome's death (1844), his widow, Antonia Paula Bonelly, lived with family in several of these houses. She died at 56 Marine Street in 1870. The other five siblings of Juan and Bartolome Leonardy did not settle in Saint Augustine, but were instead among the earliest pioneers of Tampa, Florida, where they ventured with the assistance of Adolphus Pacetty in 1855.
