= 1964 Monson Motor Lodge protests =

Series of events during the civil rights movement

1964 Monson Motor Lodge protest
- Part of St. Augustine movement in the Civil Rights Movement
- James Brock pouring acid into his pool
- Date: June 18, 1964
- Location: Monson Motor Lodge; St. Augustine, Florida
- Caused by: Civil Rights Bill debates in congress; Racial segregation in Florida
- Goals: Desegregation
- Result: Arrest of protesters; Immediate backlash against civil rights protests; Later desegregation; Ku Klux Klan firebombing of the Monson Motor Lodge

Parties
Protesters: Reform Rabbis; Southern Christian Leadership Conference (SCLC)	Segregationists: Off-duty police officers

Lead figures
Albert Vorspan; Hosea Williams; Israel S. Dresner	James Brock

A civil rights protest occurred on June 18, 1964, at the Monson Motor Lodge in St. Augustine, Florida. The campaign between June and July 1964 was led by Robert Hayling, Martin Luther King Jr., Ralph Abernathy, Andrew Young, Hosea Williams, C. T. Vivian and Fred Shuttlesworth, among others. St. Augustine was chosen to be the next battleground against racial segregation on account of it being both highly racist yet also relying heavily on the northern tourism dollar. Furthermore, the city was due to celebrate its 400th anniversary the following year, which would heighten the campaign's profile even more. Nightly marches to the slave market were organized; marchers were regularly attacked and beaten.

At the same time in the U.S. Senate, the Civil Rights Act of 1964 was being filibustered. On June 10, the filibuster collapsed. The following day, King was arrested in St. Augustine. King had attempted to be served lunch at the Monson Motor Lodge, but the owner, James Brock—who was also the president of the St. Augustine Hotel, Motel, and Restaurant Owners Association—refused to serve him. King was arrested for trespassing and jailed; while imprisoned, he wrote a letter to Israel Dresner, a leading Reform rabbi, urging him to recruit rabbis to come to St. Augustine and take part in the movement. This they did, and, at another confrontation at the Monson, 17 rabbis were arrested on June 18. This was the largest mass arrest of rabbis in American history. At the same time, a group of black and white activists—protesters who had arrived from Albany, Georgia—named J.T. Johnson, Brenda Darten, and Mamie Nell Ford, jumped into the Monson's swimming pool. Brock appeared to pour muriatic acid into the pool to burn the protesters. Photographs of this, and of a policeman jumping into the pool in everything but his shoes to arrest them, made headline news around the world.

After the Civil Rights Act had been passed, St. Augustine businesses—particularly in the restaurant and culinary trades—were slow at desegregating. Eventually, the courts forced Brock and his colleagues to integrate their businesses, and soon after he did, the Monson was firebombed by the Ku Klux Klan (KKK), who violently opposed desegregation. The state judge was unsympathetic to his predicament, however, feeling that Brock and his colleagues had brought the violence of the KKK upon themselves; they had taken advantage of it while it was in their favor, and could not stop it now that it was not.

On June 30, Florida Governor Farris Bryant announced the formation of a biracial committee to restore interracial communication in St. Augustine. Although the Civil Rights Act had passed, there were further problems for both Brock personally and Florida particularly. He had been repeatedly refused bank loans to pay for the damage caused by the firebombing, and declared himself bankrupt the following year. Also in 1965, although the city celebrated its quadricentennial, there was still a palpable underlying racial tension; the tourist trade had been badly damaged and it has been estimated that St. Augustine lost millions of dollars in tourism. Hotels, motels, and restaurants were especially badly hit.

== Background ==
=== SCLC planning ===
St. Augustine, Florida, a beautiful town and our nation's oldest city, was the scene of raging tempers, flaring violence, and the most corrupt coalition of segregationist opposition outside of Mississippi. It was a stronghold of the Ku Klux Klan and the John Birch Society. There the Klan made a last-ditch stand against the nonviolent movement. They flocked to St. Augustine's Slave Market Plaza from all across north Florida, Georgia, and Alabama. Klansmen abducted four Negroes and beat them unconscious with clubs, ax handles, and pistol butts...St. Augustine was a testing ground. Can the Deep South change? Could southern states maintain law and order in the face of change? Could local citizens, black and white, work together to make democracy a reality throughout America?

— Martin Luther King on St. Augustine, Florida

The Southern Christian Leadership Conference (SCLC) had decided to renew their campaign against segregation, and give "new dignity to the movement". (Note: The SCLC leadership was particularly concerned with a recent trend for young blacks to defend themselves physically from white racists and matching violence with violence, and intended the St. Augustine campaign "to demonstrate to blacks throughout the country that nonviolence was a much more effective instrument for change".) The leadership was originally divided on where to target. James Bevel, for example, wanted to focus on one state—Alabama—whereas Hosea Williams advocated the Floridian seaside holiday town of St. Augustine. St. Augustine was approaching its 400th anniversary. (Note: Known as the "Ancient City", St. Augustine had been founded in 1565 by the Spanish conquistador Pedro Menéndez de Avilés. It is the oldest continuously occupied settlement of European origin in the contiguous United States. It is the second-oldest continuously inhabited city of European origin in United States territory after San Juan, Puerto Rico (founded in 1521). Johnson's government had pledged 3633315 to the town to help finance the celebrations and restore its architectural ruins.) Although much smaller than previous civil rights battlegrounds, such as Birmingham, Alabama, it was no less—and probably more—violently segregated, argues author Jim Bishop. Unlike Birmingham, racial power lay not with the mayor and chief of police, he says, but in:

Herbert E. Wolfe, banker and bigwig in the Democratic Party; it was the St. Augustine Record, a mirror for white faces; it was an organization called the Ancient City Hunting Club, composed of rifle experts who sometimes made a sport of hunting two-legged "coons." Politics was divided between two political groups: the far right and the ultra-far right. Anyone who was plain right risked being called a Communist.

=== Choosing of St. Augustine ===
For King—recently named Time Magazine's Man of the Year—it was his preferred choice of "non-violent battlefield" for "expos[ing] Klan savagery to the eyes of the world". It was a highly segregated town, argues the author Thomas E. Jackson, and its celebrations would be restricted to whites only. It was deliberately chosen, continues Jackson, as it had "a business elite vulnerable to negative publicity because it was dependent on northern tourist dollars, a police force with close ties to the Klan, and a reputation for brutal extralegal violence". Social ethicist and theologian Gary Dorrien has described St. Augustine as Florida's "most violently racist city...a Klan stronghold policed by unabashedly racist thugs", where "Blacks who tried to enroll their children in public schools got their homes bombed". scholar Stephen B. Oates says of St. Augustine's law enforcement: However, suggests Webb, this was known to be a dangerous strategy. The Florida Advisory Committee to the United States Commission on Civil Rights informed them that St. Augustine was a "segregated superbomb...with an extremely short fuse".

Here Sheriff L. O. Davis, "a buffoonish, burly, thuggish man", employed an auxiliary force of one hundred deputies, many of them prominent Klansmen, to "keep the niggers in line." Here barrel-chested Hoisted "Hoss" Manucy, dressed in cowboy paraphernalia, led a bunch of Klan-style bullyboys who called themselves the Ancient City Gun Club. They patrolled the county in radio cars with Confederate flags on their antennas. harassing Negroes at will. Manucy boasted that he had no vices, that he didn't smoke, drink, or chase women. All he did was "beat and kill niggers."

Law enforcement in St. Augustine, says David Chalmers, can be summed up in the response to the Klansmen who rioted and the blacks who trespassed: the formers' bonds rarely rose above 260, while the latter's could "run into thousands". The Mayor of St. Augustine has been described by scholar L. V. Baldwin as a "biblical fundamentalist who tolerated such lawlessness while insisting that 'God segregated the races when he made the skins a different color'". received advance warning of the SCLC plans, including that protesters would include figures such as Governor Peabody's mother. The Boston Globe asked the mayor whether he had ever heard of her; he had not. When asked what would happen if, during the protests, she violated segregation laws, the mayor replied, "if she comes down and breaks the law, we are going to arrest her".

=== James Brock ===
David Garrow has described Brock as "a relative moderate" in the St. Augustine business community, although he was personally a segregationist. Warren, similarly, has said that Brock was "a decent man caught between the violence of the Klan and the unwillingness of community leaders to find meaningful ways to end segregation", while Colburn says he was usually gregarious and "rather mild-mannered, religious man who suddenly found himself thrust" into a civil rights struggle. Chalmers suggests that, while he was willing to desegregate, "he dare not be the first". Brock later explained his position as he saw it: "if I integrated, there wouldn't be more than one Negro a month registered at the motel, but the first night I integrated, all my windows would be busted in".

== Prelude ==
=== Beginning the campaign ===
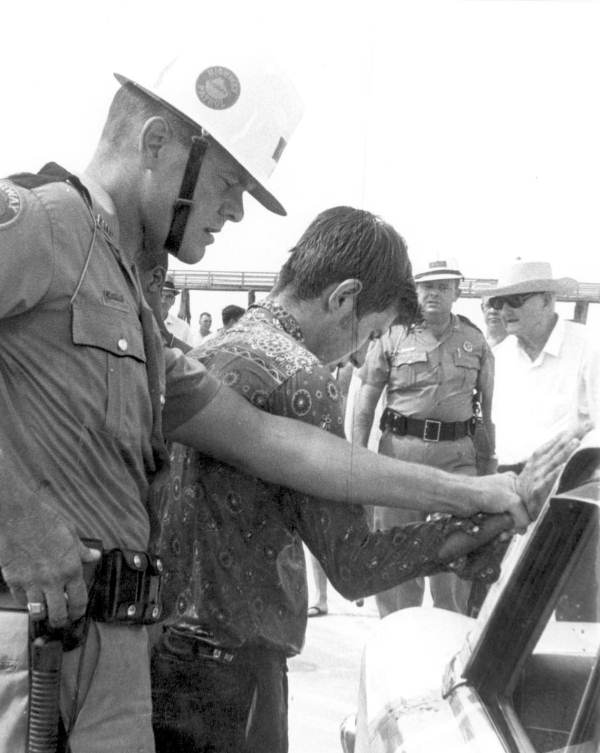
A segregationist being arrested, June 1964; their bail bond was usually a fraction of their opponents'.

The campaign in St. Augustine effectively began on Easter Sunday, March 29, 1964, and was deliberately aimed at the city's food and tourism industries, which, argues sociologist Ralph C. Scott, "were as much about race as they were about national and class privilege". This was also the first, but not last, time that the Monson Motor Lodge, at 32 Avenida Menendez—a "big posh lily white" motel—was to be targeted. Monson's was targeted because its owner, James Brock, was not only a prominent local businessman and president of the trade association, but the motel was regularly patronized by reporters, so was felt to provide easy access to the media. An interracial group, which included the 72-year-old mother of Massachusetts' Governor, Endicott Peabody, and the wife of that state's Episcopal Bishop, John Burgess, (Note: Burgess was the first black Episcopal bishop in the United States.) led by Reverend David Robinson, attempted to integrate the motel's restaurant. Peabody and Burgess and 37 others were arrested and the affair made national headlines. The mayor condemned the protests, not as local discontent over segregation, but the work of "scalawags" from the north. Colburn argues that "the arrest and subsequent imprisonment of this 72-year-old drew the nation's attention to conditions in St. Augustine as no other incident had. It was a watershed in the community's race relations." (Note: Mrs Peabody's husband, notes Colburn, was unsurprised, commenting "that's the kind of thing she always does". Sheriff Davis put a sign behind his desk that read: "St Johns County famous jail. Mrs Peabody of the Boston Peabodys Stayed here two nights Reasonable fines...$35 and up.") It was not long before leading members of the SCLC—Vivian, Williams, Lee, Shuttlesworth and James Bevel—arrived in St. Augustine and launched workshops on non-violent militant protest. Focussing on local businesses, such as the Monson, would, the SCLC concluded, apply fiscal pressure on the business community and persuade the local whites to see the benefit to granting concessions, and by the end of May the motel was subject to almost daily sit ins.

Jackson suggests that, as far as their strategy went, King and the SCLC had learned from the Birmingham campaign of the previous year that "vivid images of confrontation, with black and white protesters putting their bodies on the line against white supremacists moved the nation more effectively than inspired preaching or patient lobbying". To increase pressure on authorities, King and the SCLC turned to "wade-ins" to integrate public pools and beaches. (Note: Analogous to sit-ins in cafes and restaurants, wade-ins had first been used on St. Augustine's beaches in summer 1963.) In retaliation, large numbers of Ku Klux Klan arrived in St. Augustine in droves and commenced drive-by shootings in black neighborhoods, as well as attacking demonstrations with iron bars and bicycle chains. (Note: The KKK was already extremely active in St. Augustine and had made the national media with their kidnapping and beating of a local dentist and activist Robert Hayling. The klansmen were found not guilty of attempted murder; Hayling was found guilty of assaulting them.) By now, argues the historian Michael R. Belnap, St. Augustine was "slipping into chaos". Confrontations occurred by day and night; one occasion, King only narrowly managed to persuade the young men not to go home and fetch their guns; Brun suggests that "had they done so, St. Augustine would have gone down as the most violent racial battle in King's nonviolent movement".

=== Sit-in protest ===
King arrived in St. Augustine on Sunday, May 31, and stayed in Lincolnville, less than a mile from Monson Motor Lodge; Lincolnville was home to prominent leaders of the black community. Apart from St. Augustine, King is known to have visited several other cities in Florida. Such as: Tampa in 1961, Jacksonville and Miami several times. Dorrien posits that he was deliberately kept out of St. Augustine by his colleagues as it was deemed too dangerous to risk his life there.

At a strategy meeting he "spoke of touching white hearts with Christian non-violence". His audience, on the other hand, says Bishop, "wondered if King knew their town": white community leaders knew the SCLC's strategy. They also knew that bigger and stronger cities had eventually come to agreements with King in return for peace on the streets. St. Augustine, though, was "prepared to die on its feet rather than truckle to King", comments Bishop. King had made a tactical decision to get arrested to intensify the struggle. As such, he intended to take part in a sit in at Monson Motor Lodge's, a traditional—and segregated—motel and restaurant overlooking Matanzas Bay. At around 12:20, on June 11, King and his colleagues Ralph Abernathy, Bernard Lee, Clyde Jenkins, Will England, a white chaplain from Boston University, and five others arrived at the Monson for lunch. The SCLC had alerted the press to King's presence and several were there to witness King—who wore a black badge with the word "equal" in white—arrive. The motel manager, James Brock, was also awaiting him on the welcome mat. Brock told his visitors that they were on private property. Although Brock tried to talk privately to King—who introduced himself as "Martin King"—microphones were pushed between them. Newsmen jockeyed for position, amid shouts of "duck your head" and "get that flashgun down".

The delegation attempted to enter the restaurant, but Brock told that the restaurant did not serve blacks. King said they would wait until it did, and some of those with him began a sit in. Brock's and King's conversation was polite. The manager told King and his party, "we can't serve you. We're not integrated." He did state, though, that he would give them entrance should either they present "a federal court order or if a group of St. Augustine businessmen prevail upon me". Their discussion lasted around 15 minutes; Scholar David Colburn describes there being something of a carnival atmosphere to King and Brock's encounter, particularly as King responded with sermon-like replies.

Brock eventually asked King and his party to leave, but, argues Colburn, King "had no intention of leaving. He was there to be arrested." Their conversation ended with Brock beginning to lose his temper, demanding of King, "will you take your nonviolent army somewhere else? I have already had 85 people arrested here." To this King replied, "we'll wait in the hope that the conscience of someone will be aroused". Abernethy asked why Brock had a sign welcoming tourists such as themselves. Brock publicly told King that the only blacks allowed on the premises were servants of white patrons, who allowed them to eat in the service area. In response, King asked Brock, if he understood "the humiliation our people go through". Brock, in turn, appealed to King to see it from his point of view. As a respected local businessman, he argued, it would damage him and his social position if he allowed black people into his restaurant. (Note: Brock was a Rotarian, head of the local Community Chest and president of the local Florida Hotel and Motel Association, among other things.) Asking that King understand Brock's responsibilities to his family, he announced to the gathered reporters "I would like to invite my many friends throughout the country to visit Monson's. We expect to remain segregated."

=== Activist arrests ===
However, says Garrow, Brock was becoming "increasingly exasperated" with the situation, and appears to have called the police. In the meantime, other customers had arrived at the motel and, interrupting Brock' and King's discussion, a white customer asked if the restaurant was open yet. Brock replied in the affirmative, and the customer physically pushed his way through King's party, calling King a black bastard as he did so. At this point, the Chief of police Virgil Stuart and Sheriff L. O. Davis, arrived in possession of arrest warrant for breach of the peace, conspiracy and trespass against King and his colleagues. Brock, says Colburn, "breathed a sigh of relief". King and his companions were arrested under Florida's "unwanted guest" law. Branch describes how, then:

Eight volunteers, including a white woman, stepped forward on Davis's announcement that he would accommodate anyone who wanted to join King in jail. A Negro teenager changed his mind when asked pointedly by Stuart if he were sure.

King and his colleagues refused to post bail, which led automatically to their imprisonment in the crowded St John's County Jail. (Note: Simpson, says Dorrien, "excoriated St. Augustine's concrete sweatboxes, miniature cells, and chicken coops customized for civil rights prisoners: 'Here is exposed, in its raw ugliness, studied and cynical brutality, deliberately contrived to break men physically and mentally'.") Fear of a jailhouse lynching led King to be moved to Jacksonville. Before he was sent there and wishing, says Branch, to "maintain the spirit of the St. Augustine movement", King wrote to Israel "Sy" Dresner in New York, who, as a 1961 Freedom Rider, had supported King on a previous occasion, (Note: They had sung "John the Baptist was a Baptist" in an Albany church together.) requesting him to come to St. Augustine and act as an independent witness to events: King also telegraphed Johnson to tell him that he had witnessed "most complete breakdown of law and order since Oxford, Mississippi". (Note: By which King was referring to the Ole Miss riot of 1962. James Meredith, an African American, was stopped from enrolling at the University of Mississippi, even after the federal courts had ruled that he be admitted. Meredith traveled to Oxford under armed guard to register, but riots by segregationists broke out in protest of his admittance. That night, cars were burned, federal law enforcement was pelted with rocks, bricks and small arms fire, and university property was damaged by 3,000 rioters. Two civilians were killed by gunshot wounds, and the riot spread into adjacent areas of the city of Oxford.)

Dear Sy. I am dictating this letter from the St. Augustine City Jail...Perhaps if this letter could be read to your brethren next week, it might be considered a 'call' to St. Augustine...I would imagine that some 30 or so rabbis would make a tremendous impact on this community and the nation. We would hope that some would be prepared to submit to arrest. (Note: King had already attempted, without success, to persuade celebrities to come to St. Augustine; all had refused, except Marlon Brando, who had written to say he had wanted to but, unfortunately, he had a bleeding ulcer and "great personal strife" to deal with at the time. Chalmers notes that "rabbis and ministers, white students and college professors, and black teenagers went to jail" instead.)

Johnson replied to King's telegram and was keen to know if it pleased King, who was known to have been upset at having heard an unfounded rumor that Johnson was intending to drop his support for the Bill; Johnson also wanted King to know that the White House was in contact with the State Governor. While in prison, says Webb, King also "secretly testified" to a grand jury that he would prevent future night marches if a biracial commission were to be established.

=== Civil Rights Bill debates ===
Furthermore, comments attorney Dan Warren, the Civil Rights Bill filibuster in the Senate had just been ended, and the ensuing maneuvers to delay it yet again by segregationist operators like Rep. Howard Smith of Virginia made King's arrest "particularly timely". The filibuster had gone on for 75 days, (Note: When the bill came before the full Senate for debate on March 30, a bloc southern Democratic Senators and one Republican Senator led by Richard Russell (D-GA) launched a filibuster to prevent its passage. Said Russell: "We will resist to the bitter end any measure or any movement which would have a tendency to bring about social equality and intermingling, and amalgamation of the races in our (Southern) states".) and on the day before King was arrested, the Senate voted for cloture of the debate, the first time in United States history that the Senate had closed down one of its own debates on civil rights; the passage of the bill was now "virtually inevitable". It is possible, argues the scholar James A. Colaiaco that, "had the white population of St. Augustine continued to allow the demonstrators to march unmolested, the protest would have probably died out within a few weeks. But once again, SCLC provoked white racists". However, says Garrow, the situation was about to take "a turn for the worse".

=== Prison release and tensions ===
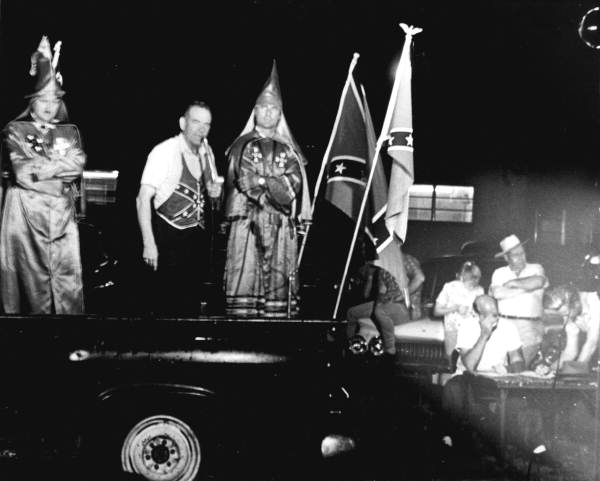
Ku Klux Klan rally in St. Augustine, July 23, 1964: Note Charles Conley Lynch in the Confederate flag vest, holding microphone.

King was released from jail the following day. Looking, according to Hayling, haggard and frightened", he refused to talk about his overnight imprisonment and left St. Augustine immediately, traveling first to Springfield College and Yale University to collect honorary degrees and then to Washington, DC to be photographed with Johnson. King had ensured that "the nation's attention would be focused on the brutal actions of the Klan and the adamant stand elected officials of St. Augustine had taken to prevent demonstrators from protesting segregation". Klan demonstrations continued over the next few days. On the 14th, Klansman, attorney, and leader of the newly founded National States' Rights Party J. B. Stoner spoke before a large crowd at the Slave Market, declaring that "tonight, we're going to find out whether white people have any rights! When the Constitution said all men are created equal, it wasn't talking about niggers. The coons have been parading around St. Augustine for a long time." (Note: Stoner, suggests Chalmers, "whose skills with dynamite and in defending dynamiters gave him particular prestige in Klan circles [although] was not much of an orator".) King was accused of being a "longtime associate" of communism, while the Supreme Court was "Jew-stacked". (Note: Following which, says Colaiaco, "Stoner led a mob of angry whites —bearing Confederate flags and signs reading 'Kill the Civil Rights Bill' and 'Put George Wallace on the Supreme Court'—to the black section of town" where they were accompanied by state troopers and dogs.) Accompanied by local Klan leader Charles Conley Lynch—whose trademark costume, notes Garrow, was a "vest cut from a Confederate battle flag"—Stoner "claimed that African Americans were sexually depraved brutes more closely related to apes than humans...The two men evoked the Lost Cause as a means to rally white males in defense of their wives and daughters".

The same day King was released from jail, a number of city business leaders met at the Monson. These included Herbert E. Wolfe, known as St. Augustine's "One Man Power Structure", four executives from the Fairchild Stratos corporation, and the mayor. The businessmen proposed to the latter that he support the creation of a committee to examine racial tensions in the city. This was not intended to have any black members, although, comments Bishop, "this oversight was called to their attention". The committee was then suggested to be a biracial one. The mayor, however, saw this as surrendering to the SCLC, and refused. The committee was, in any case, not indeed to have to negotiate with King or Abernethy, as it was deliberately phrased as wishing to deal with law-abiding locals. Nor, indeed, did they wish to talk to locals they had not chosen: Hayling, although local, was deemed not to pass the "law-abiding" criterion, having already been arrested.

In the background, an offer had been made by the city authorities to set up a biracial commission comprising five blacks and five whites. This would investigate complaints regarding segregation in return for an end to the demonstrations and mass meetings; it was supported by the SCLC as a fair compromise, and at a secret meeting of St. Augustine businessmen, the new committee was also endorsed. A Grand Jury was due to decide the issue over the next few days.

=== Protest meetings ===
On the evening of Wednesday, June 17, leading Reform Jewish leader Albert Vorspan and 16 colleagues from eight different states joined a mass-meeting in the First Baptist Church, where King "announced their entrance to an enthusiastic crowd". Dresner addressed the crowd—the only member of the delegation with experience of these meetings—in the form of a call and response sermon. (Note: Call and response derives from historical African roots which then entered the American diasporic tradition, and in doing so created a new, unique tradition in the United States. Its use by a Jewish rabbi in a Southern Baptist church "astonished his colleagues... [and] evoked a tumultuous response", says Branch.) The rabbis left the church and followed Fred Shuttlesworth, Andrew Young,—King's deputy in the town—and 300 others on a long march to the old St. Augustine Slave Market, which historian Clive Webb calls a "symbolic focus of protest" in St. Augustine. (Note: Nightly marches to the Slave Market, originally the idea of Hosea Williams, had become a regular occurrence and often led to violence. On May 28, notes the rabbi and author Marc Schneier, "as Andrew Young led a column of marchers, they were set upon by Klansmen wielding chains and iron pipes. Local police looked on while Young was beaten unconscious. Newspapers and television stations ran pictures of the beating." King saw night marches as a method of increasing the "creative tension" that would attract and hold the attention of the rest of the country. Notes Colaiaco, "Sheriff Davis told Young and other black leaders: 'We are declaring martial law. You had no permit for the earlier marches, and no permits will be given for other marches'. SCLC had fomented the 'creative tension' they needed".) and then to the Monson Motel. The rabbis dispersed to the local homes where they were being billeted, while King and his colleagues discussed strategy. Branch argues that it was originally Hosea Williams' idea to launch an integration against a swimming pool, with the aim of maintaining popular momentum. However, "Williams suffered a ribbing when he refused to lead one of his own wild schemes...Williams admitted he could not swim".

== Protest ==
=== Protesters enter the motel ===
Shuttlesworth and C. T. Vivian led a group of around 50 supporters to Downtown's Monson Motor Lodge at about 12:40 pm. King observed the operation from a waterfront park over the road; Again, Brock met the integrated group at the doors and again announced his was a segregated business. By now, suggests Colburn, the almost daily marches to and trespasses on his business—combined with equal pressure from segregationists not to surrender—had worn away Brock's usual calm and pleasant demeanor, leaving him irritable and short-tempered. He had also received death threats. (Note: Following one march on his motel, his mother-in-law had had a heart attack.) Warren has described it as being a "rather comical scene, arranged primarily for its news value", particularly due to Brock's "frantic, comical antics". Described by Branch as "normally a bookish and controlled businessman", Brock locked the doors on the group on their arrival at 12:40 pm. (Note: Bookish, says Branch, to the extent that he "routinely showed reporters an office adding machine with his precise tabulation of integrationists arrested at Monson's, standing thus far at 239".)

=== Jewish prayers ===
In an attempt to distract the motel authorities from the activists' plans at the rear of the building, Rabbi Israel S. Dresner led 15 colleagues in an open-air Hebrew prayer meeting in the parking lot. The rabbis requested Brock to allow them to enter his restaurant and eat, which he refused. He appears to have begun losing his temper when, on his refusal, the rabbis knelt to pray in his car park for him. At this, Brock—a Baptist deacon and a superintendent of the local Sunday School—lost control. By now, the police were on the scene, and Branch describes Brock as pushing each kneeling rabbi, one at a time, towards them to be arrested.

=== Protesters enter pool ===
In the meantime, SCLC activists Al Lingo and J. T. Johnson, leading a group of supporters, attempted an integration: this time, a "dive-in". Again, the press had been alerted. Seven minutes after the rabbis' arrival at the front door, shouts from the swimming pool drew everyone. There, they saw a number of young people swimming together, both black and white, three men and two women.Two white activists, both possessing room keys, indicating they were guests, stated that they had invited friends to use the pool, as they believed to be within their rights.

=== Brock's reaction to protesters ===
News cameras began rolling. Brock told the white swimmers "you're not putting these people in my pool", and—"with exaggerated gusto", suggests Warren—went to his office and brought out a 2 US gallons (7.6 L) drum of hydrochloric acid and poured it into the pool. This was a cleaning fluid, and Brock was "screaming that he would burn them out", comments Branch. (Note: This was a harmless threat, suggests Branch, as hydrochloric acid was a "relatively harmless" cleaning fluid that Brock had available, although in a high enough concentration it can damage human tissue and organs.) Brock also yelled that he was "cleaning the pool", a presumed reference to it now being, in his eyes, racially contaminated. Another report states that he also allowed an alligator into the pool.

=== Crowding and Dr. King's arrival ===
As they attempted to leave the pool, members of the straining crowd shouted numerous threats, including to shoot, stone, or drown the swimmers and called for dogs. Police held them back. By then, suggests Branch, both police and civilians were "enraged at the sight of the intermingled wet bodies" and the audacity of it. Brock appears to have "lost his cool", and, weeping, shouted "I can't stand it, I can't stand it". King and his party approached the motel only to be surrounded by hecklers. Hosea Williams later recalled wanting to "get the hell out of there" and feared that, on account of his being unable to swim, they were going to throw him in the pool.

=== Arrest of protesters ===
Brock's attempt to force the protesters out did not work, and, impatient at the slow progress the swimmers were making in leaving the pool, Officer James Hewitt announced that they were all under arrest. An off-duty policeman, Officer Henry Billitz, jumped in—except for his shoes still fully clothed—in an attempt at dragging them out himself; he beat them up as well. Then-state attorney Dan R. Warren (Note: Warren was, at the time, one of those working on the Grand Jury's report that at this point was expected to appoint a biracial committee comprising five whites and five blacks.) later wrote how, from his office in the courthouse, he heard a "near riot" taking place from the motel, which was "only a block away". By now, there were over 100 people watching by the poolside. Colburn speculates that the SCLC's new integrationist tactics "had a greater impact than even they perhaps envisioned." It also alienated the St. Augustine business community further; James Brock, for example, says Colburn, who had previously supported compromise, "conceded his attitude had changed as had those of his colleagues in the motel business". Whites were told that this was an example of the future if blacks were given more rights.

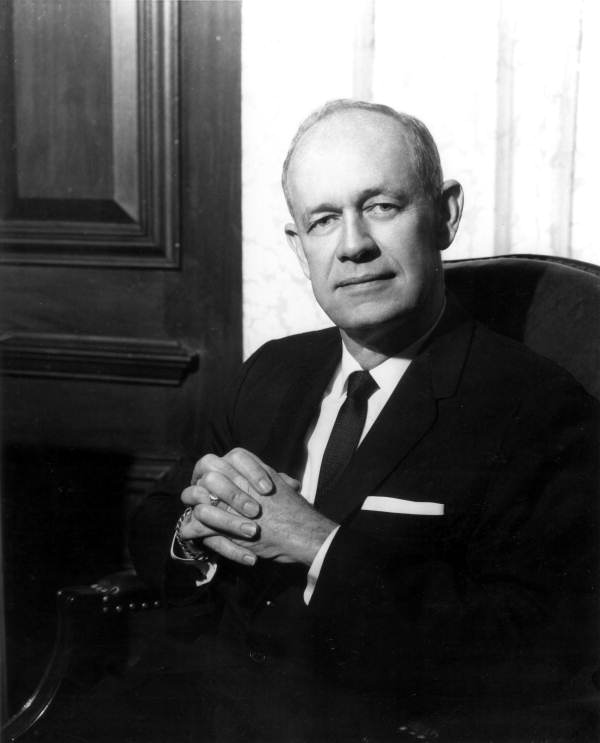
State Governor Farris Bryant, who ordained state rather than city law during the civil rights campaign

Three days before the integration, the state Governor, Farris Bryant had ordained that state officers took custody of those arrested under riot conditions. However, local officers were intermingled with them outside the motel, and notes Branch, one "overwrought local deputy reached over and around a trooper to pummel one arrested swimmer most of the way from the pool to a State Police cruiser". Still wet, they were arrested for trespassing.

The arrest of Dresner and his fellow rabbis remains the record number of rabbis arrested on a single occasion. While in prison overnight, the rabbis composed a document they titled "Common Testament", which Rabbi Eugene Borowitz wrote on the back of a KKK leaflet. Following the rabbis' arrests, comments Bishop, "a wave of antisemitism swept through St. Augustine".

== Aftermath ==
=== Brock's reaction ===
Brock, according to Branch, was "enraged [and] feeling betrayed on both flanks for his moderation, drained and refilled his pool to purify it of integration". He also hired armed guards for the swimming pool and raised the Confederate flag above the motel. It has been described as "one of the most significant events of the St. Augustine Civil Rights Movement". Business leaders, meanwhile, reversed their earlier support for the biracial committee on the grounds that intensifying protests went against the spirit of the proposal. They were particularly concerned, argues Garrow, that King had intended to, in his words, "put the Monson out of business". After all, says Warren, Brock's entire business was focused around the Monson and repeated demonstrations threatened its profitability.

=== Official reactions ===
Two days after the integration, Bryant banned public demonstrations, but the violence continued unabated. The all-white grand jury summoned witnesses to the Monson integration and, instead of authorizing the biracial committee as had been expected, issued a new report. In this, they suggested that St. Augustine demonstrated "a solid background of harmonious race relations" with "a past history of non-discrimination in governmental affairs". Instead of granting the commission, the jury now attacked the motives of King and SCLC, asking whether they really wanted St. Augustine's issues solved; if they did, instructed the grand jury, King "and all others [were] to demonstrate their good faith by removing their influences from this community for a period of 30 days". If, after this period, King and the SCLC had done so, the jury said it would confirm the biracial commission. In the event, all its white members resigned, and the commission never met: Bryant, suggests Webb, had only ever intended the prospect of the commission to "expedite a resolution to the crisis". This was very much down to the Monson motel integration, argues Warren which, while it may have been intended as an almost-comic episode in the protest, "its impact on the jury's decision was anything but comical".

=== Beach protest ===
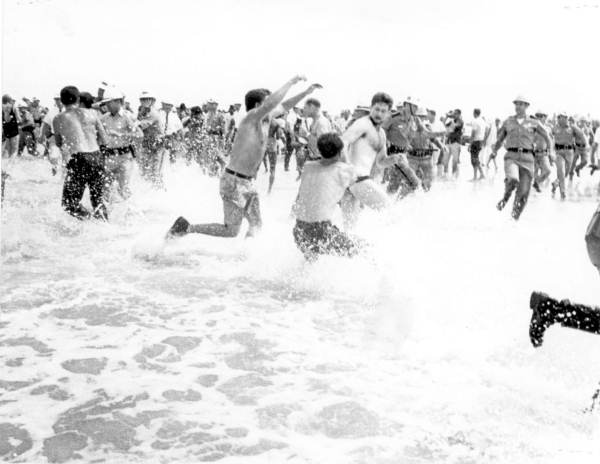
Segregationists trying to prevent blacks from swimming at a "White only" beach in St. Augustine, June 25, 1964

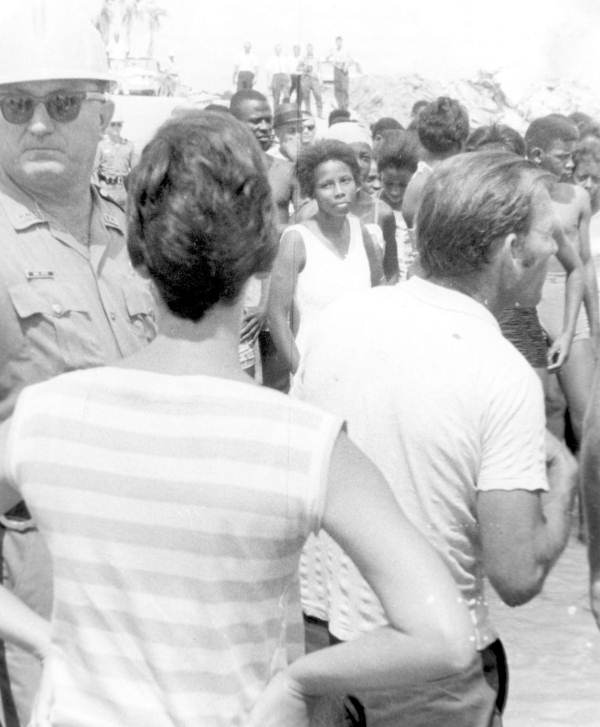
Segregationists, highway patrol and black demonstrators at a "white only" beach, June 25, 1964

The same strategy was repeated less than a week later when SCLC activists performed a "wade-in" at the whites-only St. Augustine beach. On this occasion, violence broke out when the protesters were attacked by segregationists and multiple arrests were made by Florida Highway Patrol officers. Armed gangs of both blacks and whites drove around shooting up cars and windows at night.

=== Civil Rights Act of 1964 ===
However, on July 2 the same year, the Civil Rights Act was signed into United States Federal law, (Note: As Pub. L. 88–352, 78 Stat. 241, enacted July 2, 1964.) This effectively enforced desegregation:

The most immediate effect was to outlaw discrimination in hotels, restaurants, theaters, and other public accommodations. But the law had a far broader reach, barring employment discrimination on the basis of "race, color, religion, sex or national origin" and ending federal funding for discriminatory programs.

The Civil Rights Act was passed by the Senate the day after the Monson Motel swim-in. Jackson argues that, while the St. Augustine protest had probably been directly responsible for enabling the act to be passed, "locals had paid a heavy price". Unemployment went up as, not having security of employment, many were fired from their jobs. An SCLC official later reported that St. Augustine had been "the toughest nut to crack" that he had encountered in his career of direct action; King, too, called it the "most lawless" place he had campaigned in.

=== Desegregation of St. Augustine ===
Brock chaired a meeting of 80 local businessmen to decide how the business community would respond to the new act. Brock told reporters that although his colleagues were, to a man, opposed on principle— and although with "considerable unease", suggests Garrow—by a majority of 75, they agreed to abide by it. The unease stemmed from fears as to how the KKK would react to their adhering to desegregation, and he wrote to Judge Simpson requesting the aid of US Marshals from "the mob action that will undoubtedly occur". (Note: Simpson disagreed, replying that "developments over the last twenty four hours make me extremely hopeful that the trouble you anticipate will not materialize".) With the Johnson administration refusing the aid of federal marshals, says, Oates, "St. Augustine had become a nightmare" for King and the SCLC. On July 4, Brock, as the spokesman for the St. Augustine Hotel, Motel, and Restaurant Owners Association, stated that they "want[ed] to do everything we can to get our community back to normal with harmonious relations between the races".

=== Segregationist protests of the Monson Motor Lodge ===
On Thursday July 9, 1964, James Brock welcomed the first black guests to the Monson Motor Lodge restaurant. Visitors were greeted at the entrance by a picket line; the confederate flag flew and placards announced "Niggers Ate Here". (Note: Events such as these led to President Johnson's political advisor, Lee C. White, informing him within the week that, in St. Augustine, many businesses which had complied with the Act had now resegregated, "claiming that they were afraid".) Brock, suggests Warren, "would pay a high price for advocating harmony among the races", and the Monson was picketed daily from this point. Placards with slogans such as "gated establishments, carrying picket signs proclaiming "Delicious Food—Eat with Niggers Here", "Niggers Sleep Here—Would You?" and "Civil Rights Has To Go" were prominent. Brock asked Stoner, who was on the picket, why the Monson had been targeted; Stoner told him, "we're just trying to help you get some nigger business". Blacks who attempted to eat at Monson were beaten before being driven away.

The Monson Motor Lodge and its restaurant became the epicenter of a violent battle between civil rights supporters and white supremacists after blacks were banned from the facility in June 1964. The business bounced back and forth between segregation, integration, resegregation, and reintegration as the manager, James Brock, attempted to keep his business afloat in the escalating racial violence that followed the passage of the Civil Rights Act that summer. In a matter of weeks, the business experienced the picketing of thousands of civil rights supporters—including seventeen rabbis and Jewish activists who came at the request of Reverend Martin Luther King Jr—a Klan-sponsored fire-bombing of the restaurant, and Brock's dousing of black customers in the motel pool with muriatic acid.

— Marcie Cohen Ferris, The Edible South

=== Re-segregation of the Monson Motor Lodge ===
By July 16, Brock had de-integrated, partly in order, argues Branch, to avoid punishment from local klansmen. If this was the case, however, his attempt failed; Branch notes that, while he remained on good terms with the local KKK, the Monson was still firebombed by an out-of-state gang. A few days later, the KKK held their biggest march yet, boasting that they had recruited significantly on the back of the pending Civil Rights Act. The SCLC had brought a case against around 30 St. Augustine restaurants and eateries in an attempt to force them to integrate. (Note: There were officially two classes of defendants in the case: the eateries, for not segregating, and Manucy for not forcing them to do so.) Warren recounts how Brock—"besieged operator of the now infamous Monson Motor Lodge"—personally testified to the court "his frustration in attempting to comply with the new law and demanded the court get Holstead Manucy and the picketers off his back".

=== Legal hearings ===
As a result, following a two-day hearing, Federal District Judge John Milton Bryan Simpson ordered that blacks be allowed to eat at two restaurants in St. Augustine. Holstead Manucy's testimony was punctuated by his pleading the fifth about 30 times on one day. The SCLC attempted to show that a conspiracy existed to prevented enforcement of the new law. Brock testified that when he had first begun serving blacks and had been picketed, he had asked Manucy to "get the[m]...off his back". When Manucy denied having that kind of influence, Brock had disbelieved him, saying "you are the kingfish with these people". However, he told the court, it had not done any good, and the Monson continued to be picketed. When Simpson pressed Brock to state who was with Manucy on these occasions, Brock requested that the judge not make him answer, telling Simpson, "you put me in an unpleasant position when you ask me this. I am a little bit afraid to be talking like this." Simpson ordered Brock to receive a bodyguard for the remainder of the hearings.

Simpson's judgment was as the first federal ruling under the new Act, a "landmark", argues Warren. All parties were ordered to refrain from further violation; Brock and his colleagues were to desegregate again in accordance with the law and "regardless of threats". (Note: Simpson also rejected a case of contempt that had been brought against Bryant on the grounds that the State Governor could not be held responsible for the police's failure to uphold the law; he also transferred all the pending cases regarding civil rights protesters into Federal jurisdiction.) Brock did so, despite threats from the KKK. On the evening of July 23, business leaders met at the Monson to discuss the legal options available to them. One strategy decided on was to allow themselves to be summonsed, as this might also persuade a judge to condemn the KKK picketing. The following morning, two white men threw a molotov cocktail into the lobby of the Monson, causing damage valued at $3,000 equivalent to $31,143 in 2025 (adjusted for inflation). For the rest of the day, comments Colburn, "those businesses who had not started turning blacks away now did".

=== Dr. King visits St. Augustine ===
On August 5, King returned to St. Augustine for the first time since his release from jail. He was concerned because the struggle there had taken a disproportionate amount of time and manpower, and, notes Bishop, "he was a man with a carefully planned schedule and the calendar of coming events was becoming crowded". (Note: King had, for example, notes Bishop: promised to devote himself to a summertime drive for Southern black voter registration; there was to be a big People-to-People March in the state of Mississippi to honor Medgar Evers; the Democratic National Convention was to be held in Atlantic City in August—and King wanted to be there to make his presence felt; the little town of Selma had been in the planning stage for more than a year, and the people there were waiting for Martin Luther King.)

=== Segregationist backlash ===
The following day the Monson Motel was firebombed. Judge Simpson ordered Brock and his colleagues to obey the law and reintegrate: this, argues Oates, "gave them the excuse of external coercion to take down the "WHITES ONLY" signs—"what else can we do?'", they could ask. Warren also describes Brock and colleagues as "pander[ing] to the Klan" by claiming "we're not capitulating to anybody...we had no other choice". Simpson also passed a restraining order against both Davies and Manucy. This quotes Oates, "ended their reign of terror and moved Abernathy to quip that the movement changed Manucy "from a Hoss to a mule". Not everyone was sympathetic to the St. Augustine business community. The State Attorney, James Kynes, watching from Tallahassee, had "little sympathy". He believed that businesses had encouraged white thugs to confront black picketers and demonstrators—if only through lack of protesting—so they could hardly now complain that the "monster" they had created "now ran amok in their city". Historian David Mark Chalmers agrees, believing that, had business leaders told the sheriff to intervene against the Klan, he probably would have had to. However, "community leaders who had been willing to countenance violence against black people and integrationists found that they were now unable to control it or turn it off", and they were publicly blamed for that failure. Webb, too, argues that silence implicitly equaled approval, particularly among restaurateurs, some of whom not only held KKK fundraisers but provided leading Klansmen and segregationists with free meals.

Brock put out another association statement qualifying their support for the act: "We deplore the action of the Congress and the Courts in enforcing integration...integration of places of accommodation is obnoxious to us". Some of Brock's colleagues put signs above their tills informing patrons that money earned from black customers would be donated to Barry Goldwater's current presidential campaign, as Goldwater was known to be anti-integrationist.

=== Tourism downturn ===
The civil rights protests of June–July 1964 nearly witnessed the destruction of the St. Augustine tourist trade, and a contemporary report declared that "the tourist trade is already off at least 50 per cent...and many a motel owner is threatened by bankruptcy and foreclosure". Jackson estimates that St. Augustine lost approximately 122,000 tourists and $50,000,000 (adjusted for inflation, equivalent to $519,045,064 in 2025) as a result of the protests, which the historian Michael Honey has compared in their ferocity to those of Birmingham, Alabama and Baton Rouge, Louisiana. An investigative committee announced by the state legislature eventually—and, comments Warren, with a "remarkable lack of understanding"—variously blamed King, the KKK, newspapers, and television, for racial problems that could otherwise "have been solved amicably by Negro and White citizens last summer had they been free from outside agitation." The committee also declared that such was the ultimate cost of the events of 1964, that the taxpayers of St. Augustine had effectively paid for King's visit. Likewise, the SCLC campaign, argues Webb, failed to address the fundamental issues "of poverty and deprivation that afflicted the local black community".

=== Racial tensions ===
St. Augustine celebrated its quadricentennial the following year. Tourists flocked, but there was a seething racial tension beneath the surface. Although the business community had changed its policies if not its attitude towards racial integration by 1965, Blacks were still unsure, generally, of where they stood and few dined out in white motels or restaurants. One later said

You can be pretty sure that if you eat at a white restaurant and they know who you are, your boss will be told that you're trying to stir up trouble. If they don't know you, you might be arrested after you leave so they can find out about you.

=== Brock's bankruptcy ===
Tourism helped the desperately in-need city economy; hotels and motels, in particular, were fully booked. Brock, however, did not do as well as he might have hoped. St. Augustine's main bank refused to provide financial cover, and Brock had been consistently refused bank loans to cover costs incurred during the pickets and demonstrations the previous year. On May 2, 1965, he declared bankruptcy, stating

I'd hoped right along that something good would happen that would enable me to continue in St. Augustine, but since June 11, the day I put Martin Luther King in jail, there's been some kind of a stigma I haven't been able to shake...I'd always been a moderate on the racial issue, and we always said we'd integrate if the bill was passed. Months before the bill came up, I had reason to feel that it would pass and the public accommodations action would be included. I tried my best to arrange quiet talks in our community.

=== Official report ===
Nearly two years after the original disturbances, in June 1965, the Florida investigative Committee published its report, titled Racial and Civil Disorders in St. Augustine. The committee was careful to share the blame equally between the Klan and the SCLC, in both cases emphasizing that it was "out of town", rather than resident, elements who had caused the trouble between them. Wade-ins and swim-ins remained a central tactic for Floridian blacks even after the passing of the Civil Rights Act, and laid the path of integrating other areas of society that were proving less than susceptible to change, such as green open spaces and schools.

== Legacy ==
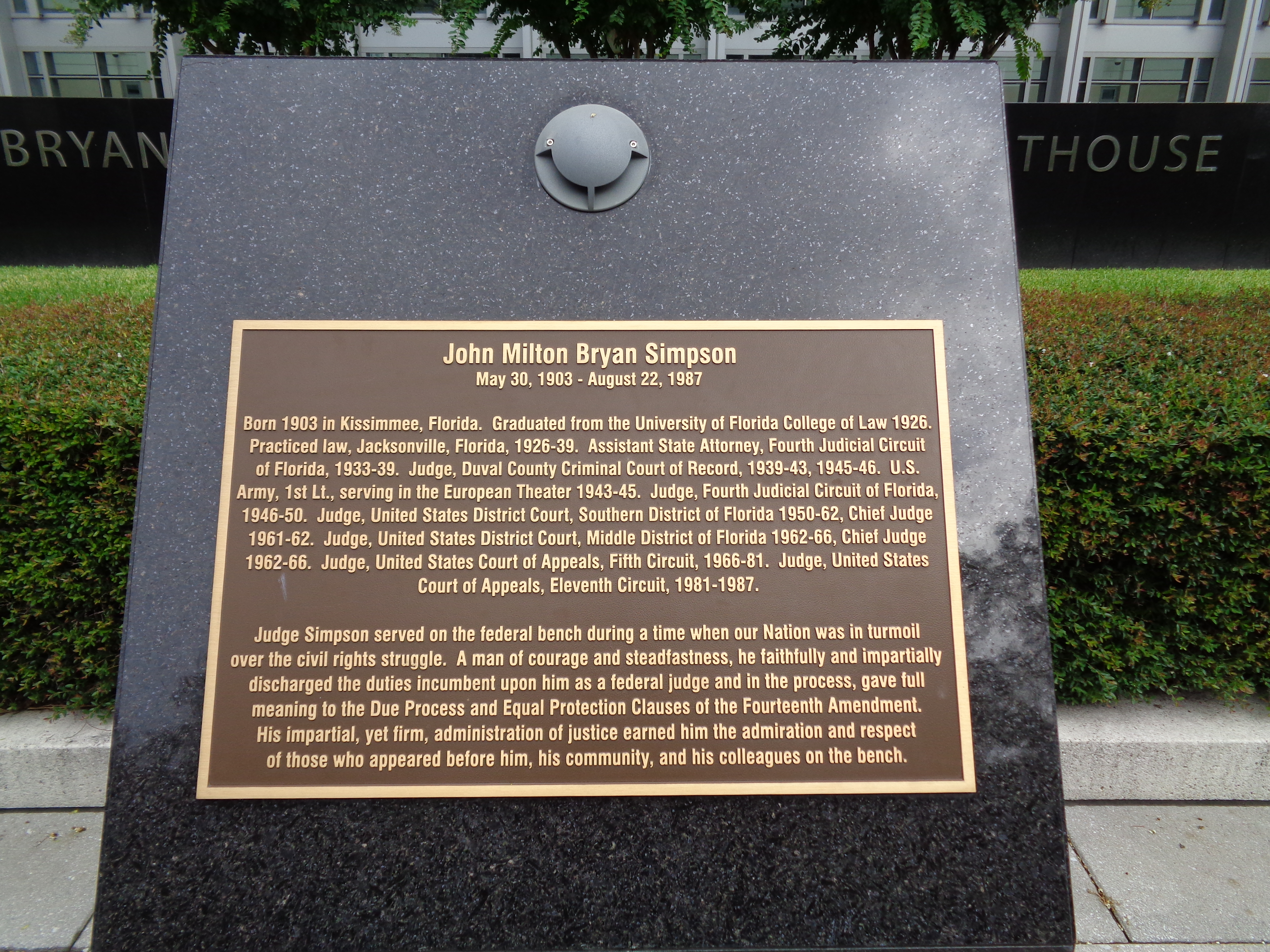
John Milton Bryan Simpson plaque; following his death in 1987, he had a Jacksonville Courthouse named after him.

=== Fate of the Monson Motor Lodge ===
Brock sold the Monson in 1998. The motel and pool were demolished in March 2003 following five years of protests, although not before its early modern foundations had been excavated. (Note: Because there was would be no time to excavate the site between its destruction and commencement of building the new hotel, archaeologists booked into separate rooms while it was still open, dug holes in the floor, gathered their findings and then backfilled and moved onto other rooms.) Those who disagreed with the proposed demolition argued that it would eliminate one of the nation's important landmarks of the civil rights movement. Author David Nolan told WJCT that "people would claim the motel had no historic significance, even though a large civil rights protest occurred there". The owner, a local property developer, wanted to build a new corporate hotel, while opponents believed it would be a useful target for drawing more black tourists to Florida, something the state was attempting to do. (Note: They made comparisons with Harlem, in New York, which highlighted its civil rights heritage tours to both black and white tourists.) A city planner, on the other hand, commented "the Monson is not the only historical site [in St. Augustine]...This one just happens to have Martin Luther King involved". The Hilton Bayfront Hotel was built on the site in 2005, although the steps of the Monson—where Brock and King had their "quiet chat"—have been preserved with a plaque to commemorate King's activism in the city. Brock, interviewed in 1999, stated that "I don't feel sorry for any of that stuff. I have nothing to be ashamed of", as he was obeying the law of the time.

=== Jewish commemoration ===
On June 18, 2015, the St. Augustine Jewish Historical Society commemorated the arrest of the rabbis 51 years earlier. The events, called "Why We Went to St. Augustine" included a public reading of the letter they jointly wrote in jail that night.

== In photographs and film ==
A number of iconic photographs were taken during the integration. One, by an Associated Press photographer, caught Officer Billitz in mid-jump as he leapt into the pool. This appeared the next day on the front pages of the Miami Herald and New York Times. Photographs of Brock pouring acid into the pool made international news headlines, as well as proving ammunition for what has been termed King's "war of images". (Note: According to the author and the former deputy director for the National Archives and Records Administration Roger Bruns, it "was even picked up by Izvestia, the influential Soviet newspaper".) This photograph has since been described as "infamous". Warren notes, too, that due to the distance film had to travel for processing and distribution, for an event to hit the ABC, CBS and NBC six o'clock news bulletins, it had to take place before noon; as the swim-in had taken place just before, it was guaranteed to be headline news that evening.

== See also ==
- List of incidents of civil unrest in the United States
