= Capo's bath house =

Building in Saint Augustine, Florida

Coordinates: 29.8938°N 81.3107°W

Capo's Bath House was a structure that appeared in many images of the Saint Augustine, Florida waterfront during 1870–1914. Capo's occupied an octagonal-shaped building located on a bay pier near 20 Bay Street across from Baya Lane throughout the Flagler Era. It appears in a sketch from 1875 that shows a wood building on a stone foundation across the street from the Old Spanish Prison and the residence of George H Emery.

The facility provided hot and cold sea water, sulfur water baths, and shower baths "in the season." Women and children bathed at separate times than men. Dressing rooms were provided to change from formal clothing to swim attire. In a 1934 interview with the Saint Augustine Record, Ocean View Hotel proprietor Henry E Hernandez described the Bath House:

"When asked about how tourists in the '80s amused themselves, Mr Hernandez told of the many ways in which they could pass their visit pleasantly. In those days the beaches were rather inaccessible but Capo's Bath House, located in front of where the Monson Hotel now stands, provided a place to swim right here in the city. A brick pool filled by the waters of the bay offered a sheltered, safe place for a swim and there were also private pools with hot water for those who didn't care to swim in the larger pools. There were dozens of sailboats for hire along the bay front and beach picnics and moonlight sails were favorite amusements."

The proprietor was Philip V Capo (1844-1901), who was a Saint Augustine native descended from Minorcan colonists. He served in the Confederate Army and returned to city after the war. It was managed for many years by Adolphus N Pacetty (1829-1913), who was also a Minorcan descendant and a Confederate veteran. Pacetty was the nephew of Antonia Paula Bonelly, and the husband of Amelia Monson, whose brother was the proprietor of Monson House.

Capo's Bath House was destroyed in the 1914 fire that also ruined Genovar Opera House, Florida House, Hotel Clairmont, Monson House, and the Saint Johns County Court House.
