= Max Vorspan =

American rabbi and historian (1916–2002)

Max Vorspan (1916 – June 2002) was an American rabbi, professor, historian, and administrator at the American Jewish University, and leader in the Los Angeles Jewish community. He was the founder of the Pacific Southwest Region of the United Synagogue for Conservative Judaism, and the co-author of The History of the Jews of Los Angeles.

Vorspan attended the Jewish Theological Seminary in New York, where he was ordained. After serving as a chaplain in Saipan during World War II, he was the spiritual leader of Pasadena Jewish Temple and Center from 1947 to 1952. Following his departure from PJTC, he began teaching at the University of Judaism, eventually rising to the position of Senior Vice President. For 18 years, he hosted a weekly Sunday-morning public affairs talk show on CBS named Commitment. He also served as the associate director of the Brandeis Bardin Camp Institute.

Co-authored by Lloyd P. Gartner, Vorspan wrote The History of the Jews of Los Angeles in 1970, chronicling the Jewish community's growth from the first establishment of the City of Los Angeles until the present day.

Vorspan died at the age of 86 in June 2002.

== Family ==
Several of Vorspan's family members are also active in the Jewish community. Albert Vorspan, his brother, was an author and Director Emeritus of the Commission on Social Action of Reform Judaism until his death in February 2019. His son, David Vorspan, is founding rabbi of Congregation Shir Ami, and Rabbi-in-Residence of de Toledo High School (formerly New Community Jewish High School.)
