= Saint Augustine Fire of 1914 =

Conflagration in Florida, United States

The Saint Augustine Fire destroyed every structure in Saint Augustine, Florida north of the Plaza from Saint George Street to the Bay on the morning of April 2, 1914. The fire claimed six hotels, the opera house, the courthouse, and countless homes and businesses.

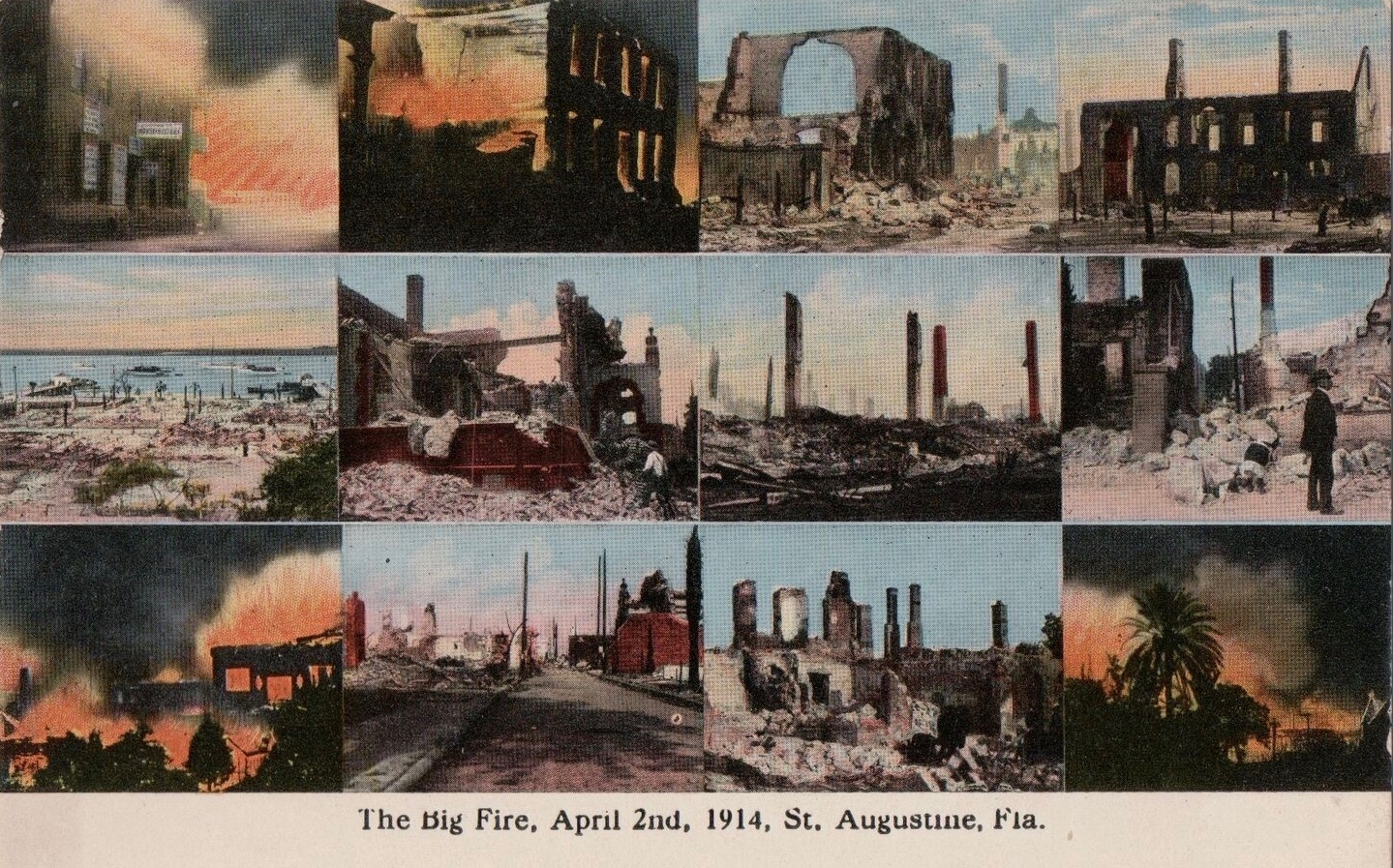
Postcard montage of the destruction

== Origins and firefighting ==
The fire began in the kitchen boiler room of Florida House on Treasury Street before daybreak. It was first reported by patrolman S A McCormick who saw flames from a second floor window while walking his late night beat shortly after 1:00am. The Florida House was engulfed before help arrived. Fire fighters first worked to rescue guests there, many of whom were carried down ladders. The local fire department could do no more than contain the fire and summoned help from Jacksonville's fire department, who arrived via the Florida East Coast Railway.

Hotel guests fled neighboring structures in their night clothes into a blaze of light, visible from the outskirts of the city. Clothing, furniture, and belongings rescued from the fire were heaped on the green in front of Fort Marion and on the Plaza, which the owners tried to sort out for days. Due to crowds of refugees and spectators, Mayor A W Corbett called out the militia to prevent looting. Saint George Street was littered with fallen electric wires and the electric light plant was shut down.

Newspapers reported only one fatality caused by the fire. Alice Smith of Amherst, Nova Scotia, leapt from the third floor of the Florida House and was taken to a hospital with a broken back. She did not recover. A man named Libby, another guest of the hotel, leaped from the second floor, and broke his leg. A number of others were less seriously hurt.

The Bemidji Daily Pioneer estimated property damage at $500,000 to $750,000. The Keowee Courier estimated damage at $400,000.

== Buildings lost ==
Atlantic Hotel was on Bay Street beside The Monson and opened in 1910.

Bennett House was at the corner of Bay and Cuna Streets, and opened in 1910.

Central Hotel was at 84 Charlotte, north of Treasury Street. Henry E Hernandez, who later owned the Ocean View Hotel, operated the Central until 1910.

Capo's Bath House was an octagonal-shaped building located on a bay pier near 20 Bay Street across from Baya Lane throughout the Flagler Era. It was owned by Philip V Capo and operated by Adolphus N Pacetty, providing hot and cold sea water, sulfur water baths, and shower baths. It was popular among tourists before access to the beaches was improved.

Florida House was located on 131 Saint George street near the Plaza. It was advertised in Elias Nason's 1884 Chapins Hand Book of Saint Augustine as featuring 131 large rooms, elegant furnishings, good ventilation, and gas lights. A steam passenger elevator carried guests to the fourth floor. Originally only open in the winter, at the time of the fire the Florida was open all year and the capacity was 250.

Genovar Opera House was on Saint George Street north of Treasury. The theatre hosted traveling companies and had full stage equipment and folding seats. The proprietor was Bartola Genovar, who lost his original Opera House at Charlotte Street and Cuna to a previous fire.

Hotel Clairmont was next to the Opera House on Saint George Street.

Monson House was a wooden boarding house on Bay Street owned and operated by Anthony V Monson and his wife Florence Young. Their original structure burned in an 1895 fire. After 1914, the Monson was replaced by a masonry structure that opened on January 5, 1915, and remained a fixture on Saint Augustine's bay front until 1960.

Saint Johns County Court House was located on the southwest corner of Charlotte and Treasury Streets. It was built in 1907 and burned in 1914. The replacement courthouse was built on its foundations in 1918, and was active until the county government moved into the former Cordova Hotel in 1968.

The Vedder Museum was located on Bay Street at the corner of Treasury and was called "the oldest hotel in America" in a newspaper account of the fire. It was named for Dr John Vedder, who opened a permanent museum for his collection of curiosities and animal specimens in the 1880s. The museum was purchased by the Saint Augustine Historical Society after Vedder's death in 1899. SAHS relocated to the Gonzales-Alvarez House (The Oldest House), which was purchased October 3, 1918. The Vedder was situated next to the bay side entrance to Treasury Street, which was only 6'-1" wide and frequently featured on postcards as "The Narrowest Street in the United States".
