= Llambias House =

Historic house in Florida, United States

- U.S. National Register of Historic Places
- U.S. National Historic Landmark
- U.S. National Historic Landmark District – Contributing property
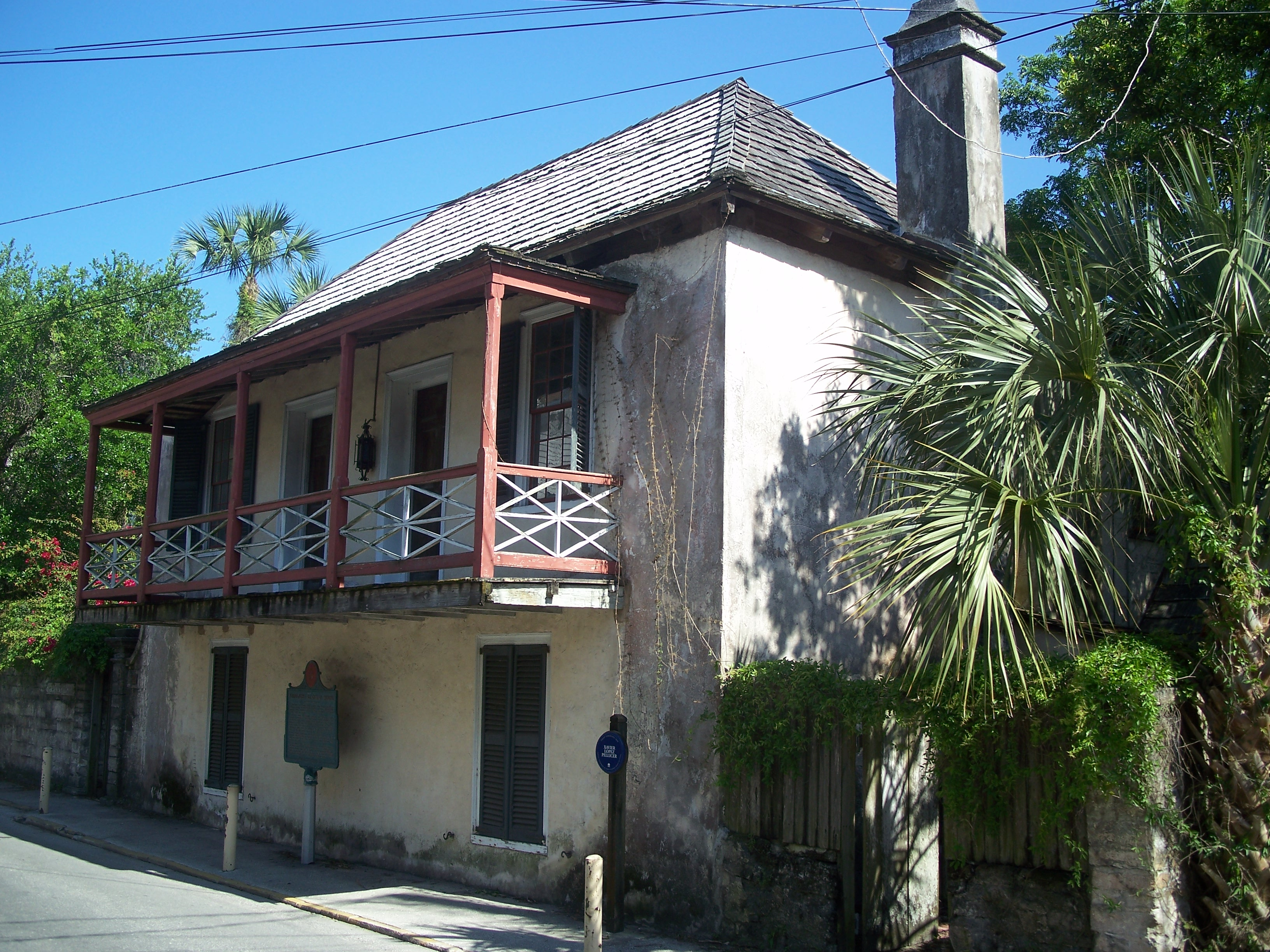
- View from street

- Location within Florida Location within the United States
- Location: 31 St. Francis St., St. Augustine, Florida, USA
- Coordinates: 29°53′15″N 81°18′39″W
- Area: 1 acre (0.40 ha)
- Part of: St. Augustine Town Plan Historic District (ID70000847)
- NRHP reference No.: 70000846

Significant dates
- Added to NRHP: April 15, 1970
- Designated NHL: April 15, 1970
- Designated NHLDCP: April 15, 1970

The Llambias House (also known as the Fernandez-Llambias House) is a historic house located at 31 Saint Francis Street in St. Augustine, Florida. Built sometime before 1763, it is one of the few houses in Florida to survive from the first period of Spanish Florida. It was designated a National Historic Landmark on April 15, 1970. The house is now managed by the St. Augustine Historical Society as an event venue.

== Description and history ==
The Llambias House is located in a residential area south of downtown St. Augustine, on the south side of Saint Francis Street between Charlotte and St. George Streets. It is a two-story structure, built mainly out of plastered coquina limestone and covered by a dormered hip roof. The street-facing facade has two windows on the ground floor, and an overhanging wood-frame balcony on the second floor, with symmetrically placed entrances at the center flanked by windows on the outside. The property includes a kitchen located in an outbuilding, which is also built of coquina.

The house's initial construction date is not known. When Florida was turned over to Great Britain by the Spanish in 1763, this house, then a single-story structure, was already standing. That structure's plan is a common variant of the so-called "St. Augustine plan", a house design that the Spanish developed to deal with Florida's heat and humidity. A typical house of this plan has an open loggia chamber at one end, whereas this house has a wood-frame veranda instead. The building was enlarged in 1777-78 Juan Andreu, who added the second floor, and installed windows into previously unglazed window openings. The house was acquired by Catalinas Llambias in 1854, in whose family it remained until 1919. It was given to the city in 1954, at which time it underwent a major restoration.

== See also ==
- González–Alvarez House
- List of National Historic Landmarks in Florida
- National Register of Historic Places listings in St. Johns County, Florida
- González-Jones House

== Gallery ==
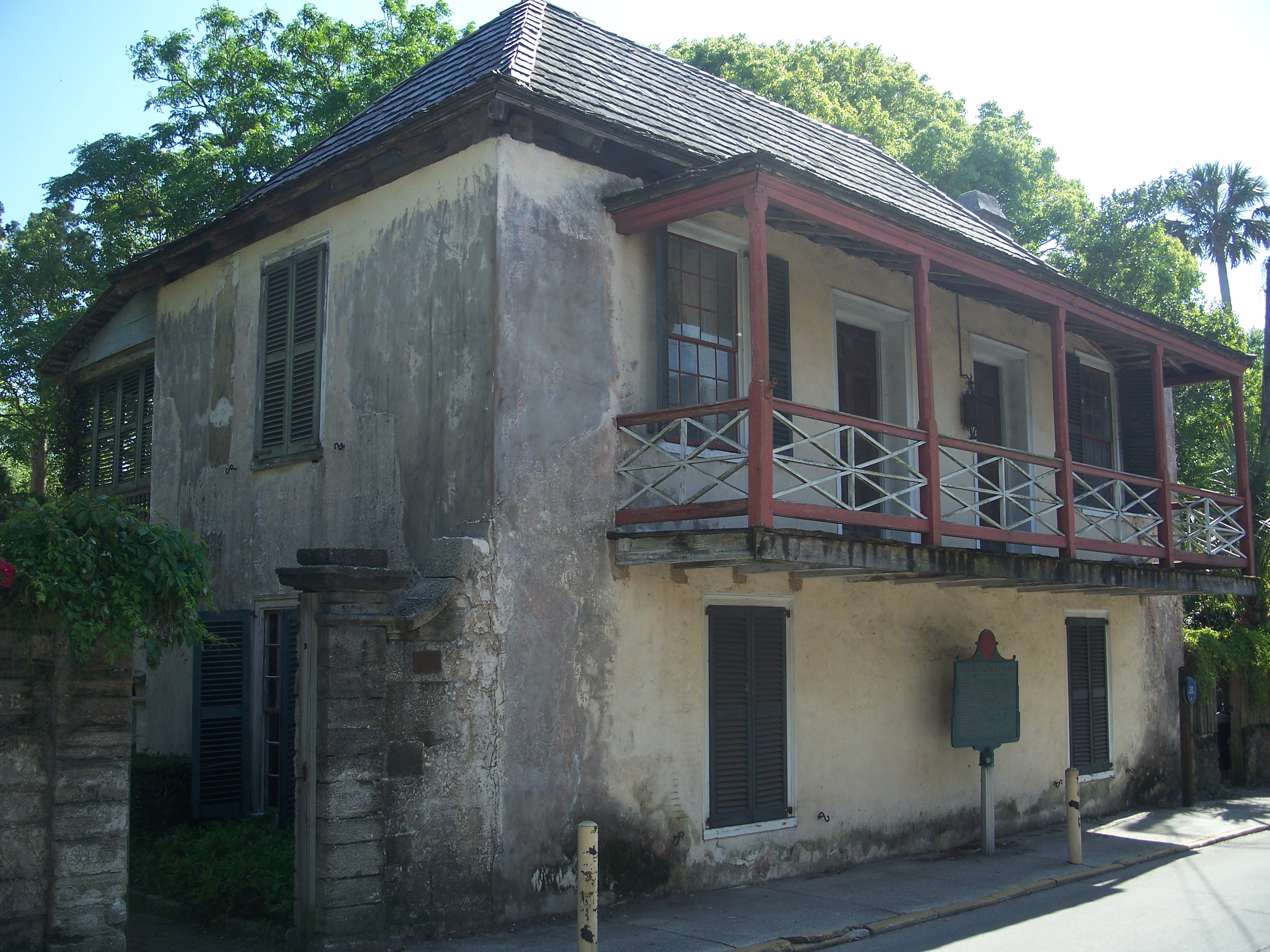
View from street

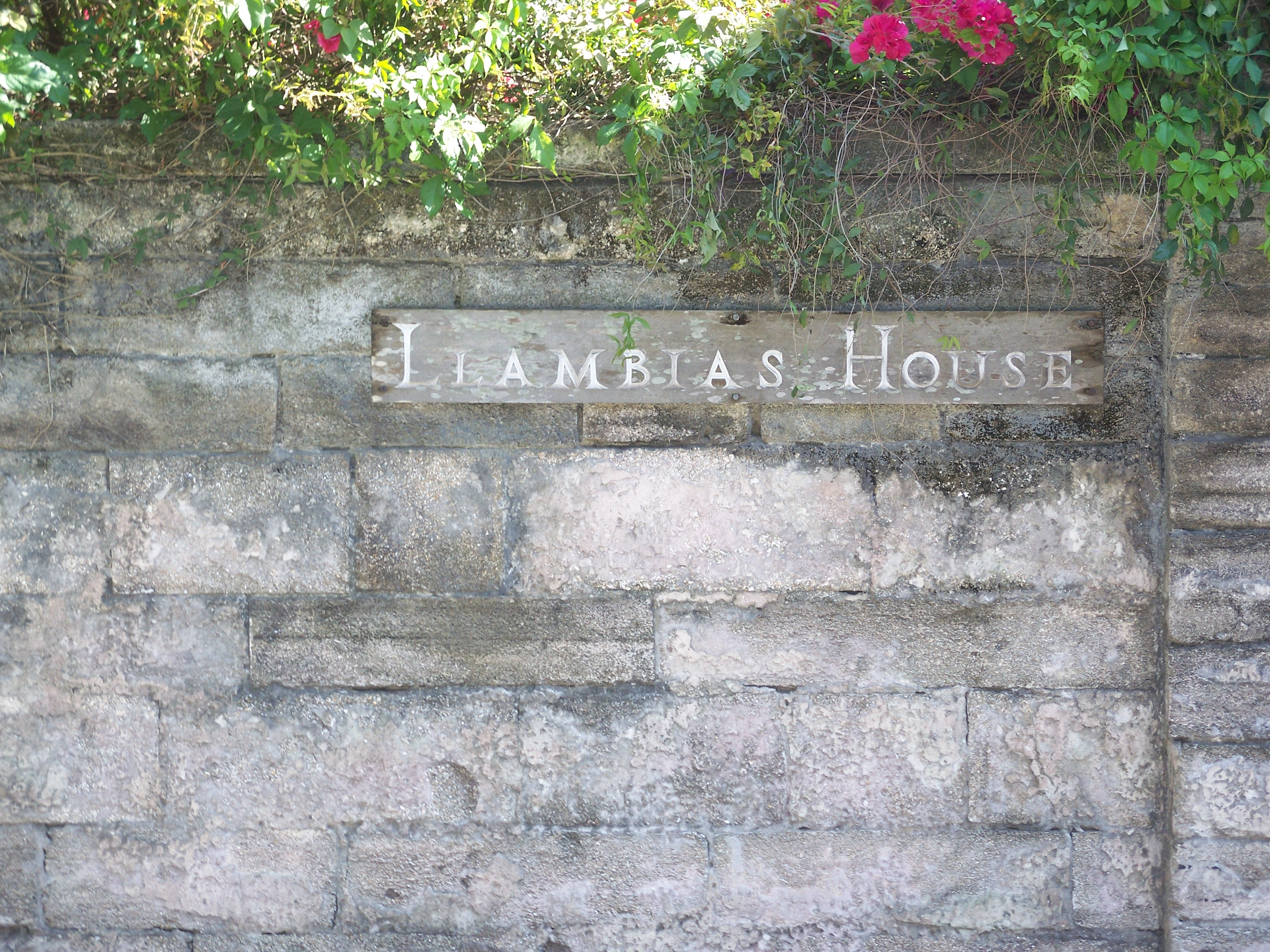
Sign outside

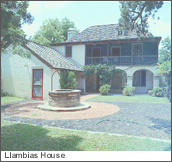
Courtyard view

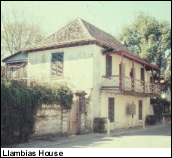
View from street
