= Antonia Paula de la Resurreccion Bonelly =

Antonia Paula de la Resurreccion Bonelly (c. 1786-1870), was a colonial woman of Spanish East Florida who was captured by Miccosukee Indians in 1802 and held captive for twenty-two months. Her rescue and ransom involved many of the major power players that defined relations in this period between the Florida tribes and the nations of Britain, Spain, and the United States.

== Colonial Saint Augustine ==
Bonelly was born in Saint Augustine, Florida, in about 1786 during the Second Spanish Period. She was the daughter of Maria Moll and Josef Bonelly, who were Mediterraneans who immigrated to America with the Andrew Turnbull expedition at New Smyrna, Florida, in 1768. Turnbull's colony was abandoned after nine years of abusive conditions and the surviving colonists walked seventy miles to Saint Augustine seeking release from their indenture. They were welcomed to the city by Governor Patrick Tonyn, who was a rival of Turnbull, and most settled into the Minorcan Quarter where some families thrived for generations.

After the American Revolution, the British ceded the colony to Spain by the Treaty of Paris. British citizens were forced to sell or leave their homes in Saint Augustine, but the Minorcans—who spoke a form of Spanish, practiced Catholicism, and had suffered abuse by British overseers—had little difficulty publicly swearing allegiance to the Spanish crown. Whereas the British sought security through colonization and expansion, the Spanish viewed Saint Augustine as a military outpost. The population of the colony dropped from 17,000 to 3000 after the British evacuation and the Minorcans became the majority civilian population.

== Capture and Ransom ==
In 1796, Josef Bonelly was granted 600 acres by Spanish colonial Governor Enrique White near Matanzas Inlet, where he engaged in farming near the site of the original Turnbull colony. In January 1802, Antonia Paula Bonelly was fifteen years old and living on her father's plantation at Matanzas with her parents and five siblings: her adult brother Tomas (25), and four young children between 1 and 14 years of age. At around three o'clock in the afternoon of January 21, a war party of nine Miccosukee raiders attacked. Josef Bonelly was away from the property, and his son Tomas was murdered—by one account slain in the fields where he was working, by another, tied with cords, scalped, and burned at his father's house at the wharf. Testifying in 1835, an old Saint Augustine citizen recalled seeing the dead body of Tomas Bonelly laid in the marketplace after being brought to town in a boat.

The Miccosukee spared the mother and young children and claimed them as hostages. The party set out immediately with all the plunder that they and the prisoners could carry, and travelled by a circuitous route for the interior of the country. After twenty-four days of travel, they reached their eventual destination: the town of Miccosukee, located along the boundary of Spanish East and West Florida (about twenty miles northeast of present-day Tallahassee). Miccosukee was advantageously isolated. The Spanish considered this area west of the Suwannee River under West Florida jurisdiction, managed at Pensacola, but it was a day's journey from the Spanish outpost at Saint Marks and considerable distance still from Apalachicola.

Bonelly later testified that the Chief was named Ken-ha-jah, but he was almost certainly Kinache, who was known by many names including Kinhega, Kinheja, and Kinhija. Born in 1750, Kinache was prominent among the Seminoles along the mouth of the Apalachicola River. He had allied with Britain during the Revolution and fought against the Spanish. Following Britain's defeat, Kinache moved to the village on the west side of Lake Miccosukee.

It took seven months before a trader trusted by the natives, named Jack Forrester, was sent to rescue the family. Forrester worked for the Scottish firm Panton, Leslie & Company, founded in 1783 for the purpose of trading with the tribes in Florida. Having established themselves in Florida and the Bahamas, Panton was able to continue operating in Florida after its return to Spanish rule because there were no Spanish traders established in trade with the natives. The partners used their influence with the tribes to both advance Spanish territorial claims against the United States, and to encourage the natives to resist new white settlements and US attempts to acquire land.

Acting as emissary in the summer of 1802, Forrester bought the freedom of the mother, Maria Bonelly, and her three youngest children for $300 (~$6,750 in 2025) ransom. But the sum was deemed insufficient for the teenagers, Antonia Paula and Josef, and they remained. Though her condition was undocumented, the ordeal may have shortened the life of eleven year-old Catherine Bonelly, who was released but died within the year. In the weeks that followed Forrester's mission, fourteen year-old Josef escaped the Miccosukee and hid in the surrounding woods and swamps. He made it to Saint Marks on the Gulf of Mexico where military commanders had him sent to Havana. There, he spotted a family friend and sea captain named Esteban Benét who was able to transport him home to Saint Augustine.

In 1803, the elder Josef Bonelly sold his Matanzas holdings and gathered the remaining ransom. Twenty-two months after the original attack, he sent his son-in-law Tomas Pacetty with $200 to gain freedom for Antonia Paula. Pacetty traveled with King Payne, a native interpreter, and an African slave. The venture was successful, and Pacetty returned the now seventeen year-old to her family, several months pregnant. Bonelly had been held by the Miccosukee medicine man as a mate, and weeks after returning to Saint Augustine, she gave birth to a girl that was baptized Maria Antonia Demecia Bonelly. The girl lived nine or ten years. She died around the same year as Antonia Paula's father, who passed in 1811 at the age of 54. Josef Bonelly was financially ruined by the raid on his property, and there is no evidence of how he supported himself after selling his farm.

Antonia Paula Bonelly married Bartolome Leonardy in 1808—while her Miccosukee daughter was still living—and had a large family, about half of whom would become early settlers of Tampa. Leonardy was the son of one of the most prominent Minorcan businessmen in colonial Saint Augustine, Don Roque Leonardy. Bonelly lived through the Civil War and had grandchildren and great grandchildren who fought for the Confederacy. She died in 1870 when she was 84 years old, and last lived at the house of her daughter Laurenna Leonardy at 56 Marine Street (the González-Jones House).

== Political Context ==
The attack on the Bonelly plantation was not random, and it had political roots in the decades-long struggle between native, Spanish, British, and American interests in Florida. King Payne told Jack Forrester that a small party of natives had set out with the intention of plundering the inhabitants of the coast. Forrester was concerned that the Spanish defenses along the Saint Johns were relaxed and that even small groups of raiders—like the nine-man Miccosukee war party—could not be repelled. Planters, like Bonelly, were increasingly anxious about their exposed position.

Forrester and Payne's direct involvement in the Bonelly negotiations show that larger forces were at play in this event than simply the safety of a fifteen-year-old girl. Panton had a robust commercial enterprise in Florida that had withstood the political change of authority from Britain to Spain, but was now at risk because of a lack of security. The balance of allegiances was complicated for the tribes. While William Augustus Bowles appealed to natives with a call for nationalism, Forrester was the key access point to essential European commodities: in particular, weapons and rum. Panton supported Indian resistance against Spanish incursions and the imminent invasion of the United States, but not if that resistance included the disruption of Panton's monopoly by insurgents like Bowles.
