= Albert Vorspan =

American author (1924–2019)

Albert Vorspan (February 12, 1924 – February 16, 2019) was an American author and long-time leader of Reform Judaism. He was director emeritus of the Commission on Social Action of Reform Judaism. and served as senior vice president of the Union of American Hebrew Congregations, the predecessor organization of the Union of Reform Judaism, at the time of his retirement in 1993.

Vorspan was born in St. Paul, Minnesota. He fought in the US Navy during World War II.

In 1964, Vorspan was arrested and jailed with a group of Reform rabbis who at the request of the Rev. Martin Luther King, Jr. joined in the civil rights protests in St. Augustine, Florida.

In 1966, his criticism of the war in Vietnam was condemned by Sen. Thomas J. Dodd, a member of the Senate Subcommittee on Internal Security, as reflecting "a vociferous minority" rather than mainstream Jewish opinion.

In 1988, at the outbreak of the first Palestinian intifada, he criticized Israeli government policy. In a series of diary entries published in the New York Times Magazine, he wrote, "Whether we accept it or not, every night's television news confirms it: Israelis now seem the oppressors, Palestinians the victims." In response, Malcolm Hoenlein, executive vice chairman of the Conference of Presidents of Major American Organizations, accused him of "too much public posturing and too little private discourse."

== Legacy ==
Union for Reform Judaism senior adviser Rabbi David Saperstein called Vorspan "one of the g’dolei hador, or 'great ones', of Jewish social justice work." URJ President Rabbi Rick Jacobs described Vorspan as "one of the towering giants of Jewish social justice."

== Family ==
Several of Vorspan's family members are also active with social issues, many involving the Jewish community. His brother, Max Vorspan, who died in June 2002, was an American rabbi, professor, historian, and administrator at the American Jewish University, and leader in the Los Angeles Jewish community. His nephew, Rabbi David Vorspan, is Founding Rabbi of Congregation Shir Ami in Woodland Hills, California, and Founding Rabbi of de Toledo High School in West Hills, California. His grandson, Emmett Vorspan-Stein, works with the municipal government of Cambridge, MA.

Vorspan was married to Shirley Vorspan for 72 years until her death on August 27, 2018.

== Books ==
- Albert Vorspan and David Saperstein. Jewish dimensions of social justice : tough moral choices of our time New York, NY.: UAHC Press, 1998. ISBN 0-8074-0650-3.
