= Monson Motor Lodge =

Site of protest event in Florida, US

Monson House

General information
- Location: 24 Bay Street, St. Augustine, Florida, United States
- Opened: 1884
- Demolished: 1960

Monson Motor Lodge

General information
- Location: 32 Avenida Menendez, St. Augustine, Florida, United States
- Opened: 1961
- Demolished: 2003

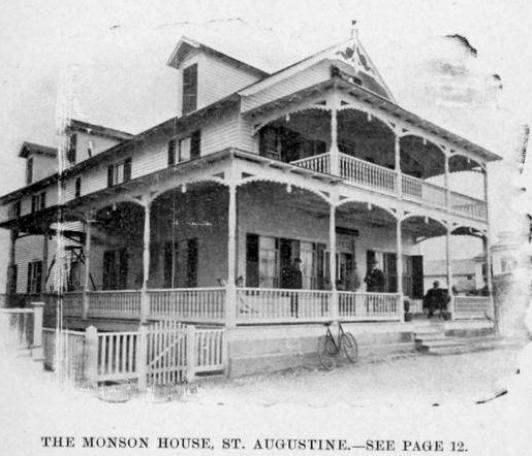
1880s image

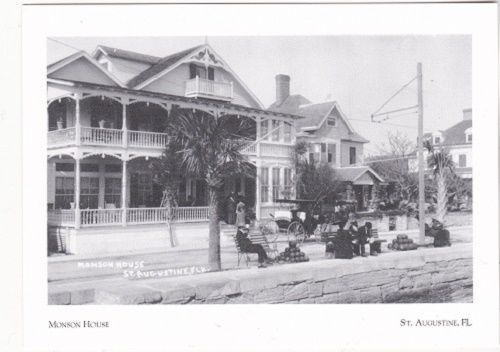
1880s image

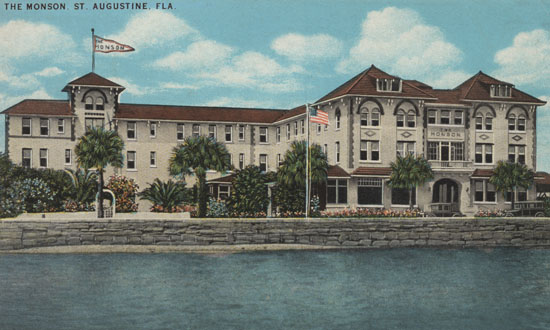
rebuilt after 1914 fire

The Monson Motor Lodge was a hotel located at 32 Avenida Menendez, Saint Augustine, Florida. The site was originally the site of a boarding house as early as the 1880s, and was later the site of the Monson Hotel before the final Monson Motor Lodge was constructed in 1961. It was the site of the 1964 Monson Motor Lodge Protests, a series of landmark Civil Rights actions. The Monson Motor Lodge was demolished in 2003 and a Hilton Hotel was built on the site. Today, historical markers at the hotel commemorate the protests and the motel's front steps and original sign have been preserved.

== The Monson House ==
The original hotel was established by Captain Anthony Vincent "Bossy" Monson and his wife Florence Young in the 1880s, not long before the opening of the Flagler hotels made the city a luxury tourist destination.

The first Monson House was on the water's edge at 24 Bay Street (now Avenida Menendez), between the Plaza de la Constitución and Fort Marion. According to historical descriptions, there were rooms for ten boarders at $9-$10/week. In addition to rented rooms, the Monson offered tourists a chance to sail on one of four yachts anchored near the club house. In 1895, the structure was destroyed by a fire.

Later, Monson House was reopened in a new location at 26 Bay Street next to Baya Lane. Open all year, the rates were $1.50 to $2.00 per day with $7.00 to $12.00 per week. Residents could enjoy hot and cold baths. The hotel was again enlarged in 1901 and in 1912, when the capacity was advertised at 75. The second Monson House burned down in the Saint Augustine Fire of 1914 that started at the Florida House and destroyed everything from Saint George Street to the Bay. The fire claimed four hotels, the opera house, the courthouse, and countless homes and businesses.

== Monson Hotel ==
The Monson was rebuilt as masonry structure and reopened on January 5, 1915, as the Monson Hotel. Anthony Monson died later that year, and his brother-in-law, Charles E Young Sr., became manager of the new hotel. After reopening, the Hotel embraced its fiery history, adopting phoenix imagery on its letterhead and facade. The hotel was enlarged in 1917 with an addition to the south side.

For a brief period from 1942 to 1945, the hotel was taken over by the U.S. Coast Guard before being reopened to the public. In 1947, the Monson came under new ownership when it was purchased by William W. Faw. Faw was the first owner of the Hotel not related to the Monson family. The Monson Hotel remained a fixture on Saint Augustine's bay front until 1961, when it was demolished and the Monson Motor Lodge was built in its place.

== The Monson Motor Lodge and the Civil Rights Movement ==
The new Monson Motor Lodge was a segregated motel with an attached restaurant and a waterfront pool. The Motel remained under Faw's ownership, but was managed by James Brock, then President of the Florida Hotel-Motel Association. Brock's association with the Florida Hotel-Motel Association and the fact that the motel's restaurant was popular with local reporters, are likely reasons that the Monson was targeted during the 1964 Civil Rights protests in Saint Augustine.

In the spring of 1964, Dr. Robert Hayling, a prominent Civil Rights activist working with the Southern Christian Leadership Conference, invited Martin Luther King Jr. to visit Saint Augustine. On June 11, 1964, King and other SCLC leaders attempted to dine at the Monson restaurant. They were refused service and later arrested on the Monson's front steps when he refused to leave. King was taken to Saint Augustine Jail, where he wrote a "Letter from the Saint Augustine Jail" to his friend, Rabbi Israel S. Dresner, encouraging rabbis to come to Saint Augustine and take part in the movement.

A week after King's arrest, on June 18, 1964, another major protest occurred at the Monson. A group of rabbis, led by Dresner, led an open-air prayer in the Monson's parking lot. At about the same time, a group of black and white activists jumped into the Monson swimming pool in defiance of segregation ordinances. Brock responded by pouring muriatic acid (a cleaning agent) into the water to drive the swim-in protestors out. Photographs of this action, and of a police officer jumping into the pool to arrest the young activists, were broadcast around the world and became some of the most famous images of the Civil Rights Movement. Hundreds of bystanders at the protest were taken into custody alongside the swim-in participants and the rabbis This marked the largest mass arrest of rabbis in American history. After the Civil Rights Act was passed on July 2, 1964, the Monson was integrated, though it continued to be the site of protests organized by white segregationists and members of the Ku Klux Klan.

The Monson Motor Lodge remained open under the management of James Brock through the remainder of the 20th century. Brock became the owner after Faw's death in 1980.

== Hilton Garden Inn and the Monson's legacy ==
In 1999, Brock sold the property to Kanti Patel. The restaurant and motel remained open until 2003, when the building was razed to make way for the construction of a new Hilton hotel. Prior to the demolition, the City of Saint Augustine conducted a multi-year archaeological investigation of the property between 2000 and 2003. This investigation revealed that the site had first been developed as early as the Spanish Colonial Period in the early 1700s. During excavations prior to construction of the Hilton's underground parking garage, archeologists also found evidence of colonial foundations from Saint Augustine's British Period (1763–1784).

There was controversy over the demolition of the Monson Motor Lodge, as some saw it as an important historical site relevant to the Civil Rights Movement worthy of preservation. While the building was ultimately demolished, multiple historical markers at the Hilton Saint Augustine Historic Bayfront Hotel commemorate the history of the protests. The Monson's front steps were salvaged and preserved at the hotel with a historical marker. In 2014, the Hilton hosted an event on the 50th anniversary of the protests to commemorate the events that took place there.

The last sign from the Monson is preserved in the ACCORD Civil Rights Museum at 79 Bridge Street, the former dental office of Dr. Hayling.
