= O'Reilly House =

Historic house in Florida, United States

- U.S. National Register of Historic Places
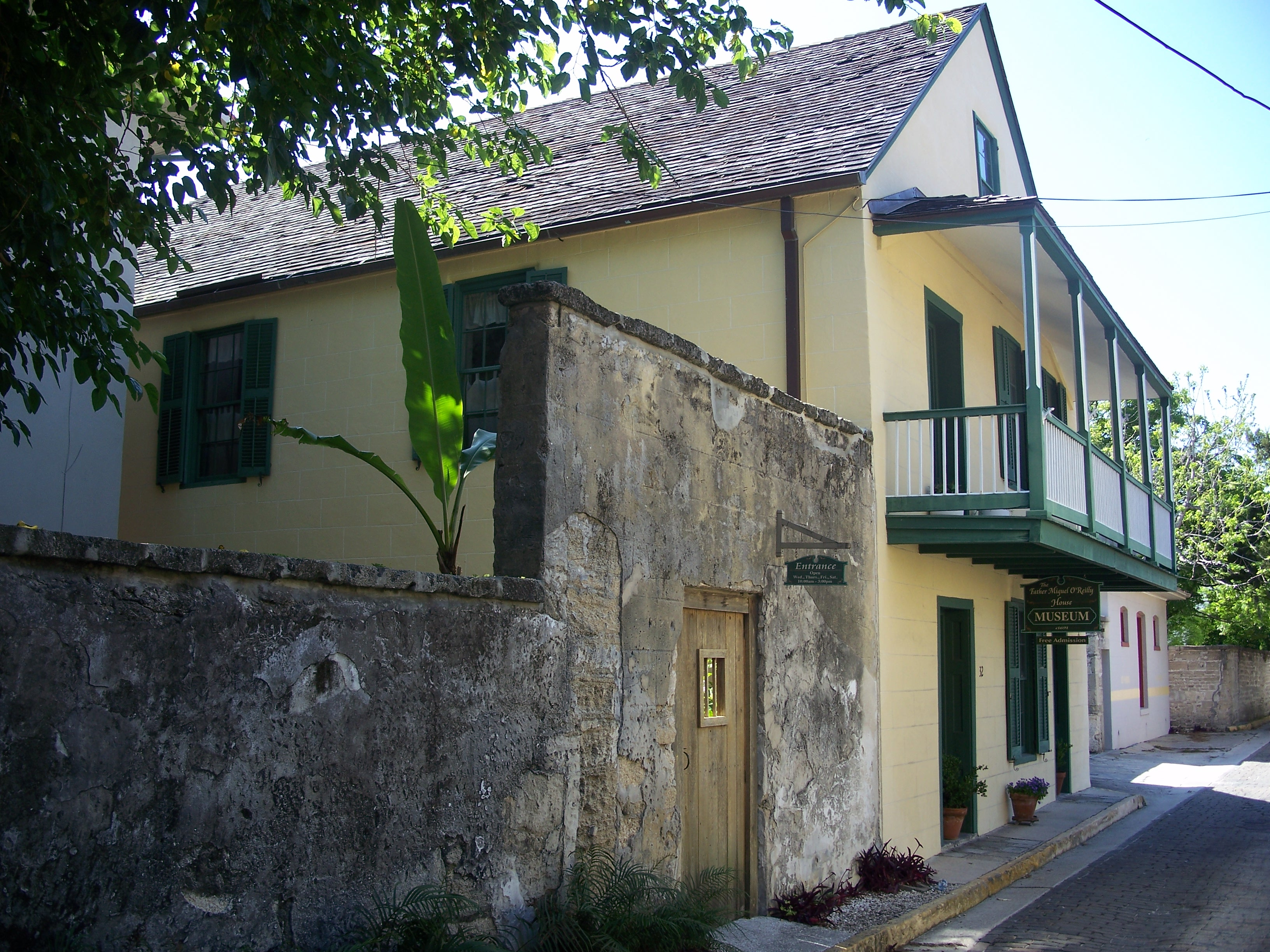

- Location within Florida Location within the United States
- Interactive map showing the location of O'Reilly House
- Location: St. Augustine, Florida
- Coordinates: 29°53′24″N 81°18′41″W
- NRHP reference No.: 74002192
- Added to NRHP: October 15, 1974

The O'Reilly House, known officially as the Father Miguel O'Reilly House Museum, and also known as the House of Don Lorenzo de Leon, is a historic home in St. Augustine, Florida. It is located at 131 Aviles Street. On October 15, 1974, it was added to the U.S. National Register of Historic Places.

The museum's exhibits focus on the Catholic heritage of St. Augustine.

== Gallery ==
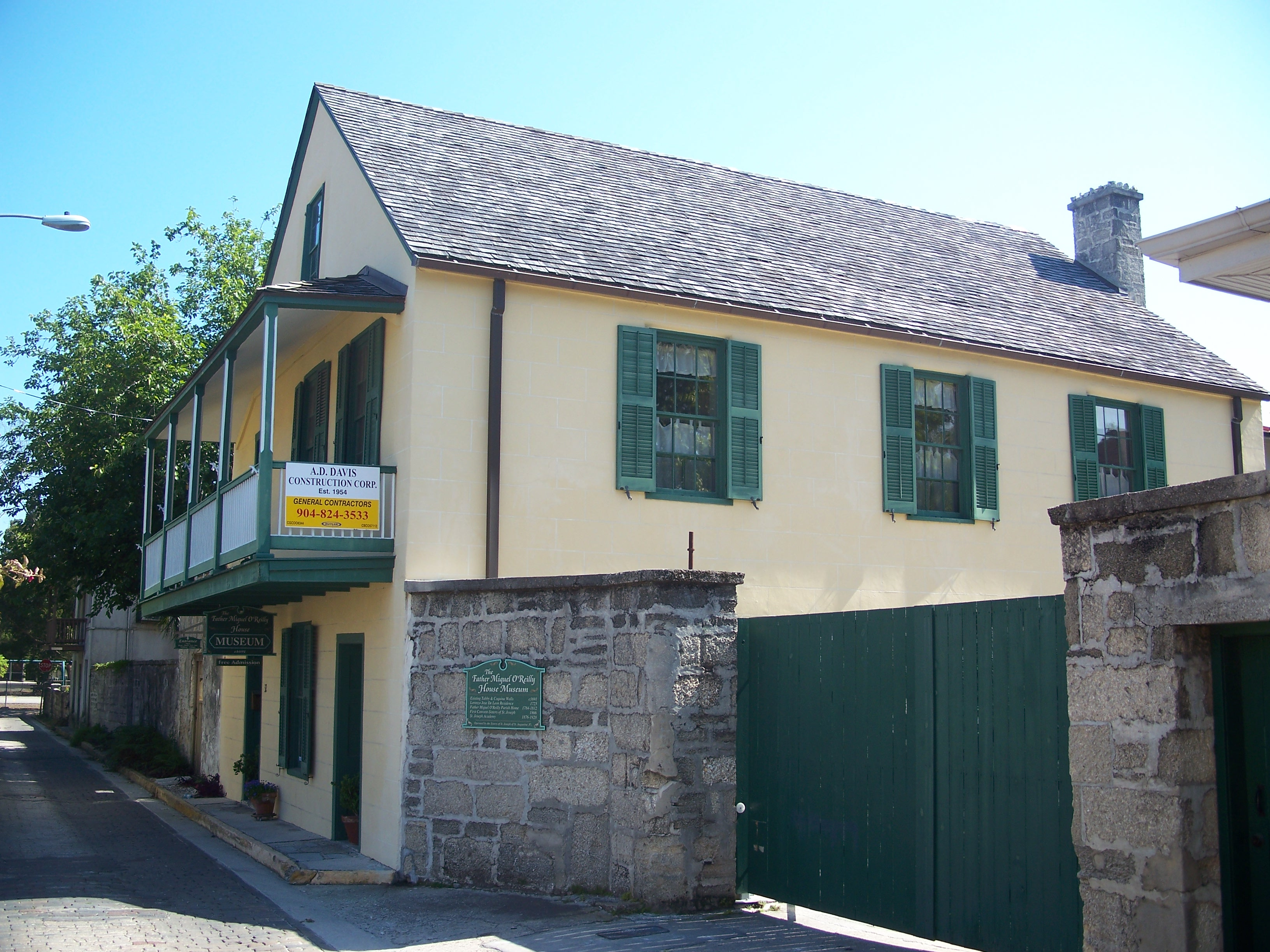

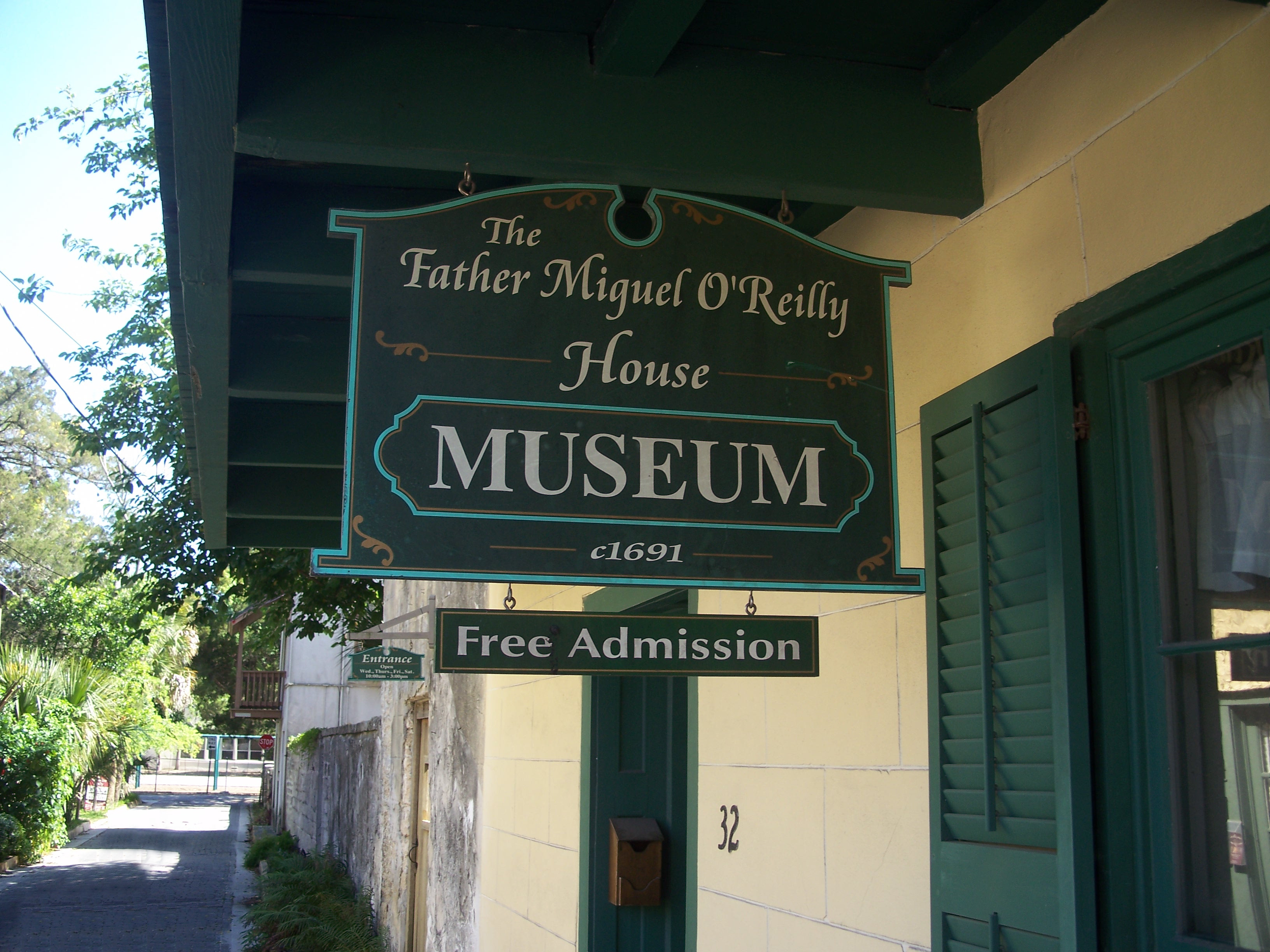

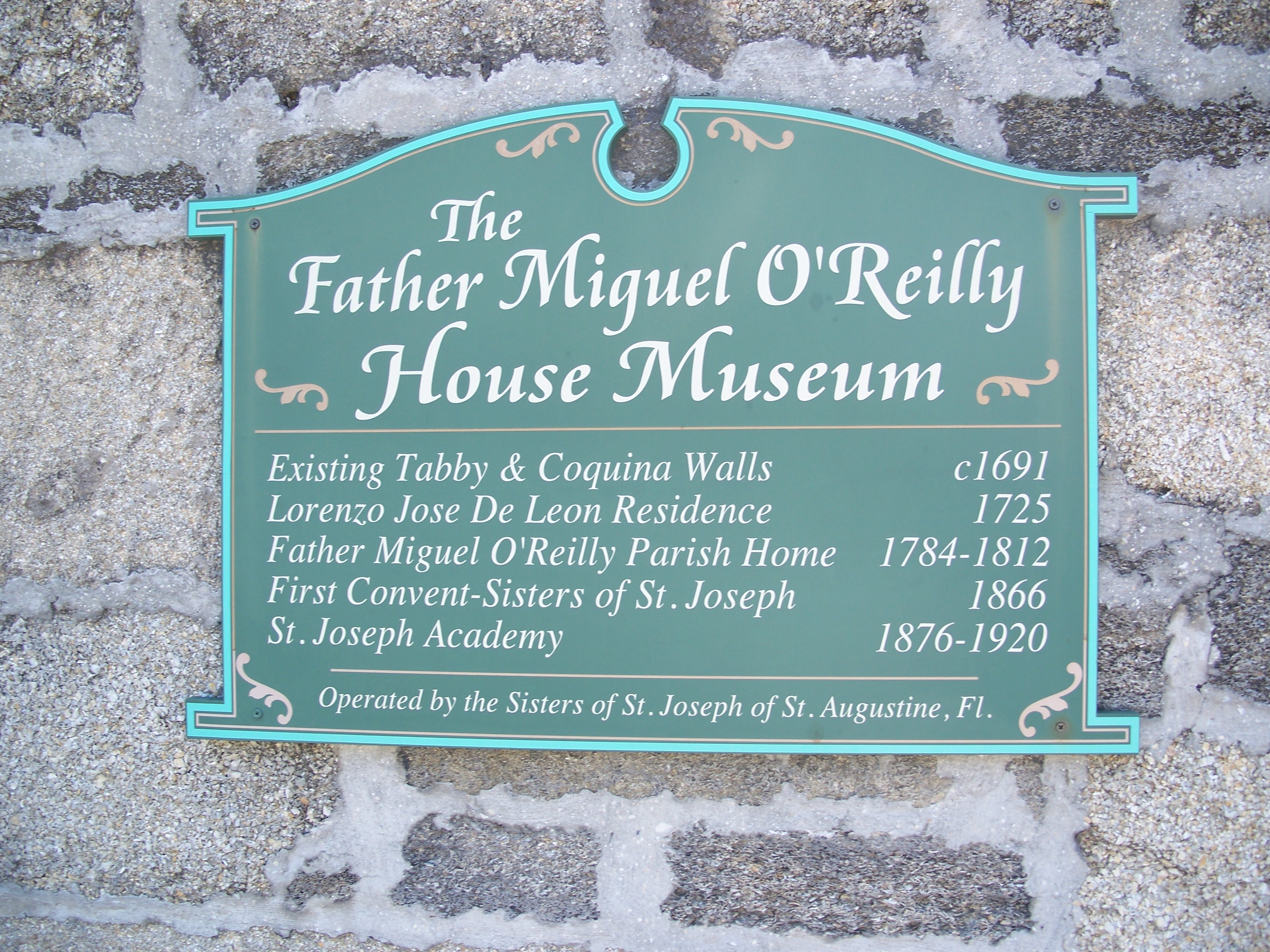
