= Israel S. Dresner =

American rabbi and activist (1929–2022)

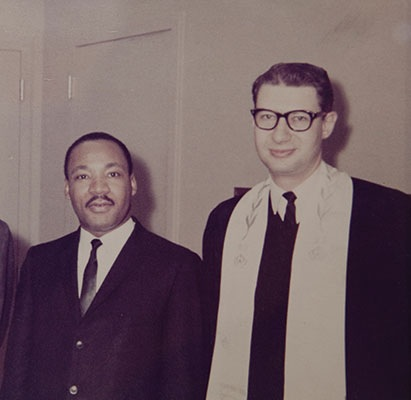
- Dresner with Martin Luther King Jr.
- Born: April 22, 1929; Lower East Side, New York, U.S.
- Died: January 13, 2022 (aged 92); Wayne, New Jersey, U.S.
- Occupation: Rabbi

Israel Seymour Dresner (April 22, 1929 – January 13, 2022) was an American Reform rabbi who was president of the Education Fund for Israeli Civil Rights and Peace. He was repeatedly arrested for his activism in the Civil Rights Movement, and was a friend of Martin Luther King Jr. Over the years, Dresner and King shared pulpits, and preached to each other's congregations.

== Early life ==
Dresner was born April 22, 1929, on the Lower East Side of New York City. He was raised in Brooklyn, attending an Orthodox yeshiva (day school). At the age of 13, he joined Habonim Dror, a Labor Zionist youth movement, and in his teens, he became one of its leaders. He studied at Brooklyn College and the University of Chicago and got a B.A. and an M.A. in international relations.

== Career ==
Dresner spent 1951 and 1952 working at a new kibbutz, Urim, in the Negev. He then spent two years as an enlisted man in the US Army, the first year of which was the last year of the Korean War.

The next five years were spent studying at the New York School of the Hebrew Union College - Jewish Institute of Religion, where he was duly ordained as a rabbi. His first year in the active rabbinate was in Danbury, Connecticut, as assistant to Rabbi Jerome Malino. He then spent 12 years as rabbi of Temple Sha'arey Shalom in Springfield, New Jersey and 25 years as rabbi of Temple Beth Tikvah in Wayne, New Jersey. He was elected rabbi emeritus of the latter upon his retirement.

== Civil rights movement ==
Dresner was once dubbed "the most arrested rabbi in America."

He was the foremost rabbinic participant in the Civil Rights Movement's struggle of the 1960s, and he was one of the three rabbis who was closest to Martin Luther King Jr. King spoke on two occasions (1963 and 1966) at Dresner's congregation in Springfield.

Dresner was the first rabbi arrested in the Freedom Rides protests of 1961, when he participated in an interfaith clergy freedom ride. He served for short periods as a prisoner on four occasions in prisons in Florida and Georgia from 1961 to 1964. One of his cases, Dresner et al. v. Tallahassee, reached the US Supreme Court.

US President Barack Obama honored him at the White House on the evening before the 50-year anniversary celebration of the March on Washington.

He was one of the outstanding rabbinic leaders in the struggle against the war in Vietnam and for the rights of the poor; women; immigrants, gays and lesbians: disabled people; and racial, religious and ethnic minorities.

He served on the Social Action Commission of Reform Judaism for almost 44 years and was one of its few lifetime members. He was an early (1966) leader in the struggle for Soviet Jews.

== Criticism of Israel ==
Dresner was a critic of the Netanyahu government and was active in the peace movement in Israel.

He was the president of the Education Fund for Israeli Civil Rights and Peace (now Partners for Progressive Israel).

He was one of the first rabbis to oppose the policies of the Jews in Israel and the US who advocated annexing the Palestinian territories occupied by Israel during the Six-Day War, in 1967. He opposed the settlers' movement from its inception in 1968, as have the nine US presidents who have served since then. He was a dovish leader of Zionism by advocating a peace agreement with the Palestinians for a two-state solution, with the Israeli-Palestinian conflict and to the Arab-Israeli conflict. He was elected twice a delegate and twice an alternate to the World Zionist Congress.

He visited Israel since 1951 on 36 occasions, lastly in October and November 2013. He supported the policies of Israeli Prime Ministers Rabin, Peres, Barak and Olmert, and Israeli ministers such as Sarid (education), Beilin (justice), and Livni (foreign affairs).

He was a leader of an American Zionist organization for peace, justice, pluralism, and democracy, Partners for Progressive Israel, for a quarter-century, serving as its president for three years in the 1990s. He was a member of J Street since its founding.

== Personal life and death ==
Dresner had a son and a daughter.

In December 2021, Dresner announced he was in the final days of stage four colon cancer. He died at a senior living center in Wayne from the disease on January 13, 2022, at the age of 92.
