= Slave market =

Place where slaves were bought and sold

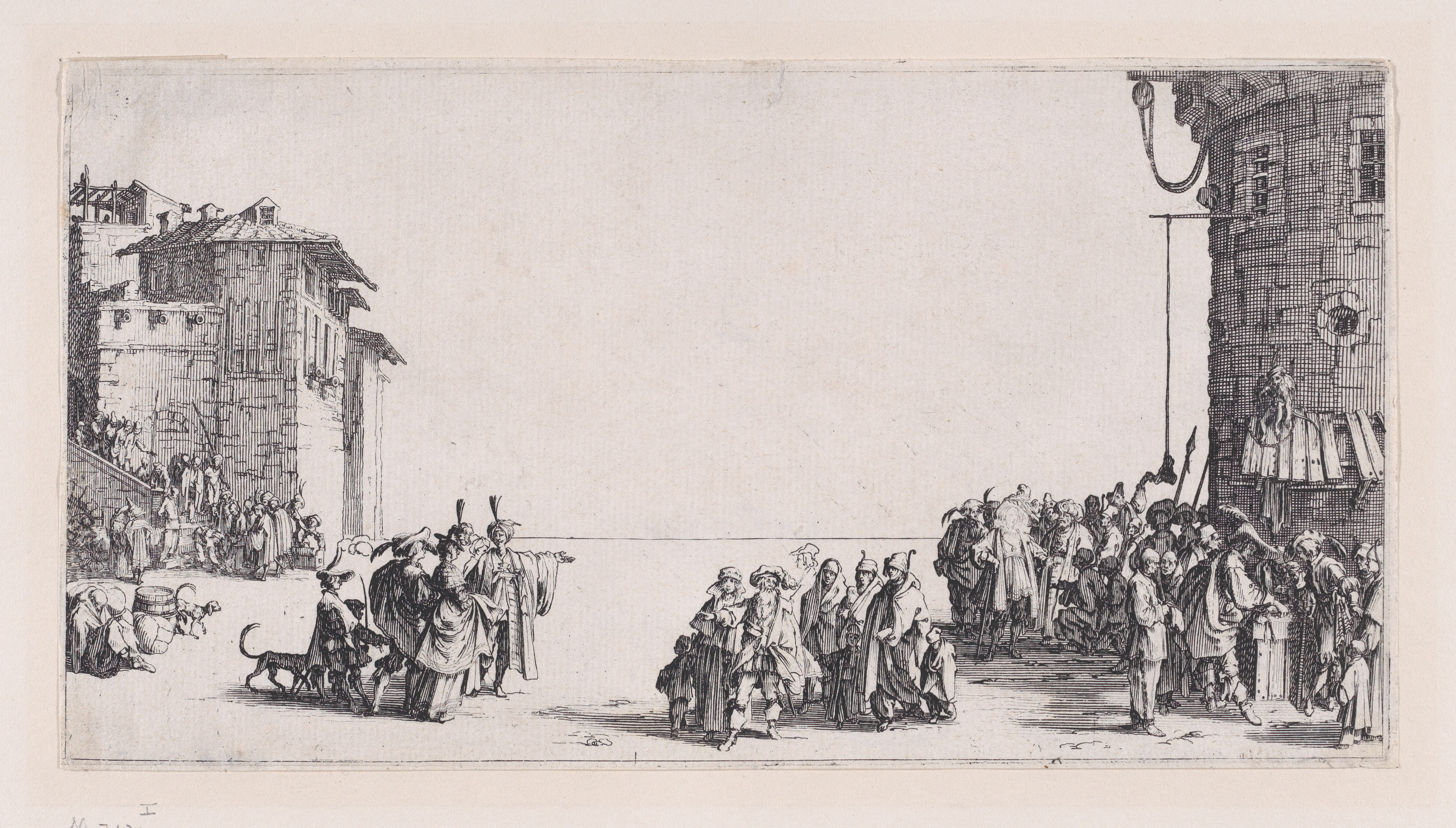
Slave market, early 17th century by Jacques Callot

A slave market was a place where slaves were bought and sold. These markets were a key phenomenon in the history of slavery.

== Asia ==
=== Central Asia ===
Since antiquity, cities along the Silk road of Central Asia, had been centers of slave trade. In the early middle ages, Central Asia was a transit area for European slaves sold by the Vikings in Russia to slavery in the Abbasid Caliphate via the slave markets of the Central Asia. The slave trade in the Mongol Empire created a network of connected slave markets between Asia and Europe. The Mongol Empire established a massive international slave trade founded upon war captives enslaved during the Mongol conquests, which were distributed by market demand around the empire via a network of slave markets connected through the cities of the empire.

In the 19th century, the slave markets of Khiva and Bukhara were still among the biggest slave markets in the world. In Bukhara, Samarkand, Karakul, Karshi, and Charju, mainly Indians, Persians, Russians, and some Kalmyk slaves, were traded by Turkmens, Kazakhs, and Kyrgyz. From the 17th to 19th centuries, Khiva was a notorious slave market for captured Persian and Russian slaves. The slave markets of central Asia were eradicated with the Russian conquest of the Islamic states of Central Asia in the 1870s.

== Africa ==
=== East Africa ===
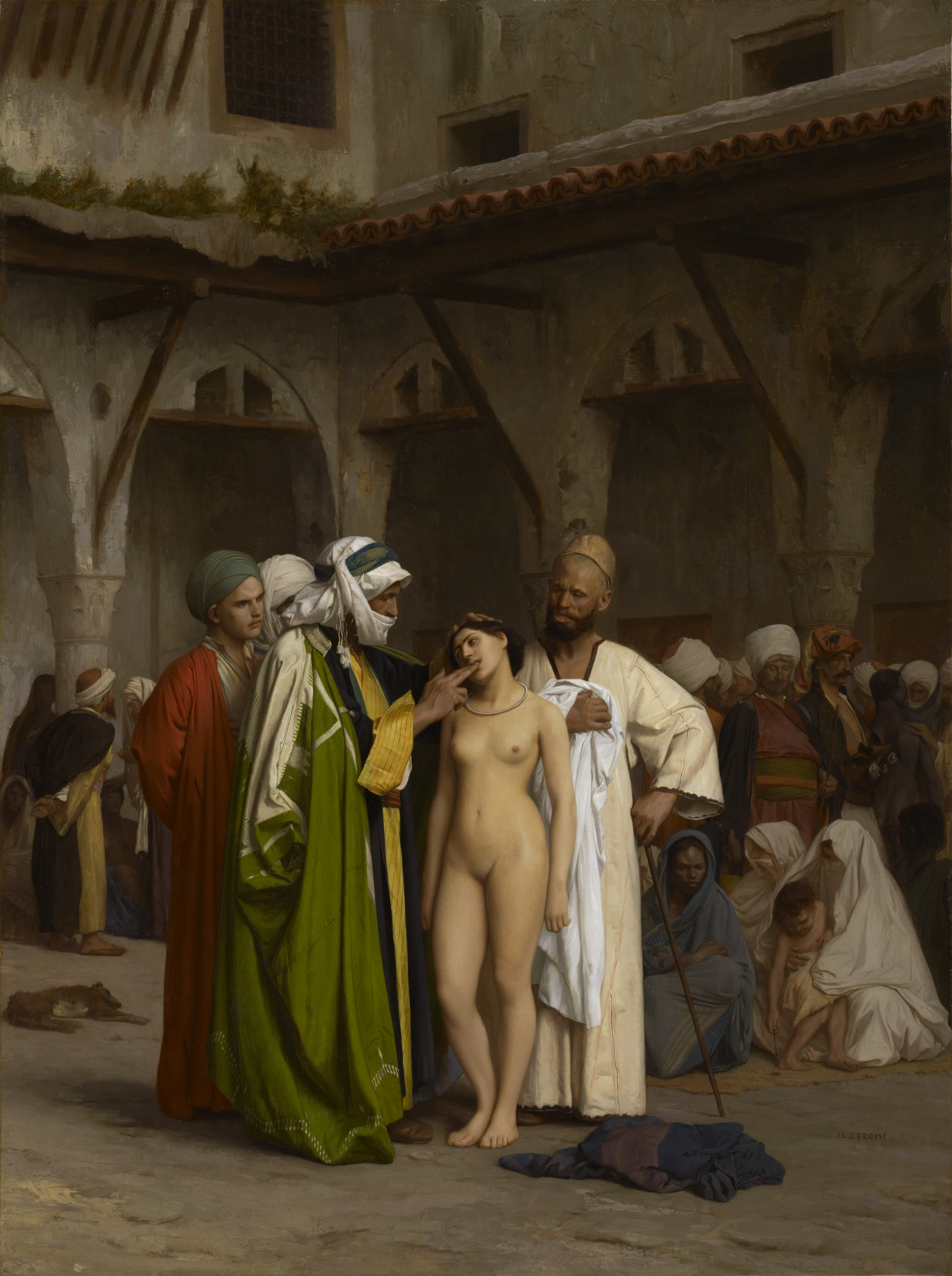
The Slave Market, by Jean-Léon Gérôme, 1866. This was a popular subject in 19th-century Orientalist painting, normally with a sexual element.

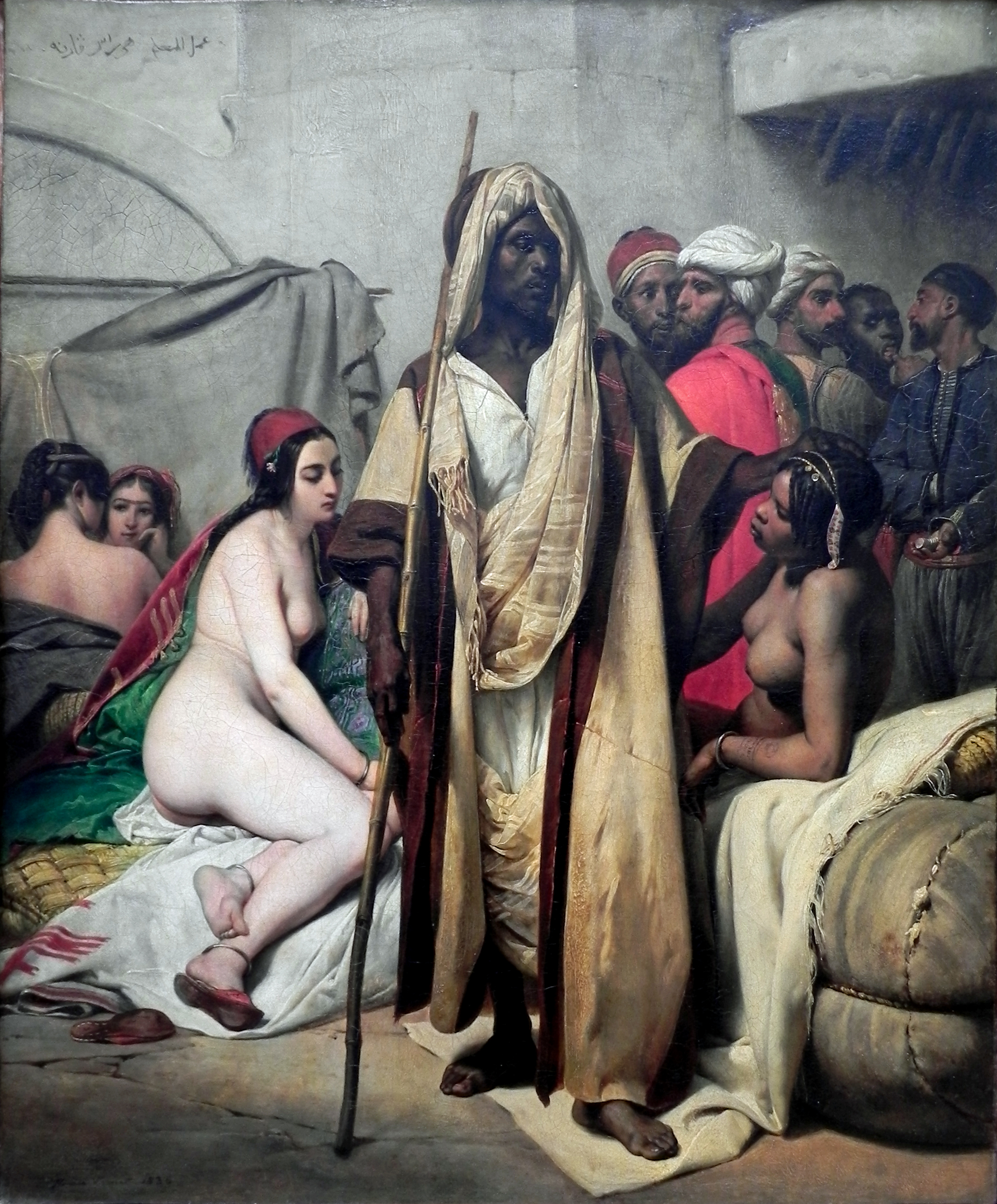
The Slave Market by Horace Vernet, 1836

In Somalia, the inhabiting Bantus are descended from Bantu groups that had settled in Southeast Africa after the initial expansion from Nigeria/Cameroon, and whose members were later captured and sold into the Arab slave trade.

It expanded significantly in late antiquity (1st century CE) with the rise of Byzantine and Sassanid trading enterprises. Muslim slave trading started in the 7th century, with the volume of trade fluctuating with the rise and fall of local powers. Beginning in the 16th century, slaves were traded to the Americas, including Caribbean colonies, as Northern, Western, and Southern European powers became involved in the slave trade. Trade declined with the abolition of slavery in the 19th century.

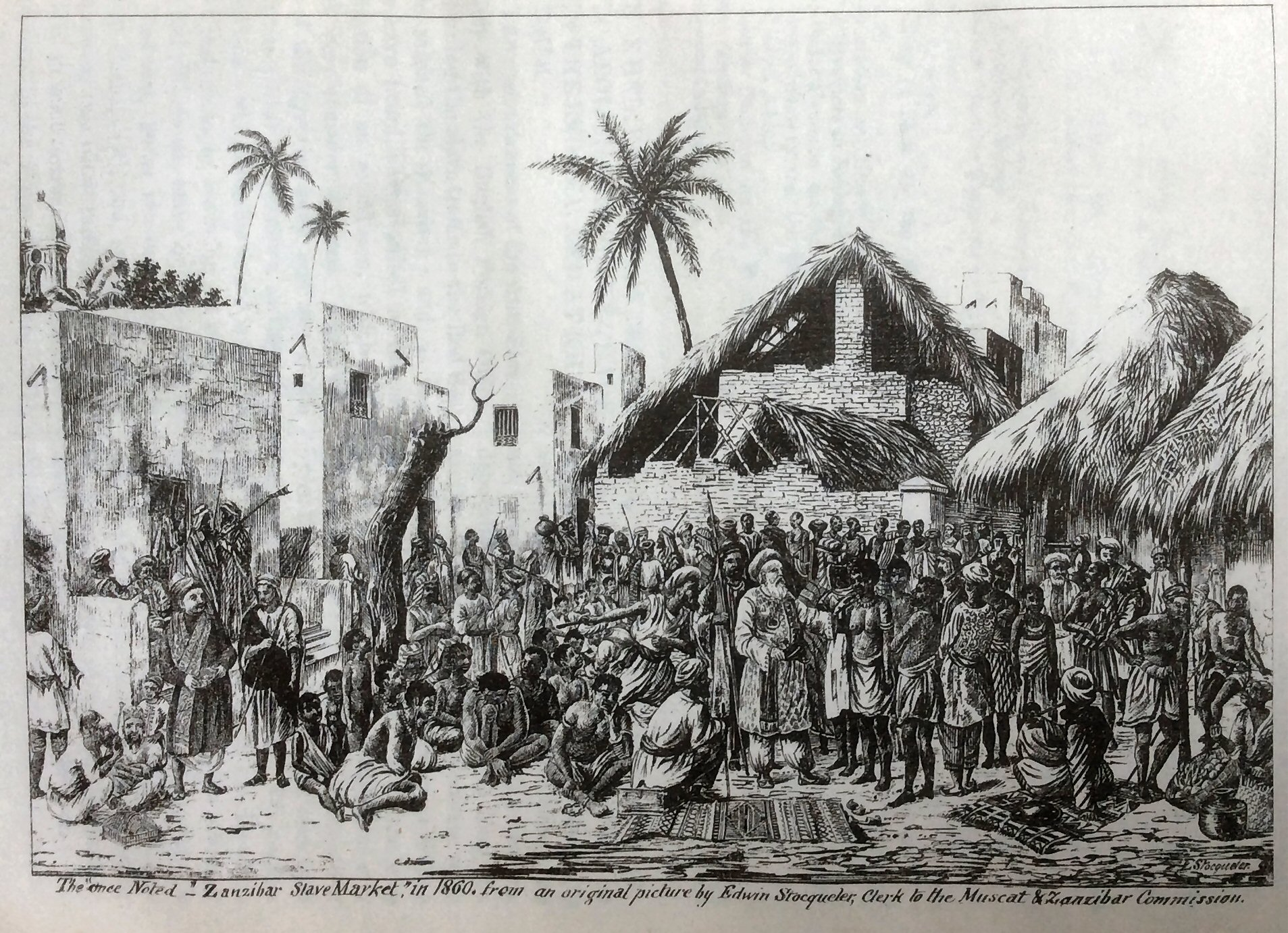
Zanzibar slave market in 1860, by Edwin Stocqueler

From 1800 to 1890, between 25,000–50,000 Bantu slaves are thought to have been sold from the slave market of Zanzibar to the Somali coast. Most of the slaves were from the Majindo, Makua, Nyasa, Yao, Zalama, Zaramo and Zigua ethnic groups of Tanzania, Mozambique and Malawi. Collectively, these Bantu groups are known as Mushunguli, which is a term taken from Mzigula, the Zigua tribe's word for "people" (the word holds multiple implied meanings including "worker", "foreigner", and "slave"). Bantu adult and children slaves (referred to collectively as jareer by their Somali masters) were purchased in the slave market exclusively to do undesirable work on plantation grounds.

Enslaved Africans were sold in the towns of the Arab world. In 1416, al-Maqrizi told how pilgrims coming from Takrur (near the Senegal River) had brought 1,700 slaves with them to Mecca. In North Africa, the main slave markets were in Morocco, Algiers, Tripoli and Cairo. Sales were held in public places or in souks.

Potential buyers made a careful examination of the "merchandise": they checked the state of health of a person who was often standing naked with wrists bound together. In Cairo, transactions involving eunuchs and concubines happened in private houses. Prices varied according to the slave's quality. Thomas Smee, the commander of the British research ship Ternate, visited such a market in Zanzibar in 1811 and gave a detailed description:

'The show' commences about four o'clock in the afternoon. The slaves, set off to the best advantage by having their skins cleaned and burnished with cocoa-nut oil, their faces painted with red and white stripes and the hands, noses, ears and feet ornamented with a profusion of bracelets of gold and silver and jewels, are ranged in a line, commencing with the youngest, and increasing to the rear according to their size and age. At the head of this file, which is composed of all sexes and ages from 6 to 60, walks the person who owns them; behind and at each side, two or three of his domestic slaves, armed with swords and spears, serve as guard. Thus ordered the procession begins, and passes through the market-place and the principle streets... when any of them strikes a spectator's fancy the line immediately stops, and a process of examination ensues, which, for minuteness, is unequalled in any cattle market in Europe. The intending purchaser having ascertained there is no defect in the faculties of speech, hearing, etc., that there is no disease present, next proceeds to examine the person; the mouth and the teeth are first inspected and afterwards every part of the body in succession, not even excepting the breasts, etc., of the girls, many of whom I have seen handled in the most indecent manner in the public market by their purchasers; indeed there is every reasons to believe that the slave-dealers almost universally force the young girls to submit to their lust previous to their being disposed of. From such scenes one turns away with pity and indignation.

=== North Africa ===
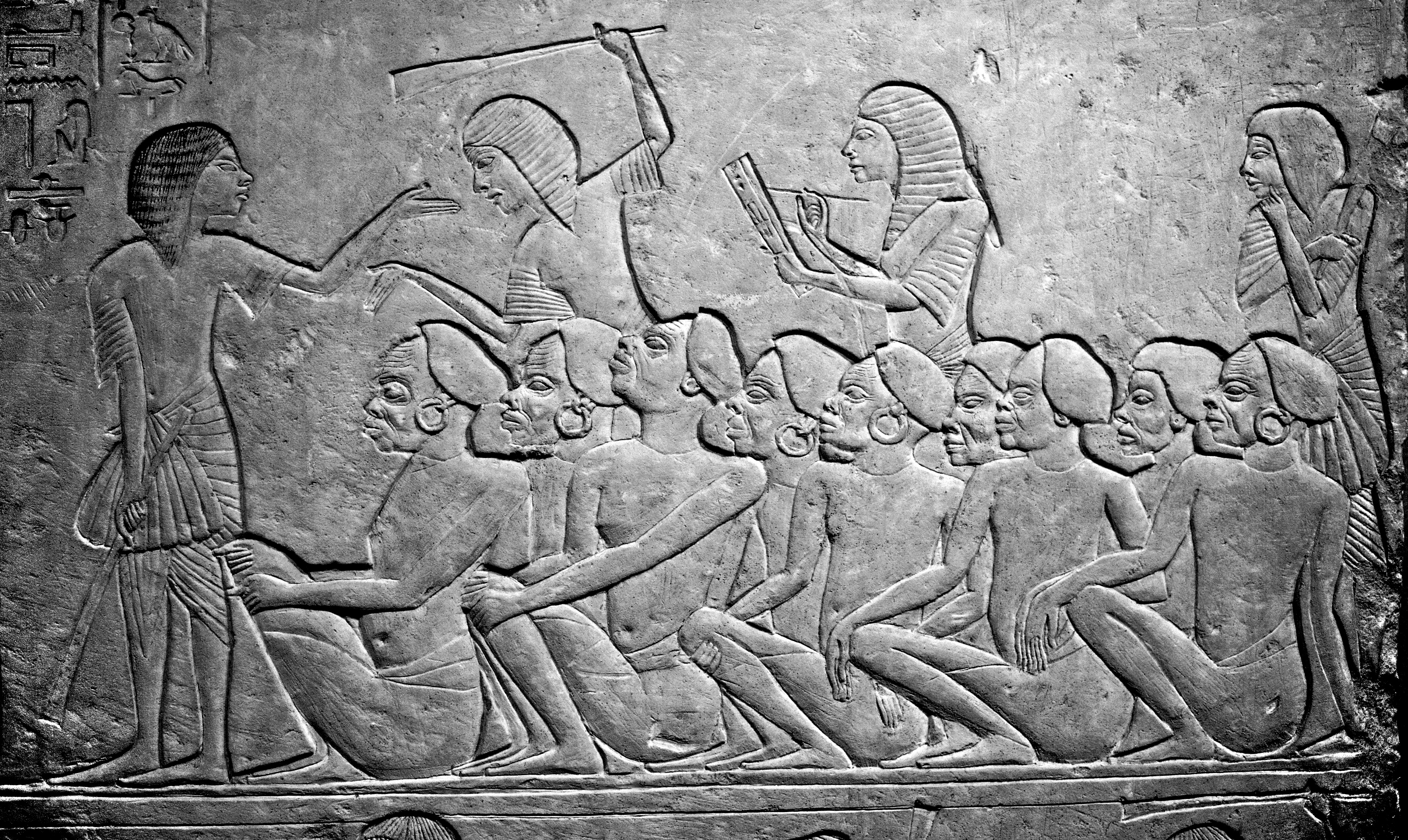
Ancient Egyptian slave market, with Nubian slaves waiting to be sold

The slave trade had existed in North Africa since antiquity, with a supply of sub-Saharan African slaves arriving through trans-Saharan trade routes. The towns on the North African coast were recorded in Roman times for their slave markets, and this trend continued into the medieval age. The Barbary slave trade on the Barbary Coast increased in influence in the 15th century, when the Ottoman Empire took over as rulers of the area. Coupled with this was an influx of Sephardi Jews and Moorish refugees, newly expelled from Spain after the Reconquista. The Barbary slave trade encompassed both African slavery and White slavery.

=== West Africa ===
The Velekete Slave Market established in 1502 in Badagry, Lagos State, was significant during the Atlantic slave trade in Badagry as it served as a business point where African middlemen sold slaves to European slave merchants which made it one of the most populous slave markets in West Africa.

== Europe and the Ottoman Empire ==
=== Southern Europe ===
The maritime town of Lagos, Portugal, was the first slave market created in Portugal for the sale of imported African slaves, the Mercado de Escravos, which opened in 1444. In 1441, the first slaves were brought to Portugal from northern Mauritania. Prince Henry the Navigator, major sponsor of the Portuguese African expeditions, as of any other merchandise, taxed one fifth of the selling price of the slaves imported to Portugal. In 1550, there were around 50,000 black African slaves in Lisbon. By 1552, African slaves made up 10% of the population of Lisbon. In the second half of the 16th century, the Crown gave up the monopoly on slave trade and the focus of European trade in African slaves shifted from import to Europe to slave transports directly to tropical colonies in the Americas—in the case of Portugal, especially Brazil. In the 15th century, one third of the slaves were resold to the African market in exchange of gold.

=== Northern and Eastern Europe ===
The Vikings trafficked European slaves, captured in Viking raids in Europe, to the East in two destinations from present-day Russia via the Volga trade route. One route led to slavery in the Abbasid Caliphate in the Middle East via the Caspian Sea, the Samanid slave trade, and Iran; the other, to the Byzantine Empire and the Mediterranean via Dnieper and the Black Sea slave trade.

People taken captive in Viking raids in Europe could be brought to Scandinavia or sold into Moorish Spain via the Dublin slave trade. Captives from Viking raids in Eastern Europe could be transported to Hedeby or Brännö and, from there by the Volga trade route, to Russia, where slaves and furs were sold to Byzantine and Muslim merchants in exchange for Arabic silver dirham and silk, which have been found in Birka, Wollin, and Dublin Initially, this trade route between Europe and the Abbasid Caliphate passed through the Khazar Kaghanate, but from the early tenth century it went through Volga Bulgaria and thence by caravan to Khwarazm, to the Samanid slave market in Central Asia, and finally by way of Iran to the Abbasid Caliphate.

Prague was the center of the Prague slave trade, in which pagan Eastern Europeans were trafficked from Eastern Europe to Prague, where they were purchased by slave traders who sold them into slavery in al-Andalus, territory ruled by Moslems on the Iberian Peninsula. Among other European slave markets, Genoa and Venice (centers of the Genoese slave trade and the Venetian) were well-known, their importance and demand growing after the great plague of the 14th century had decimated much of the native European work force.

=== Ottoman Empire ===
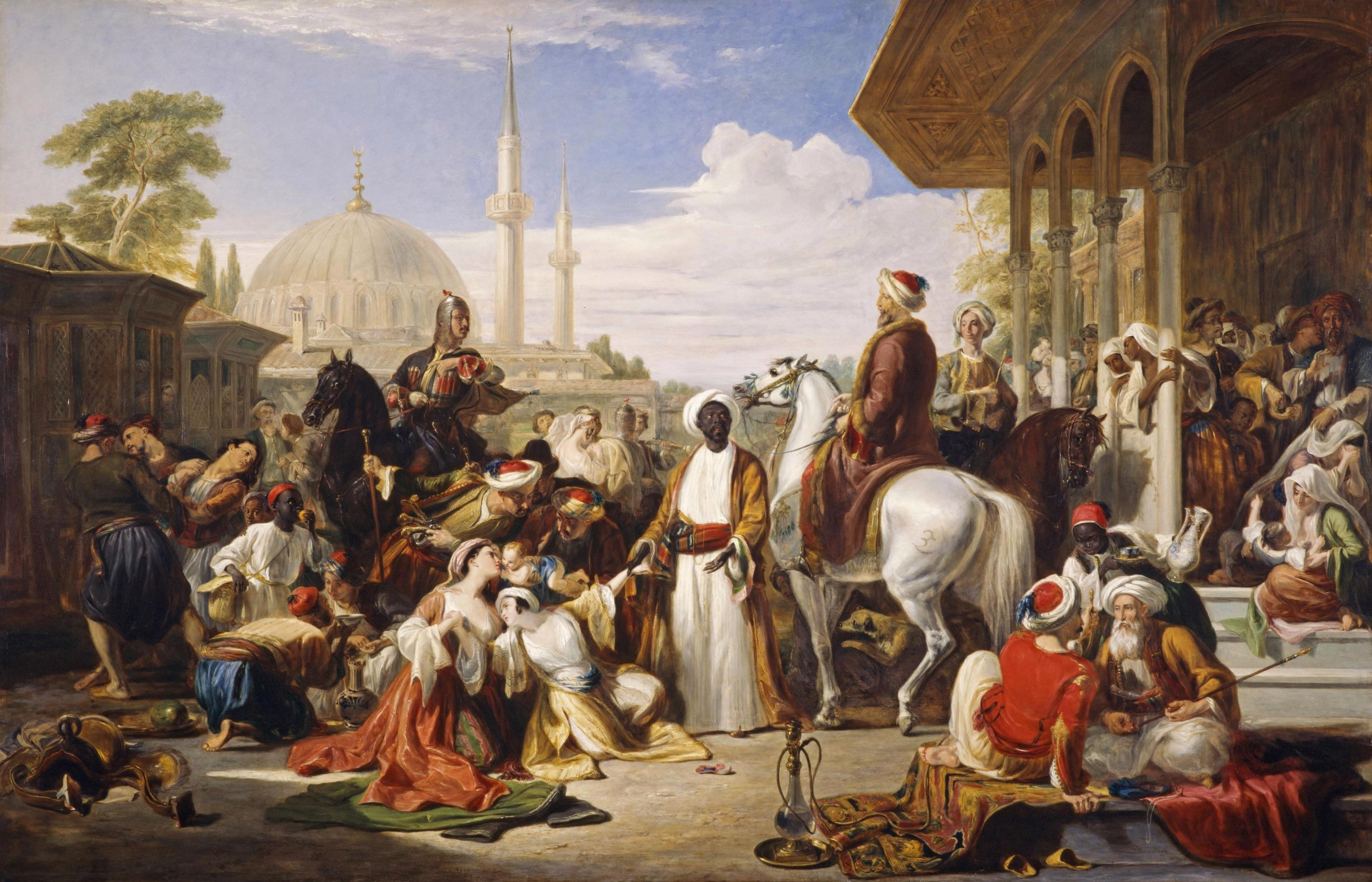
William Allan (1782-1850) - The Slave Market, Constantinople - NG 2400 - National Galleries of Scotland

In the Ottoman Empire during the mid-14th century, slaves were traded in special marketplaces called "Esir" or "Yesir" that were located in most towns and cities. It is said that Sultan Mehmed II "the Conqueror" established the first Ottoman slave market in Constantinople in the 1460s, probably where the former Byzantine slave market had stood. According to Nicolas de Nicolay, there were slaves of all ages and both sexes, they were displayed naked to be thoroughly checked by possible buyers.

In the early 18th century, the Crimean Khanate maintained a massive slave trade with the Ottoman Empire and the Middle East, exporting about 2 million slaves from Russia and Poland-Lithuania over the period 1500–1700. Caffa (modern Feodosia) became one of the best-known and significant trading ports and slave markets.

The last slave market in Europe was in Constantinople, the Ottoman capital. It was a destination for slaves trafficked from Europe via the Crimean slave trade and the Circassian slave trade, and from Africa via the Trans-Saharan slave trade, the Red Sea slave trade, and the Indian Ocean slave trade. The slave market was divided in different sections for male and female slaves. In the market bazaar for female slaves, the Avret Pazari, slave girls were exposed naked on the auction block and tied in position for presumptive buyers to inspect. The huge slave market in the Ottoman capital was closed by the Disestablishment of the Istanbul Slave Market edict in 1847. This edict did not ban the sale of slaves, but moved it indoors, thereby making it less visible.

== North America ==
=== The United States ===
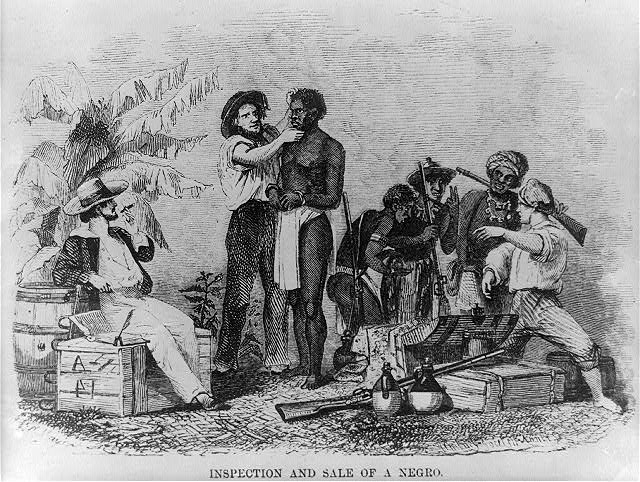
The inspection and sale of a slave.

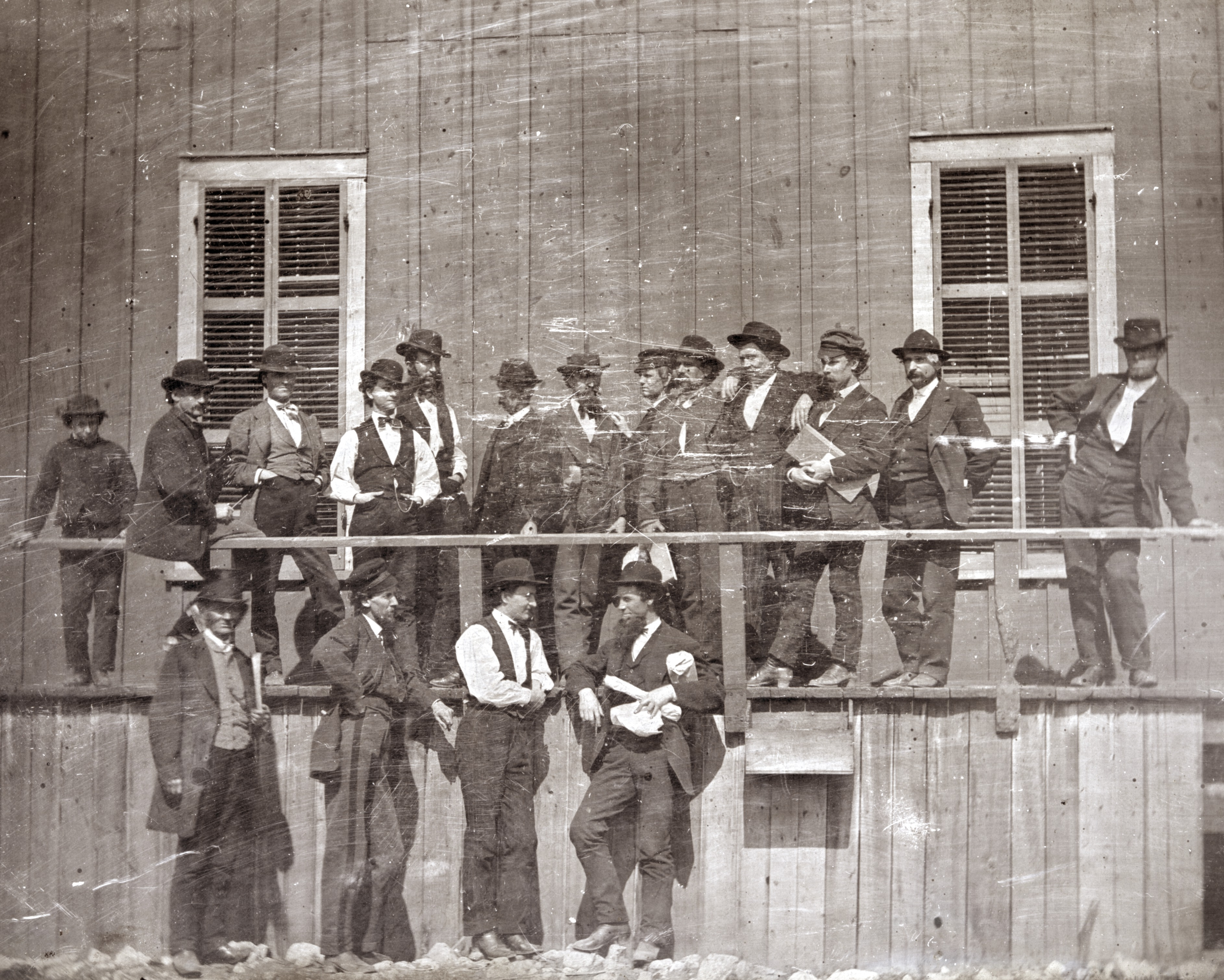
White men pose, 104 Locust Street, St. Louis, Missouri in 1852 at Lynch's Slave Market

In the history of slavery in the United States, the domestic slave trade had become a major economic activity by 1815, and lasted until the 1860s. Between 1830 and 1840, nearly 250,000 slaves were taken across state lines. In the 1850s, more than 193,000 were transported, and historians estimate nearly one million in total took part in the forced migration of this new Middle Passage. By 1860, the slave population in the United States had reached 4 million.

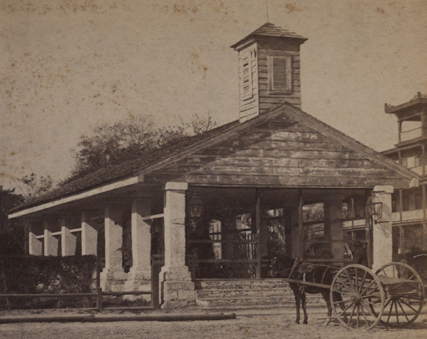
Old Slave Market, St. Augustine, Florida in 1886

In the 1840s, almost 300,000 slaves were transported, with Alabama and Mississippi receiving 100,000 each. During each decade between 1810 and 1860, at least 100,000 slaves were moved from their state of origin. In the final decade before the Civil War, 250,000 were moved. Historian Ira Berlin wrote:

The internal slave trade became the largest enterprise in the South outside the plantation itself, and probably the most advanced in its employment of modern transportation, finance, and publicity. The slave trade industry developed its own unique language, with terms such as "prime hands, bucks, breeding wenches, and "fancy girls" coming into common use.

The expansion of the interstate slave trade contributed to the "economic revival of once depressed seaboard states" as demand accelerated the value of slaves who were subject to sale.

Some traders moved their "chattels" by sea, with Norfolk to New Orleans being the most common route, but most slaves were forced to walk overland in coffles. Others were shipped downriver from such markets as Louisville on the Ohio River, and Natchez on the Mississippi. Traders created regular migration routes served by a network of slave pens, yards, and warehouses needed as temporary housing for the slaves. In addition, other vendors provided clothes, food, and supplies for slaves. As the trek advanced, some slaves were sold and new ones purchased. Berlin concluded, "In all, the slave trade, with its hubs and regional centers, its spurs and circuits, reached into every cranny of southern society. Few southerners, black or white, were untouched".

New Orleans, where French colonists had established sugarcane plantations and exported sugar as the chief commodity crop, became nationally important as a slave market and port, as slaves were shipped from there upriver by steamboat to plantations on the Mississippi River; it also sold slaves who had been shipped downriver from markets such as Louisville. By 1840, it had the largest slave market in North America. It became the wealthiest and the fourth-largest city in the nation, based chiefly on the slave trade and associated businesses. The trading season was from September to May, after the harvest.

One of the most famous remaining slave market buildings in the United States is the Old Slave Mart in Charleston, South Carolina. Throughout the first half of the 19th century, slaves brought into Charleston were sold at public auctions held on the north side of the Exchange and Provost building. After the city prohibited public slave auctions in 1856, enclosed slave markets sprang up along Chalmers, State, and Queen streets. One such market was Ryan's Mart, established by City Councilman and broker, Thomas Ryan and his business partner, James Marsh. Ryan's Mart originally consisted of a closed lot with three structures— a four-story barracoon or slave jail, a kitchen, and a morgue or "dead house".

In 1859, an auction master named Z. B. Oakes purchased Ryan's Mart, and built what is now the Old Slave Mart building for use as an auction gallery. The building's auction table was 3 feet (0.91 m) high and 10 feet (3.0 m) long and stood just inside the arched doorway. In addition to slaves, the market sold real estate and stock. Slave auctions at Ryan's Mart were advertised in broadsheets throughout the 1850s, some appearing as far away as Galveston, Texas.

== See also ==
- Barracoon
- House of Slaves
- Old Slave Mart
- Scramble (slave auction)
- Seasoning (slavery)
