= Avero House =

Historic house in Florida, United States

- U.S. National Register of Historic Places
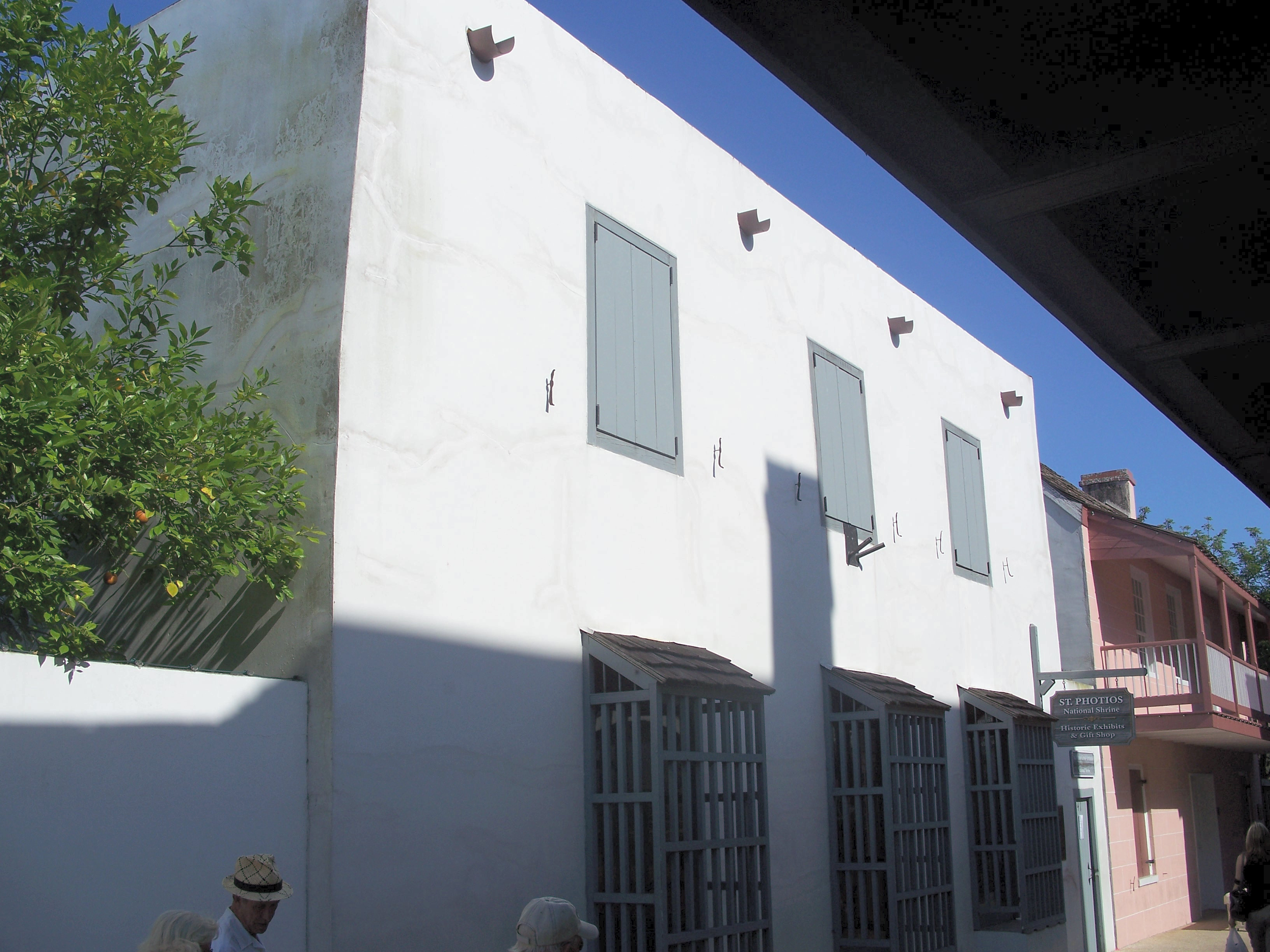

- Location within Florida
- Location: 41 St. George Street, St. Augustine, Florida
- Coordinates: 29.896341°N 81.313044°W
- Built: 1749
- NRHP reference No.: 72001459
- Added to NRHP: June 13, 1972

The Avero House is a historic house located at 41 St. George Street in St. Augustine, Florida, United States. The building is locally significant as one of 30 remaining houses within the historic district that pre-date 1821. It was once the site of a Minorcan Chapel. Today, the building is home to the St. Photios Greek Orthodox National Shrine.

The house was owned by the Avero family, Minorcan Spaniards, during the First Spanish Period (1565–1763). The family occupied the property from as early as 1712, though the current coquina structure dates to circa 1740s. After the Spanish evacuation in 1763, it was used during the British Period. In 1777, it served as a chapel for refugees from the failed New Smyrna colony, primarily Minorcans, Italians, and Greeks, led by Father Pedro Camps. Restored in the late 1970s, it now houses the St. Photios Greek Orthodox National Shrine, honoring the Greek indentured settlers of 1768.

== Description ==
The two-story structure features coquina walls in horizontal courses with lime mortar, plastered interior and exterior. It includes an open loggia on the southeast and a flat roof with copper scuppers. A 1763 map shows a U-shaped plan. The house was restored in 1979 to its 18th-century appearance after purchase by the Greek Orthodox Archdiocese in the 1960s.

== History ==
Although the house was apparently built around 1749, the first detailed information on its layout does not appear until a map from 1763.

=== First Spanish period ===
The property was associated with the Avero family, Minorcan residents in colonial St. Augustine, from at least 1712 until 1804 (excluding the British Period 1763–1784). The family, including daughters who inherited multiple nearby properties on St. George Street, was an example of Creole property transmission through women in Spanish Florida. The current structure, built of coquina stone, dates to the mid-18th century (circa 1740s), replacing earlier buildings on the site.

=== British and Second Spanish periods ===
During the British Period (1763–1784), the evacuated house was occupied by others (e.g., shown as owned by 'Mr. Kipp' on 1765 maps). In 1777, following the collapse of the indigo plantation at New Smyrna, survivors (primarily Minorcans with Greeks and Italians) fled to St. Augustine. Spanish Governor Vicente Manuel de Zéspedes granted the abandoned Avero House to Father Pedro Camps for use as a chapel and oratory by these Catholic refugees for about seven years. This earned it the local name 'Minorcan Chapel'.

=== Modern use and restoration ===
The Greek Orthodox Archdiocese of North and South America purchased the building in 1966 and restored the house to its 1730s appearance. Today the house is open to the public as the St. Photios Greek Orthodox National Shrine, dedicated to the first colony of Greek people who came to America in 1768. The Shrine includes the St. Photios Chapel which features Byzantine iconography, the relics of 18 saints of the Early Church, and a museum with a permanent exhibit about the life of early Greek settlers as well as temporary exhibits that are changed out annually.

The Avero House was added to the U.S. National Register of Historic Places on June 13, 1972.

== Gallery ==
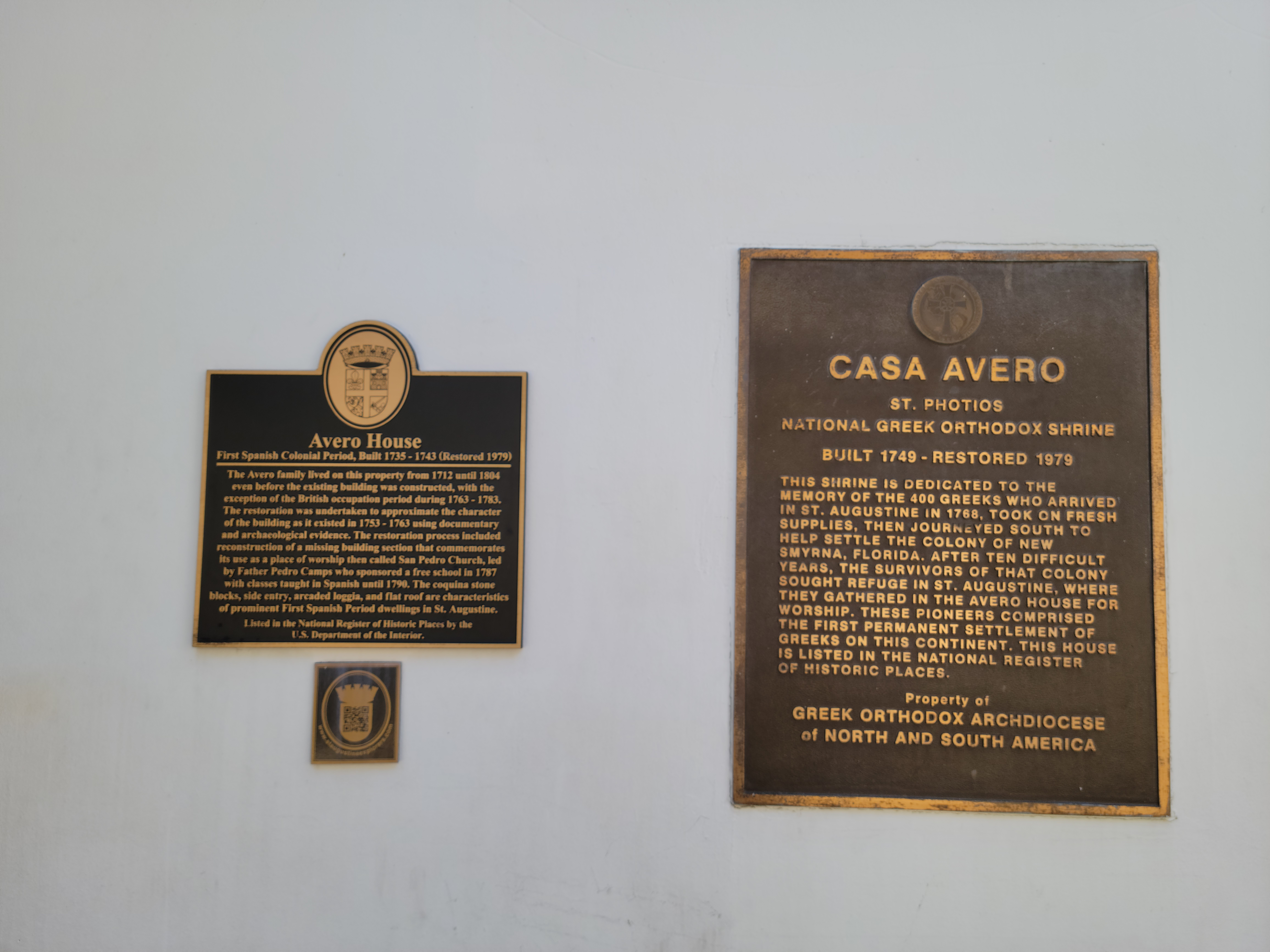
Historic marker on exterior

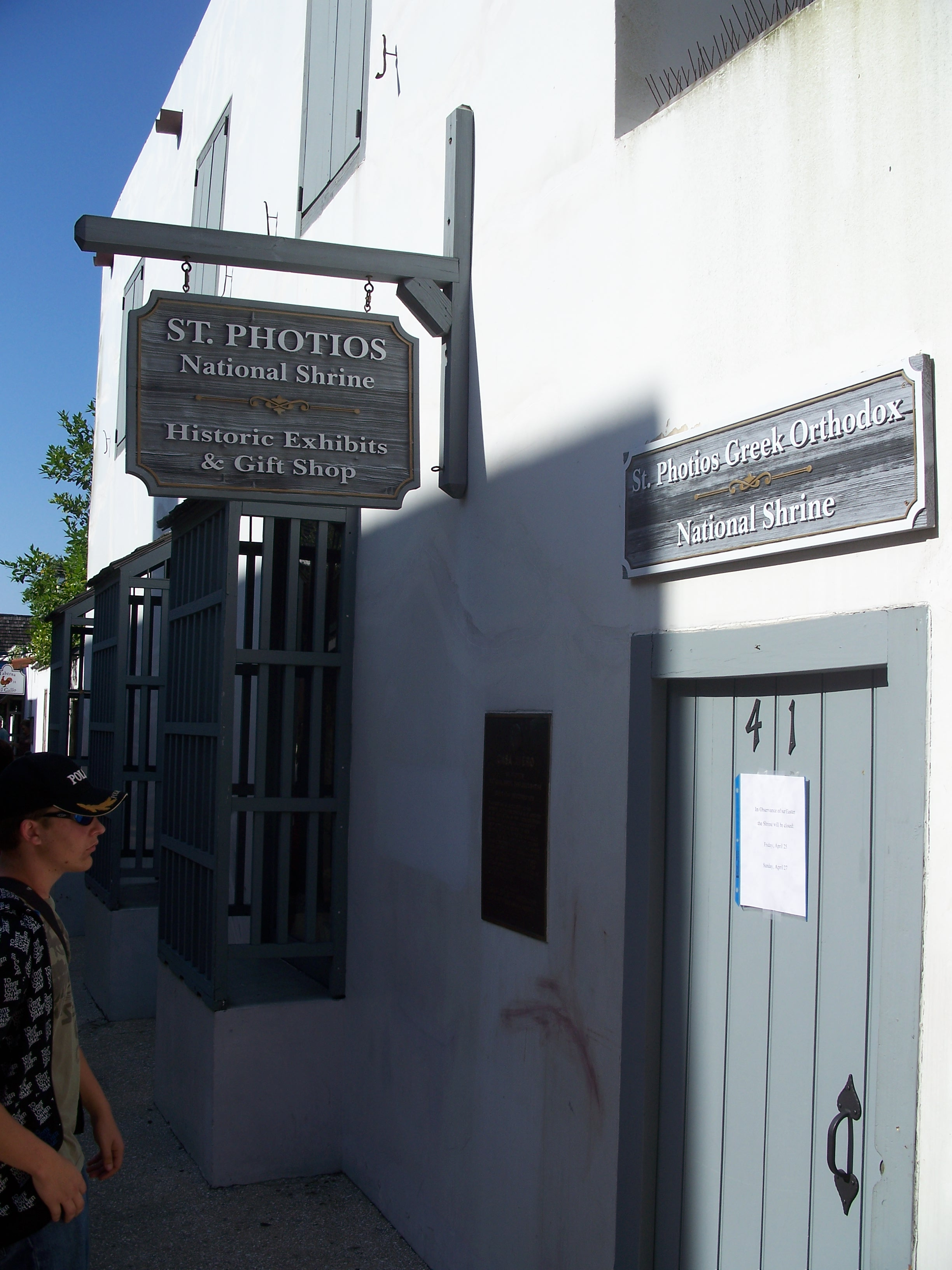
Entrance to St. Photios Shrine
