= Old Slave Market, St. Augustine =

Historic structure in Florida

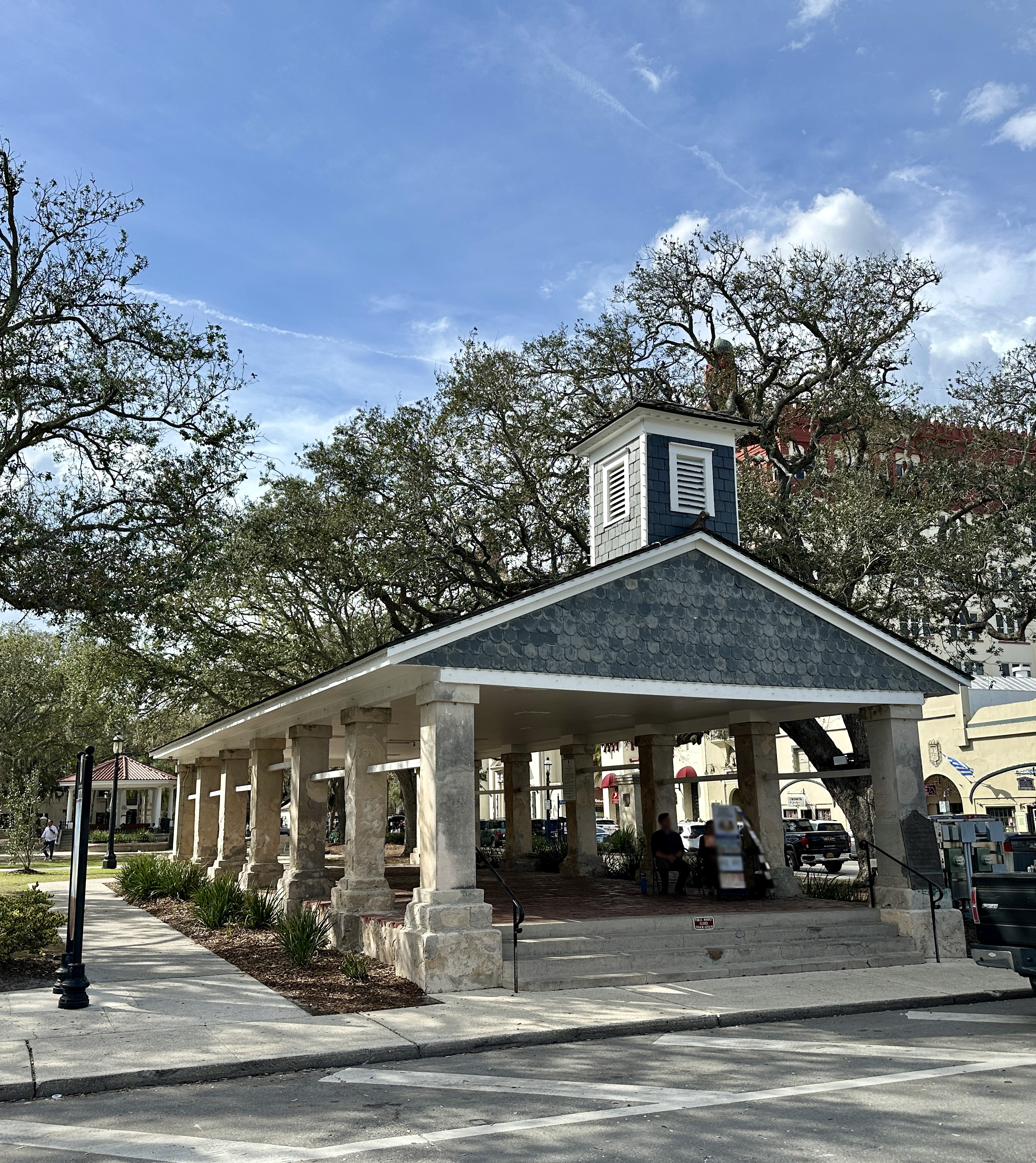
A view of the Eastern entrance to the Old Slave Market in St. Augustine, FL.

The Historic Public Market, historically known as the Old Slave Market, Old Spanish Market or Public Market is a historic open-air market building in St. Augustine, Florida in the United States. In the late 19th and early 20th centuries it was frequently photographed and marketed as a kind of "heritage tourism" landmark. In 1964 it was the site of a Third Klan-led white-mob attack on a march in support of the Civil Rights bill.

Old Slave Market in the Plaza de la Constitución of St. Augustine, FL.

== History ==
Sited above a centrally located sulfur spring, the shelter that became the Old Slave Market may have been originally erected to shelter the town's water pump and adapted later for use as a commercial market.

The history of the building is blurry enough that it could be used to represent "a sentimentalized past...although the St. Augustine market had been used primarily as the beef market, it was also sometimes used by auctioneers who sold real and personal estates, most likely including slaves." Beginning in the late 19th century, photographs and postcards featured the market as a quaint relic, images that often placed local African-American men in front of the building for added effect. Other residents of St. Augustine determinedly resisted the Slave Market characterization, claiming that slave sales occasionally happened near it but not in it, that Florida soil was too poor to support a slave-based agriculture anyway, and that the building had only been used for public slave whippings, not for public slave sales.

In 1883 the building was described in a tourist guide, but without much confidence: "Four years ago it was used as a meat market, but since, the Council and a private gentleman have rescued it from what must have been degrading to this proud piece of Spanish antiquity, of which very little is known. We have been told that before the war it was used as a slave market. Whenever a sale was to take place the bell in the cupola would be rung to notify the public. The reader will please understand that the compiler of this Guide does not hold himself responsible for the slave-market story, but, in the words of the old sergeant at the fort, will say: 'I'm only giving it to yeas it was given to me, d'ye moind now?'" In March 1887, the body of William W. Loring, a former Confederate general, lay in state at the old slave market for a morning. In 1887 the wooden framework of the old market house burned in the St. Augustine fire. The structure was reconstructed; in 1888 a newspaper reported, "Draymen are hauling lumber for the restoring of the old slave market in the plaza."

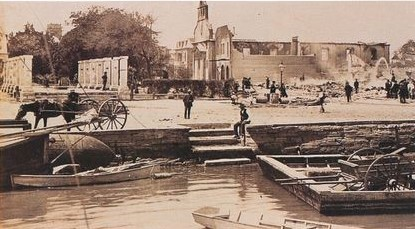
Aftermath of the 1887 fire; the columns are what's left of the public market

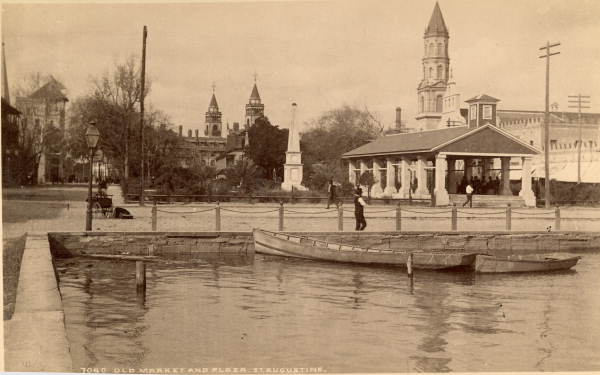
Old Market and plaza, St. Augustine c. 1900

In the 1950s, tourist guides described it as an "outdoor room" where all ages could meet to play "a game or two of cards or checkers." In 1964, Dr. Martin Luther King Jr. was staying at a house in St. Augustine while Lyndon B. Johnson wrangled Congressional support for what would eventually become the Civil Rights Act of 1964. On the evening of May 28, 1964, King supporters Andrew Young and Hosea Williams led a march in support of the bill; some 400 people made their way from St. Paul AME Church to site of the Old Slave Market in the town square. Upon arrival, they were attacked by 250 whites wielding bike chains and tire irons. The cops looked on but did not act, other than to unleash a police dog on a white King aide named Harry Boyte. Later that night someone fired 14 rifle shots at the house where King was staying.

== See also ==
- History of St. Augustine, Florida
