= Fountain of Youth Archaeological Park =

Private archaeological park

- U.S. National Register of Historic Places
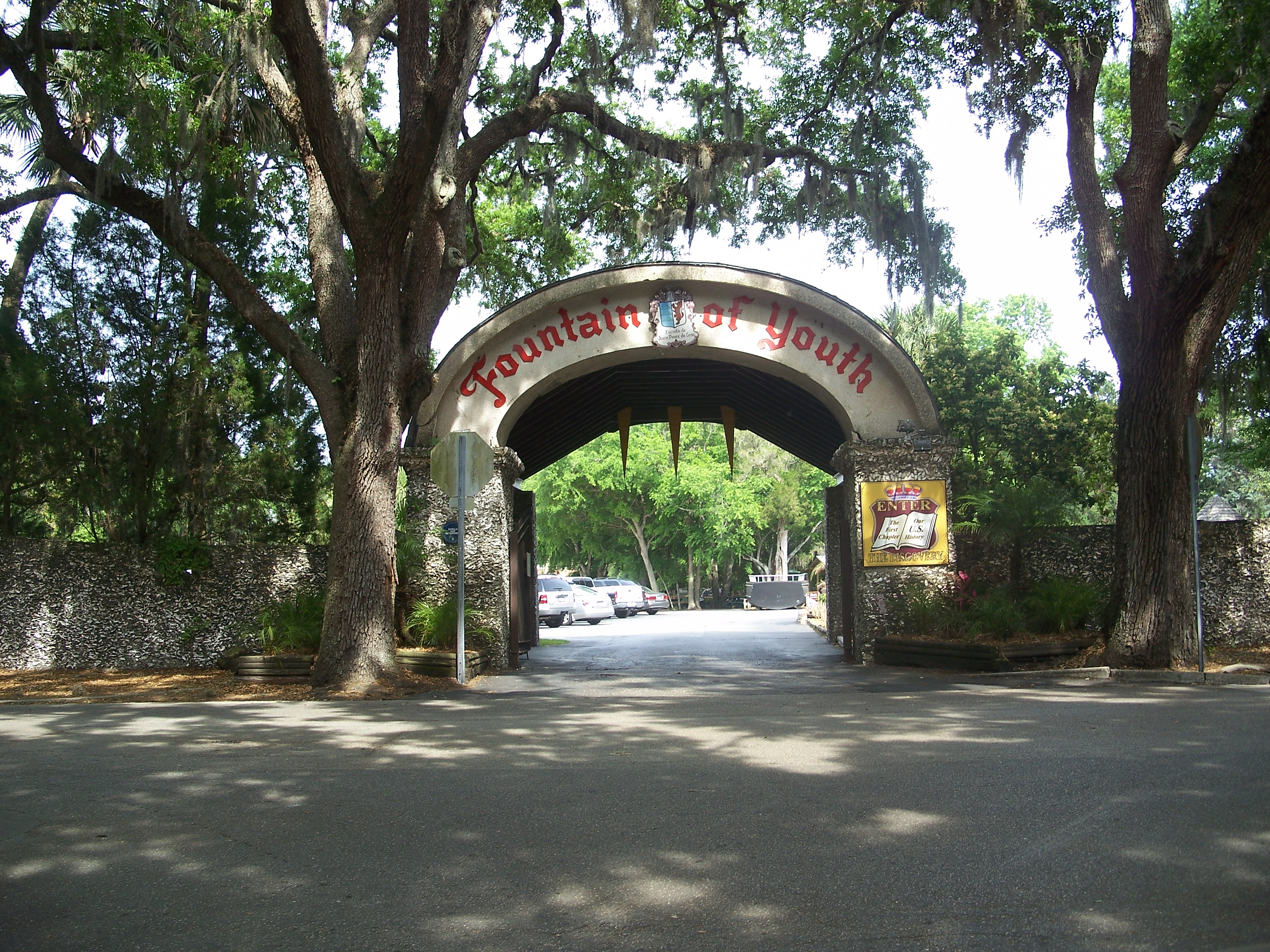
- Entrance to the Fountain of Youth Park (2010)

- Location within Florida
- Location: 11 Magnolia Ave.; St. Augustine, Florida
- Coordinates: 29.90731°N 81.31614°W
- NRHP reference No.: 16000361
- Added to NRHP: June 13, 2016

The Fountain of Youth Archaeological Park is a privately owned 15-acre (61,000 m^{2}) park in St. Augustine, Florida, located along Hospital Creek, part of the Intracoastal Waterway. It has been touted as the likely 1513 Florida landing site of Spanish explorer Ponce de Leon, although no evidence has been found to substantiate this claim. Recent research by amateur historian Douglas Peck has placed another possible landing site in the vicinity of Melbourne Beach in Brevard County.

The park contains a well claimed to be the freshwater source referred to by Antonio de Herrera y Tordesillas in his Historia general de los hechos de los castellanos en las Islas y Tierra Firme del mar Océano and supposedly sought by Ponce de Leon, but there is no supporting evidence. Archaeological excavations made by Dr. Kathleen Deagan on the park's grounds in the 1990s uncovered remains of the first Spanish settlement and its fortifications in St. Augustine.

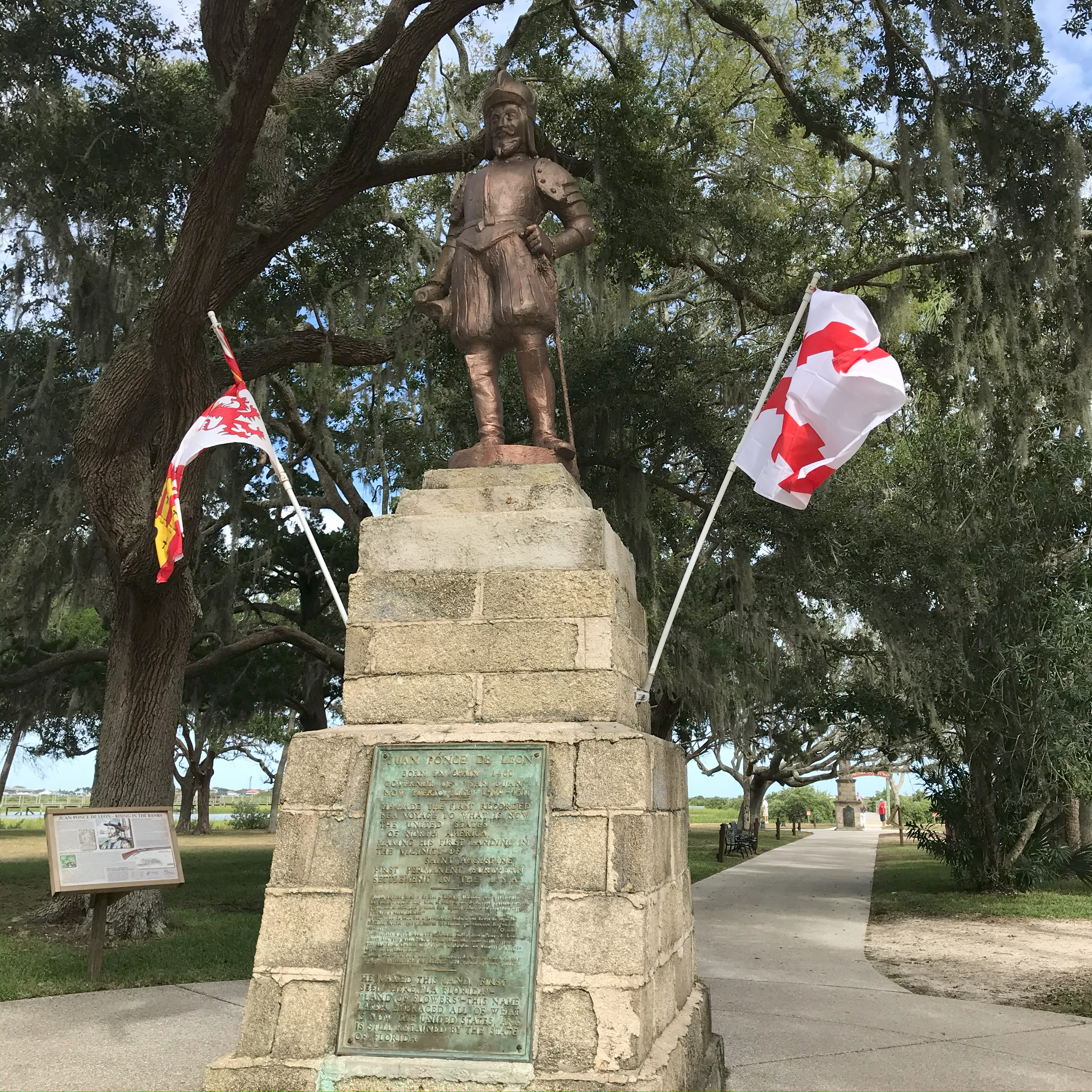
Ponce de Leon Statue at the Fountain of Youth

== History ==
Beginning in the 1860s, there were a series of small attractions on the grounds of the present-day Fountain of Youth Archaeological Park. These attractions showcased a well described as a "spring" and the attractive grounds surrounding it. The attraction was enlarged by Luella Day McConnell in 1904. "Diamond Lil", as she was known, fabricated stories to amuse and appall the city's residents and tourists until her accidental death in 1927.

The Park was purchased in 1927 by Walter B. Fraser, a Georgia resident who soon relocated to St. Augustine, Florida and became active in local politics. During the 1930s Fraser organized St. Augustine's first formal restoration movement, which was the forerunner of the preservation program which eventually became the Historic St. Augustine Preservation Board. The park was listed on the National Register of Historic Places in 2016.

From 1933 to 1943 Fraser served on the City Commission, the last seven of those years as mayor. During that time he purchased the Oldest Orange Grove and the Oldest School House. He built WFOY radio and purchased the Markland estate adjacent to the Ponce de Leon Hotel, and served in the Florida Senate from 1944 to 1948.
