= History of St. Augustine, Florida =

St. Augustine, Florida, the oldest continuously occupied settlement of European origin in the continental United States, was founded in 1565 by Spanish admiral Pedro Menéndez de Avilés. The Spanish Crown issued an asiento to Menéndez, signed by King Philip II on March 20, 1565, granting him various titles, including that of adelantado of Florida, and expansive privileges to exploit the lands in the vast territory of Spanish Florida, called La Florida by the Spaniards. This contract directed Menéndez to explore the region's Atlantic coast and report on its features, with the object of finding a suitable location to establish a permanent settlement from which the Spanish treasure fleet could be defended and Spain's claimed territories in North America protected against incursions by other European powers.

== Early exploration and attempts at settlement ==
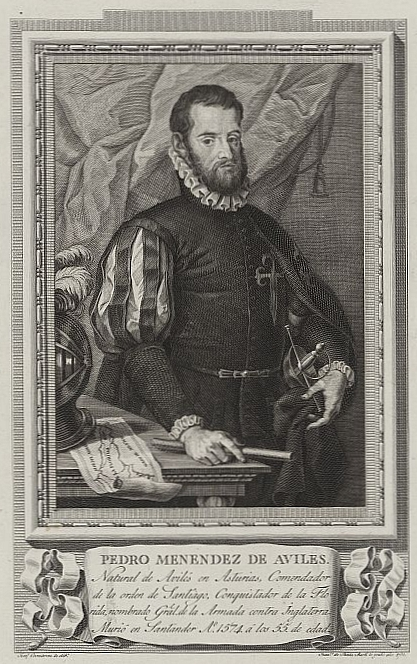
Pedro Menéndez de Avilés

The first European known to have explored the coasts of Florida was the Spanish explorer and governor of Puerto Rico, Juan Ponce de León, who likely ventured in 1513 as far north as the vicinity of the future St. Augustine, naming the peninsula he believed to be an island "La Florida" and claiming it for the Spanish crown. Prior to the founding of St. Augustine in 1565, several earlier attempts at European colonization in what is now Florida were made by both Spain and France, but all failed.

The French exploration of the area began in 1562, under the command of the Huguenot colonizer, Captain Jean Ribault. Ribault explored the St. Johns River to the north of St. Augustine before sailing further north up the Atlantic coast, ultimately founding the short-lived Charlesfort on what is now known as Parris Island, South Carolina. In 1564, Ribault's former lieutenant René Goulaine de Laudonnière headed a new colonization effort. Laudonnière explored St. Augustine Inlet and the Matanzas River, which the French named Rivière des Dauphins (River of Dolphins). There they made contact with the local Timucua chief, Seloy, a subject of the powerful Saturiwa chiefdom, before heading north to the St. Johns River. There they established Fort Caroline.

Later that year a group of mutineers from Fort Caroline fled, attacking Spanish vessels in the Caribbean. The Spanish used this as a pretext to locate and destroy Fort Caroline, fearing it would serve as a base for future piracy, and wanting to discourage further French colonization. King Philip II of Spain quickly dispatched Pedro Menéndez de Avilés to go to Florida and establish a center of operations from which to attack the French.

== Founding ==
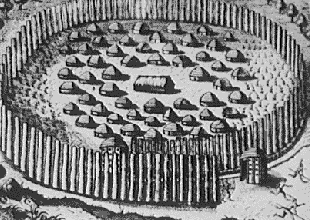
A palisaded Timucua village, in an engraving supposedly based on a sketch by Jacques le Moyne

Pedro Menéndez's ships first sighted land on August 28, 1565, the feast day of St. Augustine of Hippo. In honor of the patron saint of his home town of Avilés, he named his settlement San Agustín. The Spanish sailed through the inlet into Matanzas Bay and disembarked near the Timucua town of Seloy on September 6. Menéndez's immediate goal was to quickly construct fortifications to protect his people and supplies as they were unloaded from the ships, and then to make a proper survey of the area to determine the best place to erect the fort.

The location of this early fort has been confirmed through archaeological excavations directed by Kathleen Deagan on the grounds of what is now the Fountain of Youth Archaeological Park. It is known that the Spanish occupied several Native American structures in Seloy village, whose chief, the cacique Seloy, was allied with the Saturiwa, Laudonnière's allies. It is possible, but not yet demonstrated by any archaeological evidence, that Menéndez fortified one of the occupied Timucua structures to use as his first fort at Seloy.

In the meantime, Jean Ribault, Laudonnière's old commander, arrived at Fort Caroline with more settlers, as well as soldiers and weapons to defend them. He also took over the governorship of the settlement. Despite Laudonnière's wishes, Ribault put most of these soldiers aboard his ships for an assault on St. Augustine. However, he was surprised at sea by a violent storm that lasted several days and wrecked his ships further south on the coast. This gave Menéndez the opportunity to march his forces overland for a surprise dawn attack on the Fort Caroline garrison, which then numbered several hundred people. Laudonnière and some survivors fled to the woods, and the Spanish killed almost everyone in the fort except for the women and children. With the French displaced, Menéndez rechristened the fort "San Mateo", and appropriated it for his own purposes. The Spanish then returned south and eventually encountered the survivors of Ribault's fleet near the inlet at the southern end of Anastasia Island. There Menéndez executed most of the survivors, including Ribault; the inlet has ever since been called Matanzas, the Spanish word for "slaughters".

In 1566, Martín de Argüelles was born in Saint Augustine, the first birth of a child of European ancestry recorded in what is now the continental United States, This was 21 years before the English settlement at Roanoke Island in Virginia Colony, and 42 years before the successful settlements of Santa Fe, New Mexico, and Jamestown, Virginia. In 1606, the first recorded birth of a black child in the continental United States was listed in the Cathedral Parish archives, thirteen years before enslaved Africans were first brought to the English colony at Jamestown in 1619. In territory under the jurisdiction of the United States, only Puerto Rico has continuously occupied European-established settlements older than St. Augustine.

== Spanish period ==
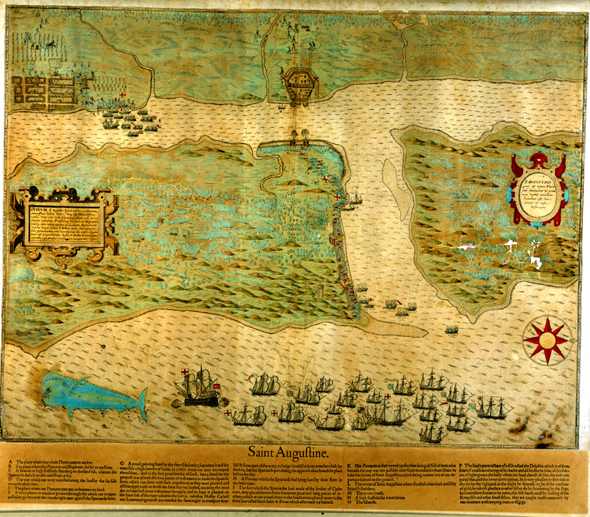
Map depicting Sir Francis Drake's 1586 attack on St. Augustine

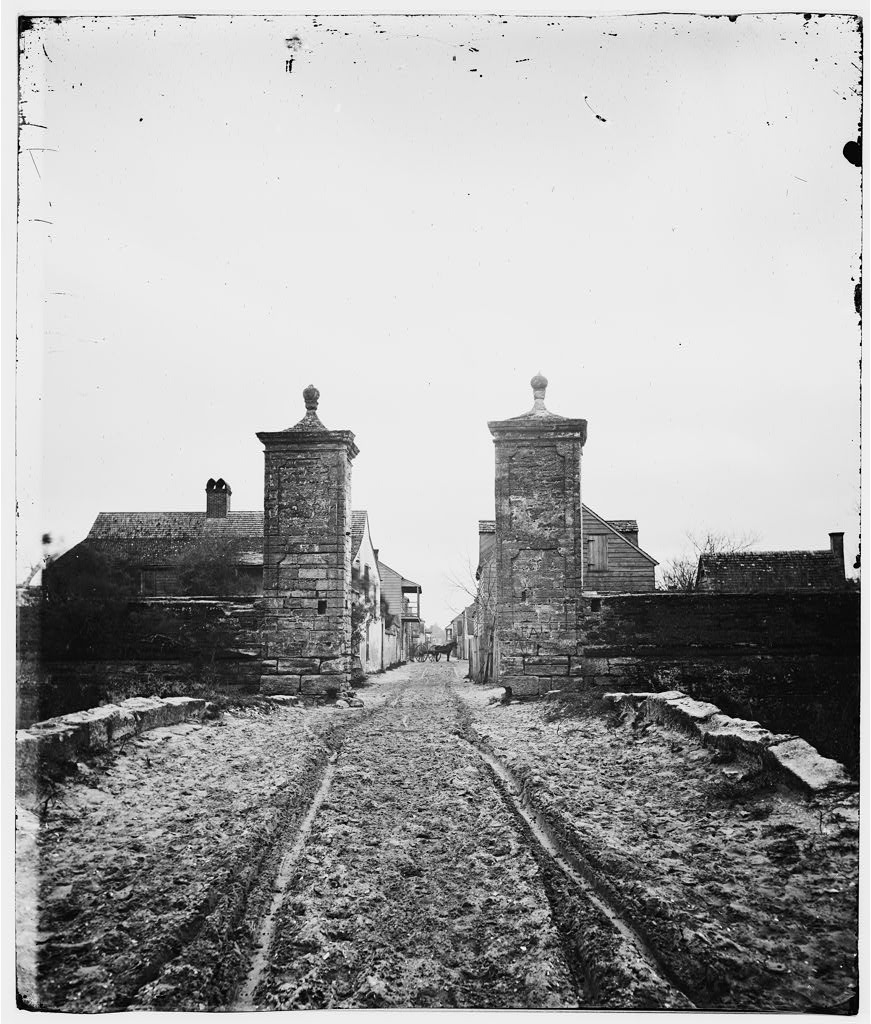
City Gate, St. Augustine c. 1861–65 View looking into town, St. George Street

St. Augustine was intended to be a base for further colonial expansion across what is now the southeastern United States, but such efforts were hampered by apathy and hostility on the part of the Native Americans towards becoming Spanish subjects. The Saturiwa, one of the two principal chiefdoms in the area, remained openly hostile. In 1566, the Saturiwa burned St. Augustine and the settlement was relocated. Traditionally it was thought to have been moved to its present location, though some documentary evidence suggests it was first moved to a location on Anastasia Island. At any rate, it was certainly in its present location by the end of the 16th century.

The settlement also faced attacks from European forces. In April 1568 the French soldier Dominique de Gourgue led an attack on Spanish holdings. With the aid of the Saturiwa, Tacatacuru, and other Timucua peoples who had been friendly with Laudonnière, de Gourgues attacked and burned Fort San Mateo, the former Fort Caroline. He executed his prisoners in revenge for the 1565 massacre, but did not approach St. Augustine. Additional French expeditions were primarily raids and could not dislodge the Spanish from St. Augustine. On June 6, 1586, English privateer Sir Francis Drake raided St. Augustine, burning it and driving surviving Spanish settlers into the wilderness. However, lacking sufficient forces or authority to establish an English settlement, Drake left the area, instead heading north to establish contact with the English colony at Roanoke.

In 1668, English privateer Robert Searle attacked and plundered St. Augustine. In the aftermath of his raid, the Spanish began in 1672 to construct a more secure fortification, the Castillo de San Marcos. It stands today as the oldest fort in the United States. Its construction took a quarter of a century, with many later additions and modifications.

The Spanish did not import many slaves to Florida for labor, since it was primarily a military outpost without a plantation economy like that of the British colonies. As the British planted settlements south along the Atlantic coast, the Spanish encouraged British slaves to escape to sanctuary in Florida. If the fugitives converted to Catholicism and swore allegiance to the king of Spain, they would be given freedom, arms, and supplies. Over time, St. Augustine would become a major destination for runaway slaves.

By 1683, a militia unit of free black people was formed for the defense of St. Augustine. Many of those in the unit could trace their lineage for several generations back to Spain. The militia unit served as a means for St. Augustine citizens of African descent to increase their standing in society as well as improve race relations with the other Spaniards.

Moving southward on the coast from the northern colonies, the British founded Charleston in 1670 and Savannah in 1733. In response, Spanish Governor Manuel de Montiano in 1738 established the first legally recognized free community of ex-slaves, known as Gracia Real de Santa Teresa de Mose, or Fort Mose, to serve as a defensive outpost two miles north of St. Augustine.

In 1740, British forces attacked St. Augustine from their colonies in the Carolinas and Georgia. The largest and most successful of these attacks was organized by Governor and General James Oglethorpe of Georgia; he split the Spanish-Seminole alliance when he gained the help of Ahaya the Cowkeeper, chief of the Alachua band of the Seminole tribe. The Seminole then occupied territory mostly in the north of Florida, but later migrated into the center and south of the peninsula.

In the largest campaign of 1740, Oglethorpe commanded several thousand colonial militia and British regulars, along with Alachua band warriors, and invaded Spanish Florida. He conducted the Siege of St. Augustine as part of the War of Jenkins' Ear (1739–42). During this siege, the black community of St. Augustine was important in resisting the British forces. The leader of Fort Mose during the battle was Capt. Francisco Menendez: born in Africa, he twice escaped from slavery. In Florida, he played an important role in defending St. Augustine from British raids. The Fort Mose site (of which only ruins remain) is now owned and maintained by the Florida Park Service. It has been designated a National Historic Landmark.

== British period ==
In 1763, the Treaty of Paris ended the Seven Years' War. Spain ceded Florida and St. Augustine to the British, in exchange for the British relinquishing control of occupied Havana. With the change of government, most of the Spanish Floridians and many freedmen departed from St. Augustine for Cuba. Only a few remained to handle unsold property and settle affairs.

James Grant was appointed the first governor of East Florida. He served from 1764 until 1771, when he returned to Britain due to illness. He was replaced as governor by Patrick Tonyn. During this brief period, the British converted the monks' quarters of the former Franciscan monastery into military barracks, which were named St. Francis Barracks. They also built The King's Bakery, which is believed to be the only extant structure in the city built entirely during the British period.

The Lieutenant Governor of East Florida under Governor Grant was John Moultrie, who was born in South Carolina. He had served under Grant as a major in the Cherokee War. During the American War of Independence, he remained loyal to the British Crown, but he had three brothers who served in the Patriot army.

Moultrie was granted large tracts of land in the St. Augustine vicinity, upon which he established a plantation he called "Bella Vista." He owned another 2,000-acre (8.1 km^{2}) plantation in the Tomoka River basin named "Rosetta". While acting as the lieutenant governor, he lived in the Peck House on St. George Street.

During the British period, Andrew Turnbull, a friend of Grant, established the settlement of New Smyrna in 1768. Turnbull recruited indentured servants from the Mediterranean area, primarily the island of Minorca. The conditions at New Smyrna were so abysmal that the settlers rebelled en masse in 1777; they walked the 70 miles (110 km) to St. Augustine, where Governor Tonyn gave them refuge. The Minorcans and their descendants stayed on in St. Augustine through the subsequent changes of flags, and marked the community with their language, culture, cuisine and customs.

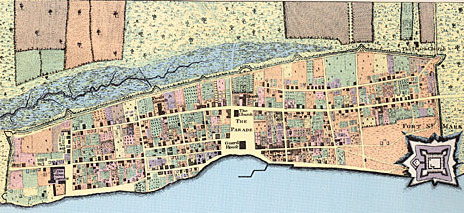
1763 map of St. Augustine, capital of British East Florida drawn by Thomas Jeffrey of the Royal Engineers

== Second Spanish period ==
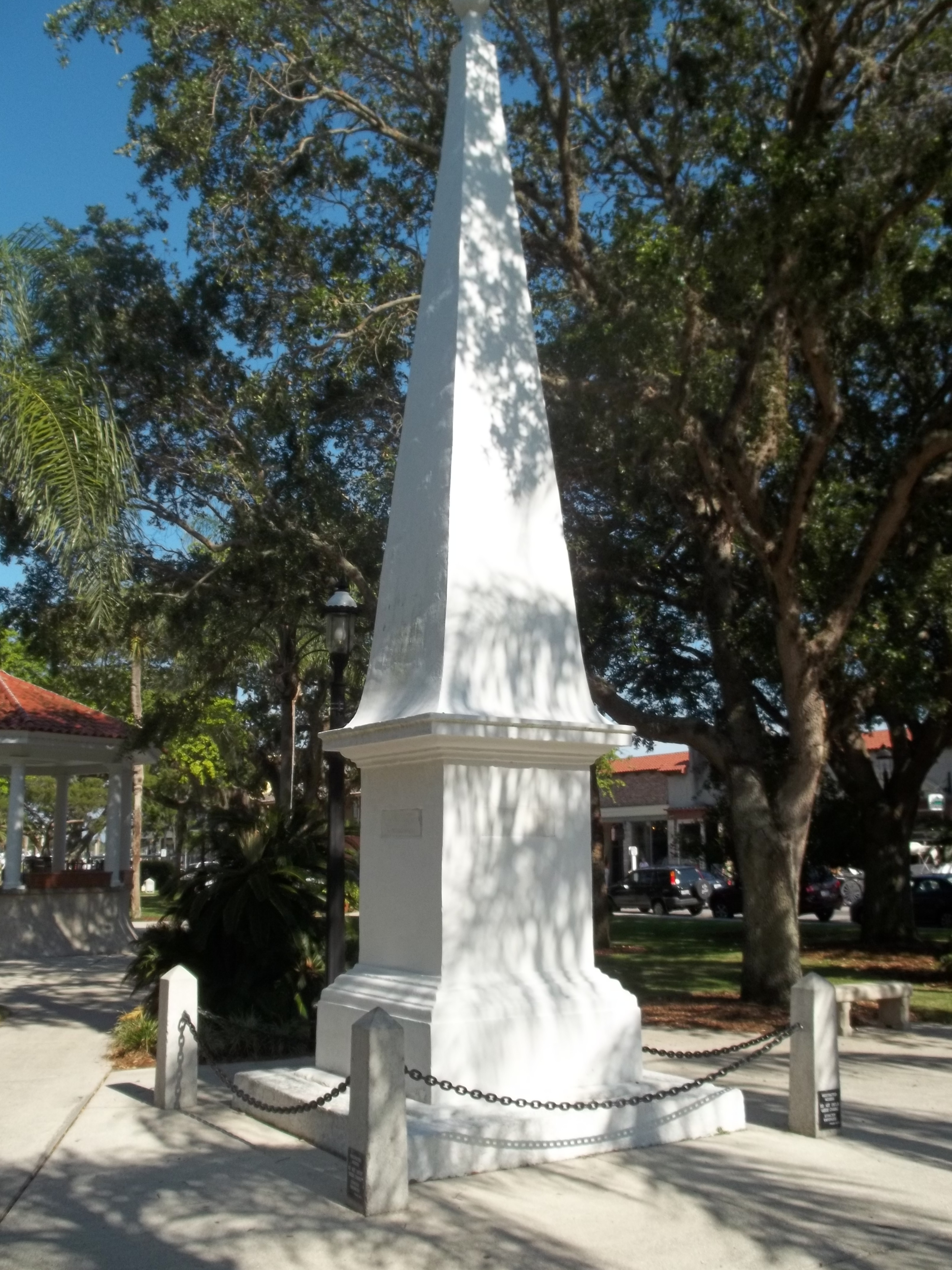
Constitution of 1812 monument

The Treaty of Paris in 1783 gave the American colonies north of Florida their independence, and ceded Florida to Spain in recognition of Spanish efforts on behalf of the American colonies during the war.

On September 3, 1783, by Treaty of Paris, Britain also signed separate agreements with France and Spain. In the treaty with Spain, the colonies of West Florida, captured by the Spanish, and East Florida were given to Spain, as was the island of Minorca, while the Bahama Islands, Grenada and Montserrat, captured by the French and Spanish, were returned to Britain.

Florida was under Spanish control again from 1784 to 1821. There was no new settlement, only small detachments of soldiers, as the fortifications decayed. Spain itself was the scene of war between 1808 and 1814 and had little control over Florida. In 1821 the Adams–Onís Treaty peaceably turned the Spanish provinces in Florida and, with them, St. Augustine, over to the United States. There were only three Spanish soldiers stationed there in 1821.

A relic of this second period of Spanish rule is the Constitution monument, an obelisk in the town plaza honoring the Spanish Constitution of 1812, one of the most liberal of its time. In 1814 King Ferdinand VII of Spain abolished that constitution and had monuments to it torn down; the one in St. Augustine is said to be the only one to survive.

== American period ==
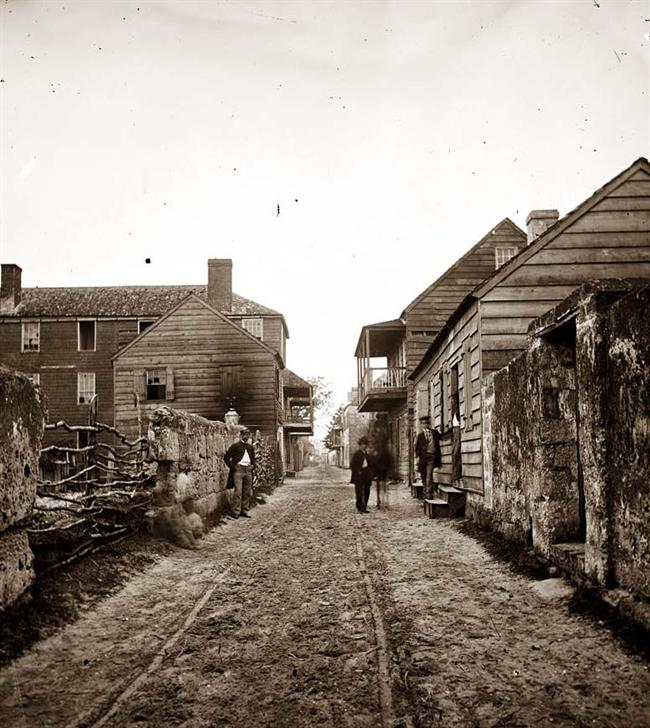
St. Augustine, c. 1861–65

Spain ceded Florida to the United States in the 1819 Adams–Onís Treaty, ratified in 1821; Florida officially became a U.S. possession as the Florida Territory in 1822. Andrew Jackson, a future president, was appointed its military governor and then succeeded by William Pope Duval, who was appointed territorial governor in April 1822. Florida gained statehood in 1845.

After 1821, the United States renamed the Castillo de San Marcos (called Castle St. Marks or Fort St. Mark by the British) "Fort Marion" in honor of Francis Marion, known as the "Swamp Fox" of the American Revolution.

During the Second Seminole War of 1835–42, the fort served as a prison for Seminole captives, including the famed leader Osceola, as well as John Cavallo (John Horse) the black Seminole and Coacoochee (Wildcat), who made a daring escape from the fort with 19 other Seminoles. The city produced at least two militia units who fought during the war including one called the St. Augustine Guards. A contemporary observer said that the units were poorly equipped and a "melancholy sight." However, another witness said of the St. Augustine Guards specifically that they were "the generous and spirited young men of St. Augustine."

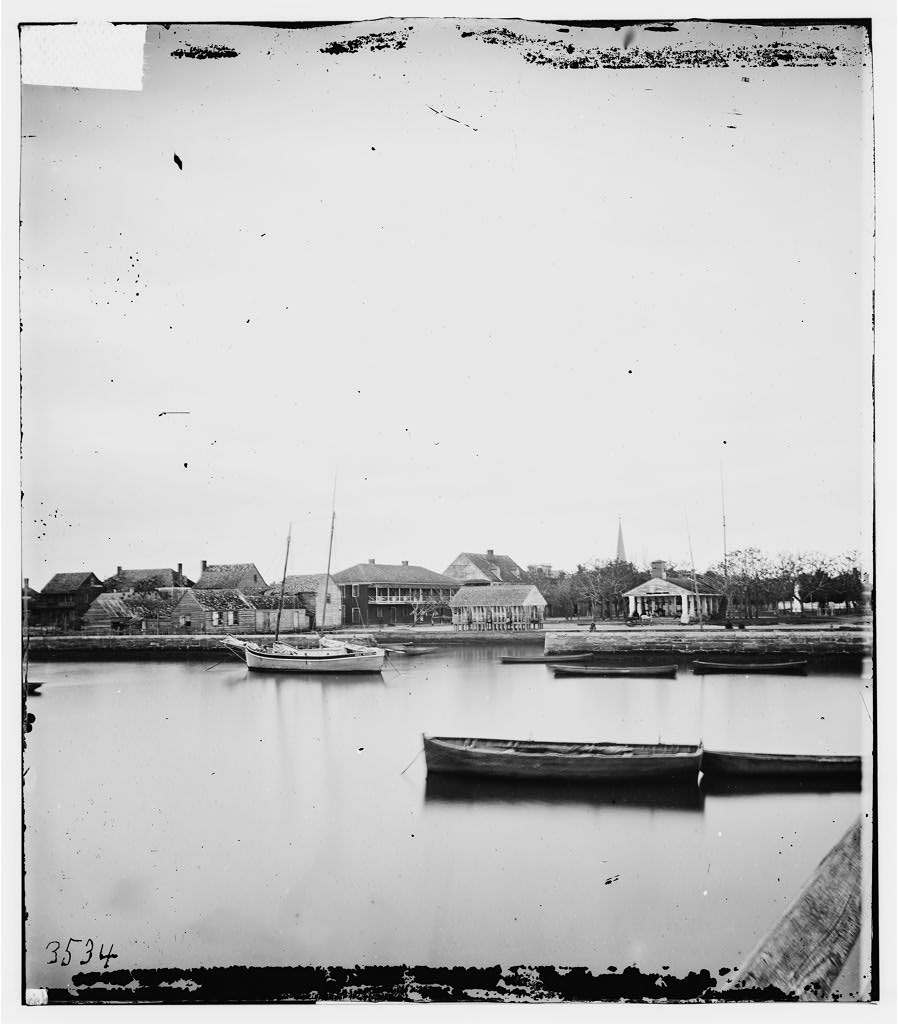
St. Augustine waterfront, Slave Market and Town Plaza, 1860s

In 1861, the American Civil War began; Florida seceded from the Union and joined the Confederacy. On January 7, 1861, prior to Florida's formal secession, a local militia unit, the St. Augustine Blues, took possession of St. Augustine's military facilities, including Fort Marion and the St. Francis Barracks, from the lone Union ordnance sergeant on duty. On March 11, 1862, crew from the USS Wabash reoccupied the city for the United States government without opposition. The fort was used as a site for recuperating Union soldiers and the Confederates never attempted to retake the city. However, Confederate cavalry did attack Union woodcutting parties who traveled too far from the city to gather fuel. In 1865, Florida rejoined the United States.

After the war, freedmen in St. Augustine established the community of Lincolnville in 1866, named after President Abraham Lincoln. Lincolnville, which had preserved the largest concentration of Victorian Era homes in St. Augustine, became a key setting for the Civil Rights Movement in St. Augustine a century later.

After the Civil War, Fort Marion was used twice, in the 1870s and then again in the 1880s, to confine first Plains Indians, and then Apaches, who were captured by the US Army in the West. The daughter of Geronimo was born at Fort Marion, and was named Marion. She later changed her name. The fort was also used as a military prison during the Spanish–American War of 1898. It was removed from the Army's active duty rolls in 1900 after 205 years of service under five different flags. Having been run temporarily by the St. Augustine Historical Society and Institute of Science in the 1910s, the National Park Service became its custodian and conservator in 1933. In 1942, Fort Marion reverted to its original name of Castillo de San Marcos. It is now run by the National Park Service, and is preserved as the Castillo de San Marcos National Monument, a National Historic Landmark.

== Flagler era ==
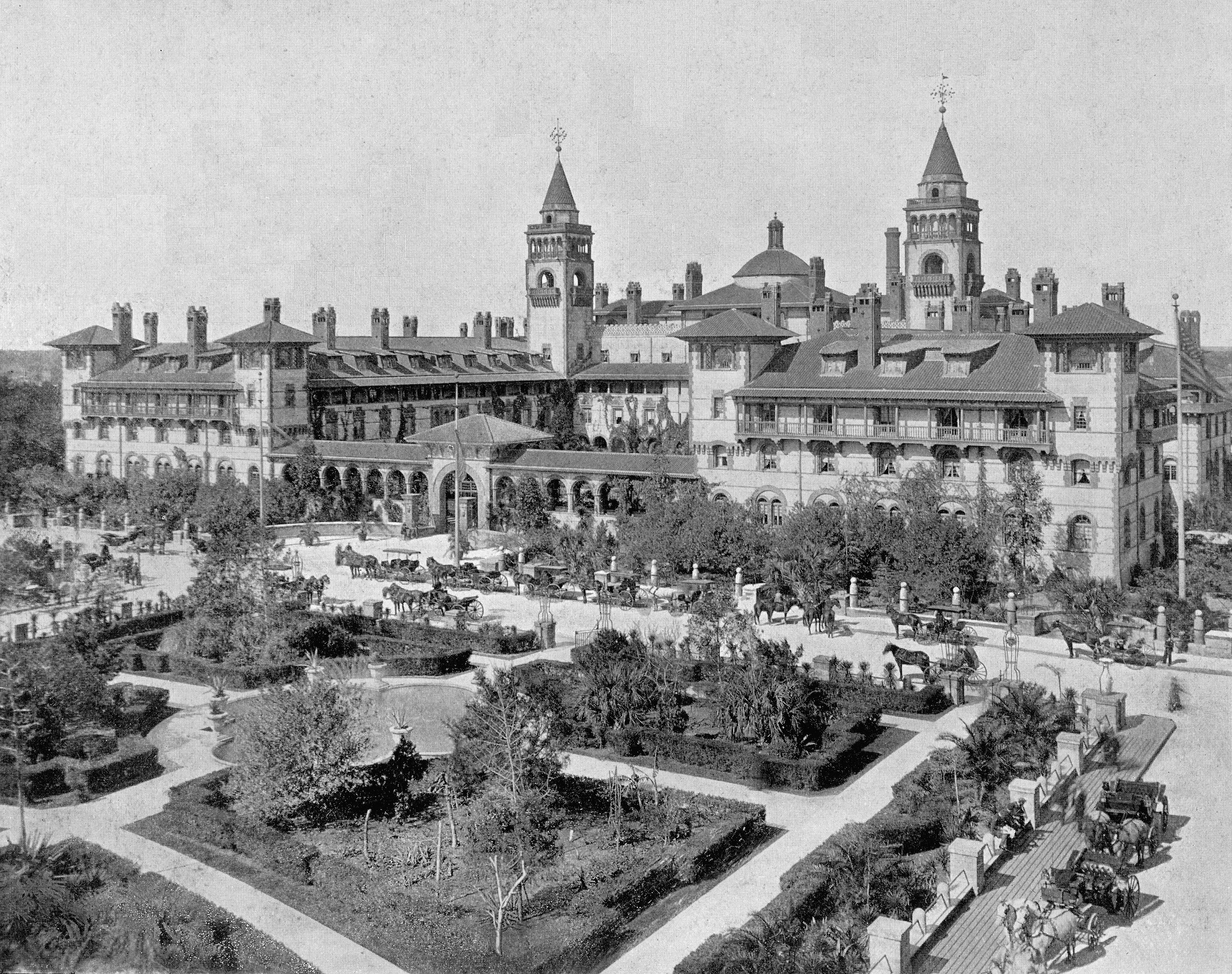
The Ponce de León Hotel in St. Augustine, about 1901

Henry Flagler, a partner with John D. Rockefeller in Standard Oil, arrived in St. Augustine in the 1880s. He was the driving force behind turning the city into a winter resort for the wealthy northern elite. Flagler bought a number of local railroads and incorporated them into the Florida East Coast Railway, which built its headquarters in St. Augustine.

Flagler commissioned the New York architectural firm of Carrère and Hastings to design a number of extravagant buildings in St. Augustine, among them the Ponce de León Hotel and the Alcazar Hotel. He built the latter partly on land purchased from his friend and associate Andrew Anderson and partly on the bed of Maria Sanchez Creek, which Flagler had filled with the archaeological remains of the original Fort Mose. Flagler, a Scottish Presbyterian, built or contributed to the construction of several churches of various denominations, including Grace Methodist, Ancient City Baptist, and the ornate Memorial Presbyterian Church of Venetian architectural style, where he was buried after his death in 1913.

Flagler commissioned Albert Spalding to design a baseball park in St. Augustine, and in the 1880s, the waiters at his hotels, under the leadership of headwaiter Frank P. Thompson, formed one of America's pioneer professional Negro league baseball teams, the Ponce de Leon Giants. Members of the New York African-American professional team, the Cuban Giants, wintered in St. Augustine, where they played for the Ponce de Leon Giants. These included Frank Grant, who in 2006 was inducted into the Baseball Hall of Fame.

In the 1880s, no public hospital was operated between Daytona Beach and Jacksonville. On May 22, 1888, Flagler invited the most influential women of St. Augustine to a meeting where he offered them a hospital if the community would commit to operate and maintain the facility. The Alicia Hospital opened March 1, 1890, as a not-for-profit institution; it was renamed Flagler Hospital in his honor in 1905.

The St. Augustine Alligator Farm, founded in 1893, is one of the oldest commercial tourist attractions in Florida, as is the Fountain of Youth Archaeological Park, which has been a tourist attraction since around 1902. The city is the eastern terminus of the Old Spanish Trail, a promotional effort of the 1920s linking St. Augustine to San Diego, California, with 3,000 miles (4,800 km) of roadways.

From 1918 to 1968, St. Augustine was the home of the Florida Normal and Industrial Institute, serving African American students. In 1942 it changed its name to Florida Normal and Industrial Memorial College.

The Florida land boom of the 1920s left its mark on St. Augustine with the residential development (though not completion) of Davis Shores, a landfill project of the developer D.P. Davis on the marshy north end of Anastasia Island. It was promoted as "America's Foremost Watering Place", and could be reached from downtown St. Augustine by the Bridge of Lions, billed as "The Most Beautiful Bridge in Dixie".

During World War II, St. Augustine hotels were used as sites for training Coast Guardsmen, including the artist Jacob Lawrence and actor Buddy Ebsen. It was a popular place for R&R for soldiers from nearby Camp Blanding, including Andy Rooney and Sloan Wilson. Wilson later wrote the novel The Man in the Gray Flannel Suit, which became a classic of the 1950s.

== Civil rights movement ==
St. Augustine was among the pivotal sites of the civil rights movement in 1963–64.

Nearly a decade after the Supreme Court ruling in Brown v. Board of Education that segregation of schools was unconstitutional, African Americans were still trying to get the city to integrate the public schools. They were also trying to integrate public accommodations, such as lunch counters, and were met with arrests and Ku Klux Klan violence. The police arrested non-violent protesters for participating in peaceful picket lines, sit-ins, and marches. Homes of blacks were firebombed, black leaders were assaulted and threatened with death, and others were fired from their jobs.

In the spring of 1964, St. Augustine based Robert Hayling, president of the Florida Branch of Martin Luther King Jr.'s Southern Christian Leadership Conference (SCLC), asked King for assistance. From May until July 1964, they carried out marches, sit-ins, and other forms of peaceful protest in St. Augustine. Hundreds of black and white civil rights supporters were arrested, and the jails were filled to overflowing. At the request of Hayling and King, white civil rights supporters from the North, including students, clergy, and well-known public figures, came to St. Augustine and were arrested together with Southern activists.

The Ku Klux Klan responded with violent attacks that were widely reported in national and international media. Popular revulsion against the Klan violence in St. Augustine generated national sympathy for the black protesters and became a key factor in Congressional passage of the Civil Rights Act of 1964, leading eventually to passage of the Voting Rights Act of 1965, both of which were to provide federal enforcement of constitutional rights.

The black Florida Normal Industrial and Memorial College, whose students had participated in the protests, felt itself unwelcome in St. Augustine, and in 1968 moved to a new campus in Dade County. Today it is Florida Memorial University.

In 2010, at the invitation of Flagler College, Andrew Young premiered his movie, Crossing in St. Augustine, about the 1963–64 struggles against Jim Crow segregation in the city. Young had marched in St. Augustine, where he was physically assaulted by hooded members of the Ku Klux Klan in 1964, and later served as US ambassador to the United Nations.

The city has a privately funded Freedom Trail of historic sites of the civil rights movement, and a museum at the Fort Mose site, the location of the 1738 free black community. Historic Excelsior School, built in 1925 as the first public high school for blacks in St. Augustine, has been adapted as the city's first museum of African-American history. In 2011, the St. Augustine Foot Soldiers Monument, a commemoration of participants in the civil rights movement, was dedicated in the downtown plaza a few feet from the former Slave Market. Robert Hayling, the leader of the St. Augustine movement, and Hank Thomas, who grew up in St. Augustine and was one of the original Freedom Riders, spoke at the dedication ceremony. Another corner of the plaza was designated "Andrew Young Crossing" in honor of the civil rights leader, who received his first beating in the movement in St. Augustine in 1964. Bronze replicas of Young's footsteps have been incorporated into the sidewalk that runs diagonally through the plaza, along with quotes expressing the importance of St. Augustine to the civil rights movement. That project was publicly funded. Some important landmarks of the civil rights movement, including the Monson Motel and the Ponce de Leon Motor Lodge, had been demolished in 2003 and 2004.

== Modern era ==
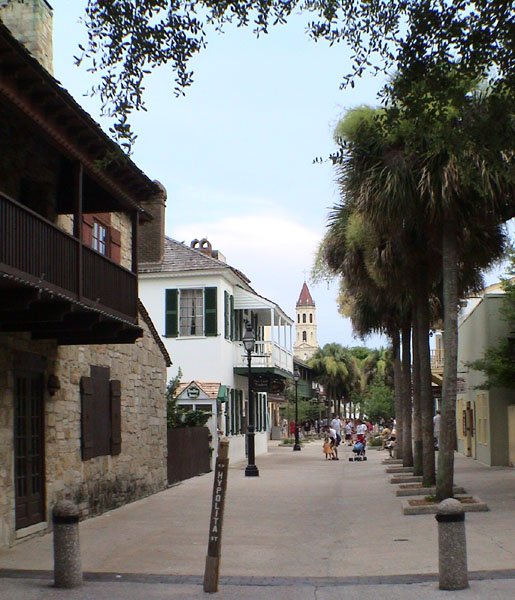
St. George Street

Today the city of St. Augustine is a popular travel destination. The city is a well-preserved example of Spanish-style buildings and 18th- and 19th-century architecture. St. Augustine is a very walkable city, with several oceanfront parks. The mild subtropical climate allows for a 12-month tourist season, and many tours operators are based in St. Augustine, offering walking and trolley tours.

== Architecture and points of interest ==
The city's historic center is anchored by St. George Street, which is lined with historic houses from various periods. Some of these houses are reconstructions of buildings or parts of buildings that had been burned or demolished over the years; however, several of them are original structures that have been restored. The city has many well-cared-for and preserved examples of Spanish-style, Mediterranean Revival, British Colonial, and early American homes and buildings. From 1959 to 1997, state agency Historic St. Augustine Preservation Board led the restoration and reconstruction efforts of St. Augustine's historic district and operated a living history museum called San Agustín Antiguo, parts of which remain today within the Colonial Quarter Museum.

The Castillo de San Marcos, located on South Castillo Drive, is the oldest masonry fort in the continental United States. Made of a limestone called coquina (Spanish for "small shells"), construction began in 1672. In The fort was declared a National Monument in 1924, and after 251 years of continuous military possession, was deactivated in 1933. The 20.48-acre (8.29 ha) site was then turned over to the United States National Park Service. Today the nearly 350-year-old fort is a popular photo spot for travelers and history buffs.

One of St. Augustine's most notable buildings is the former Ponce de Leon Hotel, now part of Flagler College. Built by millionaire developer and Standard Oil co-founder Henry M. Flagler and completed in 1888, the exclusive hotel was designed in the Spanish Renaissance style for vacationing northerners in winter who traveled south on the Florida East Coast Railway in the late 1800s.

The city also has one of the oldest alligator farms in the United States, opened on May 20, 1893. Today the St. Augustine Alligator Farm Zoological Park is at the center of alligator and crocodile education and environmental awareness in the United States. As of 2012, this was the only place where one can see every species of alligator, crocodile, caiman, and gharial in the United States.

Five statues depicting persons of historical significance to St. Augustine and located out of doors, are connected and featured on a system of signage that makes them accessible to the blind and the sighted called the TOUCH (Tactile Orientation for Understanding Creativity and History) St. Augustine Braille Trail. The statues are of Pedro Menéndez, the founder of St, Augustine; Juan Ponce de León, the first European known to explore the Florida peninsula; the St. Augustine Foot Soldiers, who made civil rights history in the city during the early 1960s; Henry Flagler, who built the Ponce de Leon Hotel, now Flagler College; and Father Pedro Camps and the Menorcans next to the Cathedral Basilica. The system includes an audio tour that may be accessed via phones without internet access as well as desktop computers and smart mobile devices.

== See also ==
- Spanish Florida

== Bibliography ==
- Abbad y Lasierra, Iñigo (2003). Relación de La Florida (in Spanish). Madrid: Iberoamericana Vervuert. ISBN 9788484890591.
- Colburn, David (1991). Racial Change and Community Crisis: St. Augustine, Florida, 1877–1980. Gainesville, FL: University Press of Florida. ISBN 978-0813010663.
- Corbett, Theodore G. (1974). "Migration to a Spanish Imperial Frontier in the Seventeenth and Eighteenth Centuries: St. Augustine". Hispanic American Historical Review. 54 (3): 414−430. doi:10.2307/2512931. JSTOR 2512931.
- Deagan, Kathleen (1995). Fort Mose: Colonial America's Black Fortress of Freedom. Gainesville: University Press of Florida. ISBN 978-0813013527.
- Fairbanks, George R. (1881). History and Antiquities of St. Augustine, Florida. Jacksonville, Florida: H. Drew.
- Gannon, Michael V. (1965). The Cross in the Sand: The Early Catholic Church in Florida 1513–1870. Gainesville: University Presses of Florida.
- Goldstein, Holly Markovitz, "St. Augustine's "Slave Market": A Visual History," Southern Spaces, 28 September 2012.
- Graham, Thomas (1978). The Awakening of St. Augustine: The Anderson Family and the Oldest City, 1821–1924. St. Augustine: St. Augustine Historical Society.
- Hanna, A. J. (1946). A Prince in Their Midst. Norman: University of Oklahoma Press.
- Harvey, Karen (1992). America's First City: St. Augustine's Historic Neighborhoods. Lake Buena Vista, Florida: Tailored Tours Publications. ISBN 978-0963124128.
- Harvey, Karen (2010). St. Augustine Enters the Twenty-first Century. Virginia Beach, VA: The Donning Company. ISBN 978-1578646159.
- Landers, Jane (1999). Black Society in Spanish Florida. Urbana, Illinois: University of Illinois Press. ISBN 978-0252067532.
- Lardner, Ring, Gullible's Travels, (1925), New York: Scribner's.
- Lyon, Eugene (1983). The Enterprise of Florida: Pedro Menendez de Aviles and the Spanish Conquest of 1565-1568. Gainesville: University Press of Florida. ISBN 978-0813007779.
- Manucy, Albert, Menendez, (1983), St. Augustine Historical Society.
- Marley, David F. (2005), "United States: St. Augustine", Historic Cities of the Americas, vol. 2, Santa Barbara, California: ABC-CLIO, p. 627+, ISBN 1-57607-027-1
- McCarthy, Kevin (editor), The Book Lover's Guide to Florida, (1992), Sarasota, Florida: Pineapple Press.
- Nolan, David, Fifty Feet in Paradise: The Booming of Florida, (1984), New York: Harcourt Brace Jovanovich.
- Nolan, David, The Houses of St. Augustine, (1995), Sarasota, Florida: Pineapple Press.
- Porter, Kenneth W., The Black Seminoles: History of a Freedom-Seeking People, (1996), Gainesville: University Press of Florida.
- "City and History of St. Augustine", Rand, McNally & Co.'s Handy Guide to the Southeastern States, Chicago: Rand, McNally & Co., 1899 – via Internet Archive
- Reynolds, Charles B. (Charles Bingham), Old Saint Augustine, a story of three centuries, (1893), St. Augustine, Florida E. H. Reynolds.
- Richardson, F.H. (1905). "St. Augustine, Fla.". Richardson's Southern Guide. Chicago: Monarch Book Company – via Internet Archive.
- Torchia, Robert W., Lost Colony: The Artists of St. Augustine, 1930–1950, (2001), St. Augustine: The Lightner Museum.
- Turner, Glennette Tilley, Fort Mose, (2010), New York: Abrams Books.
- United States Commission on Civil Rights, 1965. Law Enforcement: A Report on Equal Protection in the South. Washington, D.C.: Government Printing Office.
- Warren, Dan R., If It Takes All Summer: Martin Luther King, the KKK, and States' Rights in St. Augustine, 1964, (2008), Tuscaloosa: University of Alabama Press.
- Waterbury, Jean Parker (editor), The Oldest City, (1983), St. Augustine Historical Society.
