= Excelsior High School =

Excelsior High School may refer to:

- Excelsior High School (Norwalk, California)
- Excelsior High School (Jamaica), Kingston, Jamaica
- Excelsior School in the Lincolnville section of St. Augustine, Florida
