= Richard Twine =

Richard Twine may refer to:

- Richard Twine (photographer), American photographer
- Richard Twine (sociologist), British sociologist
