= Audrey Nell Edwards =

Audrey Nell Edwards is an African-American civil rights activist, best known for her participation in the St. Augustine movement in 1963.

== Early life ==
Audrey Nell Edwards grew up in St. Augustine, Florida.

== Activism ==
=== St. Augustine Four ===
On July 18, 1963, a group of seven teenagers — including the group of four teens who would later be known as the St. Augustine Four: Edwards, 16, JoeAnn Anderson, 15, Willie Carl Singleton, 16, and Samuel White, 14, entered a Woolworth's store in St. Augustine, Florida. The teens were members of the NAACP Youth Council and had been engaging in sit-ins at downtown St. Augustine lunch counters, advised by Dr. Robert Hayling.

At Woolworth's, the seven teens were arrested for attempting to order hamburgers at the segregated lunch counter. Judge Charles Mathis offered release to the teens if their parents were willing to sign documentation stating that the teens would refrain from protests until their respective 21st birthdays. If the documents were not signed, then the teens would remain incarcerated and would then be sent to reform school. Three of those arrested agreed to these terms and were released. The four teens — Edwards, Anderson, Singleton, and White — urged their parents not to sign the documents, and were kept in jail with adults, as no juvenile facilities were available.

Earl Johnson, a lawyer for the NAACP, attempted to secure their release, but a local judge moved the activists to reform schools. Singleton and White were sent to the infamous Florida School for Boys in Marianna, Florida; Edwards and Anderson were sent to the Florida School for Girls in Ocala, Florida. At the reform schools, the physical work was the norm. Finally, in response to national protests, Florida governor Cecil Farris Bryant and his cabinet issued a special action for the teenagers' release January 14, 1964.

The case of the St. Augustine Four caught the attention of other civil rights organizers across the country, including Martin Luther King Jr. When Dr. King visited St. Augustine, Edward met with the Civil Rights giant and joined him at the Monson Motor Lodge on June 11. Both King and Edwards were arrested; Edwards was charged with "breach of peace, trespassing with malicious intent, and conspiracy."

Shortly after this experience, Edwards met Jackie Robinson, who invited her and Anderson to his and his wife Rachel Robinson's home in Connecticut. The two teens spent three weeks with the Robinsons, visiting New York City sites and also the 1964 New York World's Fair.

Edwards long believed that the arrest record resulting from her activism barred her from employment in St. Augustine.

In 2004, Edwards attended a ceremony at St. Augustine's First Baptist Church in honor of the St. Augustine Four's contributions to the Civil Rights Movement.

Edwards is currently the last surviving member of the St. Augustine Four.

== Legacy ==
Edwards's house at 650 Julia Street in West Augustine, built for her in 2008 by Habitat for Humanity, is now a site on the ACCORD Freedom Trail.

St. Augustine Civil Rights activism, including lunch counter sit-ins, was fictionalized by author Judy Lindquist in the 2018 book Forcing Change, published by the Florida Historical Society Press. The story of the St. Augustine Four is also featured in the University Press of America book Unsung Heroes of the Civil Rights Movement and Thereafter, edited by Dorothy M. Singleton.
