= Solla-Carcaba Cigar Factory =

- U.S. National Register of Historic Places
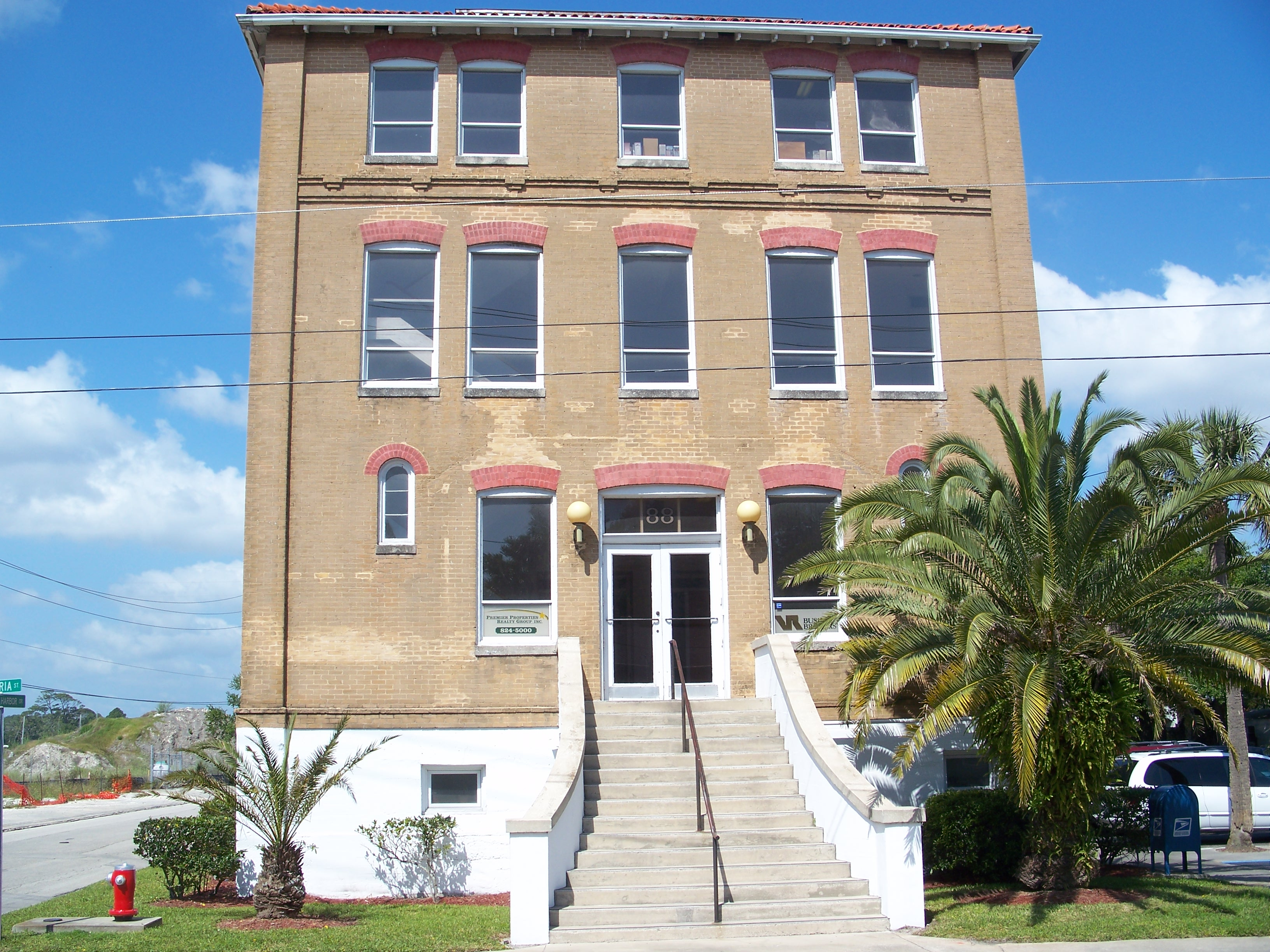
- Location: St. Augustine, Florida
- Coordinates: 29°53′27″N 81°19′8″W
- NRHP reference No.: 93000374
- Added to NRHP: May 6, 1993

The Solla-Carcaba Cigar Factory (also known as the Pamies-Arango Cigar Factory) is the last standing historic cigar factory in the Lincolnville Historic District. The building is located at 88 Riberia Street in St. Augustine, Florida and was added to the U.S. National Register of Historic Places on May 6, 1993. Current owners, Vista Hotels VIII, Inc., and their principal, Kanti Patel, are in the process of converting the building from its current use as professional office space to a Hilton-branded boutique hotel to be named, "The Factory."

== Gallery ==
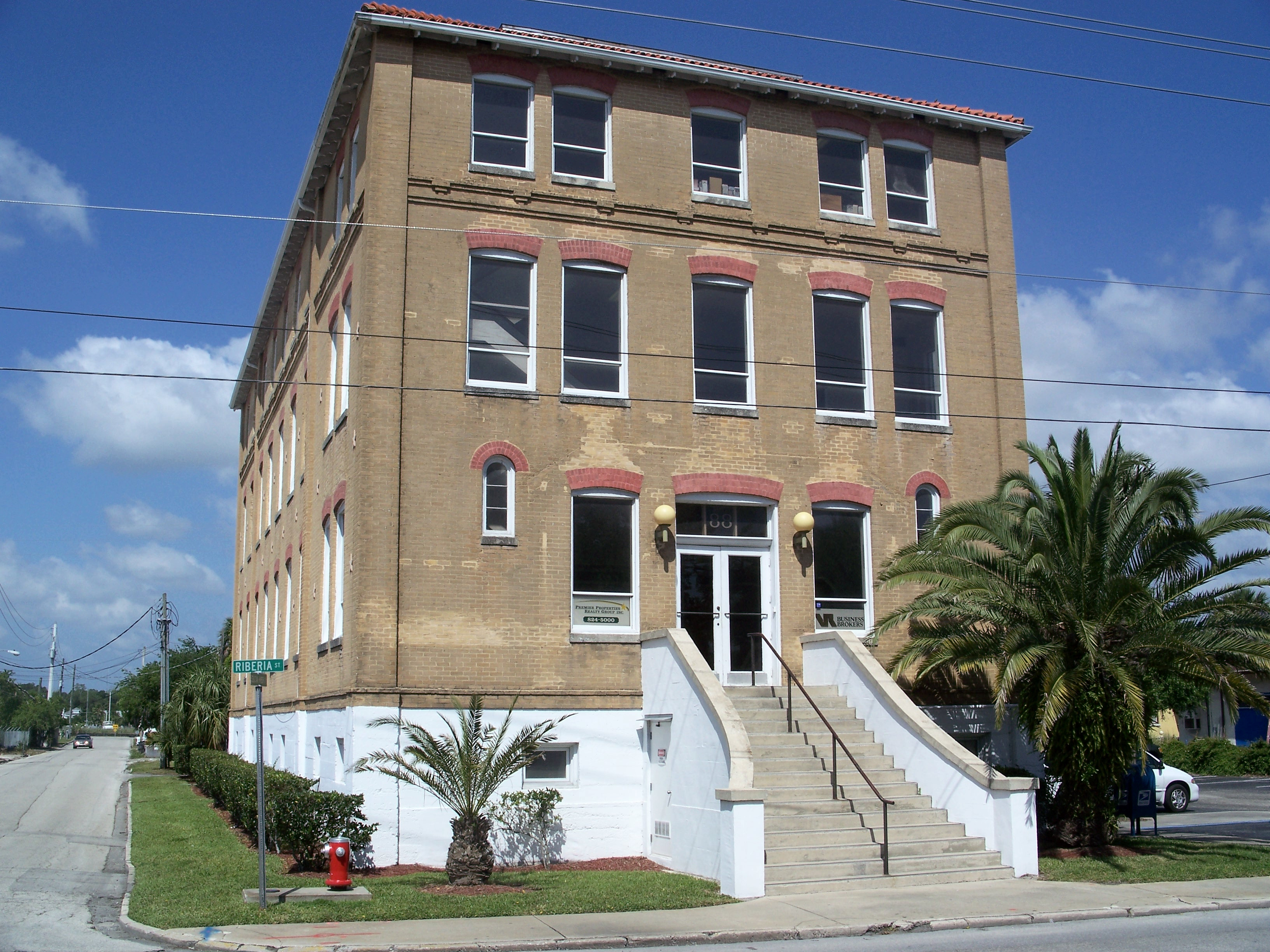

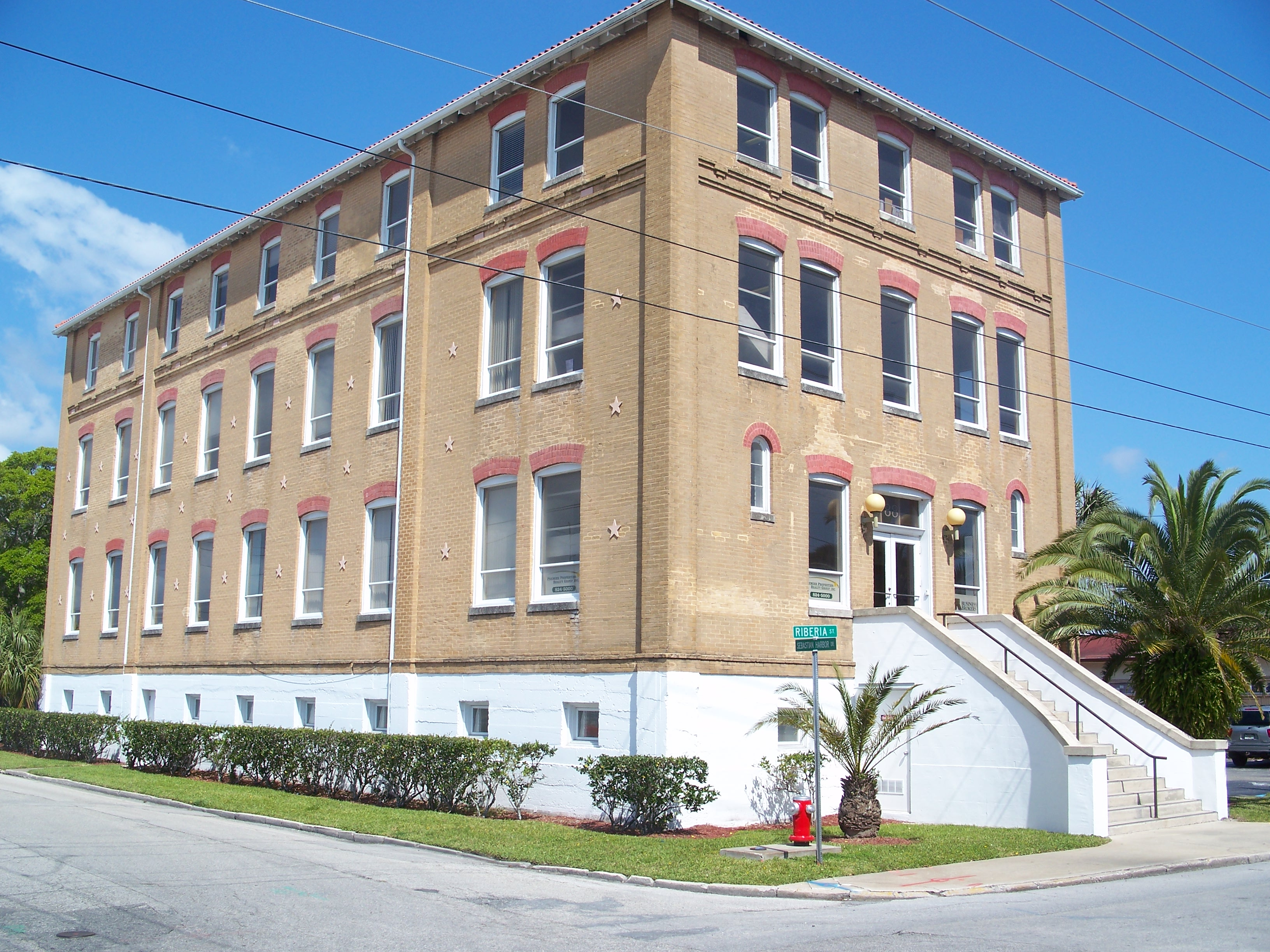

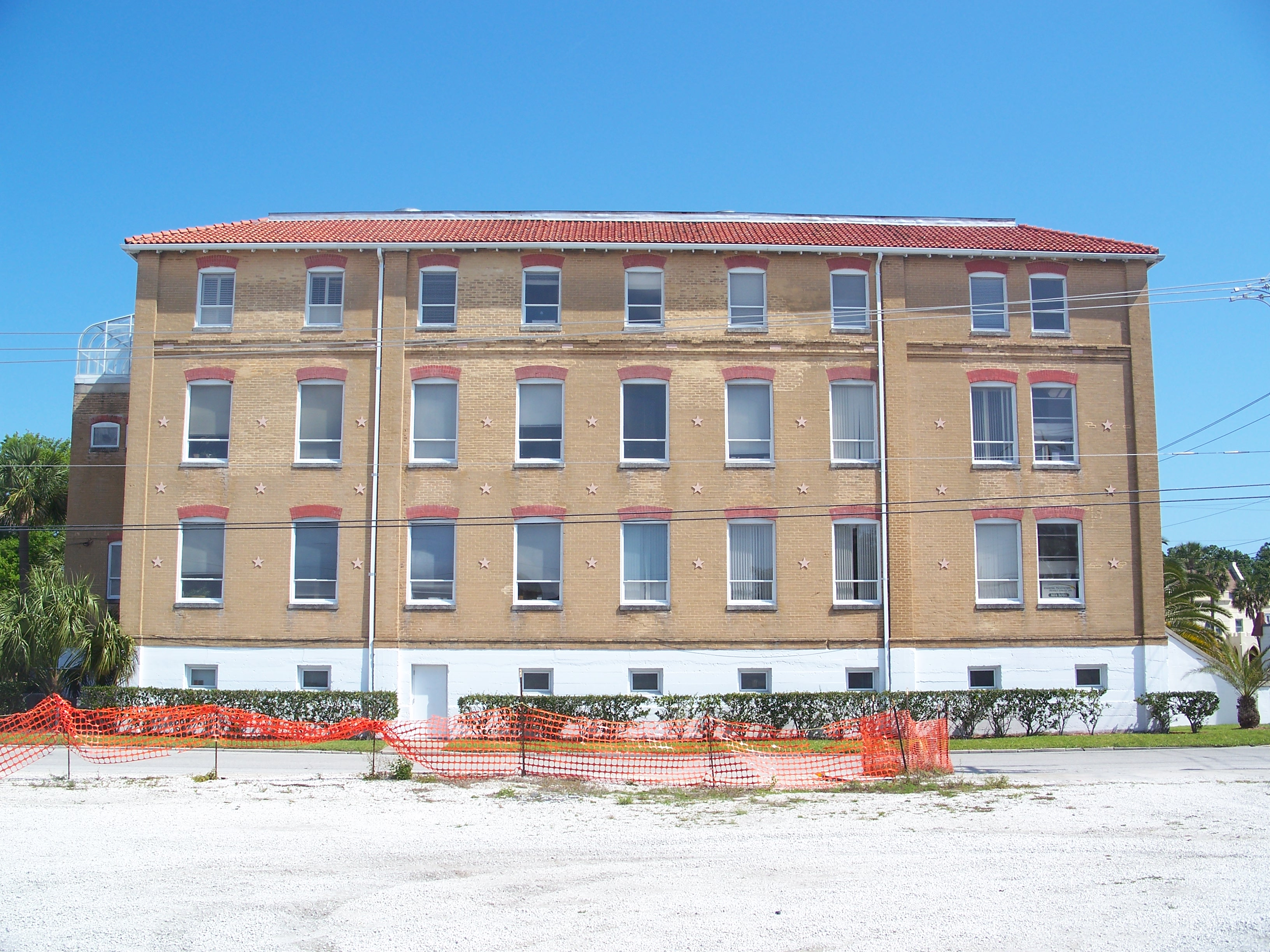
