= Richard Twine (photographer) =

American photographer (1896–1974)

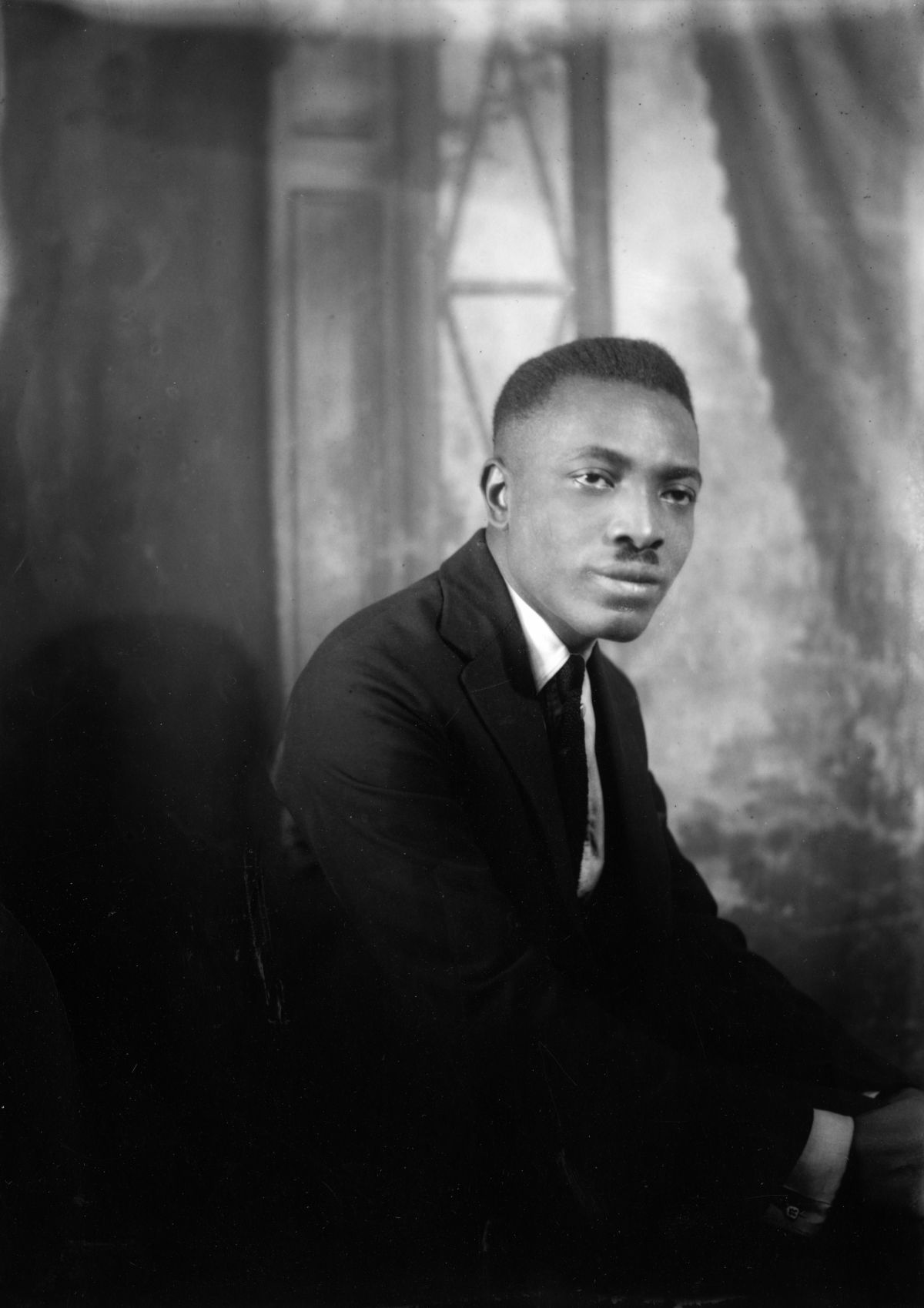
- Self-portrait, ca. 1922
- Born: Richard Aloysius Twine; May 11, 1896; St. Augustine, Florida, U.S.
- Died: September 27, 1974 (aged 78)
- Occupation: Photographer

Richard Aloysius Twine (May 11, 1896 – September 27, 1974) was a professional photographer in the Lincolnville section of St. Augustine, Florida (now the Lincolnville Historic District) in the 1920s.

Twine was born in St. Augustine to Harriet and David Twine; he was the youngest of eight children. It is thought that he learned his photography skills in New York City. In Lincolnville, he shot both street photography and at his studio, located at 62 Washington Street. In 1927, he moved to Miami and worked at a restaurant before establishing a hotel.

In 1988 a collection of glass plate negatives was found in boxes in the attic of a house under demolition that had been Twine’s home. The collection was acquired by the St. Augustine Historical Society.

He photographed residents of Lincolnville commemorating Emancipation Day at the annual parade in 1920. He photographed an Excelsior School teacher and students at Florida Normal and Industrial Institute. His work includes a self-portrait.

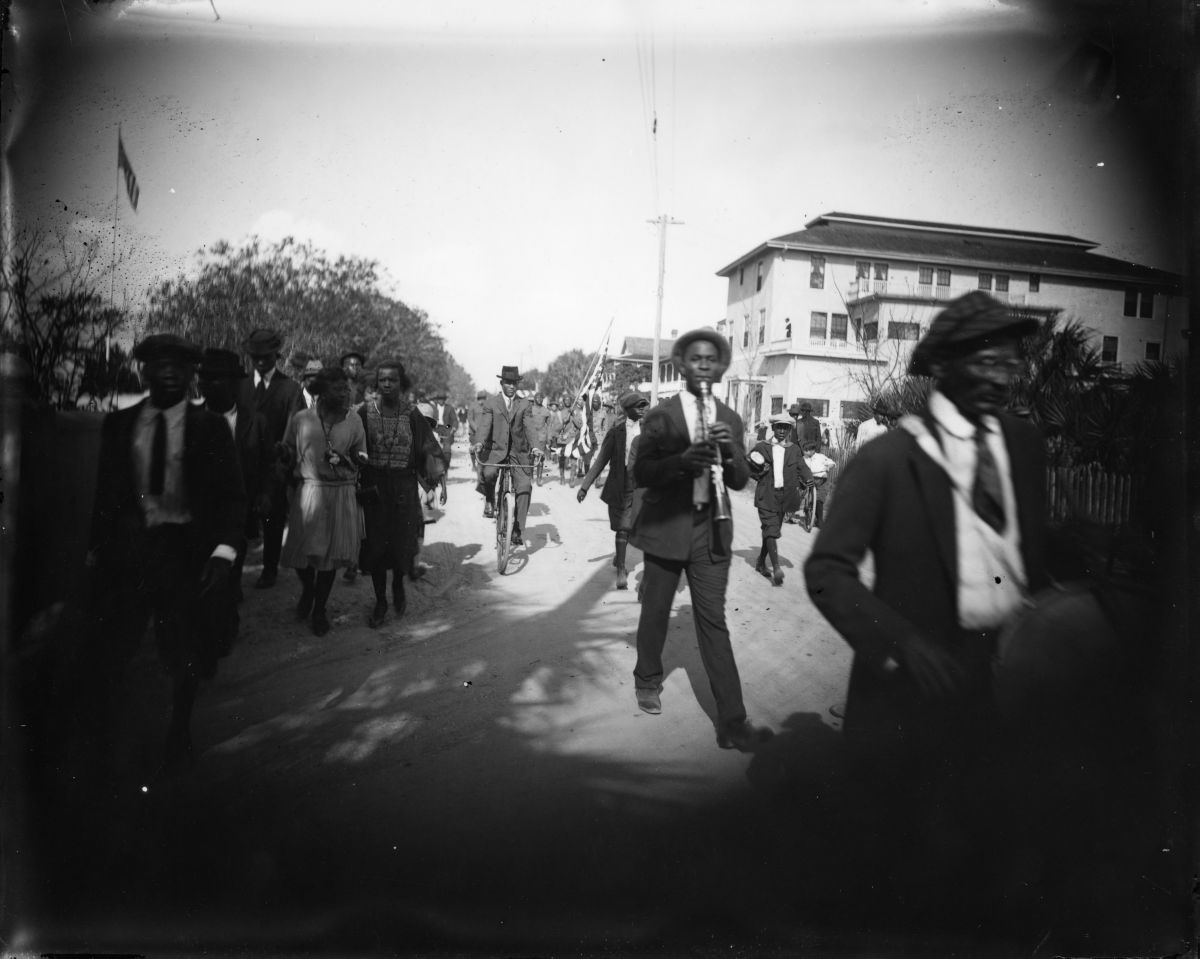
Emancipation Day parade in Lincolnville

The University of North Florida and Lincolnville Museum have been involved in documenting subjects in the photographs as they relate to Lincolnville’s history.

One of his relatives, Henry L. Twine (1923-1994) was a leader of the civil rights movement in St. Augustine that led directly to the passage of the landmark Civil Rights Act of 1964 and a moving force behind the acquisition of Fort Mose by the state of Florida. He was the longest-serving Black elected official in St. Augustine in the 20th century, and the first Black vice mayor of the Ancient City.

== See also ==
- Lincolnville Museum and Cultural Center
- James Van Der Zee, photographer based in Harlem
