= Hastings High School (Florida) =

- U.S. National Register of Historic Places
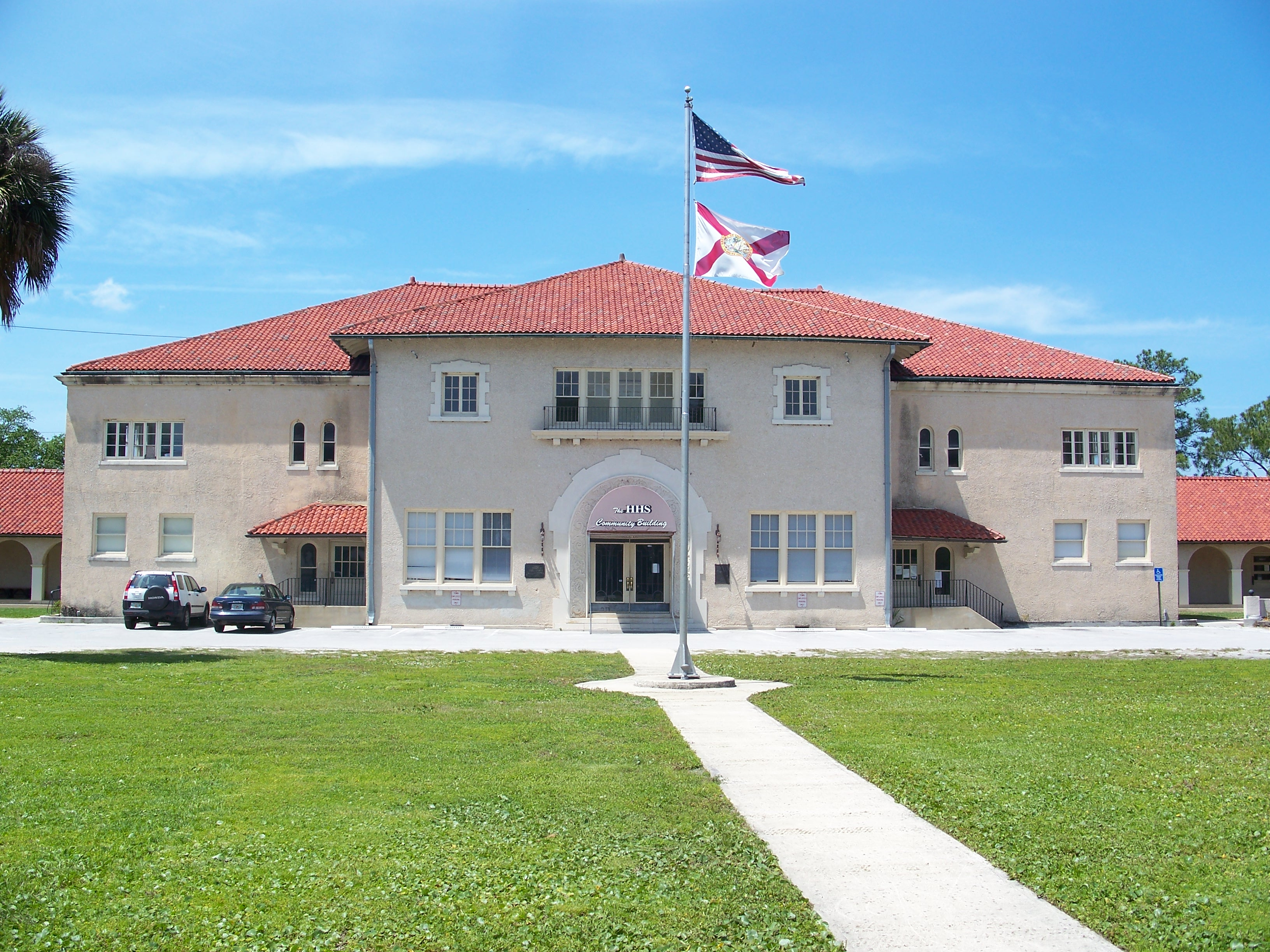

- Location within Florida Location within the United States
- Location: Hastings, Florida United States
- Coordinates: 29°42′42.07″N 81°30′32.13″W
- Built: 1924
- Architect: Fred A. Henderich
- NRHP reference No.: 06000502
- Added to NRHP: June 14, 2006

The Hastings High School is a historic public high school building in the St. Johns County School District. It is located at 6195 South Main Street in Hastings, Florida, in southwest St. Johns County, Florida. The building no longer operates as a school, and currently serves as a library.

== History ==
Construction of a new school, designed by Fred A. Henderich, began in May 1924. The two-story coquina building had a roof of Spanish tile and included 12 classrooms, laboratories, administrative offices, a cafeteria and an auditorium with seating for 650. Lighting was electric and heat was provided with hot water radiators.

The Hastings Branch of the St. Johns County Public Library is located in this building. The school closed in 1985. Part of the school property is being considered for use as a technical school in 2026.

On June 14, 2006, it was added to the U.S. National Register of Historic Places.

== Notable alumni ==
- Derrick Ramsey (born 1956), Kentucky Secretary of Education and Workforce Development and former NFL player who played tight end for nine seasons for the Oakland/Los Angeles Raiders, New England Patriots and Detroit Lions.
