= Mimi Jones (activist) =

American civil rights activist (1947–2020)

Mimi Jones; born Mamie Nell Ford (May 4, 1947 – July 26, 2020) was an American civil rights activist who played a part in the St. Augustine movement during the 1960s. During the summer of 1964, she and other protesters staged a swim-in at a whites-only hotel swimming pool. The manager of the hotel, James Brock, poured muriatic acid into the water in an attempt to drive the protesters out of the pool. The subsequent photographs of Brock's actions were broadcast around the world and made the front pages of The New York Times, The Washington Post and many other newspaper publications.

The events in St. Augustine would play a huge role in the passing of the Civil Rights Act of 1964. Martin Luther King Jr., who was arrested during a sit-in for trying to eat a meal at that same hotel, in his memoir described St. Augustine as a "rock-bound bastion of segregation and discrimination."

== Biography ==
=== Early life and education ===
Jones was born in Oakfield, Georgia, and raised in Albany, Georgia. At the age of 15, Jones taught illiterate black men and women in Georgia how to read so that they could pass their poll literacy tests. At the age of just 17, Jones was one of the youngest protesters to put her body on the line in St. Augustine. Protests in St. Augustine were marked with violence and many protesters were met by white segregationists who violently attacked them. Many protesters were arrested and incarcerated. Jones was invited to St. Augustine by Hosea Williams, a close associate and friend of Dr. Martin Luther King Jr. She played a large role in the St. Augustine movement despite her young age due to the fact that she was one of the few civil rights activists that knew how to swim at the time. According to historian David Nolan, "practically none of the civil rights activists knew how to swim" and Jones had taught herself how to swim by practicing at a creek near her home.

Jones graduated from the University of Massachusetts at Boston with a bachelor's degree in political science.

=== 1964 Monson Motor Lodge protests ===
St. Augustine, one of the United States' oldest cities, was scheduled to celebrate its 400th anniversary. Due to the additional press and media coverage of the 400th anniversary of the city, Dr. King and leaders from the NAACP and Southern Christian Leadership Conference believed that St. Augustine would be an ideal place to rally national support for the passage of the Civil Rights Act of 1964.

On June 18, 1964, a group of protesters including Jones jumped into the whites-only pool at the Monson Motor Lodge. The manager James Brock poured muriatic acid in an attempt to separate the integrationists and get them to leave the pool. The moment was captured by photographer Horace Cort and would lead to a series of popular photos taken during the St. Augustine movement. Jones recalled that she couldn't breathe in the aftermath of Brock's actions and that she had no idea of how impactful the swim-in would be. The photos were broadcast all over the globe and they would eventually capture the attention of the White House and then-President Lyndon B. Johnson. Johnson would sign the Civil Rights Act of 1964 into law on July 2, 1964, less than a month after the protests.
