= St. Benedict the Moor School =

- U.S. Historic district – Contributing property
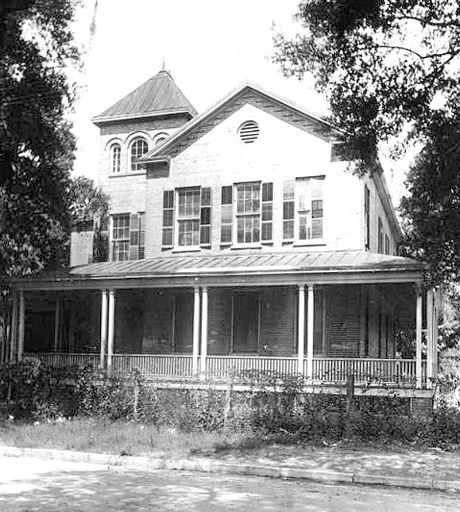

- Location within Florida Location within the United States
- Location: 86 Martin Luther King Avenue; St Augustine, Florida
- Coordinates: 29°53′12″N 81°18′54″W
- Built: 1898
- Built by: St Katharine Drexel
- Part of: Lincolnville Historic District (ID91000979)
- Designated CP: November 29, 1991

St. Benedict the Moor School is a former Black Catholic primary school located in the Lincolnville Historic District of St. Augustine, Florida. The school is a contributing property of the Lincolnville Historic District on the National Register of Historic Places.

== History ==
The school began as part of a Catholic mission in 1871 to serve and minister to newly freed slaves. It is located at 86 Martin Luther King Avenue and was built in 1898.

The money for construction of the school ($7,500) was donated by Katherine Drexel (1858–1955), founder and superior of the Sisters of the Blessed Sacrament, an order of nuns formed "to serve Indians and Colored People." Drexel, a member of the wealthy Philadelphia banking family, was the niece of Anthony J. Drexel, founder of Drexel University. (Katharine was made a saint by Pope John Paul II in 2000.)

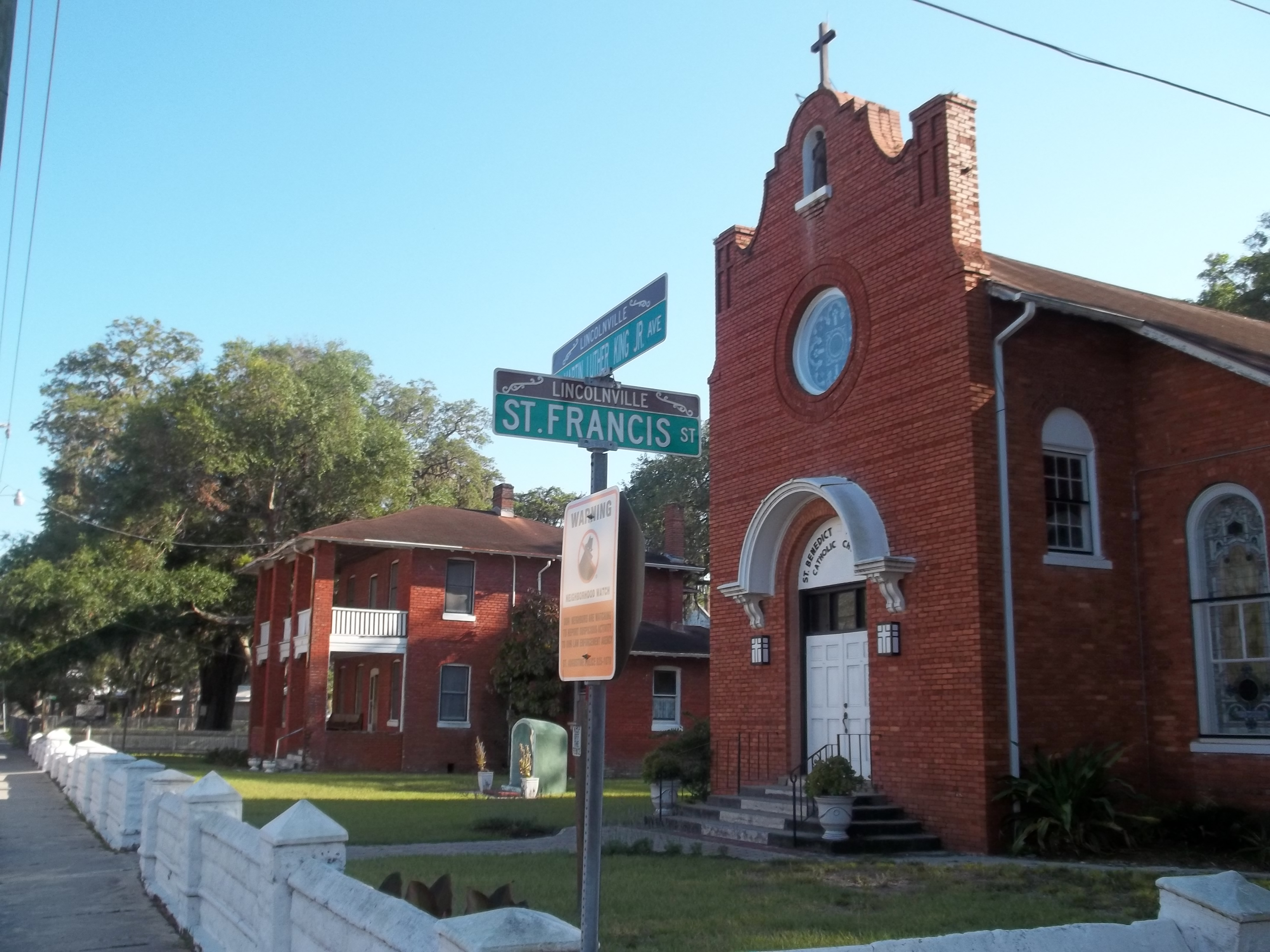
St. Benedict the Moor Catholic Church (right) and rectory.

The school, named in honor of St. Benedict the Moor, was constructed of brick and was one of the first schools for black students in Florida. The students were instructed by nuns of a local convent of the Sisters of St. Joseph. There were between 90 and 100 students enrolled per year at the school which was opened between 1898 and 1968. The school is located on a parcel of land which includes the school on the southern end of the property, the parish house in the center and the church of St. Benedict the Moor at the north end, staffed by the Josephites.

During 1964, Martin Luther King Jr. used the rectory as a meeting place to plan marches. The school was closed soon after, partly as a result of school desegregation legislation which arose in the wake of the Civil Rights Act of 1964. The events which occurred in St. Augustine, of which Martin Luther King Jr. played a key role, were an important catalyst in the passage of the Civil Rights Act.

Years prior to the Civil Rights Era, in 1916, three white Catholic nuns were arrested for violating a 1913 Florida law prohibiting white teachers for instructing blacks. The three were acquitted on the grounds that the law did not apply to private schools.

The school is a contributing property of the Lincolnville Historic District on the National Register of Historic Places. Despite this designation the building sits exposed to the elements with no roof or windows. The roof was removed during 2006 as part of a restoration project which has been stalled for an alleged lack of funding.
