= St. Augustine Foot Soldiers Monument =

Civil rights monument in Florida, U.S.

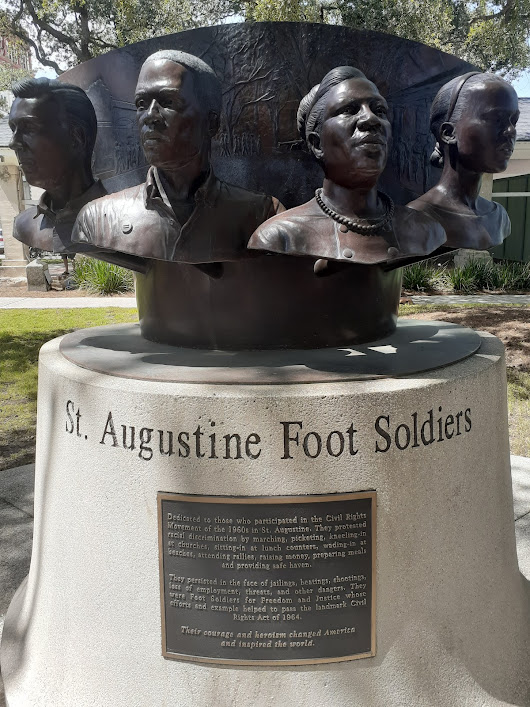
A monument to those who protested peacefully in the early 1960s to advance the civil rights cause in St. Augustine, Florida

St. Augustine Foot Soldiers Monument is located near the corner of King St. and Charlotte St. in the Southeast corner of the Plaza de la Constitución (known as "the Plaza"), a historic public park in downtown St. Augustine, Florida. It is in remembrance of the people who engaged in various forms of peaceful protest in St. Augustine in the early 1960s to advance the cause of civil rights, contributing to the passage of the Civil Rights Act of 1964. The monument, commissioned by the St. Augustine Foot Soldiers Remembrance Project, Inc. (the "Project"), was installed and unveiled in May 2011.

== Physical description ==
The 675 lb (310 kg) bronze monument – designed by sculptor Brian R. Owens of Deltona, Florida – features four life-size portraits of anonymous foot soldiers placed shoulder to shoulder, in front of a relief illustrating a protest in the same Plaza where the monument is now installed. The portraits represent an approximate demographic profile of the foot soldiers: A Caucasian college student, and three African Americans: A male in his thirties, a female in her sixties and a 16-year-old female. The 7,500 lb (3,400 kg) tapered cast-stone base – designed by Enzo Torcoletti of St. Augustine – includes Coquina, a naturally occurring material used in the construction of many historic structures in St. Augustine. A historic plaque is displayed on the front of the base and a donor-recognition plaque is on the back.

== History of the installation site ==
The Project – a non-profit tax-exempt organization separate from government – desired to install a monument in the Plaza, which is owned by the city. The location was considered ideal for a number of reasons: The Plaza – originally built on orders from the king of Spain in 1598 – features a number of historic items and structures, including a Confederate Monument and a "Slave Market". The Slave Market – an open, roofed structure that was once used as public market pavilion where local produce was regularly sold, including fish and locally raised meat. one slave was sold to settle an estate. It is located in the Northeast corner. it was named the Slave Market in order to promote it as a tourist attraction in the early 20th century on post cards. slaves were never actually sold there, but historian David Nolan discovered incontrovertible evidence in the form of multiple advertisements, deed books and City Council minutes proving that numbers of slaves were auctioned there. The evidence also proves that slaves were punished in the structure by public whipping in the 1840s. David Nolan concluded this research in the 1980s at the request of a City Commissioner. The Plaza is also a place where history was made. The first attempts to integrate food counters in St. Augustine were at a Woolworths that faced the Plaza. Later, Foot Soldiers made numerous "night marches" to the Plaza. St. Augustine is the oldest city in the US settled by Europeans, therefore it is almost certain that the Plaza is the oldest public park in the US that still functions as a public park. The Plaza is prominent, unique in appearance and natural beauty and crossed by large numbers of tourists. Protests were held at many places in St. Augustine, but the Woolworths and Monson Motor Lodge (the privately owned places most familiar to students of history) have moved out or no longer exist. The Plaza however, appears much as it did in the 1960s. In April 2009, the St. Augustine City Commissioners amended a City Code that precluded the placement of monuments in the Plaza celebrating historical events occurring after February 21, 1821, so that this monument could be installed, recognizing, as historian David Nolan put it, "the most important event in St. Augustine's modern history". The installation site is located near the Slave Market. The monument faces away from the Slave Market, towards King St. and the building where Woolworths was located.

== History of the project ==
Barbara H. Vickers, 88 years old (as of the unveiling), a native of St. Augustine and Foot Soldier who marched in the early 1960s, conceived the idea of creating a public art monument and began to organize the Project in 2005. She was motivated by a desire to recognize the protesters who were largely anonymous and unrecognized until now for the price they paid in the way of physical injuries, lost jobs and lost homes. Also, the Civil Rights Movement activities in St. Augustine are largely unknown, even to students of the American Civil Rights Movement. St. Augustine is only a footnote in many books on this subject, including what is arguably the most prominent historical overview in the form of a book and its companion television series: Eyes on the Prize. With the help of prominent, influential citizens – some of whom had experience as politicians and knew the workings of city government – Vickers and her associates established the St. Augustine Foot Soldiers Remembrance Project, Inc. (the Project), as a tax-exempt nonprofit organization. The Board of Directors included experts in history, fine art, communications and politics. The Project identified three qualified sculptors, with the intention of selecting a sculptor prior to substantive fund-raising.

The object was to complete a monument (a bronze sculpture and base), install it in the historic Plaza De La Constitucion and then give it to the city. This required thorough and formal communication with City officials at every stage of the process, including the selection of the sculptor, presentations showing the design and the release of technical details related to durability and safety.

After producing a concept drawing and a price estimate, Brian R. Owens was awarded the commission. The Project and Owens agreed to handle the commission in three stages: First, Owens would refine the concept drawing and produce illustrations to help support the Projects fund-raising efforts; then Owens would sculpt a full-sized clay model of the monument for the Project to approve; then Owens would proceed to complete the monument in bronze and deliver it to the Plaza for the Project to lift and install onto the base.

Owens would supply designs for the base, but the final decision on its design would be the responsibility of the Project. The Project would also fabricate and install the base. The City agreed to pay for construction needed to prepare the installation site to receive the monument. This would involve pouring new concrete in the area. Substantive fund-raising began in 2008. Over a period of about 24 months, over 220 individuals and 22 corporations donated the roughly $70,000 needed to cover all costs. In September 2009, Brian R. Owens and the project signed a contract in a public ceremony held on site less than 40 feet from the Slave Market and Owens commenced work before all of the funds were raised. As the monument neared completion, the City finished construction needed to prepare the site, including a circular concrete walkway, sidewalks, landscaping and coquina benches. The base and sculpture were installed on the same day, covered with a lockable canvas tarp, and then unveiled a few days later on May 14, 2011. By the end of May, title to the monument transferred from the Project to the City of St. Augustine.

== The unveiling ceremony ==
The monument was unveiled after a ceremony, attended by roughly 200 people, on Saturday, May 14, 2011, in the Plaza. The upbeat and lively ceremony was held in the Slave Market due to heavy rain. The program included a number of speakers and musical performers. Financial supporters had been recognized during a separate event held at Flagler College earlier that day. Speakers included Dr. Robert B. Hayling, a native of St. Augustine and one of the leaders of the movement there. . Hayling was a dentist with a practice, whose hands were deliberately broken by a segregationist mob that abducted him. The keynote speaker, Henry (Hank) Thomas, a native of St. Augustine, was one of the first to be arrested for attempting to be served at Woolworth's in 1961, two years before the Civil Rights Movement actions which commenced there in 1963. He then joined the movement in other states and is one of the few living Freedom Riders. Hank Thomas' speech included an account of how his system of beliefs and faith helped him survive extraordinary acts of mob violence and attempted murder. The rain stopped when it was time for the unveiling. The monument was unveiled by Barbara H. Vickers, members of the Project and government officials of the City of St. Augustine. Live music and finger-food was provided to the public without charge at a restaurant nearby.

== The audio tour ==
The monument is connected and featured on a system of signage that is accessible to the blind and the sighted called the TOUCH (Tactile Orientation for Understanding Creativity and History) St. Augustine Braille Trail. The system includes an audio tour that may be accessed via phones without internet access as well as desktop computers and smart mobile devices. Stop number seven of the audio tour includes a 5-minute audio recording that describes the civil rights movement in St. Augustine and insights into the monuments' design.

== Gallery ==
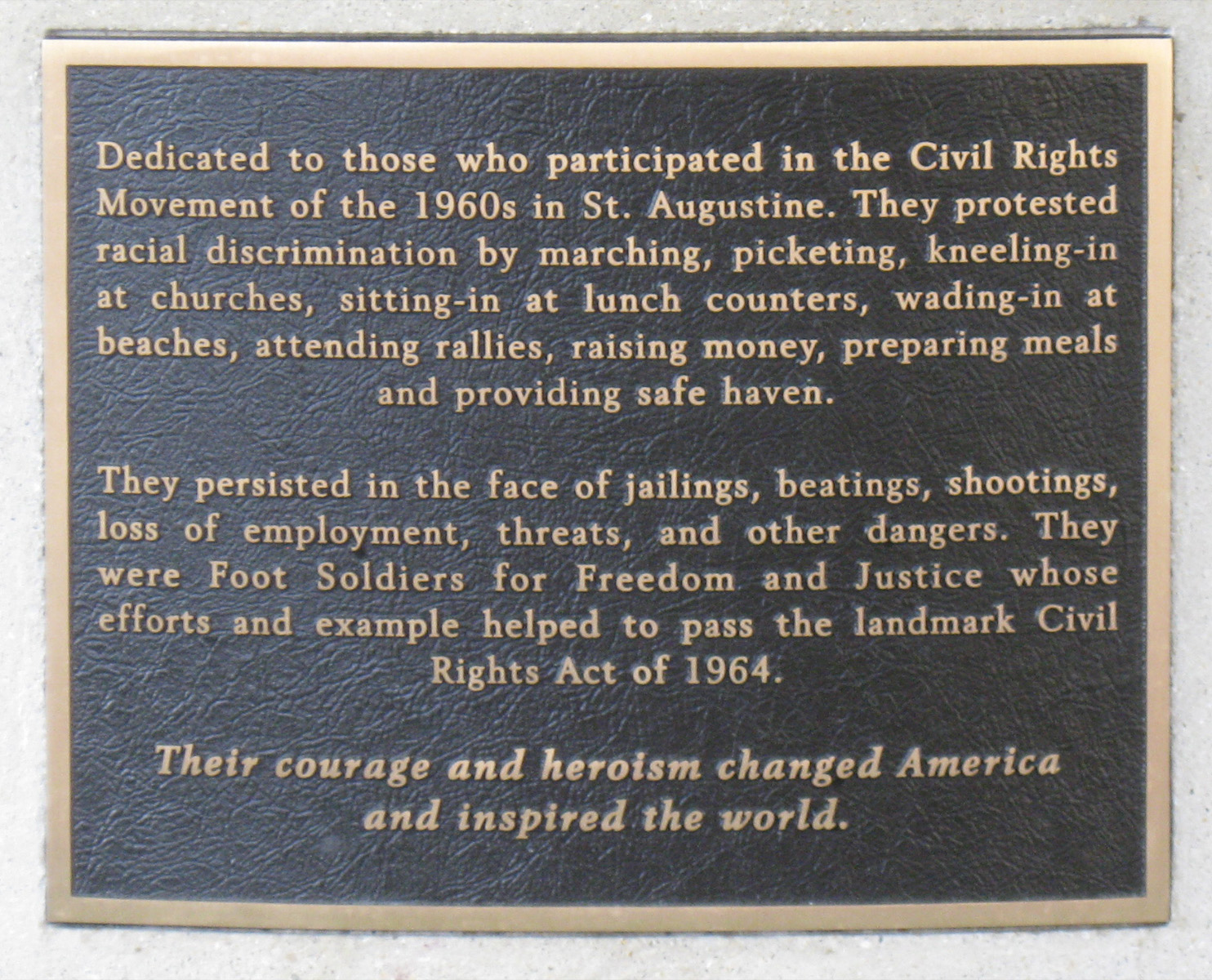
Historical plaque

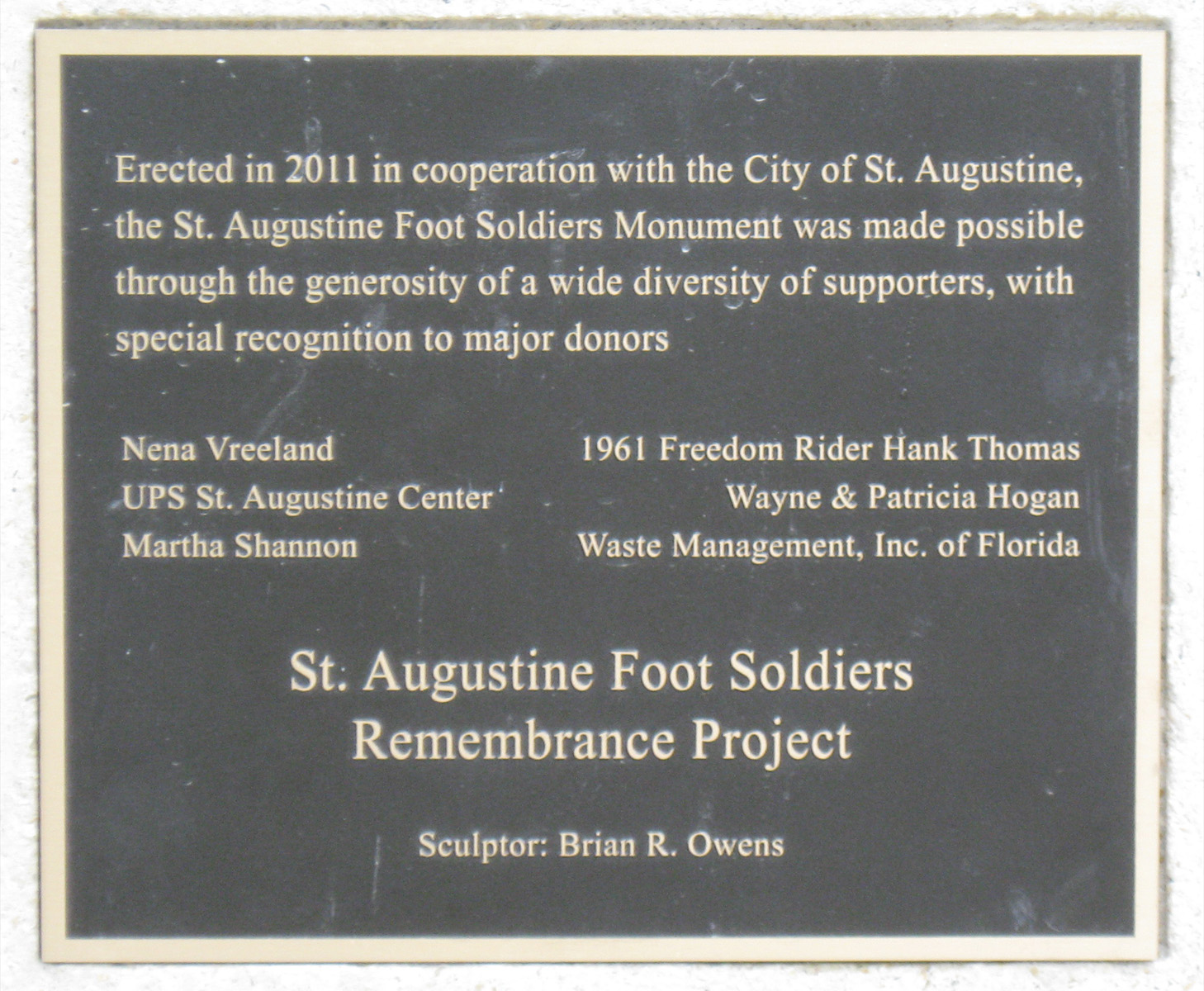
Donor recognition plaque

== See also ==
- Civil rights movement in popular culture
