= St. Augustine movement =

Part of the wider Civil Rights Movement in St. Augustine, Florida

- Part of the Civil Rights Movement
- Martin Luther King Jr. being denied entry to the "whites-only" Monson Motor Lodge restaurant by owner James "Jimmy" Brock
- Date: 1963–1964 (2 years)
- Location: St. Augustine, Florida
- Result: Catalyst to passage of Civil Rights Act of 1964

Parties
NAACP Youth Council (NYC); Southern Christian Leadership Conference (SCLC)	Governor of Florida; St. Johns County Sheriff's Department; Mayor of St. Augustine; St. Augustine Police Department; Monson Motor Lodge; Ancient City Hunting Club (ACHC); National States' Rights Party (NSRP); John Birch Society (JBS); United Florida KKK

Lead figures
NYC members: Robert Hayling; Clyde Jenkins; James Hauser; James Jackson; SCLC members: Martin Luther King Jr.; Ralph Abernathy; Hosea Williams; Andrew Young	State of Florida: C. Farris Bryant, Governor; St. Johns County: L.O. Davis, Sheriff; City of St. Augustine: Joseph Shelley, Mayor; Virgil Stuart, Police Chief; Business: James "Jimmy" Brock, motel manager; ACHC member: Halstead 'Hoss' Manucy; NSRP member: Rev. Charles Conley 'Connie' Lynch

The St. Augustine movement was a part of the wider Civil Rights Movement, taking place in St. Augustine, Florida, from 1963 to 1964. It was a major event in the city's long history and had a role in the passage of the Civil Rights Act of 1964.

== Background ==
Despite the unanimous 1954 Supreme Court decision in Brown v. Board of Education that the "separate but equal" legal status of racially segregated public schools rendered them inherently unequal, St. Augustine still had only six black children admitted into white schools by 1964. The home of one of the families of these children was burned by local segregationists, while another family had their car burned during a PTA meeting at Fullerwood School.

=== 400th anniversary ===
St. Augustine was scheduled to celebrate its 400th anniversary in 1965. Memorial ceremonies for the anniversary were expected to get the attention of international media, and city officials excluded African Americans from planning of the festivities. The preparations focused mainly on the "Spanish past that endorsed pluralism and Pan-American brotherhood" while ignoring the history of slavery in the US and the Jim Crow laws still in force in the Southern states at the time.

=== General characteristics ===
St. Augustine was a city with a population of about 15,000 and was one of Florida's major tourist attractions in the pre–Disney World era, with many businesses reliant on the tourist trade. In 1964, Black people accounted for 23% of the population but racial segregation and Jim Crow prevented them from playing any sort of role in the local political and economic affairs.

== History ==
=== Robert Hayling ===
Dr. Robert Hayling is generally considered the "father" of the St. Augustine movement. A Tallahassee native, Hayling served as an Air Force officer, and then became the first black dentist in Florida to be elected to the American Dental Association. He set up business in St. Augustine in 1960 and joined the local National Association for the Advancement of Colored People (NAACP) that year. Under his leadership the local chapter was growing and began to put pressure on the local government to desegregate the city. An opportunity to protest came in 1963 as St. Augustine was preparing for its 400th anniversary. The local NAACP wrote a letter to Vice President Lyndon B. Johnson asking that he cancel his visit to St. Augustine in March 1963 where he was planning on dedicating a Spanish landmark.

While the campaign was successful at convincing Vice President Lyndon B. Johnson to speak before an interracial audience in St. Augustine, it had no effect on the overall Jim Crow laws. The NAACP campaign lacked a direct action component and Hayling believed that this was a major failing. Hayling founded an NAACP Youth Council that engaged in nonviolent direct action, including wade-ins at the local segregated swimming pools.

=== Sit-in protest ===
A sit-in protest on July 18, 1963, at the local Woolworth's lunch counter ended in the arrest and imprisonment of 16 young black protesters and seven juveniles. These protesters were offered plea deals offering release in return for a pledge to abstain from any further protesting. Four of the arrested juveniles, two girls and two boys, refused the plea bargain. These four children were JoeAnn Anderson, Audrey Nell Edwards, Willie Carl Singleton, and Samuel White, and they came to be known as "the St. Augustine Four". They were sent to "reform" school and retained for six months. Their case was publicized as an egregious injustice by Jackie Robinson, the NAACP, the Pittsburgh Courier, and others. Finally, a special action of the governor and cabinet of Florida freed them in January 1964.

=== Armed attacks and self-defense ===
In addition to nonviolent direct action, the St. Augustine movement practiced armed self-defense. In spring of 1963, the NAACP aggressively lobbied for the city's federal funding to be suspended until it came into compliance with existing federal civil rights legislation and the Brown v. Board of Education decision. This led to the Ku Klux Klan (KKK) stepping up its death threats against activists. In June, Dr. Hayling publicly stated, "I and the others have armed. We will shoot first and answer questions later. We are not going to die like Medgar Evers." The comment made national headlines. When Klan nightriders terrorized black neighborhoods in St. Augustine, Hayling's NAACP members often drove them off with gunfire.

In September 1963, the Klan staged a rally of several hundred Klansmen on the outskirts of town. They seized Robert Hayling and three other NAACP activists (Clyde Jenkins, James Jackson, and James Hauser), and beat them with fists, chains, and clubs. The four men were rescued by Florida Highway Patrol officers. St. Johns County Sheriff L. O. Davis arrested four white men for the beating and also arrested the four unarmed blacks for "assaulting" the large crowd of armed Klansmen. Charges against the Klansmen were dismissed, but Hayling was convicted of "criminal assault" against the KKK mob.

After the incident at the September Klan rally, tensions escalated further. In October, a carload of KKK night riders raced through the black neighborhood of Lincolnville shooting into homes. When blacks returned fire, one Klansman was killed. NAACP activist Rev. Goldie Eubanks and three others were indicted for murder (they were later acquitted). Disturbed by Hayling's militancy, the national NAACP removed him as head of the Youth Council. Hayling, Eubanks, Henry Twine, Kathrine Twine, and other activists left the NAACP and contacted the Southern Christian Leadership Conference (SCLC), led by Martin Luther King Jr., for assistance.

=== Spring Break protests ===
In the spring of 1964, Hayling put out a call to northern college students to come to St. Augustine for spring break, not to go to the beach, but to take part in civil rights activities. Accompanying them were four prominent Boston women: the wife of the vice president of the John Hancock Insurance Company, and three wives of Episcopal bishops (including Hester Campbell, daughter of William Ernest Hocking and granddaughter of John Boyle O'Reilly). It was front-page news on April 1, 1964, when one of them, Mrs. Mary Parkman Peabody, the 72-year-old mother of the governor of Massachusetts, was arrested in an integrated group at the Ponce de Leon Motor Lodge, north of town.

That event brought the movement in St. Augustine to international attention. Over the next few months, the city got more publicity than it had ever previously received in its four centuries of existence. The massive nonviolent direct action campaign was led by Hayling and by SCLC staff, including: Martin Luther King Jr., Ralph Abernathy, Andrew Young, Hosea Williams, C. T. Vivian, Fred Shuttlesworth, Willie Bolden, J. T. Johnson, Dorothy Cotton, and others. Civil rights activists made St. Augustine the stage for a moral drama enacted before a world audience.

=== Increasing violence ===
From May until July 1964, protesters endured abuse and verbal assaults, usually without any retaliation, although this time police were often intervening to prevent violence between protesters and counter-protesters. The movement engaged in nightly marches down King Street. The protesters were met by white segregationists who violently attacked them. Marchers responded to these attacks, like the one on Andrew Young, with the non-violent tactics they had been trained to use. Despite this, hundreds of the marchers were arrested and incarcerated. The jail was filled, so subsequent detainees were kept in an uncovered stockade in the hot sun.

When attempts were made to integrate the beaches of Anastasia Island, demonstrators were beaten and driven into the water by segregationists. Some of the protesters could not swim and had to be saved from possible drowning by other demonstrators.

Death threats against the leadership were reaching a fever pitch, especially against Dr. King. In the first week of June, a cottage that was scheduled to house the SCLC president went up in flames. In response, Hayling and his team stepped up their armed patrols, a policy which King personally disapproved of. Nonetheless, King was under Hayling's armed protection every night he spent in St. Augustine. On June 10, the filibuster against the Civil Rights Act (one of the longest filibusters in history) finally collapsed.

=== Monson Motor Lodge ===
St. Augustine was the only place in Florida where King was arrested; his arrest there occurred on June 11, 1964, on the steps of the Monson Motor Lodge restaurant. He wrote a "Letter from the St. Augustine Jail" to his old friend, Rabbi Israel Dresner, in New Jersey, urging him to recruit rabbis to come to St. Augustine and take part in the movement. The result was the arrest of 17 rabbis on June 18, 1964, at the Monson motel, the largest mass arrest of rabbis in American history. Among the arrested were Eugene Borowitz, Michael Robinson, Murray Saltzman and Allen Secher. While in jail, the rabbis authored a manifesto titled, "Why We Went".

On June 18, a grand jury suggested that SCLC withdraw for a 30-day cooling-off period. In response, Hayling and King released a joint statement declaring "there will be neither peace nor tranquility in this community until the righteous demands of the Negro are fully met".

The demonstrations came to a climax when a group of black and white protesters jumped into the swimming pool at the Monson Motor Lodge. In response to the protest, James Brock—who was the manager of the hotel, in addition to being the president of the Florida Hotel & Motel Association—poured what he claimed to be muriatic acid into the pool to burn the protesters. Photographs of this, and of a policeman jumping into the pool to arrest them, were broadcast around the world. The political impact in America extended to the highest levels. According to White House audio recordings, President Johnson said, "Our whole foreign policy and everything could go to hell over this. Yesterday, in the swimming pool in St. Augustine, they jumped in and the police jumped in with their clothes on. They started pouring acid in the pool. I saw that on television."

== Aftermath ==
=== Official committee ===
On June 30, Florida Governor Farris Bryant announced the formation of a biracial committee to restore interracial communication in St. Augustine. Although matters were far from resolved, national SCLC leaders left St. Augustine on 1 July, the day before President Lyndon Johnson signed the Civil Rights Act into law.

=== Racial tensions ===
Despite this national success, black residents in St. Augustine continued to face violence and intimidation. Consistent threats and picketing by the Klan led many of the town's businesses to remain segregated. Although SCLC continued to provide some financial support to activists in St. Augustine beyond July 1964, the organization never returned to the city. With his dental practice financially destitute after the loss of his white patients, and the safety of his wife and children uncertain, Robert Hayling decided to move to Ft. Lauderdale, Florida, in 1966.

The black Florida Normal Industrial and Memorial College, whose students had been involved in the protests, felt itself unwelcome in St. Augustine and in 1965 purchased a tract of land in Dade County, moving there in 1968. The school is today Florida Memorial University.

== Legacy ==
=== Monson Motor Lodge ===
The motel and pool were demolished in March 2003, despite five years of protests, thus eliminating one of the nation's important landmarks of the civil rights movement. A Hilton Hotel was built on the site. In 2003, nearly four decades after Robert Hayling left St. Augustine, the city's mayor issued a Certificate of Recognition for Hayling's "contributions to the betterment of our society," and a street was named after him.

=== St. Augustine Foot Soldiers Monument ===
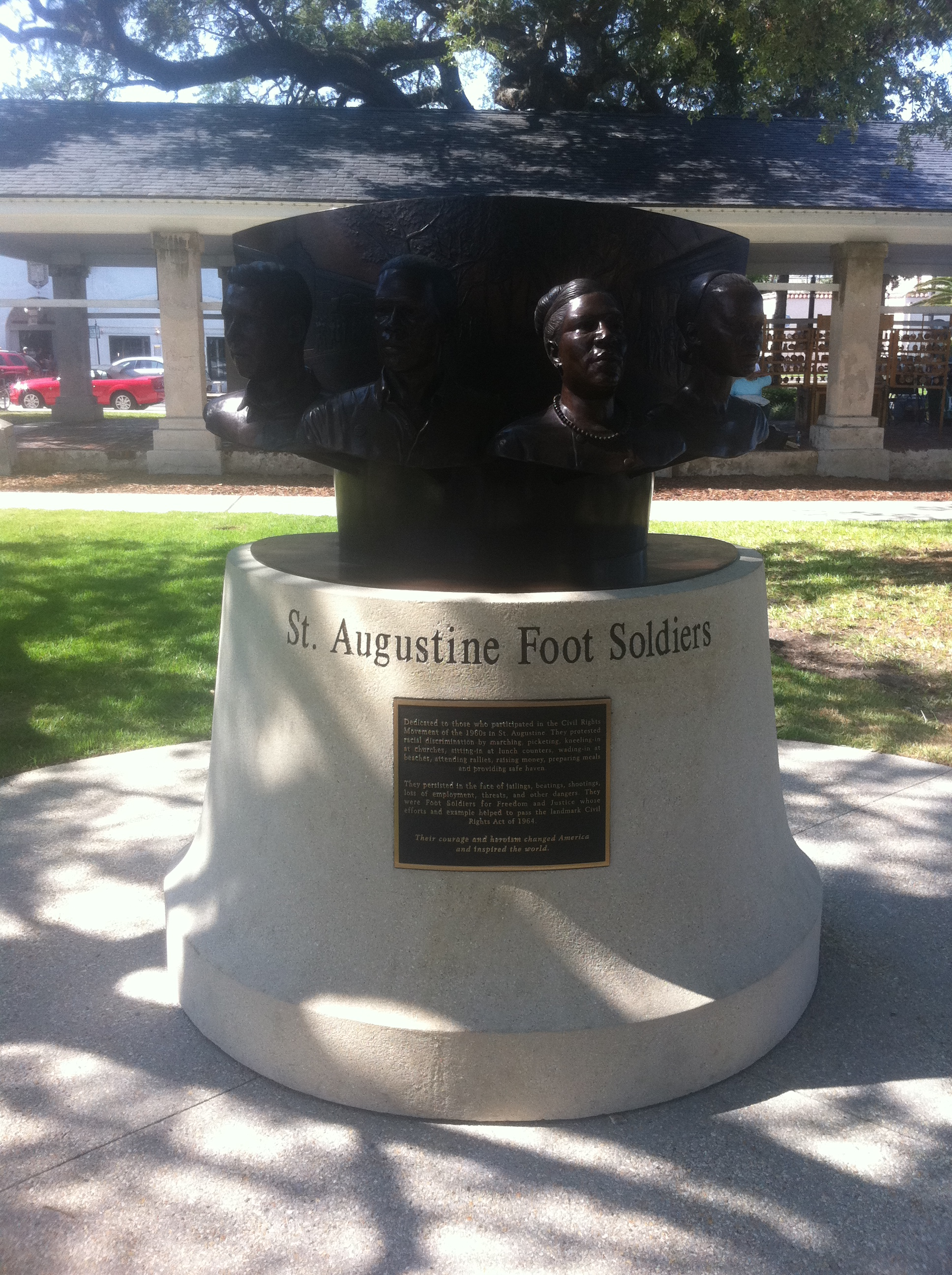
St. Augustine Foot Soldiers Monument, dedicated May 14, 2011

The St. Augustine Foot Soldiers Monument is located near the corner of King St. and Charlotte St., in the Southeast corner of the Plaza De La Constitucion, which is a prominent, historic public park. The monument, commissioned by the St. Augustine Foot Soldiers Remembrance Project, Inc., was unveiled on May 14, 2011.

=== The Resilience: Black Heritage in St. Augustine Project ===
Resilience: Black Heritage in St. Augustine is a yearlong community project celebrated in 2021 by local archives, libraries, and museums in recognition of the many contributions the Black community has made and continues to make in building St. Augustine's cultural heritage through more than 455 years of its history. Fourteen local institutions throughout St. Augustine, Florida, Jacksonville, Florida, and Gainesville, Florida have contributed to the project, including Accord Civil Rights Museum and Freedom Trail, Castillo de San Marcos National Monument, Flagler College Proctor Library, Flagler College Honors Program, Florida Museum of Natural History, Fort Mose Historical Society, Governor's House Cultural Center and Museum, Lincolnville Museum and Cultural Center, St. Augustine Historical Society, St Johns County Public Library System, Timucuan Ecological and Historic Preserve, University of North Florida Digital Humanities Institute, Ximenez-Fatio House Museum, and the St. Johns County Cultural Council. Throughout 2021 collaborating institutions are hosting a variety of programs, lectures, tours, and special digital humanities projects, and the group has also created a website that contains many educational resources. The Resilience logo is a bell, symbolizing freedom and liberty, themes interwoven into the city's past and present.

== Notable people ==
- Mimi Jones (1947–2020), civil rights activist

== See also ==
- Excelsior Museum and Cultural Center
- Lincolnville Historic District
