= Michael Robinson (rabbi) =

American Reform rabbi

Rabbi Michael Robinson
- Michael Robinson, in the 1970s

Personal life
- Born: Michael Aaron Robinson; December 13, 1924 Asheville, North Carolina, US
- Died: July 20, 2006 (aged 81) Sebastopol, California, US
- Spouse: Ruth Hertzman
- Children: 3
- Parent(s): Sam and Esther Robinson

Religious life
- Religion: Judaism
- Denomination: Reform Judaism

Jewish leader
- Position: Rabbi Emeritus
- Synagogue: Temple Israel of Northern Westchester
- Began: 1960
- Ended: 1989
- Other: Rabbi Emeritus, Shomrei Torah (1989–1996)
- Semikhah: Hebrew Union College, Cincinnati, 1952

Michael Aaron Robinson (December 13, 1924 – July 20, 2006) was an American Reform rabbi, civil rights activist, and human rights activist. He was known for his association with Martin Luther King Jr., with whom he marched in Selma and on whose request he participated in a 1964 demonstration in St. Augustine, Florida, at which he was arrested and jailed together with 15 other Reform rabbis.

He was for decades the rabbi of Temple Israel of Northern Westchester in Northern Westchester, New York. After his retirement, he served for seven years as a part-time rabbi at Congregation Shomrei Torah in Santa Rosa, California.

== Early life and education ==
Michael Aaron Robinson was born on December 13, 1924, in Asheville, North Carolina. His parents were Samuel Robinson (1891–1973), an optometrist who had immigrated to the United States from Belarus, and Esther Kroman Robinson. Michael was one of seven children. His family was Reform and attended temple each Friday night. Growing up in Asheville, which had about 200 Jewish families in total, most of Michael's friends were not Jewish. His father treated many black patients and was known to not give priority to white patients when black patients had arrived first. As a result, some of his white patients turned to other doctors. At age ten, Michael began sitting in the back of a bus with his black nanny, and later wrote: "When I was ten years old I began sitting on the back seat of the bus with 'colored people'. I never returned to the front seat".

He earned a B.A. at the University of Cincinnati. During World War II, while studying architecture at North Carolina State College, he interrupted his studies to join the US Navy. He worked in electronics maintenance on a landing ship tanker in the Pacific theater, and returned home with the desire to be a rabbi and a pacifist.

He received rabbinic ordination from the Hebrew Union College in Cincinnati in 1952, becoming the first North Carolina native to be rabbinically ordained. During his rabbinical studies, he became involved with civil rights activism and organized a student effort to desegregate a local Greek restaurant.

== Rabbinic career ==
Robinson began a rabbinical career with his wife Ruth, who was also a civil rights activist and often sang beside him as a cantorial soloist. After serving as rabbi in Temple De Hirsch in Seattle for three years, in 1955 he joined Temple Beth Israel of Pomona, serving for five years. He went on to serve as rabbi for 29 years at Temple Israel of Northern Westchester in Croton, New York, retiring as Rabbi Emeritus. In the latter congregation, he led drives to raise funds to rebuild black churches that had been burned during civil rights protests, and purchase the van which the Freedom Riders used in Mississippi.

In the summer of 1964, he and other Reform rabbis who were attending the meeting of the Central Conference of American Rabbis answered the call of Martin Luther King Jr. to stand with him for civil rights in St. Augustine, Florida. They were among 70 demonstrators who converged on the Monson House on June 18 and were asked to leave by James Brock, the motel manager. Brock began pushing the demonstrators, who refused to budge; according to The New York Times, "First he pushed the leaders and one by one he pushed the rabbis. As one rabbi was pushed aside another would step forward to take his place". Police arrested the 16 rabbis, including Robinson, Hebrew Union College professor Eugene Borowitz, and Rabbi Allen Secher, along with 25 other protesters. The rabbinical delegation defended their action in a joint letter, Why We Went, which they composed in their jail cell. They were released in the morning after posting a bond; the charges against them were later dropped.

In 1965, Robinson marched with King in Selma. Robinson was imprisoned a second time, with others, for a protest at Livermore, California, against the development of nuclear armaments at the Lawrence Livermore National Laboratory.

He retired to Santa Rosa, California, with his wife, to be closer to their daughter Jude. In 1989, he became a part-time rabbi at Congregation Shomrei Torah in Santa Rosa, where the congregation grew from 30 to 100 families during his seven-year tenure. He retired in 1996 as Rabbi Emeritus of Shomrei Torah as well.

== Other activities ==
In 1977, Robinson earned a Ph.D. from the Union Theological Seminary in New York City.

Robinson served on the board of the Fellowship of Reconciliation, an interfaith peace organization, for decades. In 1996, he became a founding member of Angry White Guys for Affirmative Action. He was a proponent of same-sex marriage and was involved in protests against nuclear warfare and apartheid. He was active in the Sonoma County Task Force on Homelessness, Children's Village, the Living Wage Coalition, Habitat for Humanity, the Sonoma County Peace and Justice Center, and the Sonoma Land Trust.

== Personal life ==
Robinson and his wife Ruth (nee Hertzman) had two daughters and a son. Robinson died on July 20, 2006, of cancer at his home in Sebastopol, California.

An annual Rabbi Michael Robinson Memorial Lecture is presented by Congregation Shomrei Torah.
