= Lincolnville Museum and Cultural Center =

Museum in Florida

Coordinates: 29.8856°N 81.3151°W

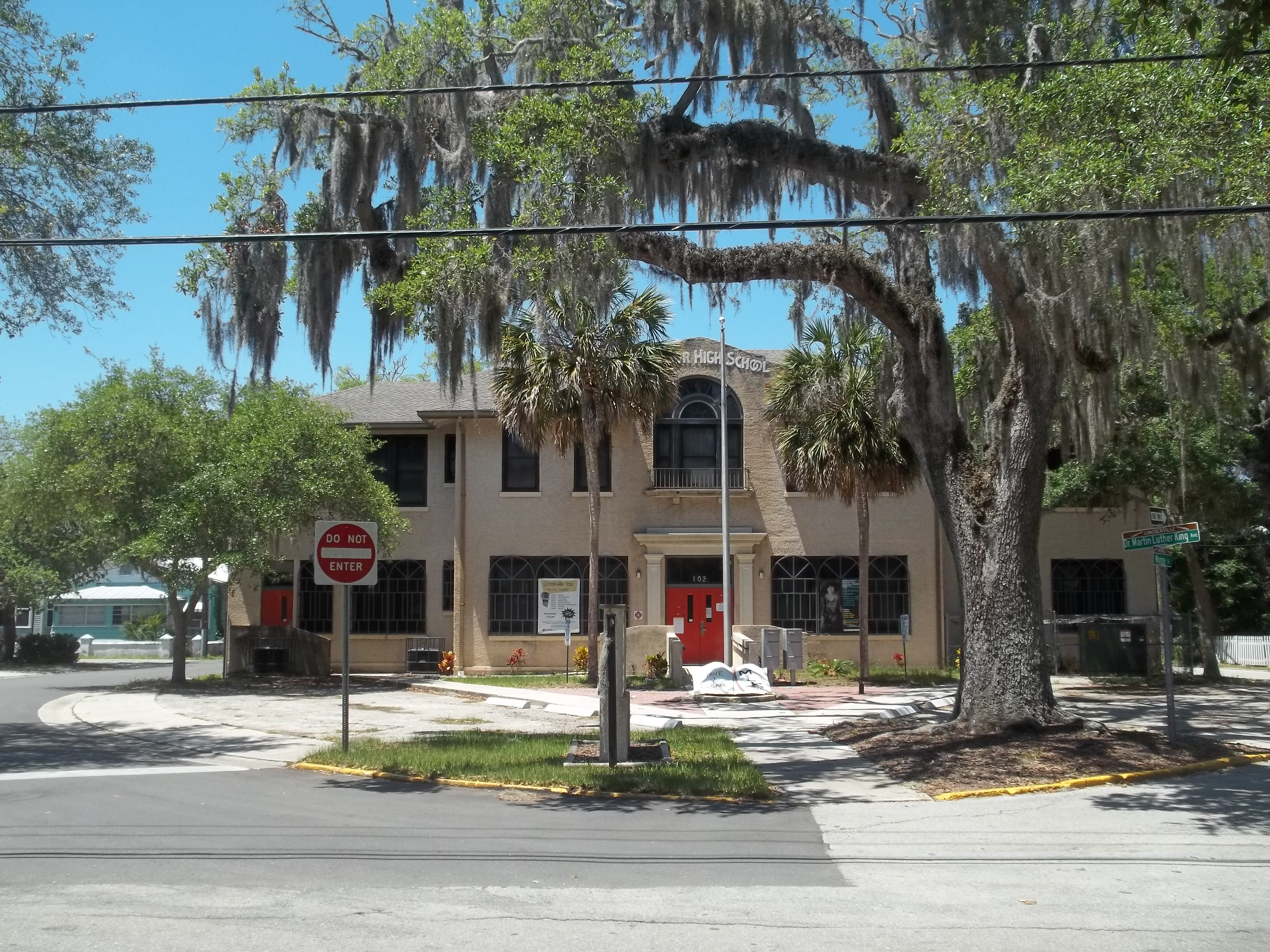
Shot of the Lincolnville Museum and Cultural Center

Lincolnville Museum and Cultural Center (formerly Excelsior Museum and Cultural Center) is an African American history museum located at 102 Martin Luther King Avenue in St. Augustine, Florida. It is located in the former Excelsior School, St. Augustine's first black public high school. The museum opened in 2005.

== History ==
Lincolnville is now a neighborhood of the city of St. Augustine, but was originally a distinct town. It was settled by freed Black slaves after the American Civil War.

The museum is located in the former Excelsior High School, the first public high school for African Americans to open in St. Augustine. The first public school for African American children was built in St. Augustine in 1901. As with all public schools in Florida at the time, it was segregated. "School #2" or "the Colored School" was built in 1925 as St. Augustine's high school for Black students. It was designed by St. Augustine architect Fred A. Henderich, and renamed Excelsior in 1928. Alumni include NFL star Willie Galimore and St. Augustine Movement civil rights leaders Henry and Kat Twine. Excelsior School closed in 1968 and was used for several years for local government offices.

== About the museum ==
The museum was primarily founded by Otis Mason. Mason was an Excelsion High School alumnus who, in 1984, became the first Black superintendent of the St. Johns County School District. It opened as the Excelsior Museum and Cultural Center in 2005, and changed its name to the Lincolnville Museum and Cultural Center in 2012. In 2017, the Lincolnville Museum and Cultural Center became regularly open to visitors.

The museum's focus is on the history, culture, and contributions of African Americans in the greater St. Augustine area. This includes the history of Lincolnville, the role runaway slaves played in building Fort Mose, the history of the area's Black churches, Black historical and social societies, Black businesspeople in the area, and visits to St. Augustine by Martin Luther King Jr. The museum's collections include artwork, memorabilia, and photographs. Most of the exhibits focus on the civil rights era in St. Augustine history, but in 2016 the museum began expanding its coverage to other parts of area history.

It had 9,000 square feet (840 m^{2}) of exhibit space in 2019.

In 2018, St. Johns County used a portion of its bed tax revenues to support a new exhibit at the museum. The new exhibit, Lincolnville LifeWays, focuses on individuals and places of importance in Lincolnville history. Included are photos by Richard Twine, an African American photographer who took extensive photographs of everyday people and places Lincolnville in the 1920s.

The Lincolnville Museum received a $500,000 grant from the National Park Service in September 2019 for the repair, preservation, and renovation of the building and exhibits.
