= St. Augustine Aquarium =

Aquarium in St. Augustine, Florida

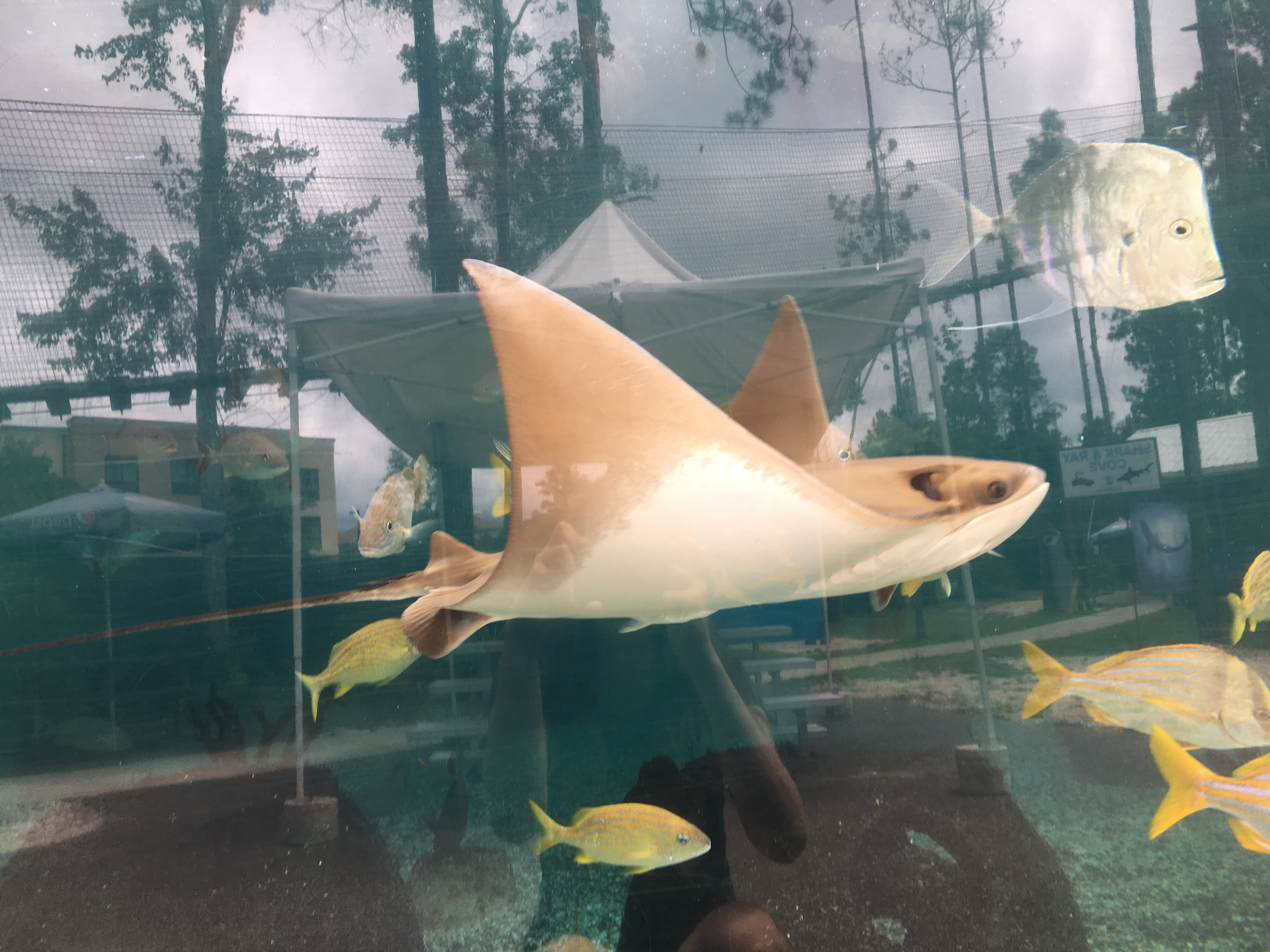
- Interactive map of St. Augustine Aquarium
- 29°54′50″N 81°23′52″W
- Date opened: 19 December 2016
- Location: 2045 FL-16, St. Augustine, Florida, 32084 United States
- Land area: 5 acres
- No. of animals: 250+
- Website: www.saaquarium.com

The St. Augustine Aquarium is a public aquarium located at 2045 Fl-16, St. Augustine, Florida in the United States. It opened in 2016, and houses over 250 animals.

== History ==
The St. Augustine Aquarium was founded by couple Shawn and Kathy Hiester. Shawn has a background in designing and construction, while Kathy has a background in sales, marketing, and biology. Both had a passion for marine life from an early age, and spent over two years planning for opening their own aquarium. Originally, it was planned that an aquarium would be built in an empty landfill in the Lincolnville neighborhood. The St. Augustine City Commission voted not to continue the project in April 2014, citing concerns from the community that the aquarium would worsen already slow traffic in the area.

In late 2014, the Hiesters bought five acres of land located off of State Road 16 in St. Augustine, Florida, and started construction. The first phase of the aquarium, an outdoor snorkeling tank, was scheduled to open in spring of 2015, while an indoor area featuring more exhibits was scheduled to open in summer of 2016. However, the snorkel experience did not open until December 2016, and indoor exhibits are still in the designing and permitting phase.

== Exhibits ==
Exhibits at the St. Augustine Aquarium include:

- Snorkel Adventure: An 80,000 gallon open-air tank containing over 100 different species of fish native to Florida and the Caribbean, including queen angelfish and cownose rays. Visitors can view the tank from outside, or pay extra to go snorkeling in it.
