= Lincolnville Historic District =

Historic district in Florida, United States

- U.S. National Register of Historic Places
- U.S. Historic district
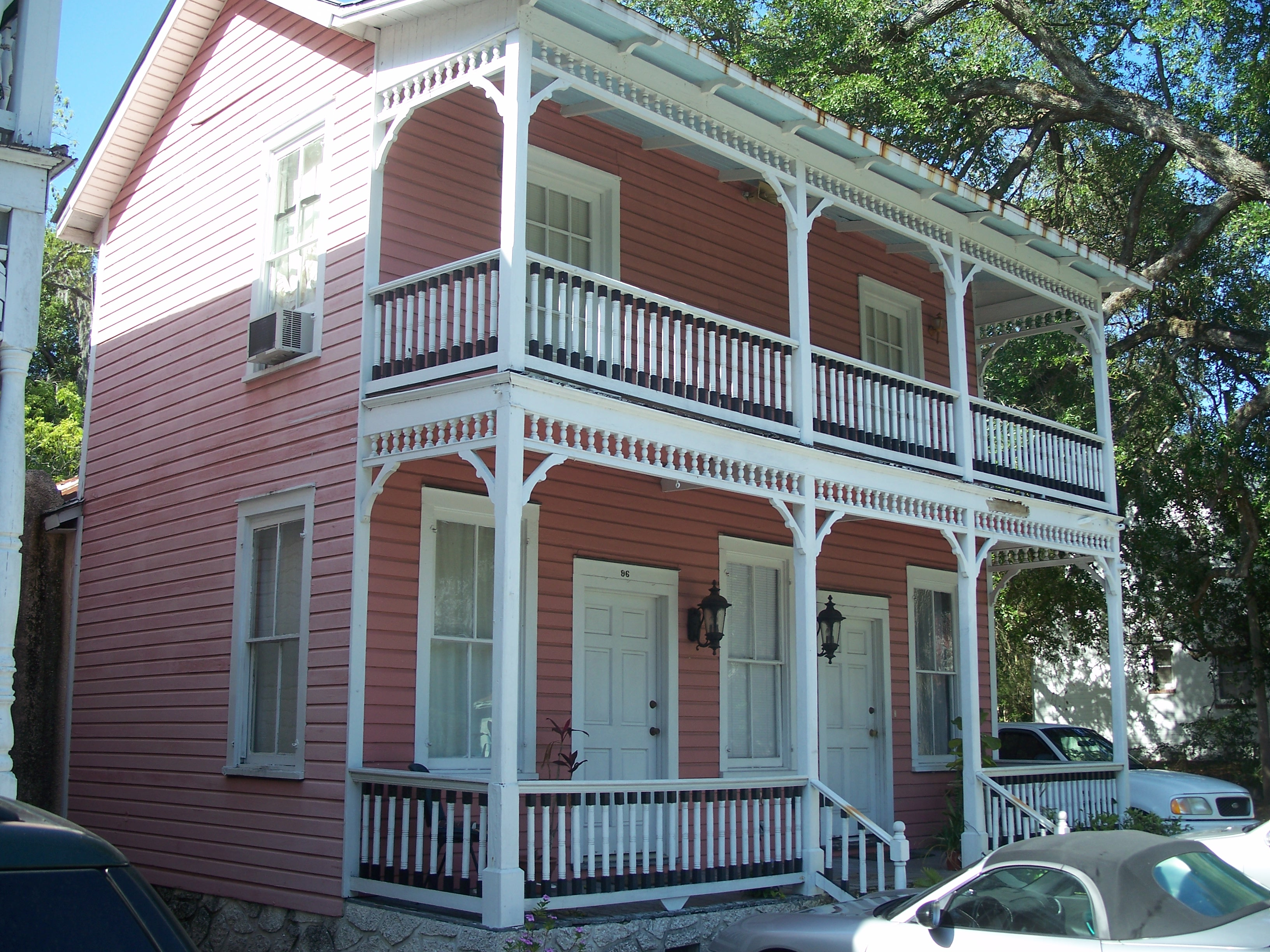
- House in the district

- Location within Florida Location within the United States
- Location: St. Augustine, Florida United States
- Coordinates: 29°53′5″N 81°18′52″W
- Area: 1,400 acres (5.7 km^{2})
- NRHP reference No.: 91000979
- Added to NRHP: November 29, 1991

Lincolnville Historic District (formerly known as Little Africa) is a neighborhood in St. Augustine, Florida established by freedmen following the American Civil War and located on the southwest peninsula of the "nation's oldest city." It was designated as an historic district in 1991 and listed on the National Register of Historic Places. Originally recorded with 548 contributing buildings, the district is bounded by Cedar, Riberia, Cerro and Washington streets and DeSoto Place.

In the late 20th century, numerous African Americans moved from this district to newer housing in suburbs, following the postwar pattern of settlement. In the 1990s, the city of St. Augustine engaged in extensive demolitions in Lincolnville. The number of surviving historic buildings was markedly reduced. Since the turn of the 21st century, the city has sought more demolitions to enable redevelopment of the area.

== History ==
The community was established after the American Civil War in 1866. Freedmen (and women) Peter Sanks, Matilda Papy, Harriet Weedman, Miles Hancock, Israel McKenzie, Aaron DuPont and Tom Solana leased land for $1.00 a year on what was then the west bank of Maria Sanchez Creek, across from the developed part of St. Augustine. The rest of the peninsula was developed as two large orange grove plantations: the Dumas plantation "Yalaha" (Seminole word for orange) at the northern end and "Buena Esperanza" (Spanish for "Good Hope") at the south.

The freedmen originally called their settlement Africa, or Little Africa. After streets were laid out in 1878, it came to be known as Lincolnville. In the 1860s the northwest corner of modern Lincolnville was an 5-acre (20,000 m^{2}) orange grove owned by Abraham Lincoln's private secretary, John Hay. He later served as Secretary of State under Theodore Roosevelt).

Over the decades the settlement was expanded from this northeast area, around present-day Washington, Oneida, Dumas, St. Francis, St. Benedict and DeHaven streets, and businessmen developed the entire peninsula. It was characterized by narrow streets, small lots, and houses built close to the street line, similar to the colonial St. Augustine style and land-use pattern.

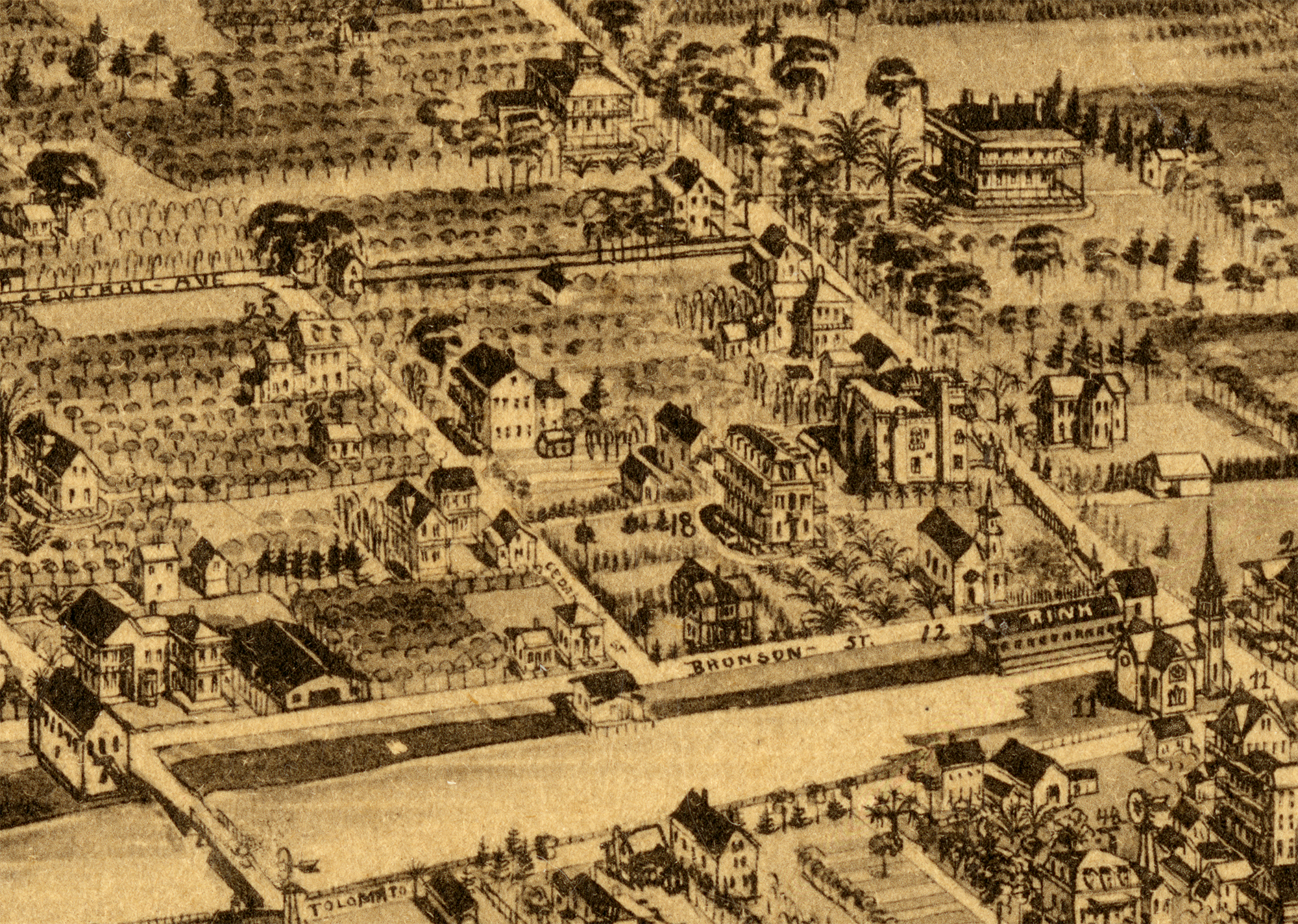
Excerpt from 1885 birdseye view of St. Augustine, Florida, depicting the Lincolnville neighborhood

When Standard Oil magnate Henry Flagler came to St. Augustine in the 1880s, he redeveloped the city to serve as a "Winter Newport," a resort for the wealthy. His changes also affected Lincolnville. He filled in the northern reaches of Maria Sanchez Creek to create high ground for development (the landfill included dirt with archeological remains extracted from the site and environs of Fort Mose). His Standard Oil partner William Warden dredged the southern part of the creek to create what is now Maria Sanchez Lake. This expanded the eastern boundary of Lincolnville to the Ponce de Leon Barracks at 172-180 Cordova Street. The Barracks is now considered one of the historic district's major buildings. During the late 19th and early 20th century, it housed African-American servants and others who worked at Flagler's hotels in the city.

Some of the African-American waiters from the hotels formed the first professional black baseball team in the United States. When they played locally, they were known as the Ponce de Leon Giants; when they played in the North, they were known as the Cuban Giants. One member of the team, Frank Grant, was later elected to the Baseball Hall of Fame. Jacksonville native and nationally known writer James Weldon Johnson wrote about the baseball team in his 1933 autobiography Along This Way.

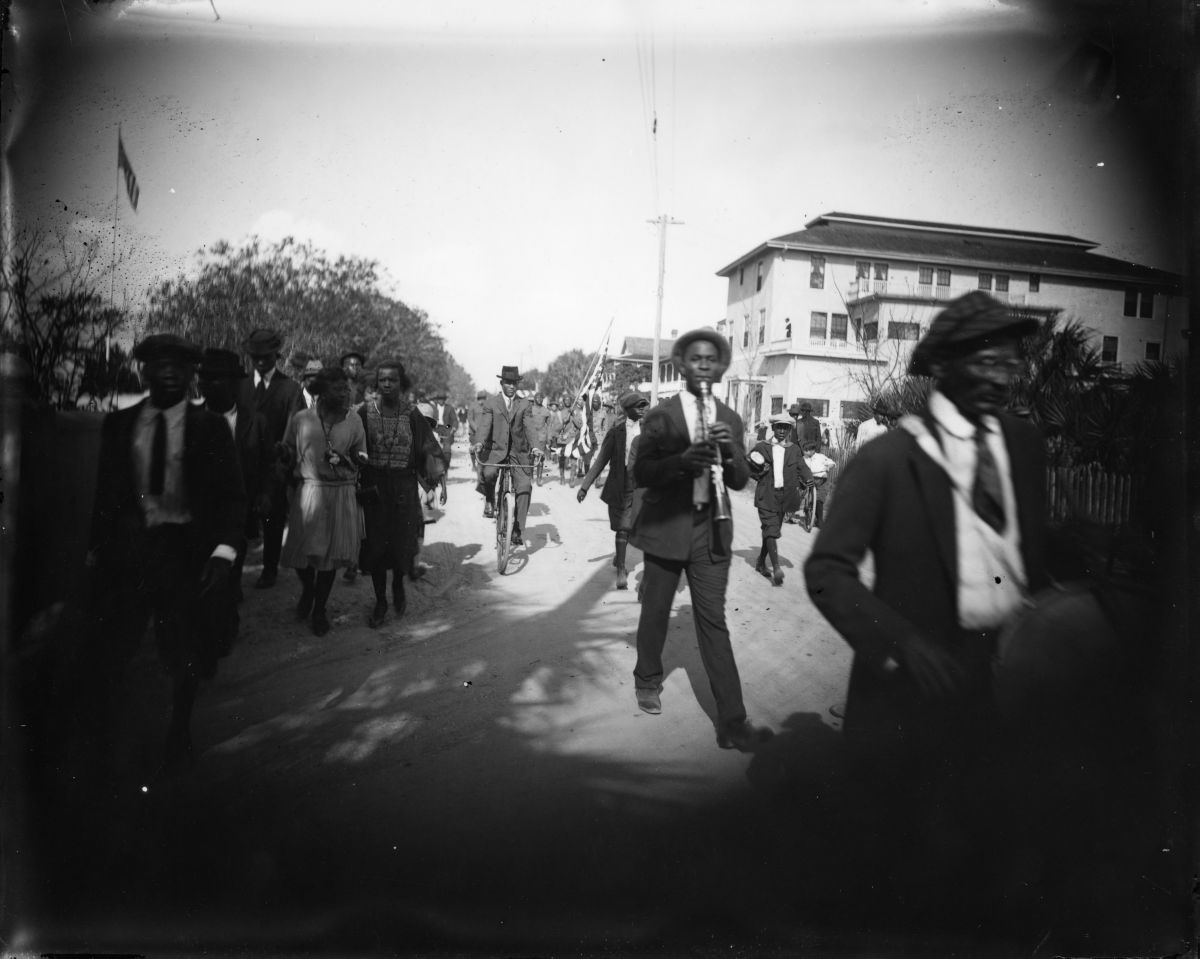
Photograph from Emancipation Day in Lincolnville by Richard Twine

Lincolnville businessman Frank B. Butler established Butler Beach, Florida as a beach resort for African Americans who were barred from the area's other beaches during segregation.

In the 1940s the Flagler estate converted the Barracks to the Lakeside Apartments and restricted tenants to whites only, under state racial segregation laws in effect since the turn of the century. In the 21st century, the building was renovated and redeveloped for condominium sales. Marketing did not include this history.

During the Civil Rights Movement, Lincolnville was the base of activists who worked for the end of racial segregation in schools and public facilities in St. Augustine. (See St. Augustine movement.) Subject to rising Ku Klux Klan violence, in 1964 local activists appealed for help to the Martin Luther King Jr.-led Southern Christian Leadership Conference. Rev. King and activists from other parts of the country came to join local activists in non-violent protests. Hundreds were arrested and filled the jails; their struggle brought national attention to the issues and aided Congressional passage of the Civil Rights Act of 1964 and the Voting Rights Act of 1965.

== Recognition and redevelopment ==
After the end of legal segregation, some African Americans began to move to other areas of newer, suburban housing, joining the major postwar trend in the United States. Employment and population in this area have declined, but the city wanted to recognize the rich history and architectural resources. In 1991 the Lincolnville Historic District was documented and listed on the National Register of Historic Places. Bounded by Cedar, Riberia, Cerro and Washington streets and DeSoto Place, it contained 548 historic buildings.

At the same time, migration to Florida from other parts of the country increased. The city of St. Augustine supported demolition of deteriorating buildings in order to redevelop some of the Lincolnville area for new housing and uses, and numerous historic buildings were taken down. In the 21st century, redevelopment pressure has continued, as new development is yielding higher rates of profit. In 2014, there were plans to build an aquarium, the St. Augustine Aquarium, in an empty landfill in the neighborhood, but the project was blocked due to concerns about traffic.

== See also ==
- St. Benedict the Moor School
