= National Register of Historic Places listings in St. Johns County, Florida =

Location of St. Johns County in Florida

This is a list of the National Register of Historic Places listings in St. Johns County, Florida.

This is intended to be a complete list of the properties and districts on the National Register of Historic Places in St. Johns County, Florida, United States. The locations of National Register properties and districts for which the latitude and longitude coordinates are included below, may be seen in a map.

There are 56 properties and districts listed on the National Register in the county, including six National Historic Landmarks.

This National Park Service list is complete through NPS recent listings posted November 21, 2025.

Contents: Counties in Florida (non-linked contain no National Register listings)
Alachua - Baker - Bay - Bradford - Brevard - Broward - Calhoun - Charlotte - Citrus - Clay - Collier - Columbia - DeSoto - Dixie - Duval - Escambia - Flagler - Franklin - Gadsden - Gilchrist - Glades - Gulf - Hamilton - Hardee - Hendry - Hernando - Highlands - Hillsborough (Tampa) - Holmes - Indian River - Jackson - Jefferson - Lafayette - Lake - Lee - Leon - Levy - Liberty - Madison - Manatee - Marion - Martin - Miami-Dade (Miami) - Monroe - Nassau - Okaloosa - Okeechobee - Orange - Osceola - Palm Beach - Pasco - Pinellas - Polk - Putnam - St. Johns - St. Lucie - Santa Rosa - Sarasota - Seminole - Sumter - Suwannee - Taylor - Union - Volusia - Wakulla - Walton - Washington

== Current listings ==
	Name on the Register	Image	Date listed	Location	City or town	Description
1	Abbott Tract Historic District	Abbott Tract Historic District	July 21, 1983 (#83001438)	Roughly bounded by Matanzas Bay and Pine, San Marco, and Shenandoah Aves. 29°54′04″N 81°18′50″W	St. Augustine	
2	Alcazar Hotel	Alcazar Hotel	February 24, 1971 (#71001013)	79 King St. 29°53′30″N 81°18′51″W	St. Augustine	
3	Avero House	Avero House	June 13, 1972 (#72001459)	39 St. George St. 29°58′44″N 81°18′48″W	St. Augustine	
4	Bridge of Lions	Bridge of Lions	November 19, 1982 (#82001040)	King St. 29°53′33″N 81°18′27″W	St. Augustine	
5	Castillo de San Marcos National Monument	Castillo de San Marcos National Monument	October 15, 1966 (#66000062)	1 Castillo Dr. 29°53′52″N 81°18′41″W	St. Augustine	A National Monument
6	Cathedral of St. Augustine	Cathedral of St. Augustine	April 15, 1970 (#70000844)	Cathedral St. between Charlotte and St. George Sts. 29°53′34″N 81°18′45″W	St. Augustine	
7	City of St. Augustine Miniature Golf Course	City of St. Augustine Miniature Golf Course	November 19, 2014 (#14000953)	111 Avenida Menendez; 29°53′30″N 81°18′37″W	St. Augustine	
8	Constitution Obelisk	Constitution Obelisk	December 18, 2012 (#12000364)	Plaza de la Constitution; 29°53′33″N 81°18′45″W	St. Augustine	
9	Dixie Highway-Hastings, Espanola and Bunnell Road	Dixie Highway-Hastings, Espanola and Bunnell Road	April 20, 2005 (#05000311)	Roughly Espanola in Flagler County to County Route 204 in St. Johns County; 29°34′49″N 81°20′35″W	Espanola	Extends into Flagler County
10	Fish Island Site		June 13, 1972 (#72001460)	Address Restricted	St. Augustine	
11	Fort Matanzas National Monument	Fort Matanzas National Monument	October 15, 1966 (#66000098)	15 miles south of St. Augustine; 29°42′55″N 81°14′21″W	St. Augustine	A National Monument
12	Fort Matanzas National Monument Headquarters and Visitor Center	Fort Matanzas National Monument Headquarters and Visitor Center	December 31, 2008 (#08001245)	8635 State Road A1A, South; 29°42′42″N 81°14′07″W	St. Augustine	
13	Fountain of Youth Archeological Park	Fountain of Youth Archeological Park	June 13, 2016 (#16000361)	11 Magnolia Ave. 29°54′26″N 81°18′58″W	St. Augustine	
14	Fullerwood Park Residential Historic District	Fullerwood Park Residential Historic District	September 24, 2010 (#10000767)	Roughly bounded by San Marcos, Macaris, Hildreth & Hospital Creek; 29°54′59″N 81°19′14″W	St. Augustine	
15	Gonzalez-Alvarez House	Gonzalez-Alvarez House	April 15, 1970 (#70000845)	14 St. Francis St. 29°53′17″N 81°18′36″W	St. Augustine	US National Historic Landmark
16	Government House	Government House	January 7, 2014 (#13000812)	48 King St. 29°53′32″N 81°18′47″W	St. Augustine	part of the Florida's New Deal Resources MPS
17	Grace United Methodist Church	Grace United Methodist Church	November 29, 1979 (#79003132)	8 Carrera St. 29°53′42″N 81°18′54″W	St. Augustine	
18	Hastings High School	Hastings High School	June 14, 2006 (#06000502)	6195 S. Main St. 29°42′40″N 81°30′18″W	Hastings	
19	Hotel Ponce De Leon	Hotel Ponce De Leon	May 6, 1975 (#75002067)	74 King St., bounded by King, Valencia, Sevilla, and Cordova Sts. 29°53′32″N 81°18′54″W	St. Augustine	US National Historic Landmark
20	Lincolnville Historic District	Lincolnville Historic District	November 29, 1991 (#91000979)	Bounded by Cedar, Riberia, Cerro, and Washington Sts. and DeSoto Pl. 29°53′05″N 81°18′52″W	St. Augustine	
21	Lindsley House	Lindsley House	September 10, 1971 (#71001014)	214 St. George St. 29°53′30″N 81°18′48″W	St. Augustine	
22	Llambias House	Llambias House	April 15, 1970 (#70000846)	31 St. Francis St. 29°53′15″N 81°18′39″W	St. Augustine	
23	Lodge and Hut		March 20, 2024 (#100010155)	9177-9179 Old A1A Highway; 29°41′50″N 81°13′23″W	Summer Haven	
24	Father Francisco Lopez Statue	Father Francisco Lopez Statue	June 5, 2012 (#12000317)	27 Ocean Avenue; 29°54′15″N 81°19′00″W	St. Augustine	
25	Xavier Lopez House	Xavier Lopez House	July 1, 1993 (#93000579)	93½ King St. 29°53′29″N 81°18′58″W	St. Augustine	
26	Markland	Markland	December 6, 1978 (#78003080)	102 King St. 29°53′31″N 81°19′02″W	St. Augustine	
27	Menendez Encampment Site	Menendez Encampment Site	September 27, 2016 (#16000295)	21 Magnolia Ave. 29°54′27″N 81°18′59″W	St. Augustine	On the grounds of the Fountain of Youth Archaeological Park.
28	Arthur Milam House	Arthur Milam House	June 7, 2016 (#16000323)	1033 Ponte Vedra Blvd. 30°10′26″N 81°21′34″W	Ponte Vedra Beach	
29	Model Land Company Historic District	Model Land Company Historic District	August 2, 1983 (#83001439)	Roughly bounded by Ponce de Leon Boulevard and King, Cordova, and Orange Sts. 29°53′39″N 81°19′06″W	St. Augustine	
30	Moultrie Church	Moultrie Church	September 8, 2014 (#14000553)	480 Wildwood Dr. 29°48′55″N 81°20′10″W	St. Augustine	
31	Nelmar Terrace Historic District	Nelmar Terrace Historic District	March 28, 2011 (#11000145)	Alfred St., San Carlos Ave., San Marcos Ave., Hospital Creek; 29°54′39″N 81°19′06″W	St. Augustine	
32	North City Historic District	North City Historic District	October 1, 2009 (#09000778)	Roughly bounded by Castillo Drive, San Marcos Avenue, Old Mission Avenue, and U.S. Route 1; 29°54′07″N 81°19′05″W	St. Augustine	
33	Henry S. O'Brien Estate		October 24, 2024 (#100010928)	99 Kelley Lane; 29°49′27″N 81°18′08″W	St. Augustine	
34	O'Reilly House	O'Reilly House	October 15, 1974 (#74002192)	131 Aviles St. 29°53′24″N 81°18′41″W	St. Augustine	
35	Old St. Johns County Jail	Old St. Johns County Jail	August 27, 1987 (#87001427)	167 San Marco Ave. 29°54′28″N 81°19′08″W	St. Augustine	
36	Record Building	Record Building	April 26, 2006 (#06000315)	154 Cordova St. 29°53′20″N 81°18′47″W	St. Augustine	
37	Rodriguez-Avero-Sanchez House	Rodriguez-Avero-Sanchez House	April 16, 1971 (#71001015)	52 St. George St. 29°53′46″N 81°18′49″W	St. Augustine	
38	St. Augustine Alligator Farm Historic District	St. Augustine Alligator Farm Historic District	September 10, 1992 (#92001232)	999 Anastasia Boulevard; 29°52′53″N 81°17′18″W	St. Augustine	
39	St. Augustine Beach Hotel and Beachfront	St. Augustine Beach Hotel and Beachfront	January 11, 2022 (#100007284)	370 FL A1A; 29°51′24″N 81°15′57″W	St. Augustine Beach	
40	St. Augustine Civic Center	St. Augustine Civic Center	April 21, 2005 (#05000316)	10 Castillo Dr. 29°53′55″N 81°18′53″W	St. Augustine	Part of the Florida's New Deal Resources MPS
41	St. Augustine Lighthouse and Keeper's Quarters	St. Augustine Lighthouse and Keeper's Quarters	March 19, 1981 (#81000668)	Old Beach Rd. 29°53′08″N 81°17′19″W	St. Augustine	
42	St. Augustine National Cemetery	St. Augustine National Cemetery	May 16, 2016 (#16000271)	104 Marine St. 29°53′11″N 81°18′34″W	St. Augustine	
43	St. Augustine Public Burying Ground	St. Augustine Public Burying Ground	July 23, 2021 (#100006756)	South Castillo Dr. 29°53′54″N 81°18′50″W	St. Augustine	
44	St. Augustine Town Plan Historic District	St. Augustine Town Plan Historic District	April 15, 1970 (#70000847)	Roughly bounded by Grove Ave., the Matanzas River, and South and Washington Sts. 29°53′36″N 81°18′38″W	St. Augustine	
45	St. Augustine Water Works	St. Augustine Water Works	February 5, 2014 (#13001134)	184 San Marco Ave. 29°54′38″N 81°19′14″W	St. Augustine	
46	Sanchez Homestead	Sanchez Homestead	October 12, 2001 (#01001083)	7270 Old State Road 207; 29°44′16″N 81°28′43″W	Elkton	
47	Sanchez Powder House Site	Sanchez Powder House Site	April 14, 1972 (#72001461)	Marine St. 29°52′53″N 81°18′29″W	St. Augustine	
48	Second Fort Mose Site	Second Fort Mose Site	October 12, 1994 (#94001645)	Address Restricted; 29°55′40″N 81°19′31″W	St. Augustine	First free African settlement in the United States
49	Shell Bluff Landing (8SJ32)		April 25, 1991 (#91000455)	Address Restricted	Ponte Vedra Beach	
50	Solla-Carcaba Cigar Factory	Solla-Carcaba Cigar Factory	May 6, 1993 (#93000374)	88 Riberia St. 29°53′27″N 81°19′08″W	St. Augustine	
51	Spanish Coquina Quarries	Spanish Coquina Quarries	February 23, 1972 (#72001462)	State Road A1A in Anastasia State Park; 29°52′14″N 81°16′31″W	St. Augustine Beach	
52	Stanbury Cottage	Stanbury Cottage	October 8, 2008 (#08000966)	232 St. George Street; 29°53′27″N 81°18′44″W	St. Augustine	
53	Storm Wreck		October 2, 2017 (#100001671)	Address Restricted	St. Augustine vicinity	
54	Villa Zorayda	Villa Zorayda	September 23, 1993 (#93001002)	83 King St. 29°53′27″N 81°18′53″W	St. Augustine	
55	Horace Walker House	Horace Walker House	January 30, 1998 (#98000026)	33 Old Mission Ave. 29°54′12″N 81°19′14″W	St. Augustine	
56	Ximenez-Fatio House	Ximenez-Fatio House	July 25, 1973 (#73002135)	20 Aviles St. 29°53′28″N 81°18′41″W	St. Augustine	

== Former listing ==
	Name on the Register	Image	Date listed	Date removed	Location	City or town	Description
1	Hastings Community Center	Hastings Community Center	February 21, 2007 (#07000057)	August 22, 2023	401 N. Main St. 29°43′06″N 81°30′31″W	Hastings	

== See also ==
- List of National Historic Landmarks in Florida
- National Register of Historic Places listings in Florida
