= Stansbury =

Stansbury may refer to:

== Places ==
- Stanbury, in West Yorkshire, England
- Stansbury, South Australia
- Stansbury Park, Utah, United States
  - Stansbury Island, adjacent in south Great Salt Lake
  - Stansbury Mountains, adjacent, south of Stansbury Island
- Stansbury Peninsula, in the South Shetland Islands

== Other uses ==
- Fort Stansbury, early 19th century, south of modern Tallahassee, Florida
- Stansbury (surname)
- Stansbury Hall (West Virginia University), a former building on the Downtown Campus of West Virginia University
- Stansbury High School, Stansbury Park, Utah
- Stansbury House (disambiguation)
- Stansbury v. California (1994), a U.S. Supreme Court case dealing with Miranda warnings
- USS Stansbury (DD-180), named after John Stansbury
- Stanbury Cottage, Florida, United States
