= Sanchez Homestead =

Historic house in Florida, United States

- U.S. National Register of Historic Places
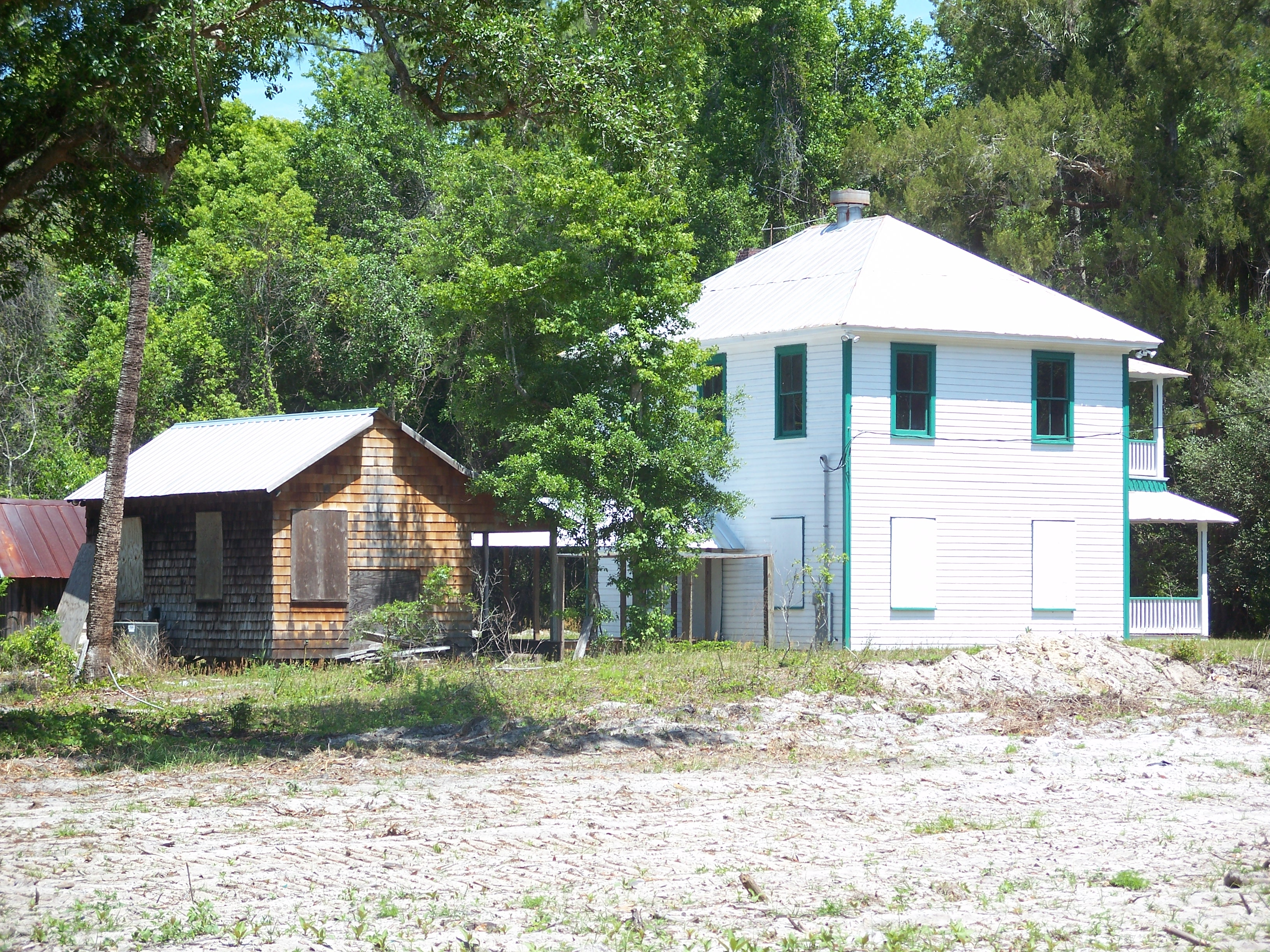

- Location within Florida Location within the United States
- Location: Spuds, Florida
- Coordinates: 29°44′16″N 81°28′43″W
- Architectural style: Frame Vernacular
- NRHP reference No.: 01001083
- Added to NRHP: October 12, 2001

The Sanchez Homestead is a historic site in Elkton, Florida, United States. It is located at 7270 Old State Road 207. It was added to the National Register of Historic Places in 2001.

== See also ==
- National Register of Historic Places listings in St. Johns County, Florida

== External links: county-specific links are broken April 2015 ==
- St. Johns County listings at National Register of Historic Places
- St. Johns County listings at Florida's Office of Cultural and Historical Programs

== Gallery ==
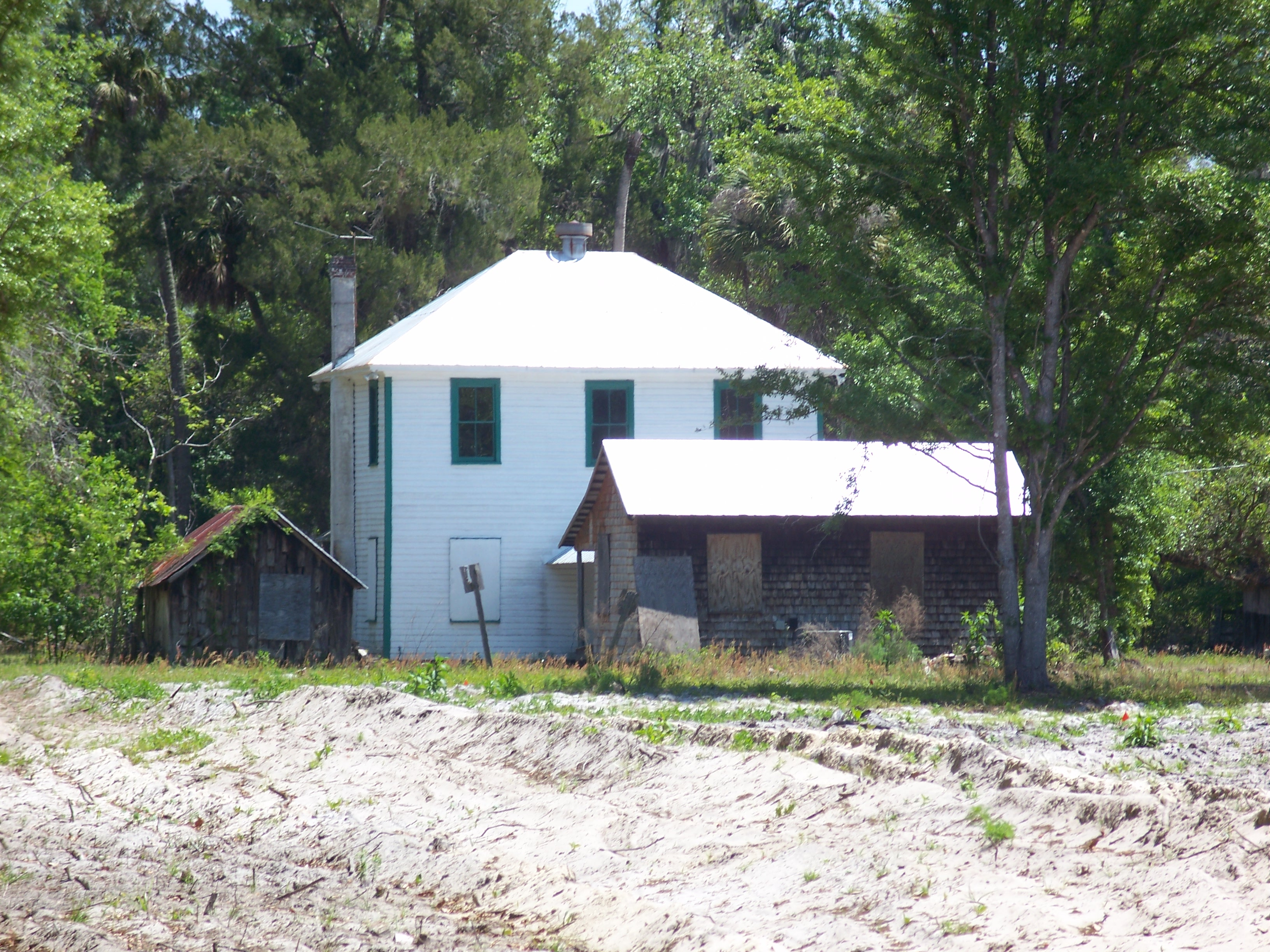

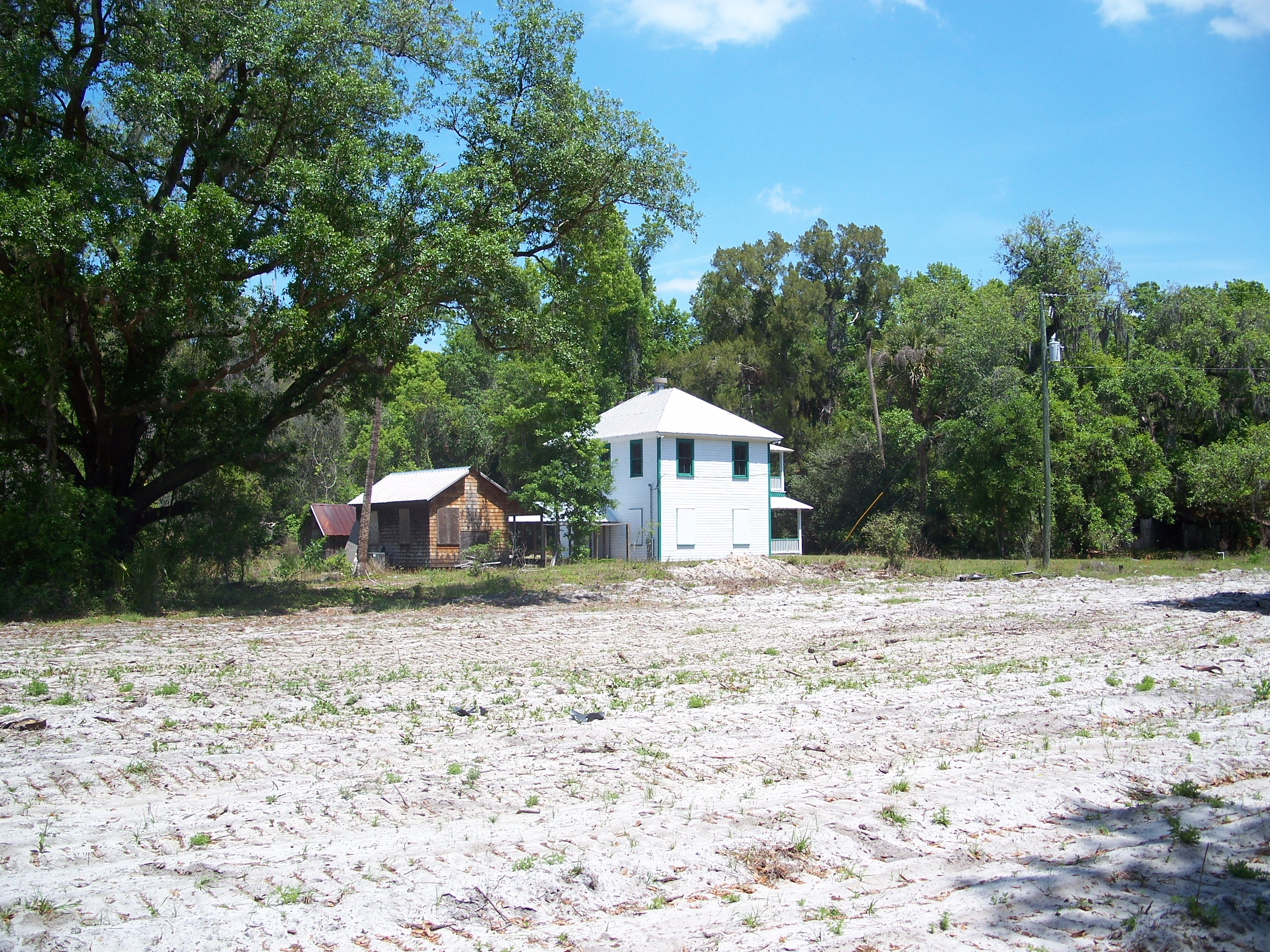

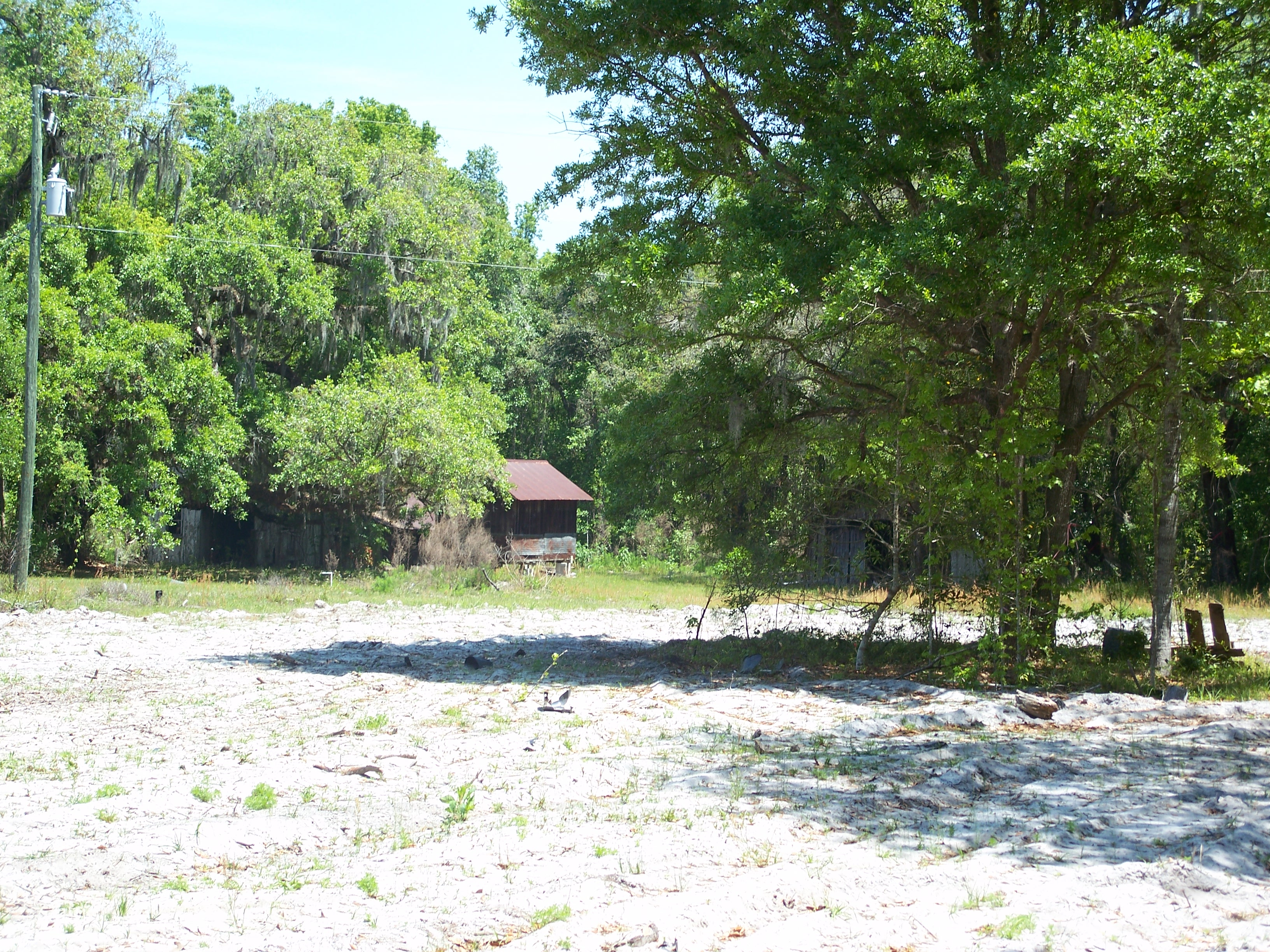
