= Sanchez Powder House Site =

- U.S. National Register of Historic Places
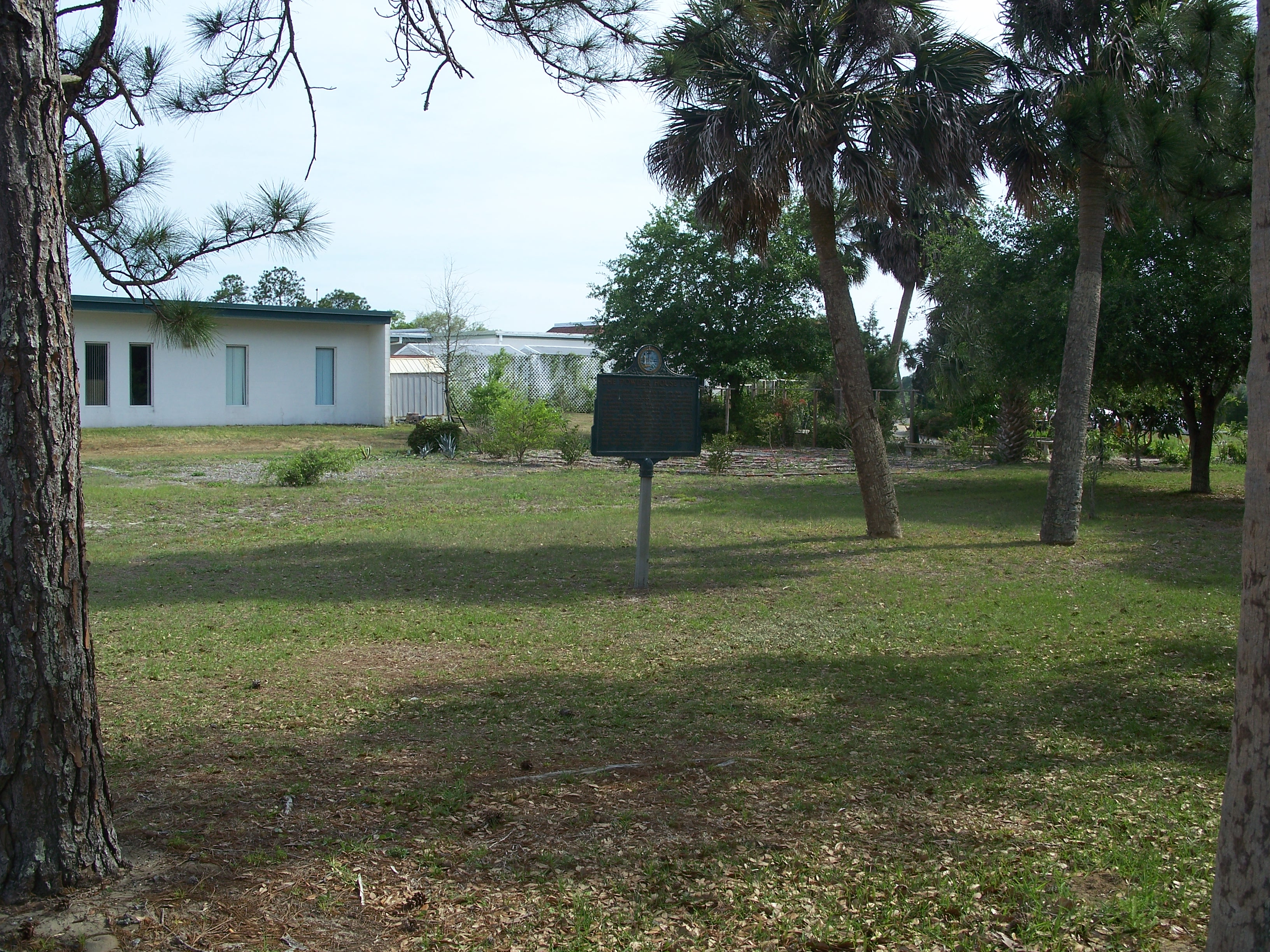

- Location within Florida Location within the United States
- Location: St. Augustine, Florida
- Coordinates: 29°52′53″N 81°18′29″W
- NRHP reference No.: 72001461
- Added to NRHP: April 14, 1972

The Sanchez Powder House Site (also known as Powder House Lot) is a historic site in St. Augustine, Florida. It is located on Marine Street. On April 14, 1972, it was added to the U.S. National Register of Historic Places.

== See also ==
- National Register of Historic Places listings in St. Johns County, Florida

== External links: county-specific links are broken April 2015 ==
- St. Johns County listings at National Register of Historic Places
- St. Johns County listings at Florida's Office of Cultural and Historical Programs
