= Horace Walker House =

Historic house in Florida, United States

- U.S. National Register of Historic Places
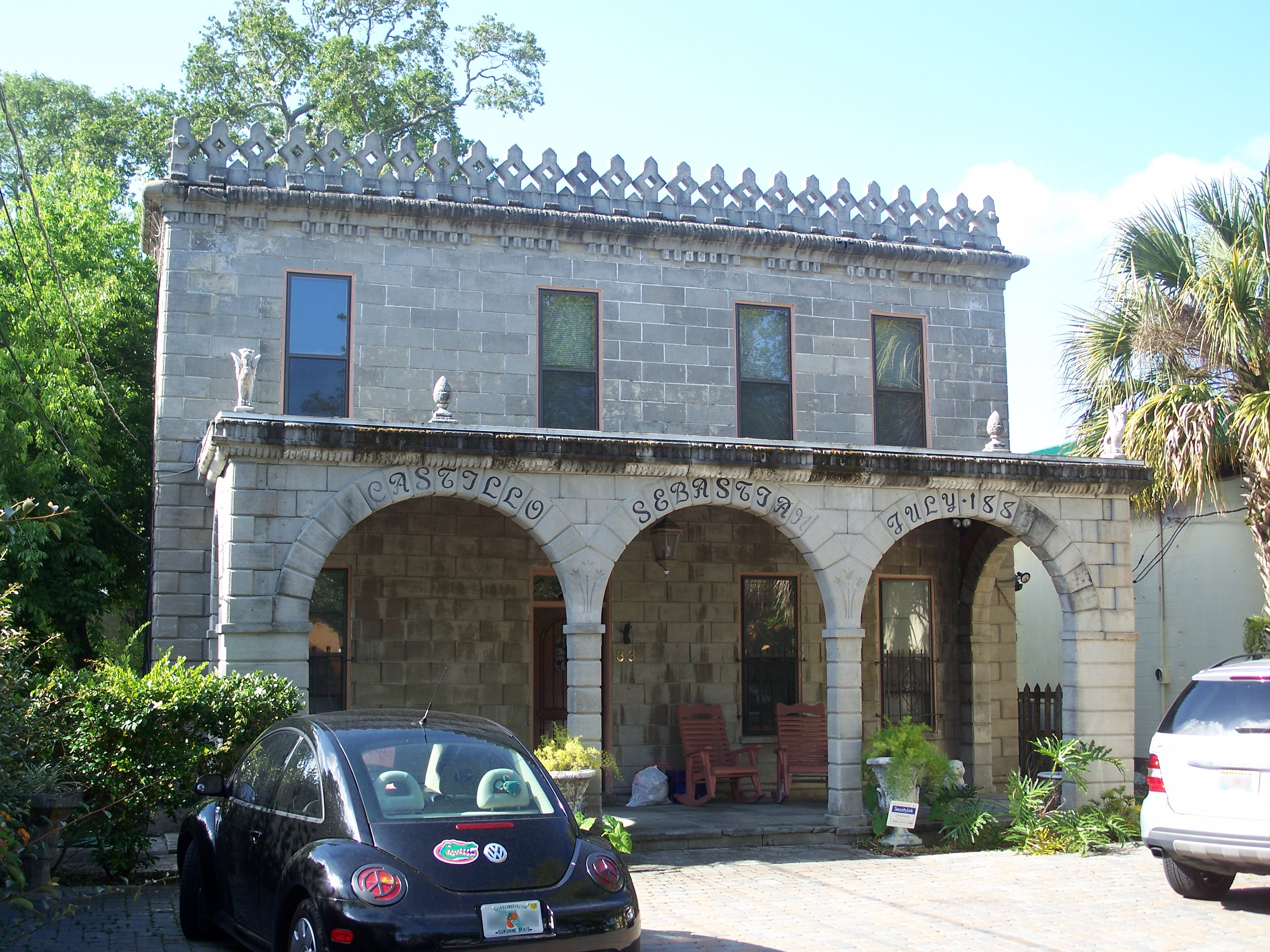

- Location within Florida Location within the United States
- Location: St. Augustine, Florida
- Coordinates: 29°54′12″N 81°19′14″W
- Area: 2,250 sq ft (209 m^{2})
- Architect: Franklin W. Smith
- Architectural style: Masonry Vernacular
- NRHP reference No.: 98000026
- Added to NRHP: January 30, 1998

The Horace Walker House, also known as Castillo Sebastian, is a historic home in St. Augustine, Florida built around 1888. It is located at 33 Old Mission Avenue, near the north city gate. On January 30, 1998, it was added to the U.S. National Register of Historic Places.

The house was erected using mold-formed concrete blocks, commonly called "artificial stone". Smith was the first to make concrete blocks that used crushed coquina instead of sand, along with Portland cement. In the late 19th century, this type of construction was new but the blocks used display the same characteristics: smooth/rough opposite surfaces, plus iron rods used for structural reinforcement.

The two-story, two bedroom, two bath house is one of St. Augustine's smallest examples of Moorish Revival architecture. The flat roof with decorative parapets are typical for the style; as is the front porch with five Tuscan arches—three facing the street. The interior is ornate, with heart of pine floors; the doors and ceilings feature carved wood. The central element is a double staircase with a landing between.
