= Xavier Lopez House =

Historic house in Florida, United States

- U.S. National Register of Historic Places
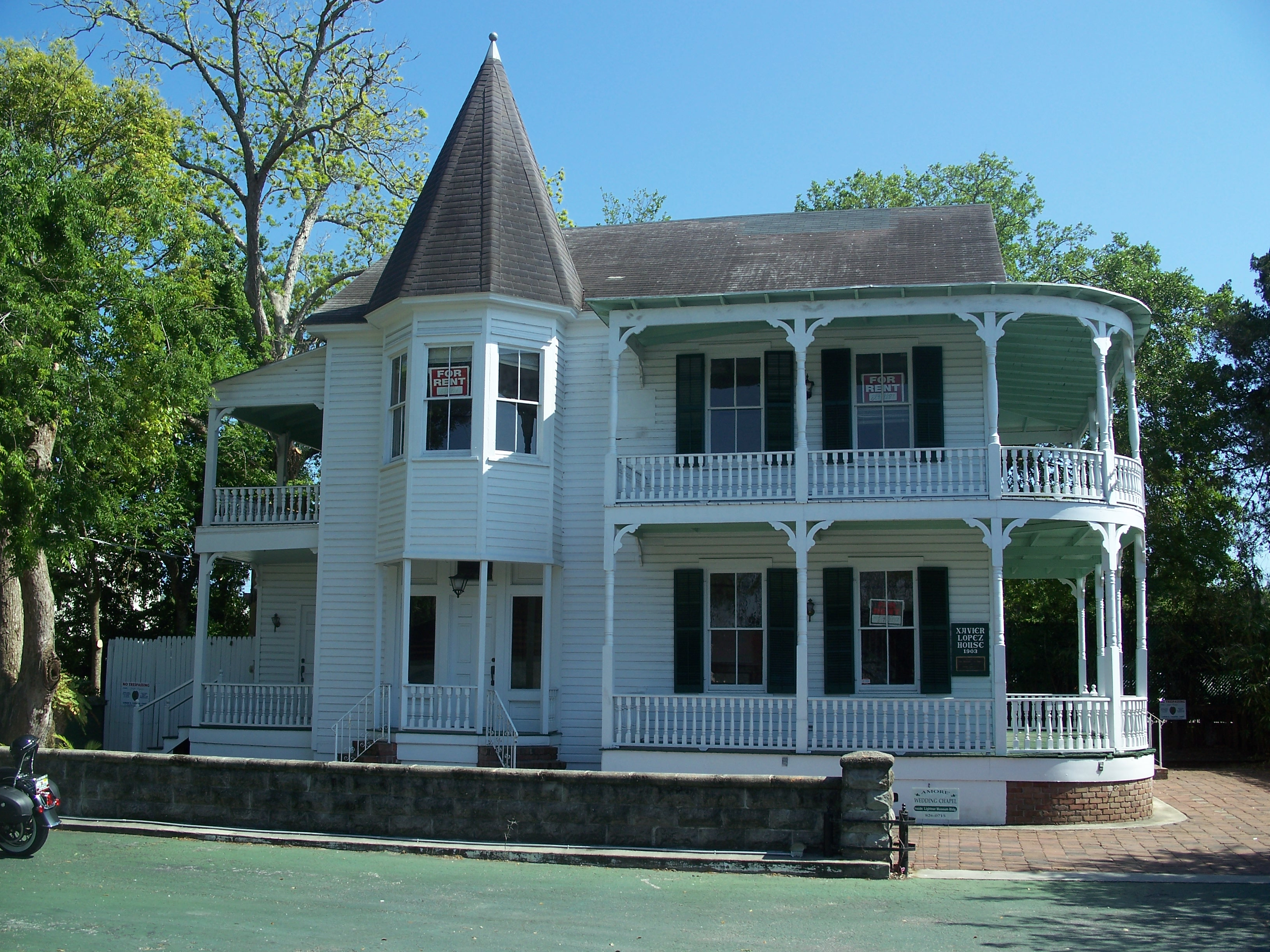

- Location within Florida Location within the United States
- Location: St. Augustine, Florida
- Coordinates: 29°53′29″N 81°18′58″W
- Built: 1903
- Architectural style: Queen Anne architecture
- NRHP reference No.: 93000579
- Added to NRHP: July 1, 1993

The Xavier Lopez House is a historic home in St. Augustine, Florida, United States. It is located at 93½ King Street (U.S. Business Route 1). It was built in 1903 in the Queen Anne/Victorian style, which is atypical of many structures in St. Augustine, most of which are in the Spanish/Mission Revival style. The house is located behind a trio of one-story Spanish colonial-style mortgage lending offices, all of which are addressed as being at 93 King Street.

In 1980, the house was restored by "The Mussallem Family" with help of a local construction company. On July 1, 1993, it was added to the U.S. National Register of Historic Places.

== Gallery ==
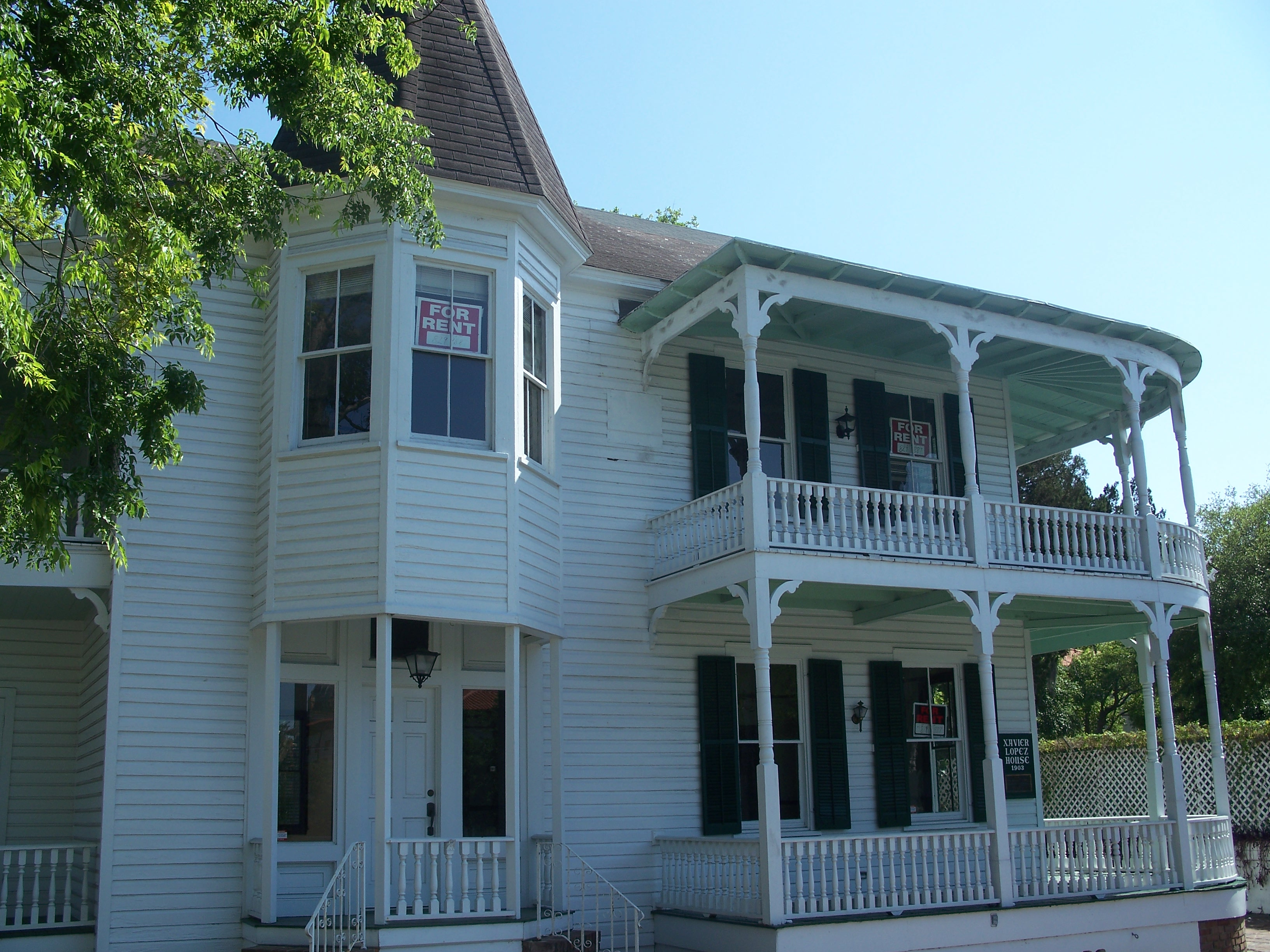

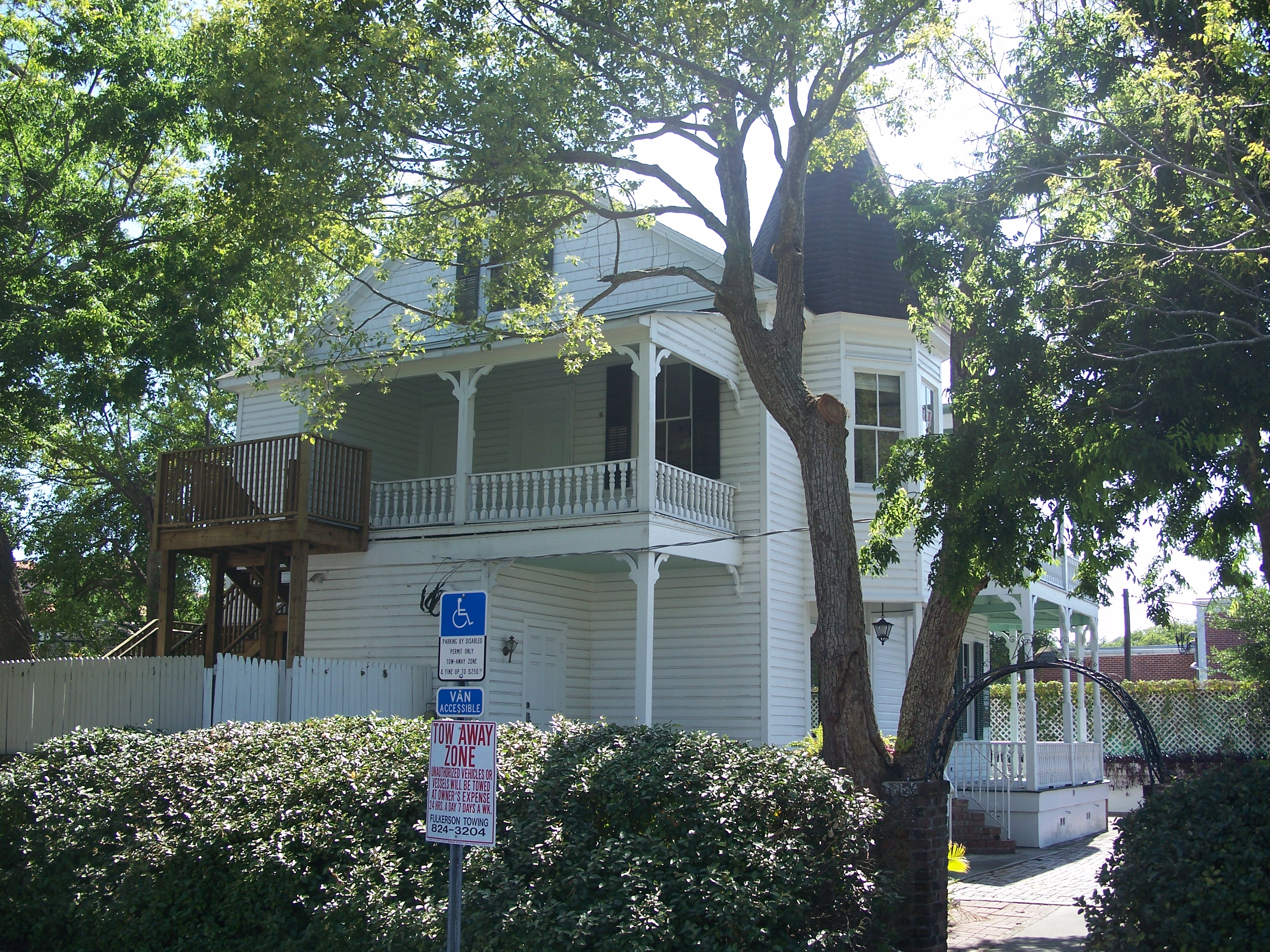

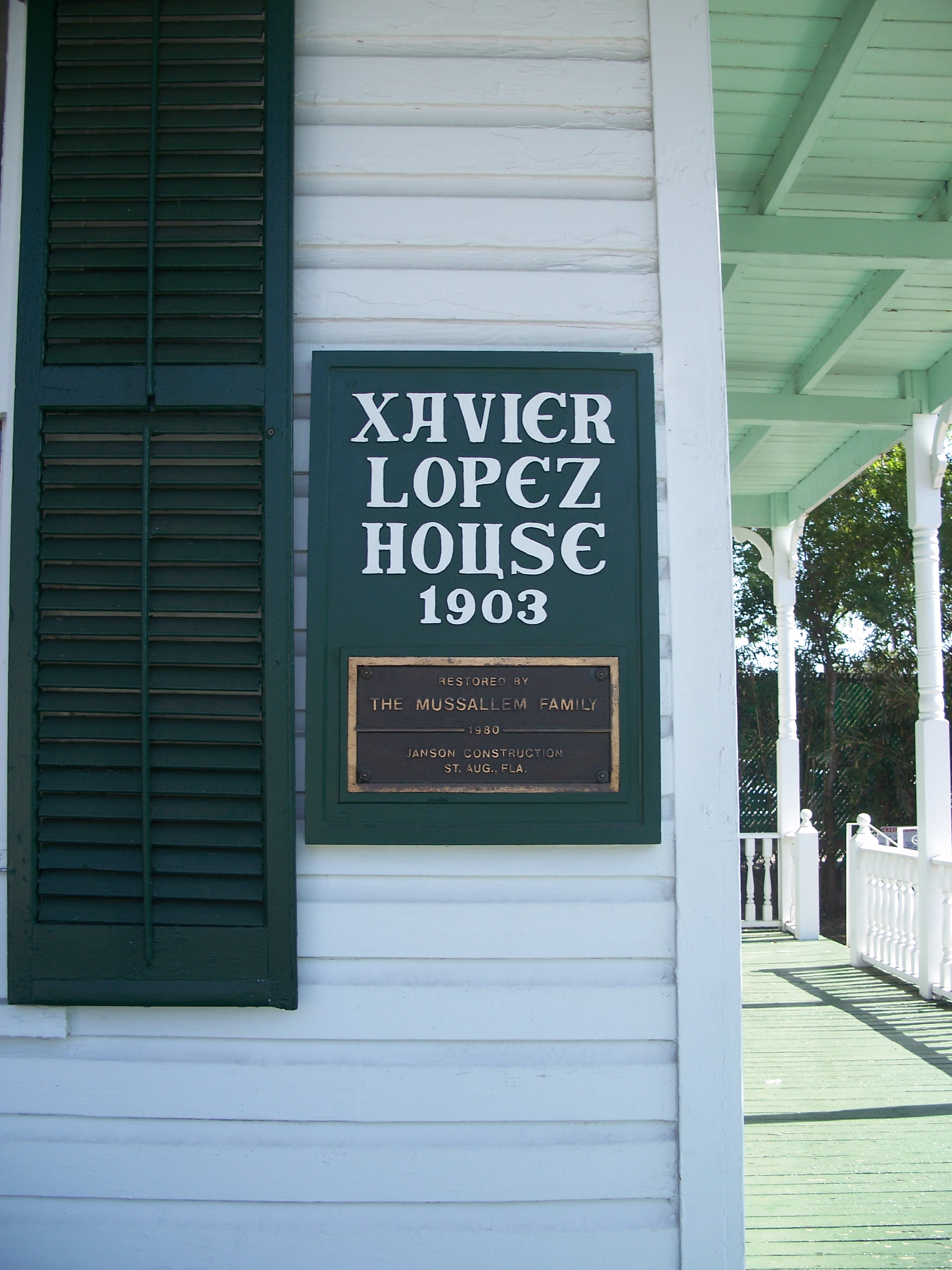
