= Record Building =

- U.S. National Register of Historic Places
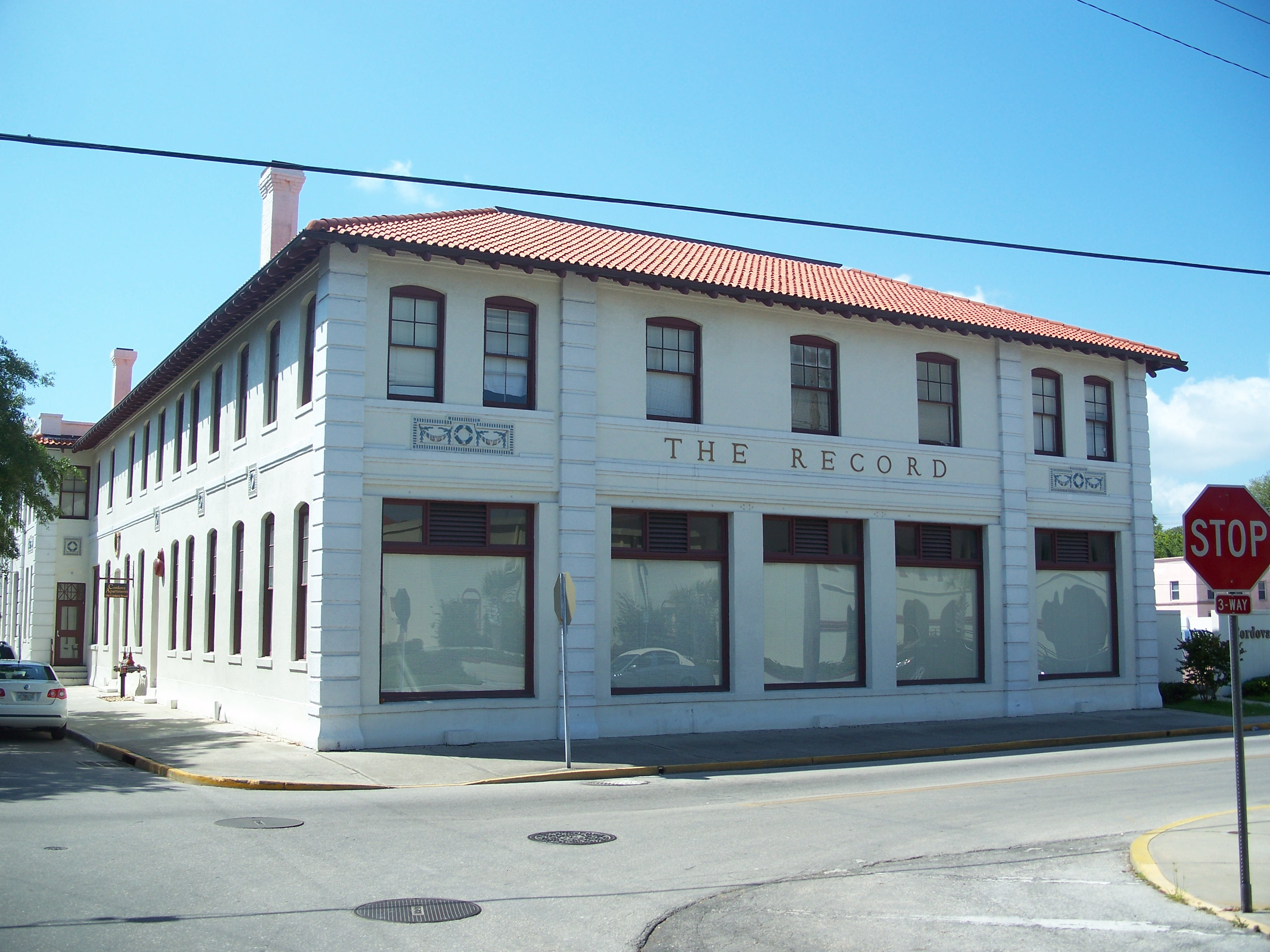

- Location within Florida Location within the United States
- Location: St. Augustine, Florida United States
- Coordinates: 29°53′20″N 81°18′47″W
- NRHP reference No.: 06000315
- Added to NRHP: April 26, 2006

The Record Building is a historic U.S. site in St. Augustine, Florida. It is located at 154 Cordova Street. On April 26, 2006, it was added to the U.S. National Register of Historic Places.
