= St. Augustine Water Works =

Historic place in Florida, United States

- U.S. National Register of Historic Places
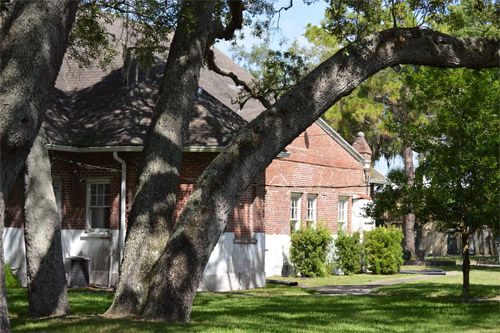

- Location within Florida Location within the United States
- Location: St. Augustine, Florida
- Coordinates: 29°54′38″N 81°19′14″W
- NRHP reference No.: 13001134
- Added to NRHP: February 5, 2014

St. Augustine Water Works is a national historic site located at 184 San Marco Avenue, St. Augustine, Florida in St. Johns County. Completed in 1898, in 1928 it was converted to a community center.

It was added to the National Register of Historic Places on February 5, 2014.
