= Shell Bluff Landing =

- U.S. National Register of Historic Places
- Location within Florida Location within the United States
- Location: St. Johns County, Florida, United States
- Nearest city: Ponte Vedra Beach, Florida
- Coordinates: 30°00′57″N 81°20′45″W
- NRHP reference No.: 91000455
- Added to NRHP: April 25, 1991

Shell Bluff Landing is a historic site in Ponte Vedra Beach, Florida, United States. It is part of Guana River State Park. On April 25, 1991, it was added to the U.S. National Register of Historic Places.
