= Hastings Community Center =

- Formerly listed on the U.S. National Register of Historic Places
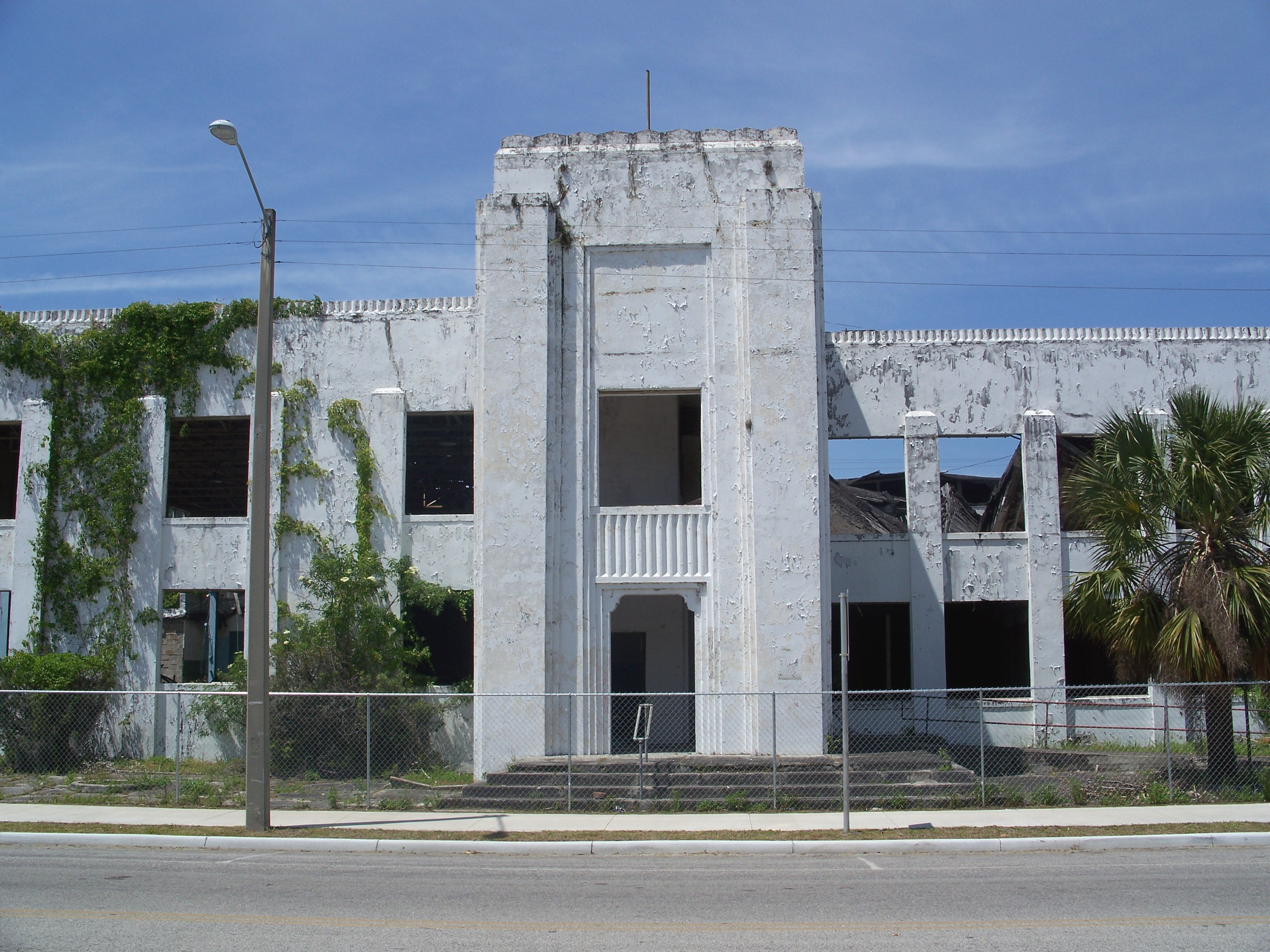

- Location within Florida Location within the United States
- Location: Hastings, Florida
- Coordinates: 29°43′6″N 81°30′31″W
- Built: 1937
- Demolished: 2019
- NRHP reference No.: 07000057

Significant dates
- Added to NRHP: February 21, 2007
- Removed from NRHP: August 22, 2023

The Hastings Community Center was a historic building in Hastings, Florida, United States. It was located at 401 N. Main Street. It was built in 1937 with a combination of local government and Works Progress Administration funding. The building included an auditorium and meeting halls and its uses included government offices, a library and fire department. Many civic and social groups including the American Legion and American Red Cross used the building for meetings and other events. On February 21, 2007, it was added to the U.S. National Register of Historic Places.

== State of Disrepair ==
When the town of Hastings was dissolved in 2018, any and all decisions were made by the St. Johns County Commission. St. Johns County building inspectors determined the structure was in very poor condition, and was potentially unsafe. The structure was in a bad state of disrepair as it was vacant and deteriorating. It was devoid of most of its windows, and was suffering from severe roof failure. St. Johns County officials cited the building's dilapidated condition and the cost to preserve it (estimated in the millions of dollars) as the reasons to order its demolition.

== Demolition ==
On January 28, 2019, St. Johns County, Florida issued Demolition Permit number 11900992. The Hastings Community Center was demolished in 2019 by the Peter Jerome Burkhalter contractor firm from Jacksonville.

== Delisting from the National Register of Historic Places ==
In October 2022, a petition to delist the Hastings Community Center from the National Register of Historic Places was sent to the Florida Department of Historic Resources.

== Gallery ==
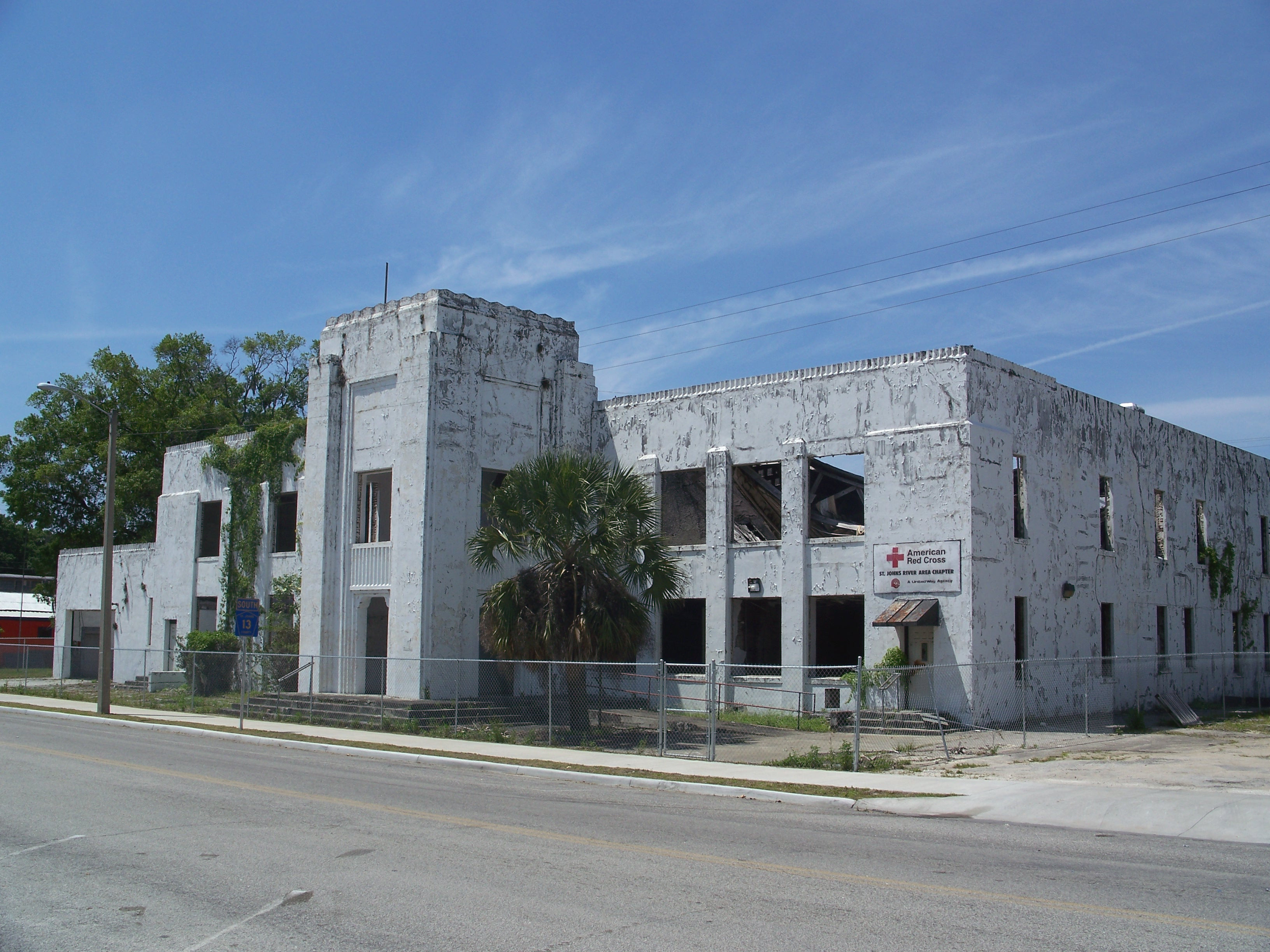

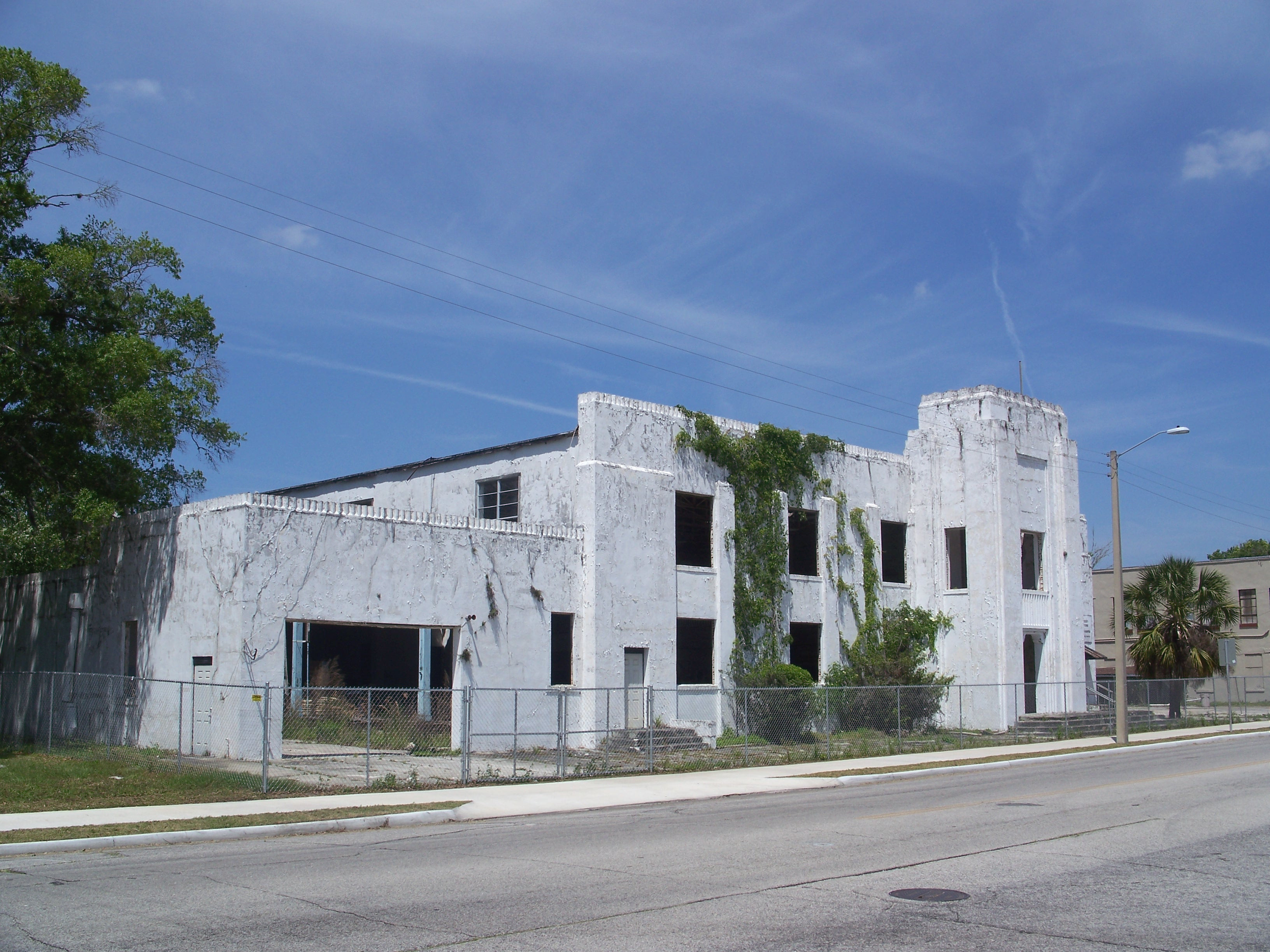
