= Fullerwood Park Residential Historic District =

Historic district in Florida, United States

- U.S. National Register of Historic Places
- U.S. Historic district
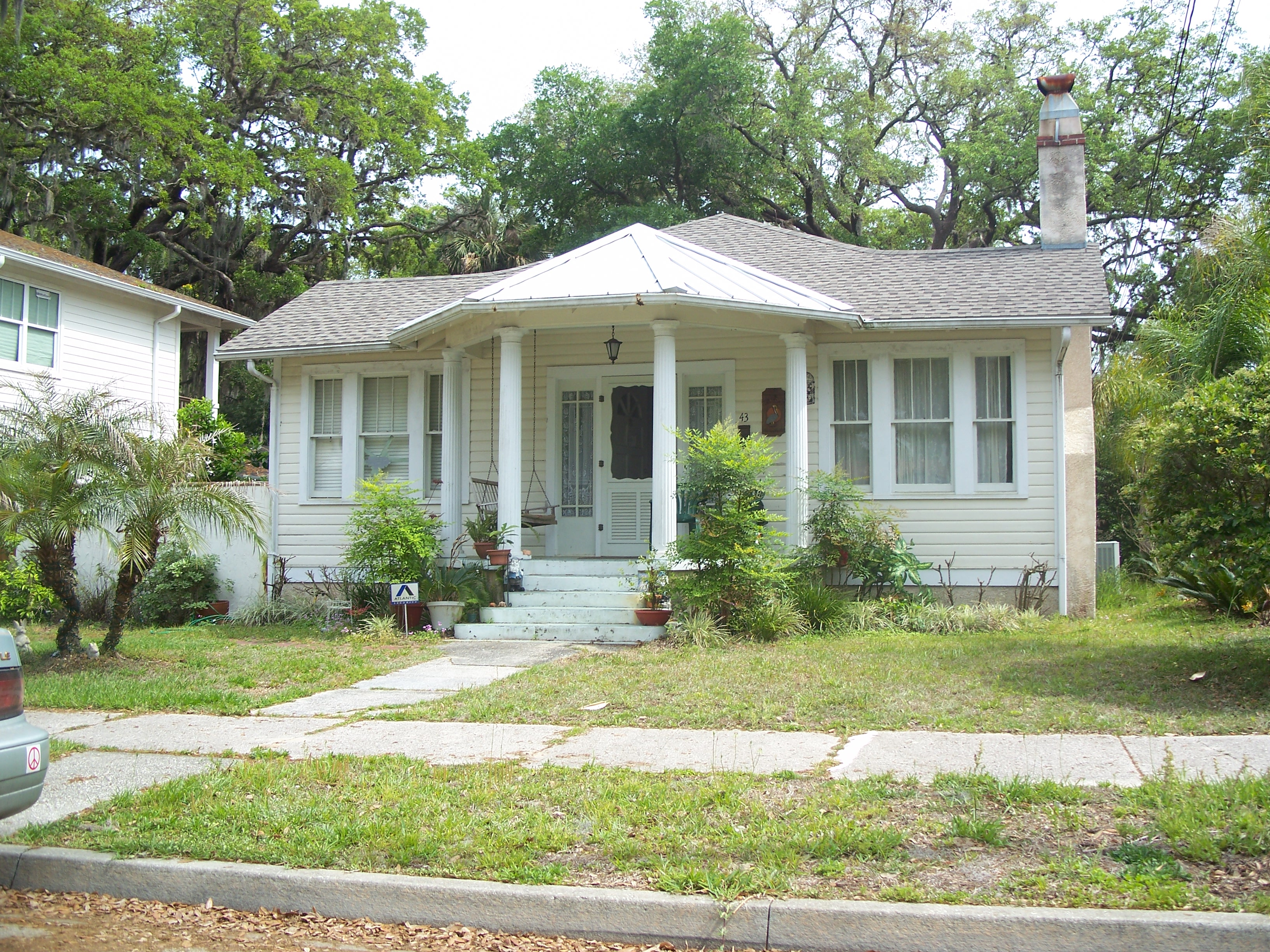
- House in the district

- Location within Florida Location within the United States
- Location: St. Augustine, Florida
- Coordinates: 29°54′59″N 81°19′14″W
- NRHP reference No.: 10000767
- Added to NRHP: September 24, 2010

The Fullerwood Park Residential Historic District is a U.S. historic district in St. Augustine, Florida.

== Overview ==
The district is roughly bounded on the north by Hildreth Drive, the south by Macaris Street, the west by San Marco Avenue and east by Hospital Creek.

It was added to the National Register of Historic Places on September 24, 2010.
