= Nelmar Terrace Historic District =

Historic district in Florida, United States

- U.S. National Register of Historic Places
- U.S. Historic district
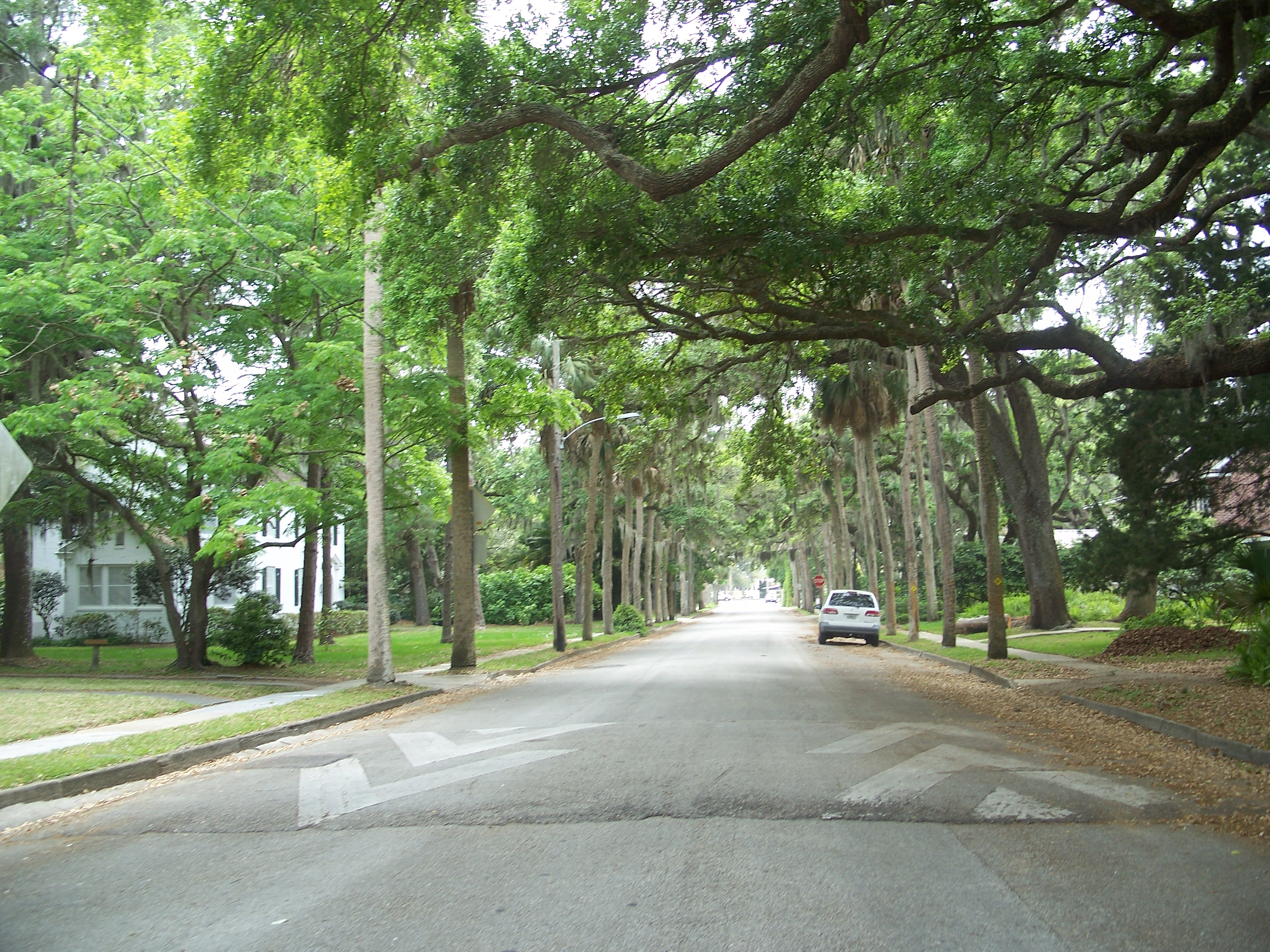
- Road in the district

- Location within Florida Location within the United States
- Location: St. Augustine, Florida
- Coordinates: 29°54′39″N 81°19′06″W
- NRHP reference No.: 11000145
- Added to NRHP: March 28, 2011

The Nelmar Terrace Historic District is a U.S. historic district in St. Augustine, Florida. The district is roughly bounded by Hospital Creek on the east, San Marco Ave. on the west, San Carlos Ave. on the south and Milton and Alfred streets on the north. Named after Daniel Nelmar.

It was added to the National Register of Historic Places on March 28, 2011.
