= Model Land Company Historic District =

Historic district in Florida, United States

- U.S. National Register of Historic Places
- U.S. Historic district
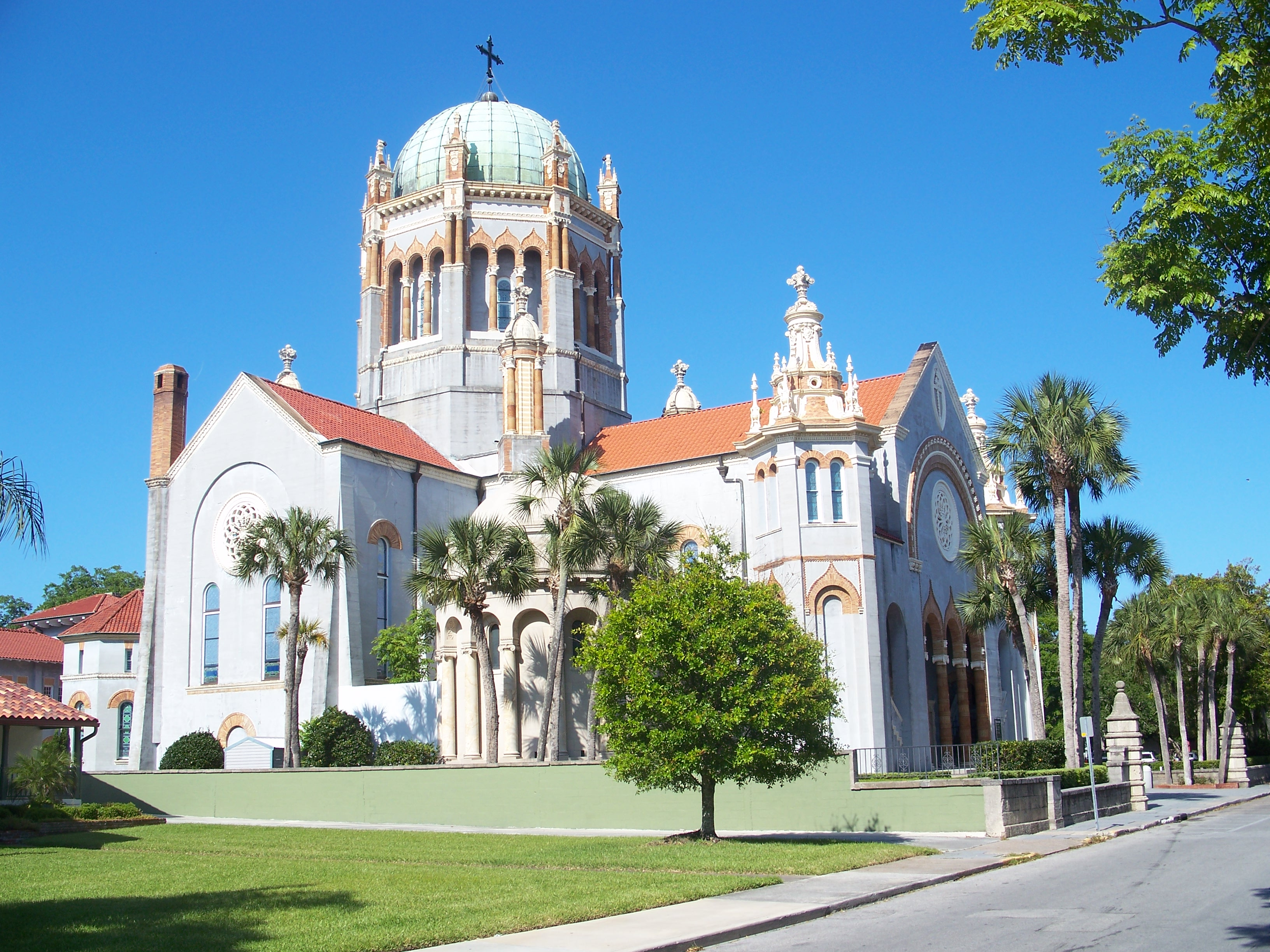
- Flagler Memorial Presbyterian Church, in the district

- Location within Florida Location within the United States
- Location: St. Augustine, Florida
- Coordinates: 29°53′39″N 81°19′6″W
- Area: 1,100 acres (4.5 km^{2})
- NRHP reference No.: 83001439
- Added to NRHP: August 2, 1983

The Model Land Company Historic District is a U.S. historic district (designated as such on August 2, 1983) located in St. Augustine, Florida. The district is bounded by Ponce de Leon Boulevard, King, Cordova, and Orange Streets. It contains 238 historic buildings.
