= Abbott Tract Historic District =

Historic district in Florida, United States

- U.S. National Register of Historic Places
- U.S. Historic district
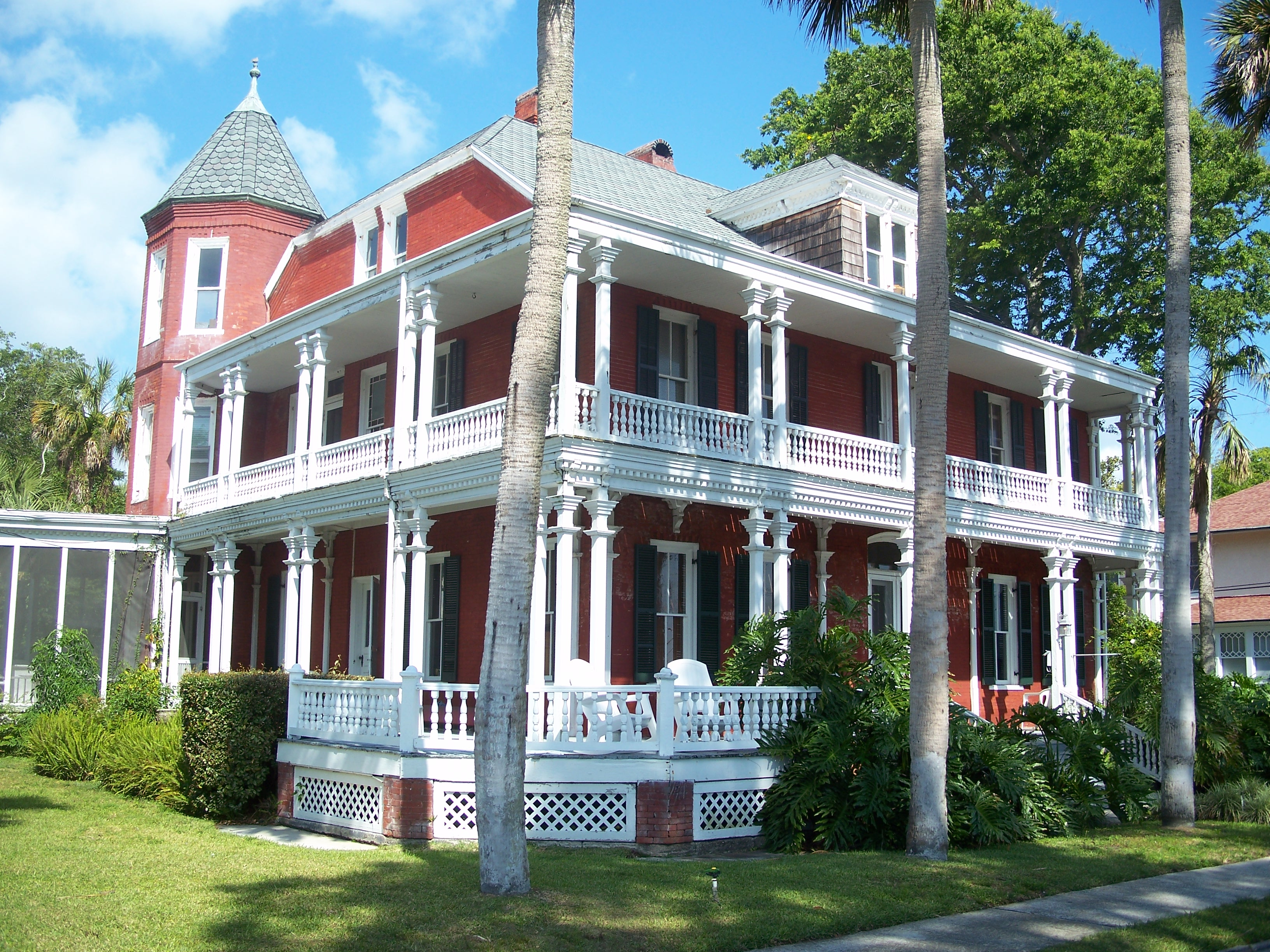
- House in the district

- Location within Florida Location within the United States
- Location: Roughly bounded by Matanza's Bay, Pine, San Marco, and Shenandoah Aves., St. Augustine, Florida
- Coordinates: 29°54′4″N 81°18′50″W
- Area: 33 acres (13 ha)
- Architect: Multiple
- Architectural style: Mixed (more Than 2 Styles From Different Periods)
- NRHP reference No.: 83001438
- Added to NRHP: July 21, 1983

The Abbott Tract Historic District is a 33 acres (13 ha) historic district in St. Augustine, Florida. It is bounded by Matanzas Bay, Pine, San Marco, and Shenandoah Avenues. On July 21, 1983, it was added to the U.S. National Register of Historic Places. It contains 124 contributing buildings.

It is a 17 block area.

The Abbott Tract is a section of historic St. Augustine that dates to 1860 when Lucy Abbott, a young woman in her 20s, arrived in St. Augustine. She began purchasing land north of the Castillo de San Marcos, and by the 1870s, the astute businesswoman owned a large tract of land north of the city. She built nine structures in the area which still stand — the first house dates from 1861 and the last several from between 1885 and 1894. The Abbott Tract saw rapid development until 1904 when 126 houses lined the streets. The area's development was primarily conceived, designed and developed for residential use.
