= North City Historic District =

Historic district in Florida, United States

- U.S. National Register of Historic Places
- U.S. Historic district
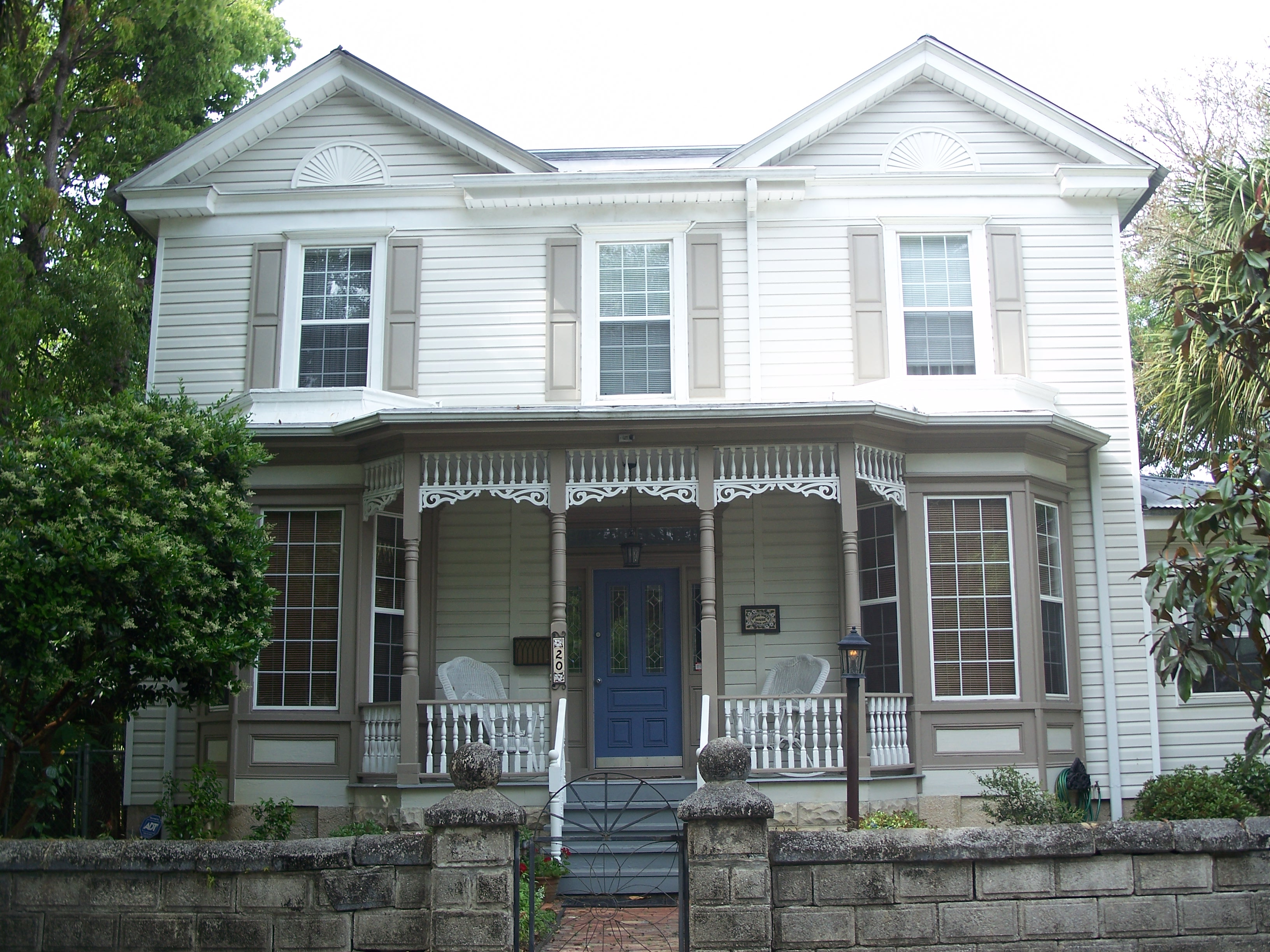
- House in the district

- Location within Florida Location within the United States
- Location: St. Augustine, Florida
- Coordinates: 29°54′07″N 81°19′05″W
- NRHP reference No.: 09000778
- Added to NRHP: October 1, 2009

The North City Historic District is a U.S. historic district in St. Augustine, Florida. The district is bordered by Castillo Dr. north to Old Mission Ave., N. Ponce de Leon Blvd. on the west and San Marco Avenue on the east.

It was added to the National Register of Historic Places on October 1, 2009.
