= Moultrie Church =

Historic church in St. Augustine Florida

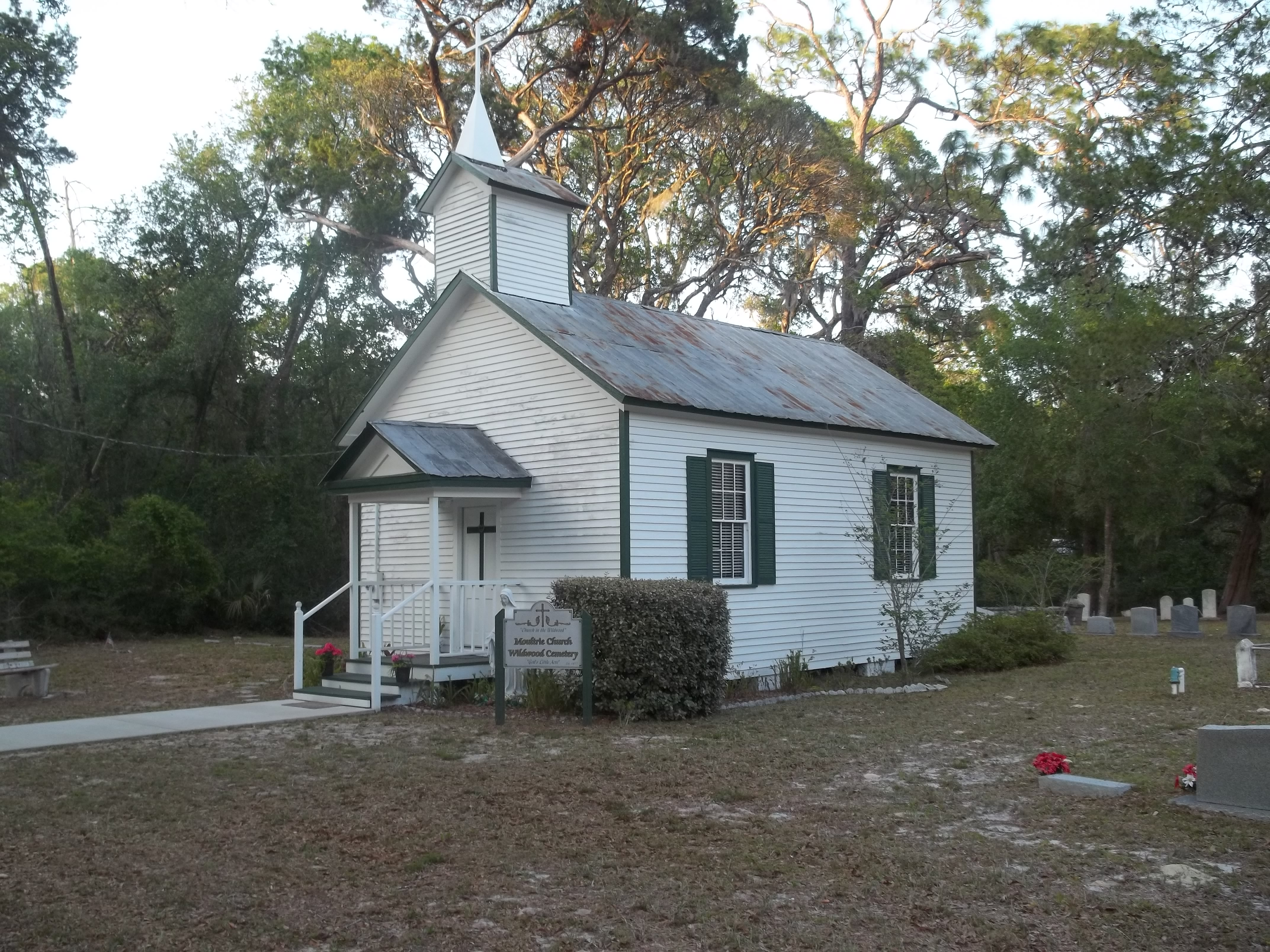
- Moultrie Church St. Augustine, Florida
- Former names: St. Mary's by the Sea
- Alternative names: Wildwood church

General information
- Type: Church
- Location: St. Johns County, Florida
- Address: 480 Wildwood Dr., St. Augustine
- Country: United States
- Coordinates: 29.815278°N 81.335833°W
- Opened: 1877

Technical details
- Material: Wood with steel roof

U.S. National Register of Historic Places
- Designated: JuneSeptember 8, 2014
- Reference no.: #14000553

Moultrie Church (1877) is a historic church in St. Johns County, Florida. The church is listed in the National Register of Historic Places.

== History ==
The small church was built in 1877 and is surrounded by marked and unmarked graves of fallen soldiers. The church was originally founded by Southern Methodists in St. Augustine. It once had the name Wildwood Church. For many years the church was vacant, but in 2014, it was called St. Mary's by the Sea. It was part of the Polish National Catholic Church. The PNCC.

The caretakers of the church are Anthony Hagen and Chrissy Hope.

The church was added to the National Register of Historic Places on September 8, 2014.
