= Stansbury House =

Stansbury House may refer to:

- Stansbury House (Chico, California), listed on the National Register of Historic Places in Butte County, California
- Zack Stansbury House, Mt. Washington, Kentucky, listed on the National Register of Historic Places in Bullitt County, Kentucky
