= Stansbury Peninsula =

Peninsula on Nelson Island, South Shetland Islands

Stansbury Peninsula (62°14′24″S 58°59′51″W) is an ice-free peninsula on the north coast of Nelson Island between Edgell Bay and Fildes Strait, in the South Shetland Islands. Named by the United Kingdom Antarctic Place-Names Committee (UK-APC) following British Antarctic Survey (BAS) geological work, 1975–76, after Michael J. Stansbury, Falkland Islands Dependencies Survey (FIDS) meteorologist at Grytviken, 1958–59, and Base Leader at Admiralty Bay, 1959–60. A later Polish Antarctic Expedition called this feature "Wzgorze Helikoptera" or "Helicopter Hills" in reference to successful helicopter landings in the 1980–81 season.
