= Stanbury Cottage =

Historic house in Florida, United States

- U.S. National Register of Historic Places
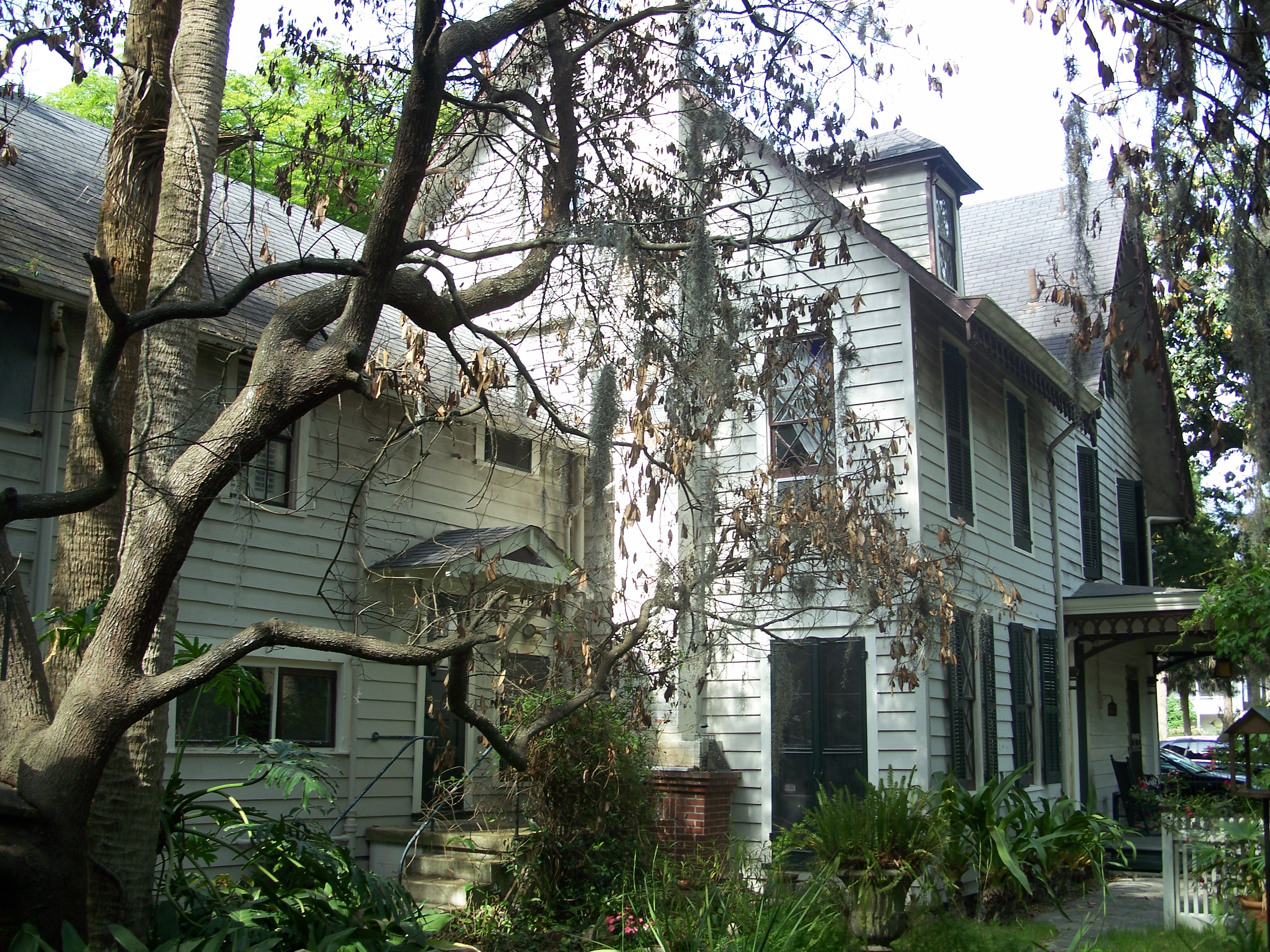

- Location within Florida Location within the United States
- Location: St. Augustine, Florida, USA
- Coordinates: 29°53′26.52″N 81°18′44.46″W
- Built: c. 1840
- Architectural style: Gothic Revival/Carpenter Gothic
- Part of: St. Augustine Town Plan Historic District (ID70000847)
- NRHP reference No.: 08000966
- Added to NRHP: October 8, 2008

Stanbury Cottage is a historic building at 232 St. George Street in St. Augustine, Florida. It is part of the St. Augustine Town Plan Historic District. On October 8, 2008, it was added to the U.S. National Register of Historic Places. Stanbury Cottage is one of the oldest examples of Carpenter Gothic architecture in Florida. The house has historic connections to Henry Flagler, Andrew Anderson, and Martin J. Heade who were often guests of the Stanburys.
