= Gómez House (St. Augustine) =

- Gomez House
- U.S. Historic district – Contributing property
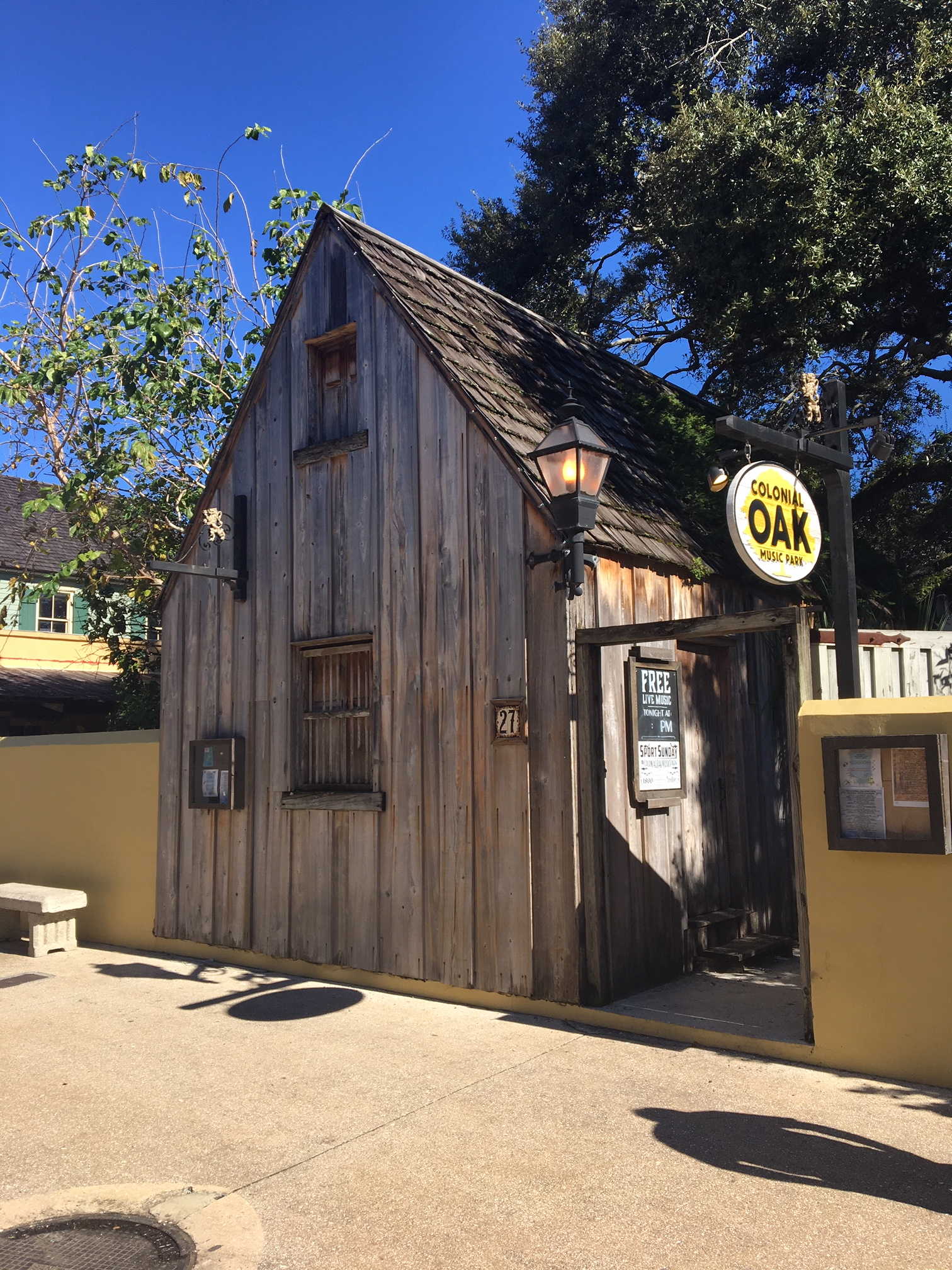
- Gomez House, 2018

- Location within Florida
- Location: 27 St. George St; St. Augustine, Florida
- Coordinates: 29°54′54″N 81°18′44″W
- Built: 1969
- Architectural style: Spanish Colonial
- Part of: St. Augustine Town Plan Historic District (ID70000847)

The Gómez House, located at 27 St. George Street in St. Augustine, Florida, is a reconstruction of a simple wooden house dating back to Florida’s First Spanish Period (1565-1763).

== History ==
A 1764 Spanish map describes the structure at this site as a “house of boards” owned by Lorenzo Gómez, who had a wife, Catarina Perdomo, and three children. There is no documentation for when the house was originally built or who the former owner was. The home originally contained two rooms and a sleeping loft. A coquina walled well in the yard was the water source for the family.

Lorenzo and his family moved to Havana in 1763 following the British occupation of East Florida. The house was left in the charge of British agent Jesse Fish and eventually torn down in St. Augustine’s British Period, most likely for firewood. The site remained empty until the first half of the 19th century.

== Historic St. Augustine Preservation Board ==
The Gómez House was reconstructed in 1969 by the Historic St. Augustine Preservation Board.

The sides of the house were wide wooden vertical boards. The roof was reconstructed with hand split cypress shingles, the Preservation Board conducting public demonstrations of shingle splitting. The windows were built with wooden shutters.

== San Agustín Antiguo ==
The Gómez House was incorporated into the city of St. Augustine's living history museum, known as San Agustín Antiguo. It provided a good example of board and batten construction commonly used in the 18th century and was meant to show a typical home of a foot soldier (Lorenzo Gómez) and his family. This type and size of house could be contrasted with that of an artilleryman’s house; a reconstruction of artilleryman Gallegos's house, had been built nearby. Note the proximity of both houses to St. Augustine's fort, the Castillo de San Marcos.

In addition, the Gómez House displayed a home which was also put to use as a tienda. It was a house that was also used as a store. During the age of San Agustín Antiguo, the Gómez House displayed reproduction goods and barrels.

== Present Day ==
Today the Gómez House is owned by the state of Florida and managed on its behalf by University of Florida Historic St. Augustine, Inc. It operates as part of the Colonial Quarter complex, located at the entrance to the Colonial Oak Music Park.
