= Historic St. Augustine Preservation Board =

Florida state agency (1959–1997)

The Historic St. Augustine Preservation Board
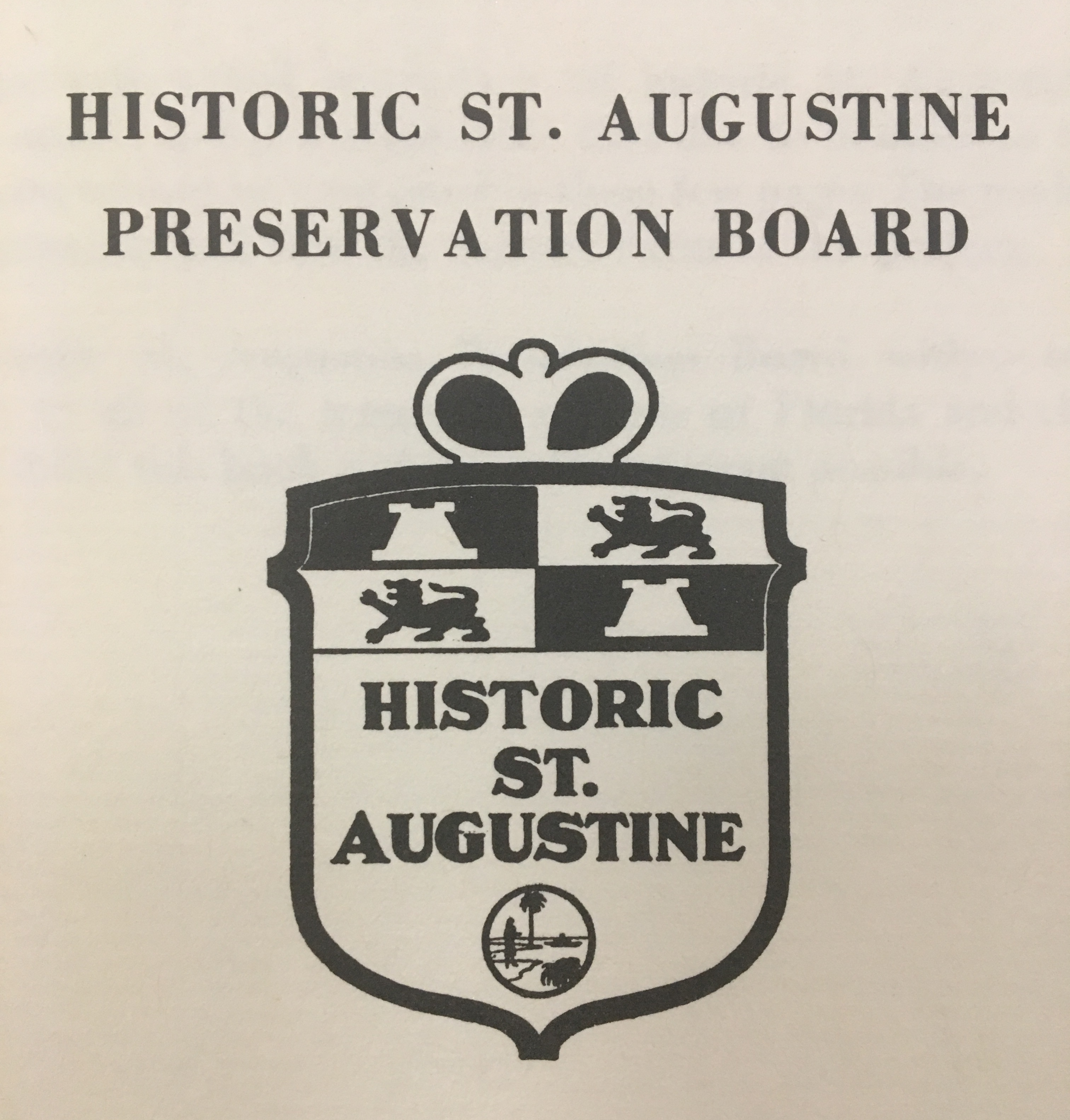
- HSAPB logo

Florida state agency overview
- Formed: March 1958
- Dissolved: June 1997
- Jurisdiction: St. Augustine, Florida, United States
- Headquarters: St. Augustine, Florida

The Historic St. Augustine Preservation Board (HSAPB) was a state agency in Florida that participated in the restoration and preservation of historic buildings in St. Augustine, Florida from 1959 to 1997. Created in 1959 by Governor LeRoy Collins, the agency acquired, restored, and preserved historic structures in St. Augustine until its abolishment by the State of Florida in June 1997.

== History ==
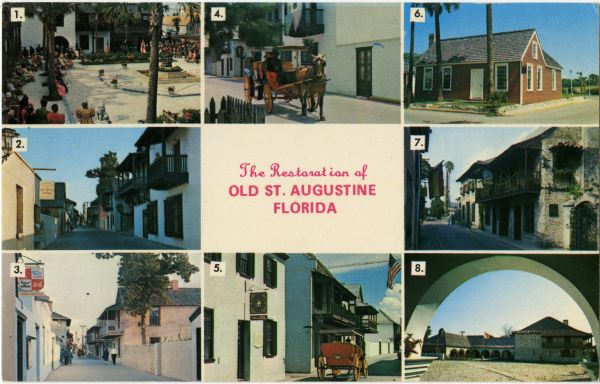
St. Augustine postcard

In March 1958 a group from St. Augustine asked Florida Governor LeRoy Collins for the creation of a historic preservation program for the city's historic downtown. On June 11, 1959, House Bill 774 was signed into law, establishing the St. Augustine Historical Restoration and Preservation Commission and giving it $150,000 of state funds to begin its work. Original members of the Commission were Herbert E. Wolfe, Leonard Usina, William F. Rolleston, William L. Sims II, and Henrietta Poynter. Wolfe, a resident of St. Augustine, was the Commission's first chairman, serving from 1959 until 1969. The Commission hired consultant Earle Newton to help it develop a strategic plan for the restoration and preservation of St. Augustine buildings. At its founding, the agency's primary objective was to restore the colonial architecture of St. Augustine in time for the city's Quadricentennial Celebration in 1965. Buildings the agency planned to restore dated to the First Spanish Period (1565–1763), British Period (1763–1783), Second Spanish Period (1783–1821), and the early American Period (after 1821). Senator Verle Pope and Representatives Charlie Usina and Gus Craig strongly supported the restoration program and fought for another $300,000 to further its work.

The Commission's first restoration project was the Arrivas House on St. George Street, which was dedicated by then-Vice President Lyndon B. Johnson on March 11, 1963. The Commission used the second floor of the Arrivas House as their administrative offices until 1970, when they moved operations to the Government House. On May 5, 1970 the St. Augustine Historical Restoration and Preservation Commission was renamed to the Historic St. Augustine Preservation Board. In June 1997 the agency was abolished by the State of Florida in accordance with the Sundown Act. Management of the agency's properties was first tasked to the City of St. Augustine and subsequently to UF Historic St. Augustine, Inc. (UFHSA), a direct support organization of the University of Florida.

== San Agustín Antiguo ==
In 1963 the HSAPB opened San Agustín Antiguo, a living history museum village in which costumed guides gave tours of restored buildings and demonstrated a variety of arts and crafts typical of the First and Second Spanish Periods, as well as of the British Period. These included blacksmithing, weaving, printing, candle dipping, silversmithing, pottery, baking, and leather making. After the dissolution of the HSAPB, a smaller version of San Agustín Antiguo was kept in operation by UF Historic St. Augustine, Inc.

== Structure ==
The HSAPB was managed by a seven-member board of directors, the head of which was the Chairman. Chairmen of the board included Lawrence Lewis, Jr. (1969–1972), John D. Bailey (1972–1975), Michael V. Gannon (1975–1980, 1985–1987), Henry W. McMillan (1980–1985), Bill Daniell (1987–1989), John Sundeman (1989–1990), and Bill Rose (1991–1997).

== List of restoration and reconstruction projects ==
The following properties in St. Augustine were at one point restored or reconstructed by the HSAPB:

- Arrivas House
- Benet House
- Benet Store
- Blacksmith Shop
- Cerveau House
- Coquina Warehouse
- De Mesa Sánchez House
- De Hita House/Gonzáles House
- Florencia House
- Florida Heritage House
- Gallegos House
- Gómez House
- Haas House
- Harness Shop
- Joaneda House
- Pellicer/De Burgo House
- Ribera House
- Rodríguez House
- Salcedo House
- Salcedo Kitchen
- Sánchez de Ortigosa House
- Sims Silversmith Shop
- Spanish Military Hospital
- Triay House
- Watson House
- Wells Print Shop

== See also ==
- Historic preservation
