= Pellicer-De Burgo House =

- U.S. Historic district – Contributing property
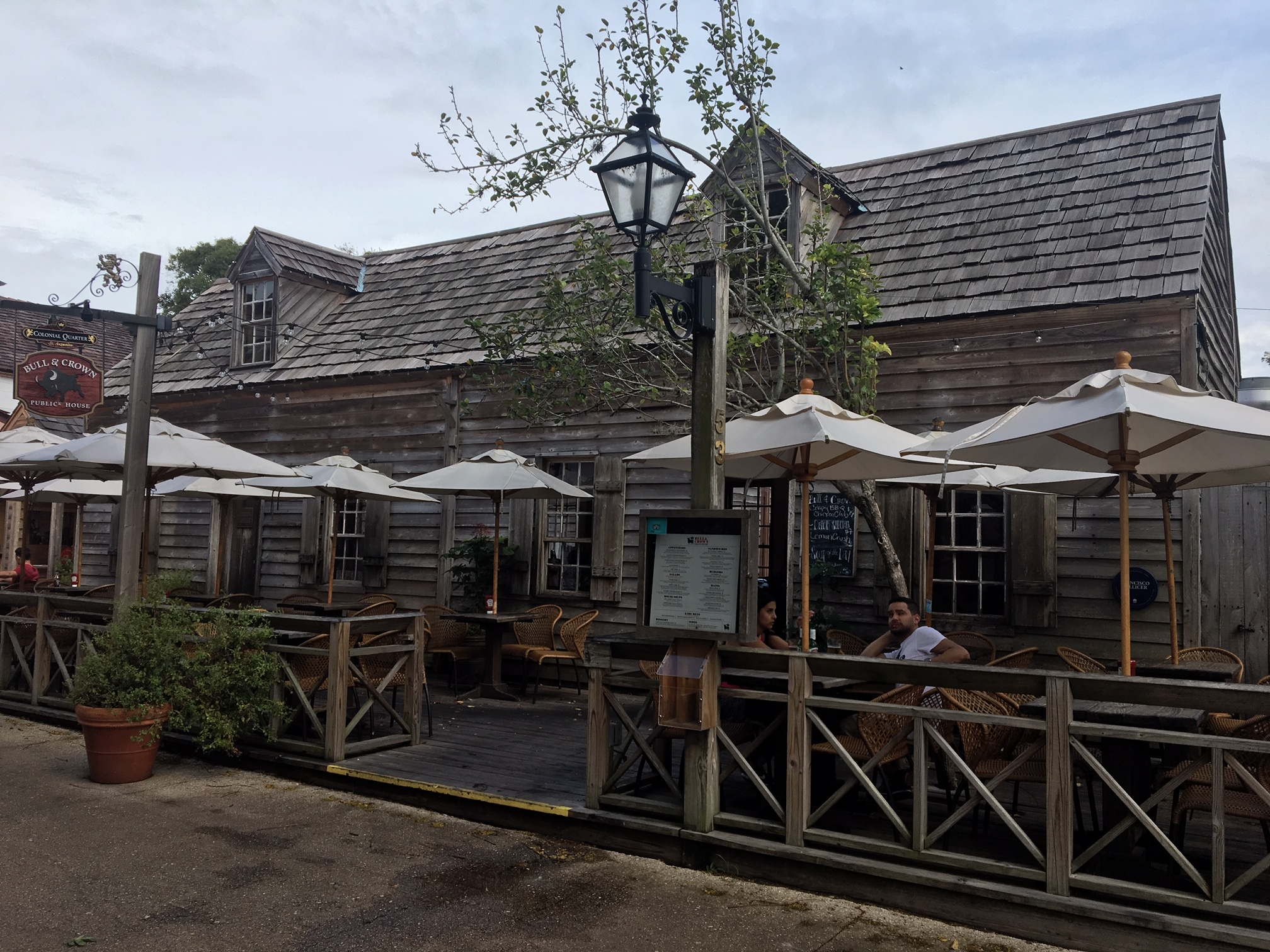
- Pellicer-De Burgo House, 2018

- Location within Florida
- Location: 31 St. George Street; St. Augustine, Florida
- Coordinates: 29°54′54″N 81°18′44″W
- Built: 1974
- Architectural style: British Colonial
- Part of: St. Augustine Town Plan Historic District (ID70000847)

The Pellicer-De Burgo House is located at 53 St. George Street in St. Augustine, Florida. It is a reconstruction of two connected houses built during the British Period (1763-1783) of East Florida.

== History ==
According to a Spanish map of 1763, there were two lots at the site of the Pellicer-De Burgo property. The north lot had belonged to Lucas Escovedo and the south lot had belonged to Prudencia Ansures but the two owners left St. Augustine as the British took over the colony after the 1763 Treaty of Paris. At the beginning of St. Augustine's British Period, agent Jesse Fish was put in charge of selling the two lots. He sold them to Francisco Pellicer and José Peso de Burgo in 1780. Pellicer's wife and two youngest children died shortly after he bought the lot.

In 2000, Francisco Pellicer was nominated to become part of the Great Floridians Program. Pellicer Creek, just south of St. Augustine, is named after Francisco Pellicer.

Minorcan Pellicer and Corsican Peso de Burgo had been members of Dr. Andrew Turnbull's New Smyrna colony that eventually ended up in St. Augustine. Pellicer was a master carpenter and had built Turnbull's plantation home. Allegedly Pellicer was one of the men who came to Governor Tonyn in 1777 charging Turnbull with mistreatment of fellow colonists. In 1784 Peso de Burgo was identified as a storekeeper and half owner of a sloop.

A 1788 map describes both houses as being wooden. Both houses were one room and shared a wall. There was also a small outbuilding on the lot. Pellicer built his own house and potentially Peso de Burgo's as well. Peso de Burgo moved out of his home before 1791 and rented it out to lodgers.

In 1787 Francisco Pellicer sold his home to Greek fisherman and sailor Demetrios Fundulakis and his wife Maria Bros. Peso de Burgo sold his house in 1791 to Juan Sánchez, the chief master caulker of the royal works, who also rented out the house for income. He sold it in 1792 to John Martin Struder, who in turn sold the house in the mid-1790s to a Minorcan farmer named Pedro Fusha.

At some point prior to 1831, when a map show the lots to be vacant, the two houses were demolished. One Peter Arnau owned both lots at that time.

== Reconstruction ==
An archaeological excavation at the lots of the Pellicer-De Burgo House was conducted in 1973 funded by the Florida Bicentennial Commission to look for the original wooden foundations of the two houses. Senator Verle Pope donated towards the cost of reconstructing the buildings.

An article from 1974 tells us that the Pellicer-De Burgo lot was locally known as the Paffe property before the reconstruction project. The project was completed in March 1977, and was one of the last houses reconstructed for San Agustín Antiguo, St. Augustine's living history museum. Ironically, though this project was called "restoration" it actually resulted in the demolition of the home and gallery of one of America's famous artists, Earl Cunningham(1893-1977)--often called "Grandpa Moses" for his similarity to the well-known Grandma Moses. The Menello Museum in Orlando has the best-known collection of Cunningham's work.

The Historic St. Augustine Preservation Board reserved the structures to house an exhibit on the Minorcans that moved from New Smyrna to St. Augustine. On August 5, 1996, the Board had a grand opening of "The Minorcans of St. Augustine" where they served Minorcan dishes to guests. The project was financed in part with the Historical Museum Grants-in-Aid Program out of the Museum of Florida History, Bureau of Historical Museums, Florida Department of State. The exhibit, part of the what was then known as the Spanish Quarter, and is now the Colonial Quarter in downtown St. Augustine, was advertised in local newspapers. It displayed panels on the Minorcans that travelled to New Smyrna, their social conditions, and their later influence on St. Augustine trade, customs, language, and food.

== Present Day ==
Today 53 St. George Street is the Bull and Crown Publick House restaurant in downtown St. Augustine. It is one of the eateries within the Colonial Quarter. The house is owned by the State of Florida and managed on its behalf by University of Florida Historic St. Augustine, Inc.
