= Ribera House =

- U.S. Historic district – Contributing property
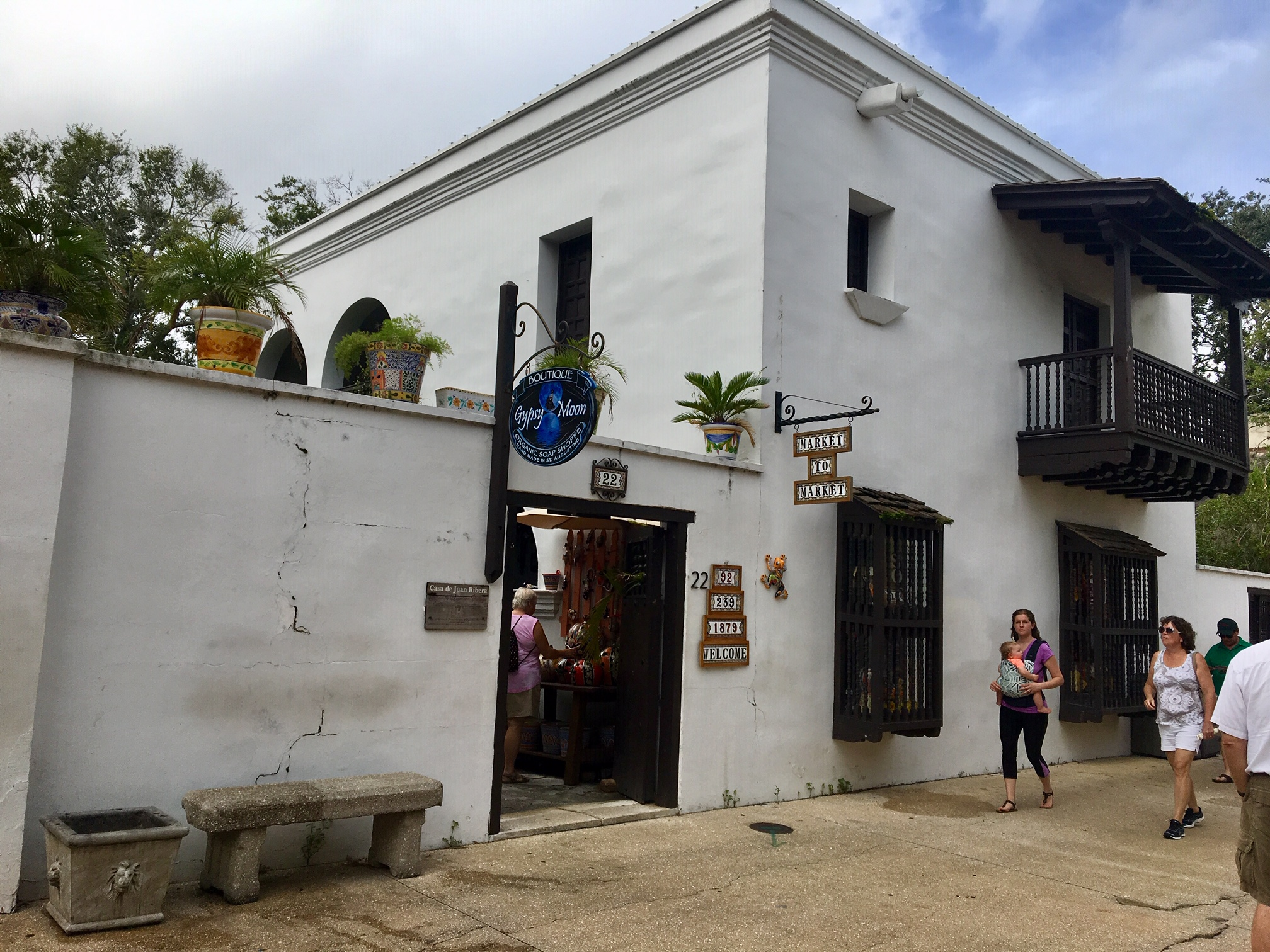
- Ribera House, 2018

- Location within Florida
- Location: 22 St. George St; St. Augustine, Florida
- Coordinates: 29°54′54″N 81°18′44″W
- Built: 1965
- Architectural style: Spanish Colonial
- Part of: St. Augustine Town Plan Historic District (ID70000847)

The Ribera House is located at 22 St. George Street in St. Augustine, Florida. It is a reconstruction of the home that originally stood on this site during the First Spanish Period (1565-1764) of St. Augustine.

== History ==
It is unknown when the Ribera House was first built. Juan de Rivera was listed as the owner of the property in a 1764 Spanish map. He was a native Tolomato Indian and an artilleryman at the Castillo de San Marcos. He died in Cuba in 1772, and the original structure was torn down circa 1777.

== Historic St. Augustine Preservation Board ==
The Historic St. Augustine Preservation Board purchased the Parks Hotel in 1963 and demolished it in 1964 to reconstruct the Ribera House, which was completed in 1965. An old coquina wall had been found under a sidewalk in front of the Parks Hotel. The wall was twenty-three inches thick, thicker than walls of average coquina structures built during the First Spanish Period. Archaeological work was completed at the site by eight students from Florida State University under the direction of Dr. Hale Smith, director of anthropology at FSU, and Robert Steinbach, the archaeologist for the Preservation Commission. The combination of Spanish records and the archaeological records in the 1960s allowed the Preservation Commission to reconstruct the Ribera House with 90% accuracy, said Early Newton, executive director of the Commission.

Funds for the project came from the Commission's private foundation, St. Augustine Restoration Foundation, Inc, as well as from donations by Winn-Dixie, Florida Power & Light, and Lawrence Lewis, one of the founders of Flagler College. The house was reconstructed on the original foundations discovered during archaeological digs. It is built of coquina, a type of limestone formed by compacted seashells. It operated as the orientation center of San Agustín Antiguo, the Preservation Board’s 18th century museum village. The house was interpreted as a representation of a wealthy St. Augustine family.

The Ribera House Garden became the first formal garden in the restored downtown area. There was a dedication ceremony to open the garden in early May 1968. The president of the Florida Federation of Garden Clubs, Inc., Carroll O. Griffin, presided over the ceremony. A committee appointed by the past president of the Federation of Garden Clubs, a Mrs. Blanchard, planned the garden itself. The garden held plants of the variety that were known to have existed in colonial St. Augustine.

== Present Day ==
Today the Ribera House is a retail store managed on behalf of the state of Florida by the University of Florida Historic St. Augustine. The adjacent garden is currently being restored with new landscaping and historical interpretation of the site; it will be opened to the public in 2019.
