= Gonzáles and De Hita Houses =

- Gonzales and De Hita Houses
- U.S. Historic district – Contributing property
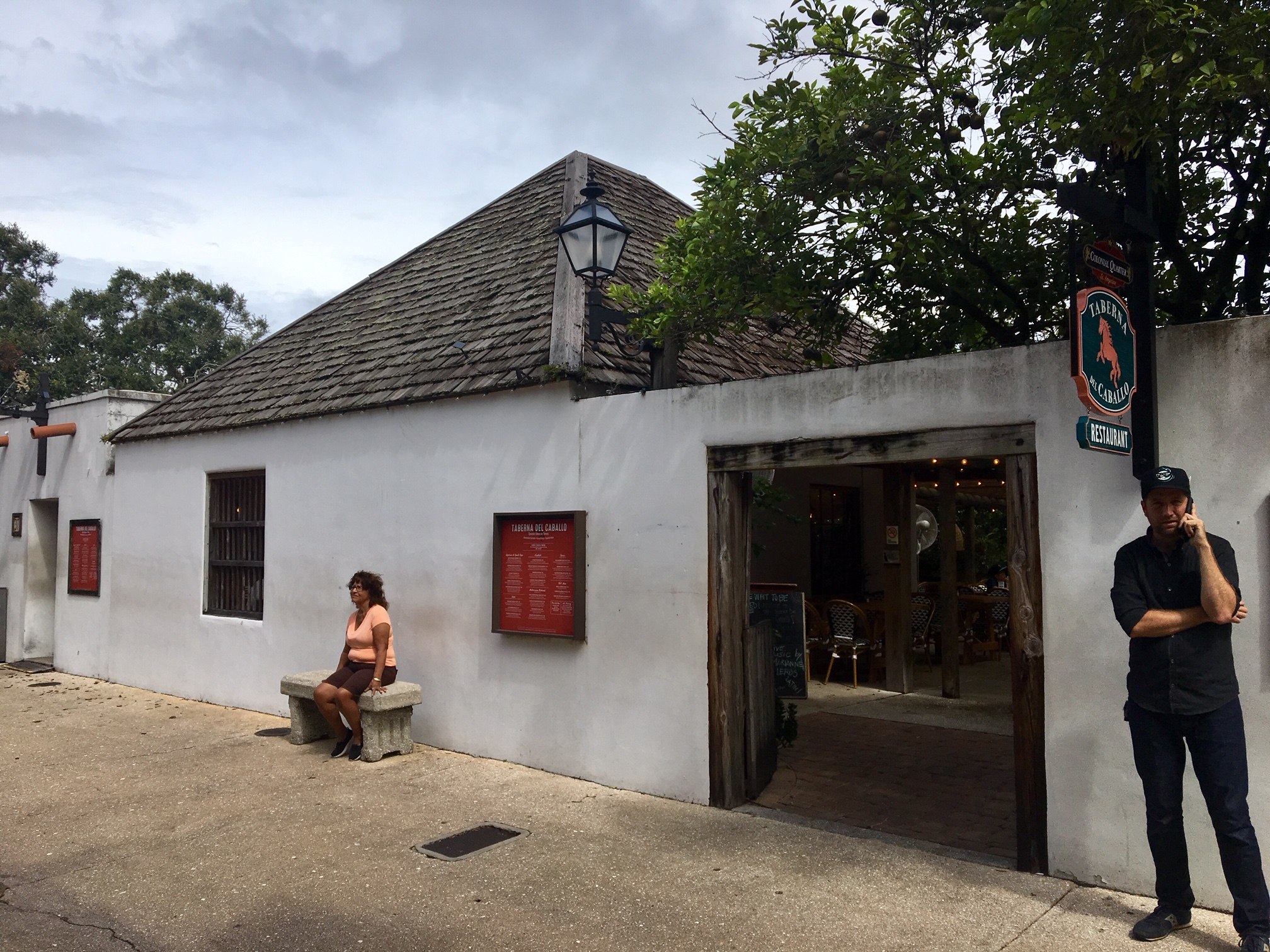
- Taberna de Caballo, 2018

- Location within Florida
- Location: 35 St. George St; St. Augustine, Florida
- Coordinates: 29°54′54″N 81°18′44″W
- Built: 1979
- Architectural style: Spanish Colonial
- Part of: St. Augustine Town Plan Historic District (ID70000847)

The Gonzáles House and the De Hita Houses are located at 33 and 35 St. George Street, St. Augustine, Florida. Both houses are reconstructions of First Spanish Period (1565-1763) homes built on their original foundations.

== History ==
A 1763 Spanish map shows that at the same lot stood a coquina house belonging to Bernardo Gonzáles and a tabby house belonging to Gerónimo de Hita. Both of these men served in the mounted dragoons and lived near the Castillo de San Marcos. When the two left Florida at the start of the Florida’s British Period (1763-1783), the properties went to Jesse Fish, who in turn sold them to Captain Andrew Rainsford. The lot was vacant for much of the 19th century.

== Historic St. Augustine Preservation Board ==
The Historic St. Augustine Preservation Board purchased the land where the De Hita House once stood with funds donated by Elizabeth Towers, a member of the board. The Board (at that time called the St. Augustine Historical Restoration and Preservation Commission) won a condemnation suit to acquire the Smith boardinghouse (Gonzáles House) at 33 St. George Street for $17,500. Within thirty days, the Smith property was to be demolished and restorative work continued at both sites. The city of St. Augustine had granted the Commission condemnation powers in 1959 at its inception. After two years of failing to negotiate a selling price for the Smith boardinghouse, the Commission decided to go to court, as a last resort.

Archaeological digs led by Dr. Kathleen Deagan of Florida State University revealed the original foundations. The reconstruction of the two homes was completed in 1979 with funding from the Florida Bicentennial Commission.

== Present day ==
Today the Gonzáles and De Hita Houses operate as the Taberna del Caballo, a Spanish themed restaurant that is part of St. Augustine’s Colonial Quarter Museum. It is managed on behalf of the state by University of Florida Historic St. Augustine, Inc.
