= Rodríguez House (St. Augustine) =

- Antonio Jose Rodriguez House
- U.S. Historic district – Contributing property
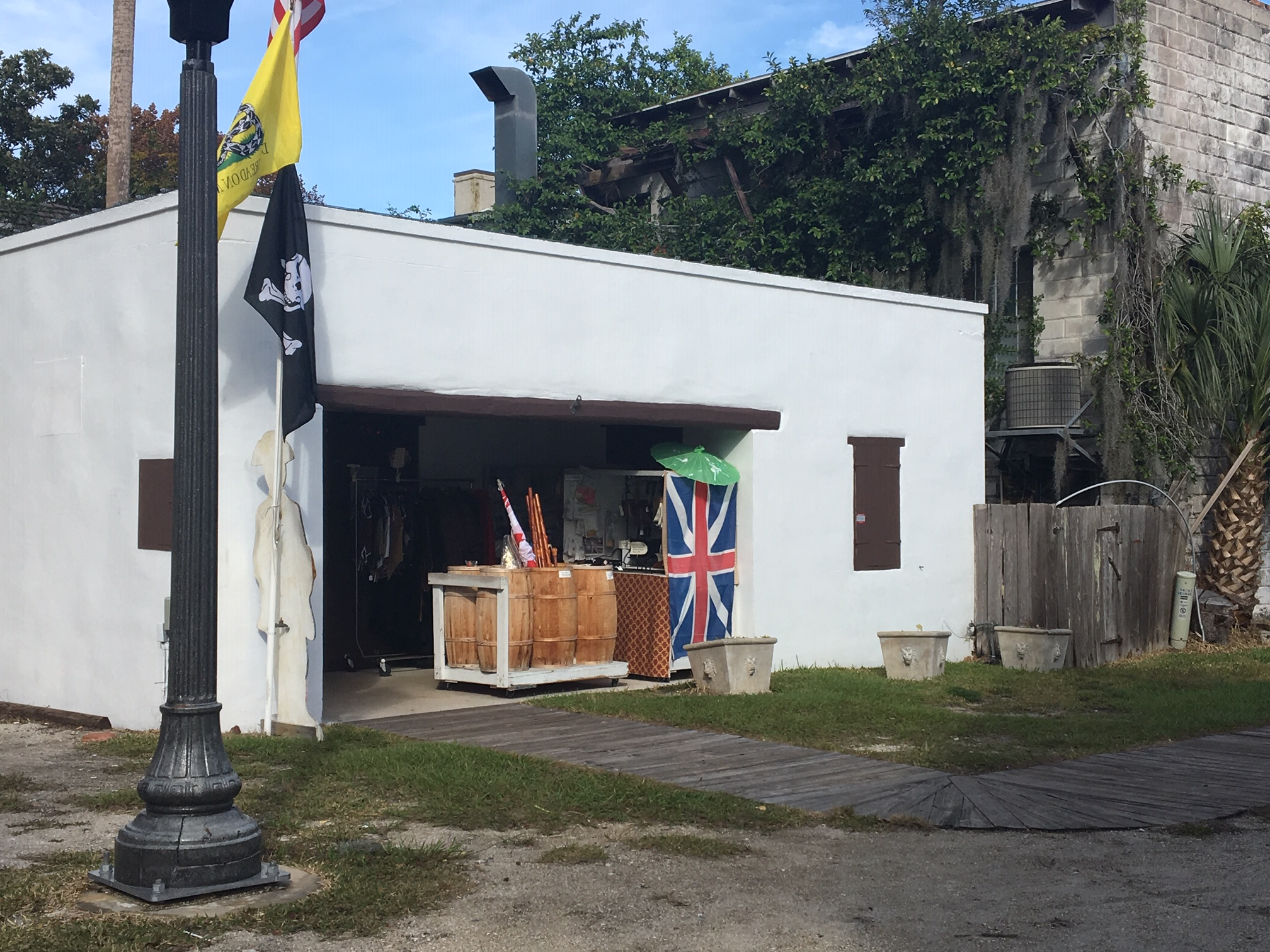
- Rodriguez House, 2018

- Location within Florida
- Location: 58 St. George Street; St. Augustine, Florida
- Coordinates: 29°53′45.4″N 81°18′48.4″W
- Built: 1969
- Architectural style: Spanish Colonial
- Part of: St. Augustine Town Plan Historic District (ID70000847)

The Rodríguez House is located at 58 St. George Street in St. Augustine, Florida. It is a reconstructed structure where there was once a tabby house during Florida's First Spanish Period (1565-1763). It is part of the St. Augustine Town Plan Historic District.

== History ==
A Spanish map dating to 1764 indicates that this small two-room house belonged to Antonio Jose Rodríguez, son of Jose Antonio Rodriguez of Seville and Gertrude Morales. The house was most likely demolished during the British Period when British soldiers pulled down tabby houses to reuse the building materials. Early homes such as the Rodríguez House had flat wooden roofs and no fireplaces. The rooms were heated with braziers.

== Reconstruction ==
The St. Augustine Restoration Inc. decided to take on reconstructing the Rodríguez House in the late 1960s using funds donated by Edward Ball of Jacksonville, Florida. During the time of St. Augustine's downtown living history museum, San Agustín Antiguo, this structure was used to house craft demonstrations such as pottery making. Evalina Manucy, of Florida State University, demonstrated pottery in the Rodríguez House in 1968, having already worked for the Board as a weaver, baker, and candlemaker. The Historic St. Augustine Preservation Board acquired the house in 1983.

== Present day ==
Today the Rodríguez House is a retail store, St. Augustine Textiles, started by Jon Williams, re-enactor. St. Augustine Textiles provides historical costumes, uniforms, and accessories to a wide audience. The house is owned by the State of Florida and managed on its behalf by University of Florida Historic St. Augustine Inc.
