= Sánchez de Ortigosa House =

Coordinates: 29°53′45.1″N 81°18′47.5″W

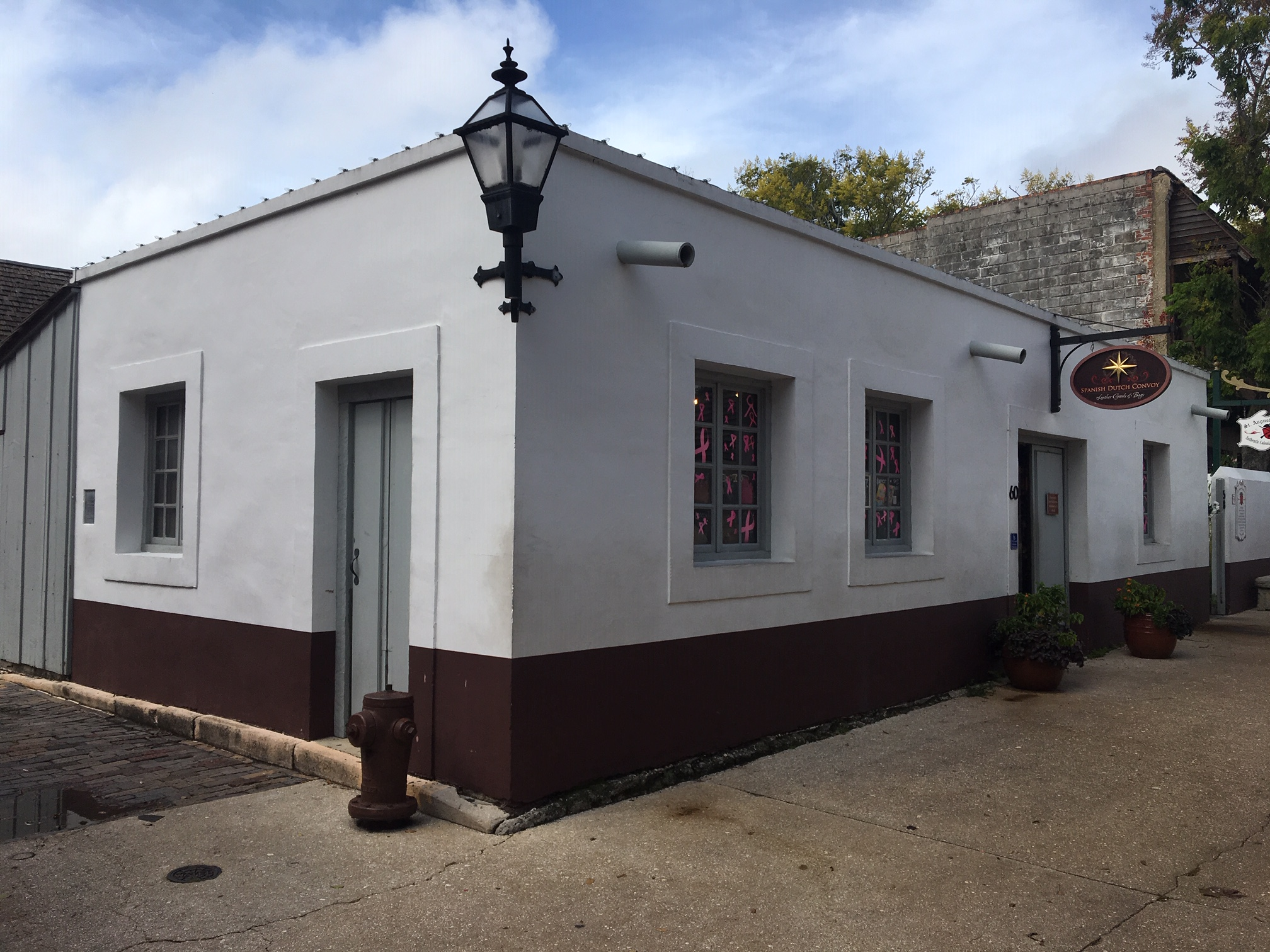
Sanchez de Ortigosa, 2018

The Sánchez de Ortigosa House is located at 60 St. George Street, St. Augustine, Florida, United States. It is a reconstruction of a home dating from the First Spanish Period (1565-1763) that stood on this site.

== History ==
The Sánchez de Ortigosa House shows up on city maps in 1763 and 1765 as being a stone building belonging to José Sánchez de Ortigosa. Sánchez de Ortigosa was from Ronda, Spain. He married a local woman, Juana Theodora Pérez, with whom he had nine children. He was a privateer.

By 1788, during Florida's British Period (1763-1783), the stone house had been razed and a wooden house stood in its place. Restoration Commission Director Earle Newton stated that First Spanish Period homes did not last because the English tended to tear them down for use of the building materials and replace them with wooden structures.

== Restoration ==
The St. Augustine Historic Restoration and Preservation Commission (later the Historic St. Augustine Preservation Board) completed a reconstruction of the Sánchez de Ortigosa house in 1966. It was built as a one-story pink house on the corners of St. George Street and Cuna Street. The roof was built of tile and cement.

Additional funding for this reconstruction was donated by Edward Ball of Jacksonville.

== San Agustín Antiguo ==
During the time of the living history museum San Agustín Antiguo in St. Augustine, the Sánchez de Ortigosa house served as a First Spanish Period carpenter's shop. Antiques were repaired there and custom pieces were made for exhibition houses and for public sale. Earl Shugart made woodwork and furnishings there for the restoration area. The Preservation Board also had a contract to construct furniture for the Southern Bell Telephone Company building to go up on Charlotte Street. Kjell Lunestad was a Norwegian wood carver and cabinet maker who was hired in 1968 who also worked at the Sánchez de Ortigosa shop. He made items such as monk's benches and hope chests. He used no nails, but rather fitted white pine and fir together without them.

== Present day ==
Today this site is retail space, operated by the Spanish Dutch Convoy. It is managed on behalf of the state by University of Florida Historic St. Augustine, Inc.
