= Luciano de Herrera House =

- U.S. Historic district – Contributing property
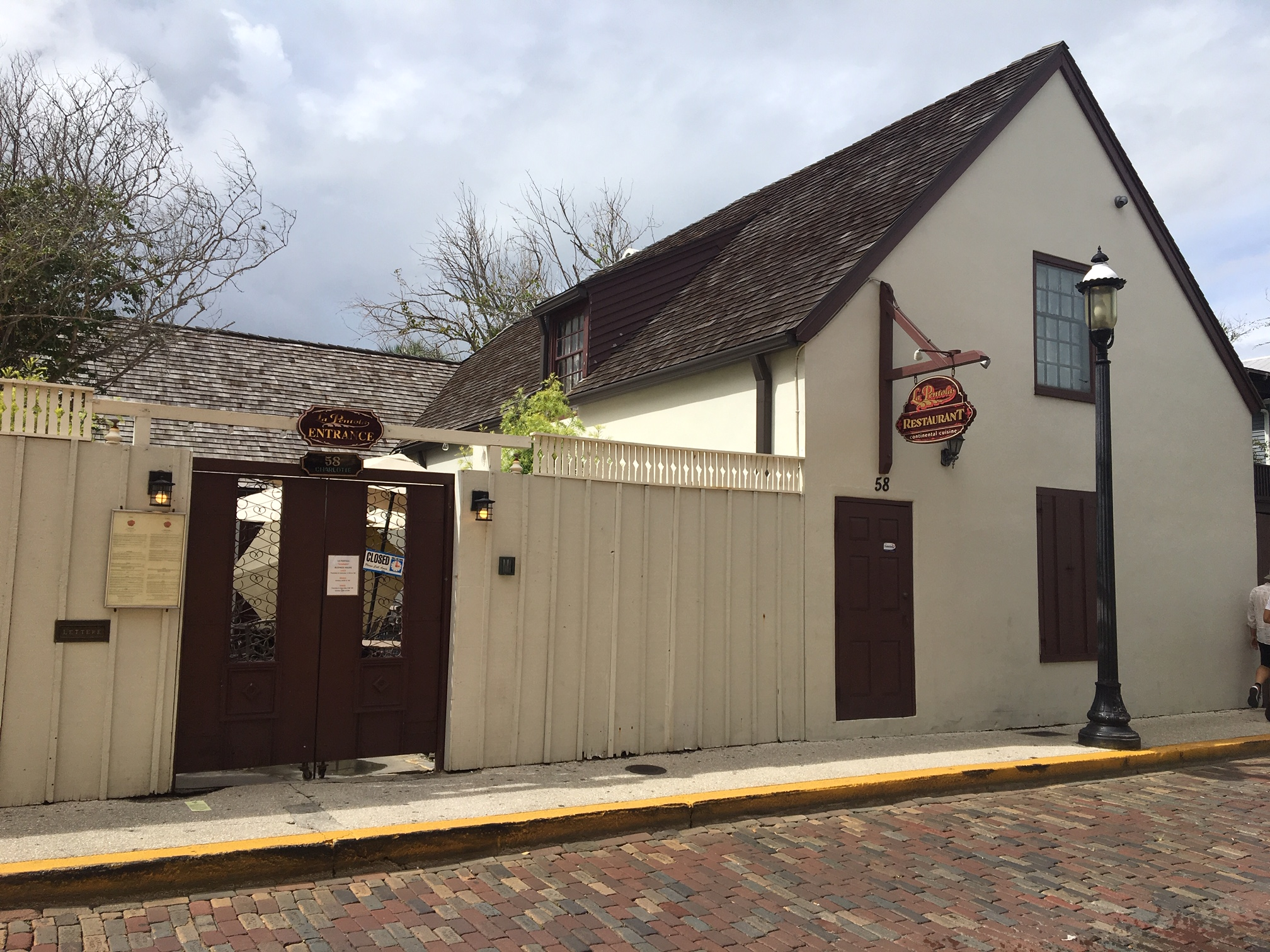
- Herrera House, 2018

- Location within Florida
- Location: 58 Charlotte St; St. Augustine, Florida
- Coordinates: 29°54′54″N 81°18′44″W
- Built: 1967
- Architectural style: Spanish Colonial
- Website: La Pentola Restaurant
- Part of: St. Augustine Town Plan Historic District (ID70000847)

The Luciano de Herrera House is located at 58 Charlotte Street in St. Augustine, Florida. It is a reconstruction, depicting a house from St. Augustine's Second Spanish Period (1784–1821).

== History ==
On a Spanish map dated 1764 this house is recorded as a “ripio” (rubblework) dwelling belonging to a Juan de Muros, most likely a military man. Juan de Muros was not a native of St. Augustine and his place of birth is illegible in records.

The 1763 Treaty of Paris ceded Florida to Great Britain. A British map dated 1765 shows that William Wilson owned the house at this site and that he had built an additional outbuilding there. Wilson made a living by purchasing and selling land.

Luciano de Herrera bought the house in 1785. De Herrera was an infamous man. He was born in St. Augustine during the First Spanish Period and stayed during the British Period, acting as a military correspondent and writing letters to Cuba, informing the Spanish there of British actions. In 1781, British Governor Patrick Tonyn found him out, and he fled to Havana to escape punishment. When he returned to St. Augustine in 1784, it was as chief overseer of works in East Florida, a reward bestowed upon him by Spanish Governor Vizente Manuel de Zéspedes.

De Herrera's descendants sold the house in 1789 to Miguel Isnardy, the sea captain and contractor for the St. Augustine Cathedral. Next in 1792, Pedro de Cala, a free black man, bought the home, which was described as being “of stone, wood and shell, on St. Charles Street.” De Cala then sold to Jose Lorente in 1797, who in turn sold to Don Gabriel Guillermo Perpall in 1803.

In the early 20th century, this site was the office for the Southern Bell Telephone and Telegraph Company.

== Restoration ==
The structure at 58 Charlotte Street today was built to portray the house as it looked during Luciano de Herrera's time. The Historic St. Augustine Preservation Board bought the property in 1966 and reconstructed it in 1967, using masonry and board and batten techniques. At the time of purchase in 1966, the site was operated by Neil Pope's Garage.
