= Triay House =

- Marie Triay House
- U.S. Historic district – Contributing property
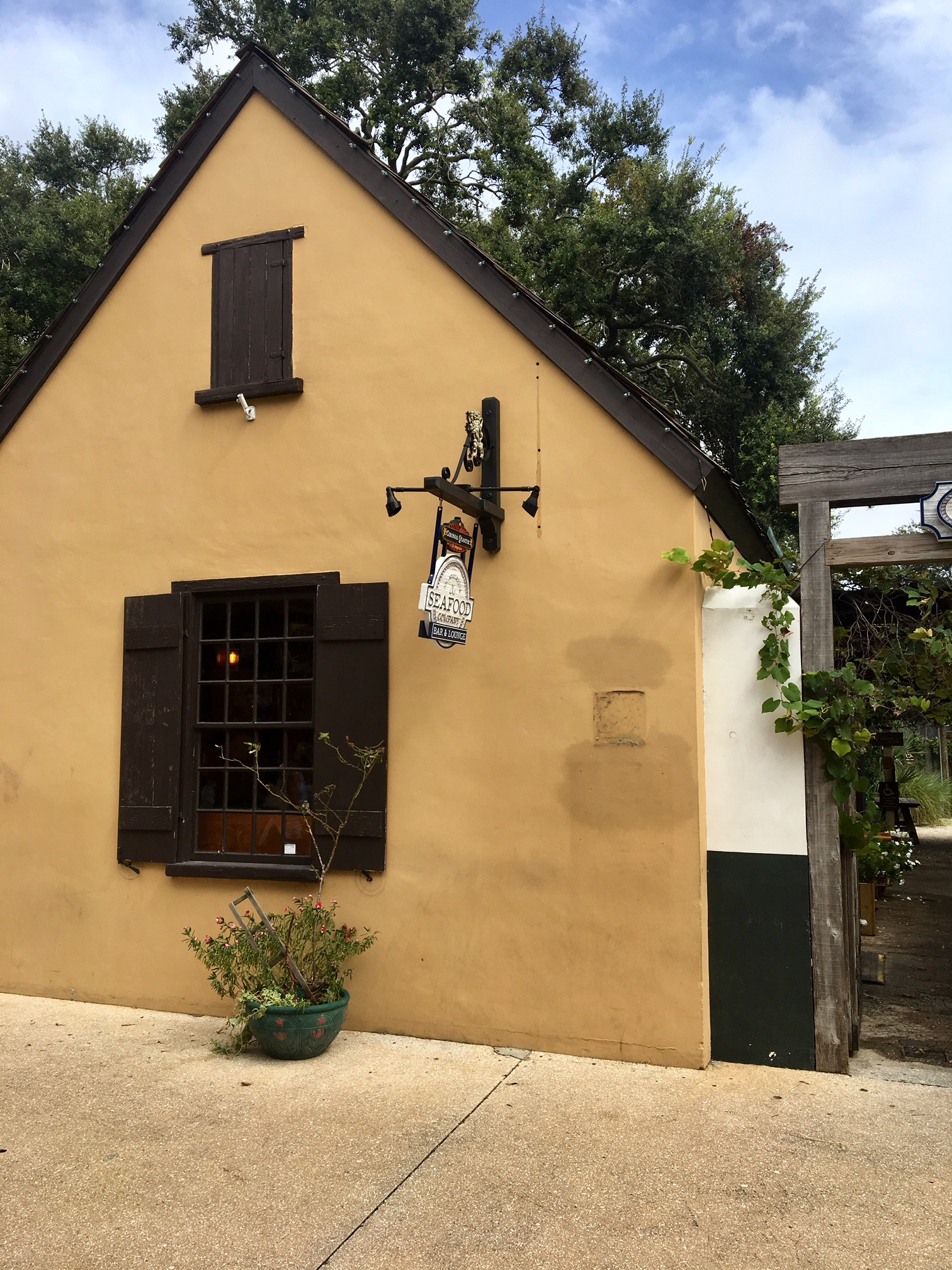
- Marie Triay House, 2018

- Location within Florida
- Location: 31 St. George St; St. Augustine, Florida
- Coordinates: 29°54′54″N 81°18′44″W
- Built: 1964
- Architectural style: Spanish Colonial
- Part of: St. Augustine Town Plan Historic District (ID70000847)

The Triay House is a historic property located at 31 St. George Street in St. Augustine, Florida. It is a reconstruction of the First Spanish Period structure that stood on the site.

== History ==
Early Spanish records of St. Augustine show that Pedro de Florencia owned a house made of stone that stood on this property during the First Spanish Period. While the British were in possession of Florida, merchant Jesse Fish held the property. Juan San Salvador bought the property when Florida was returned to Spain in 1783, but soon after sold it to Francisco Triay. Triay was a Minorcan settler who came to St. Augustine from Andrew Turnbull's New Smyrna colony. The Triay family owned the home through 1834, and the original house stood on the site as a residence and served in various commercial capacities until 1904 when a two-story house was built.

== Restoration ==
The St. Augustine Historical Restoration and Preservation Commission (later the Historic St. Augustine Preservation Board) purchased the property where the Triay House once stood in 1964 from Charles Bennett and Buel Baker. Archaeological digs at the site revealed the original foundations, on which the house was reconstructed. The home was a small two room structure made of coquina.

== Modern ==
Today the Triay House operates as the St. Augustine Seafood Company, and the building is managed on behalf of the state by University of Florida Historic St. Augustine, Inc.
