= Blacksmith Shop (St. Augustine, Florida) =

- U.S. Historic district – Contributing property
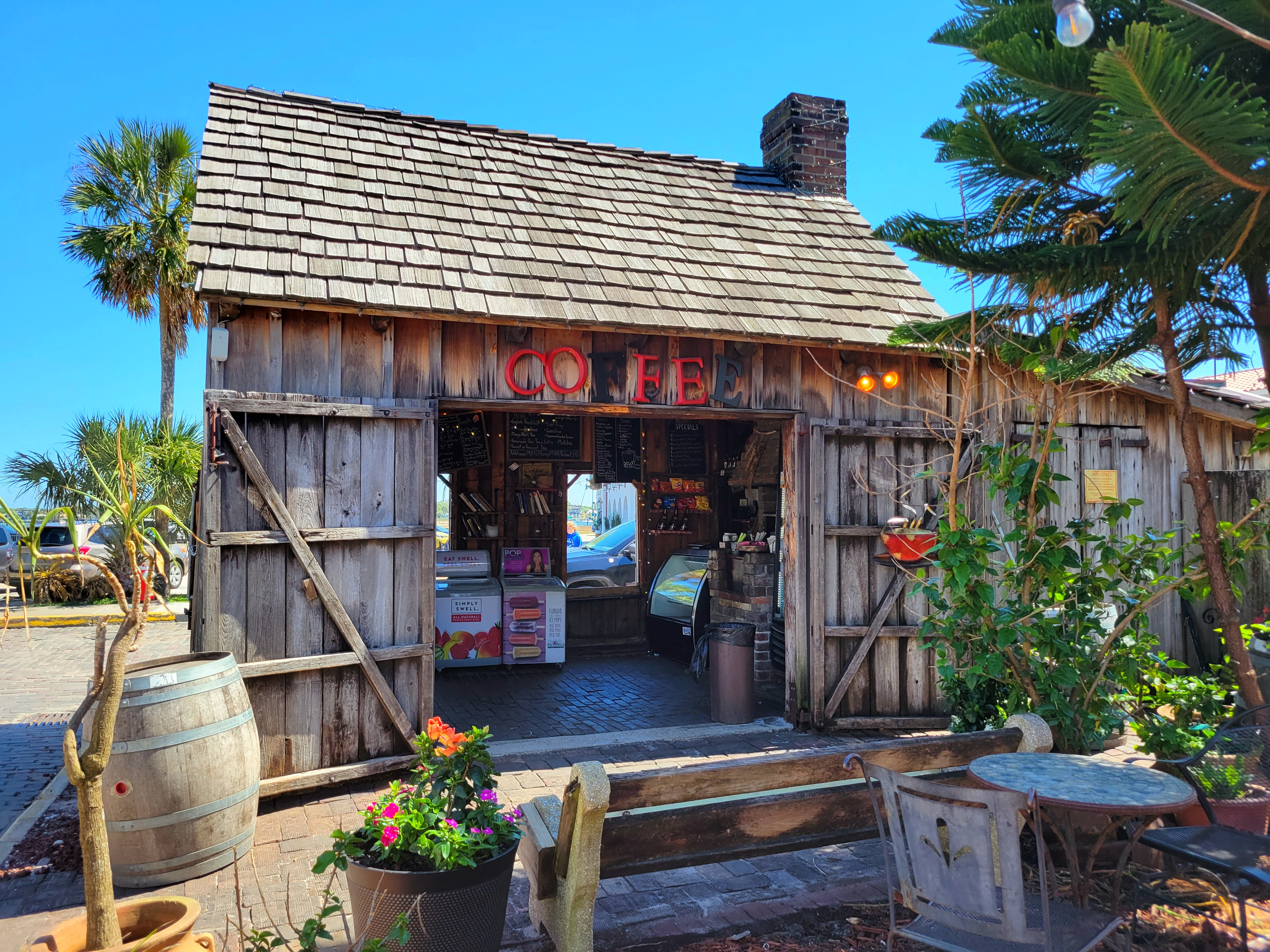
- Old Blacksmith Shop

- Location within Florida
- Location: 16 Charlotte St; St. Augustine, Florida
- Coordinates: 29°54′54″N 81°18′44″W
- Built: 1967
- Architectural style: British Colonial
- Part of: St. Augustine Town Plan Historic District (ID70000847)

The Old Blacksmith Shop is located at 26 Charlotte Street in St. Augustine, Florida. It is a reconstruction of an outbuilding located on the site during the British possession of Florida.

== History ==
Not much is known about the history of the original blacksmith shop. The oldest known record of the structure is from 1771, during the British Period in St. Augustine. At that time, there were several similarly constructed outbuildings. In 1782 the property was sold to David Morran, who rented one of the buildings to a blacksmith. When the 1783 Treaty of Paris gave Florida back to Spain, David Morran returned to England but left his wife in St. Augustine to manage the sale of his properties. She was unsuccessful, and Jesse Fish and James Henderson managed the sale to the Spaniards.

== Historic St. Augustine Preservation Board ==
The Historic St. Augustine Preservation Board began the reconstruction of the Blacksmith Shop in late 1967 and completed it in 1968. The home that stood on the site at the time, known as the Judson Property, was demolished in 1967. The Preservation Board's in-house construction crew built the 12 x 16 foot wooden outbuilding from pine logs that were cut with a broad axe and adze, in accordance with the historic construction methods that would have been used at the time. The shop had a dirt floor with no windows and no insulation. During the 1970s, it served as a working blacksmith shop for San Agustín Antiguo. The board wanted to closely replicate the experience of an 18th-century shop and installed a double forge. Visitors could watch the blacksmith, who was a descendant of early Minorcan settlers, making horseshoes and doing more intricate ironwork for other Preservation Board properties.

== Present Day ==
Today the Blacksmith Shop operates as a coffee shop, Crucial Coffee Café. It is managed on behalf of the state by University of Florida Historic St. Augustine, Inc.
