= Gallegos House =

U.S. Historic district contributing property

- U.S. Historic district – Contributing property
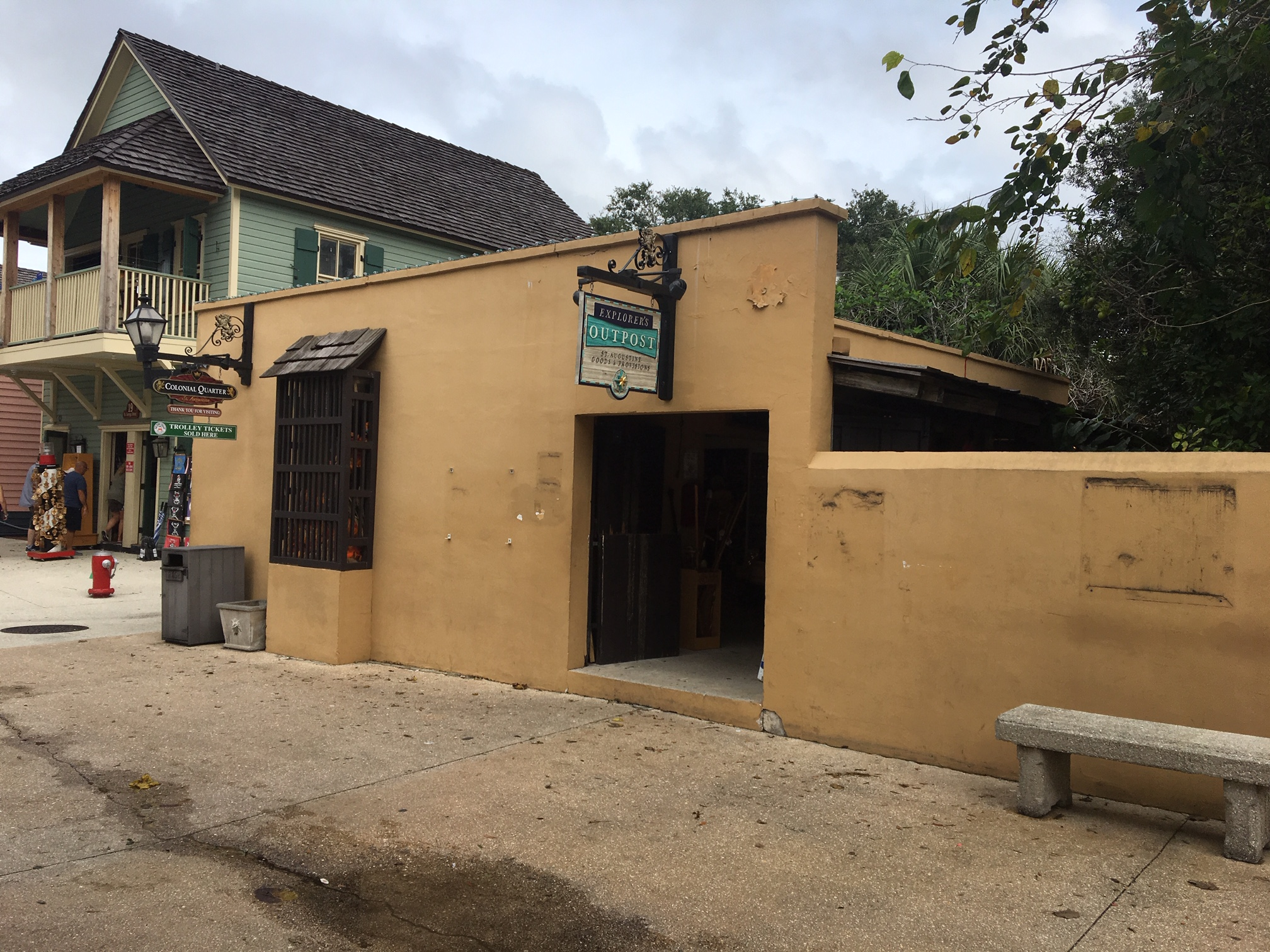
- Gallegos House, 2018

- Location within Florida
- Location: 21 St. George St; St. Augustine, Florida
- Coordinates: 29°54′54″N 81°18′44″W
- Built: 1962
- Architectural style: Spanish Colonial
- Part of: St. Augustine Town Plan Historic District (ID70000847)

The Gallegos House is located at 21 St. George Street in St. Augustine, Florida. It is a reconstructed property demonstrating a typical home of Florida's First Spanish Period (1565-1764).

== History ==
The original home was built in 1720 and was listed as the property of Juan Garcia Martinez Gallegos on a 1764 map of St. Augustine. By 1788, another map shows that original structure had been replaced by a timber-frame house built by Lucia Escalona.

The Historic St. Augustine Preservation Board reconstructed the Gallegos home in 1962 on its original site. It was their third completed project. They used authentic historical methods of construction, building the structure of an oyster-shell concrete mix known as tabby. The home only has two rooms and a flat roof. It demonstrates typical architecture of the First Spanish Period in that it has no entry from the street but rather through a courtyard on the side for security and privacy. There are no openings on the north wall, which during colonial times would have helped to keep out winds. The Gallegos House served as the Information Center for the Preservation Board's museum village, San Agustin Antiguo.

== Present Day ==
Today the Gallegos House stands on the corner of St. George Street and Fort Alley. is a gift shop for the Colonial Quarter and is adjacent to the Colonial Oak Music Park complex in downtown St. Augustine.
