= Sims Silversmith Shop =

- U.S. Historic district – Contributing property
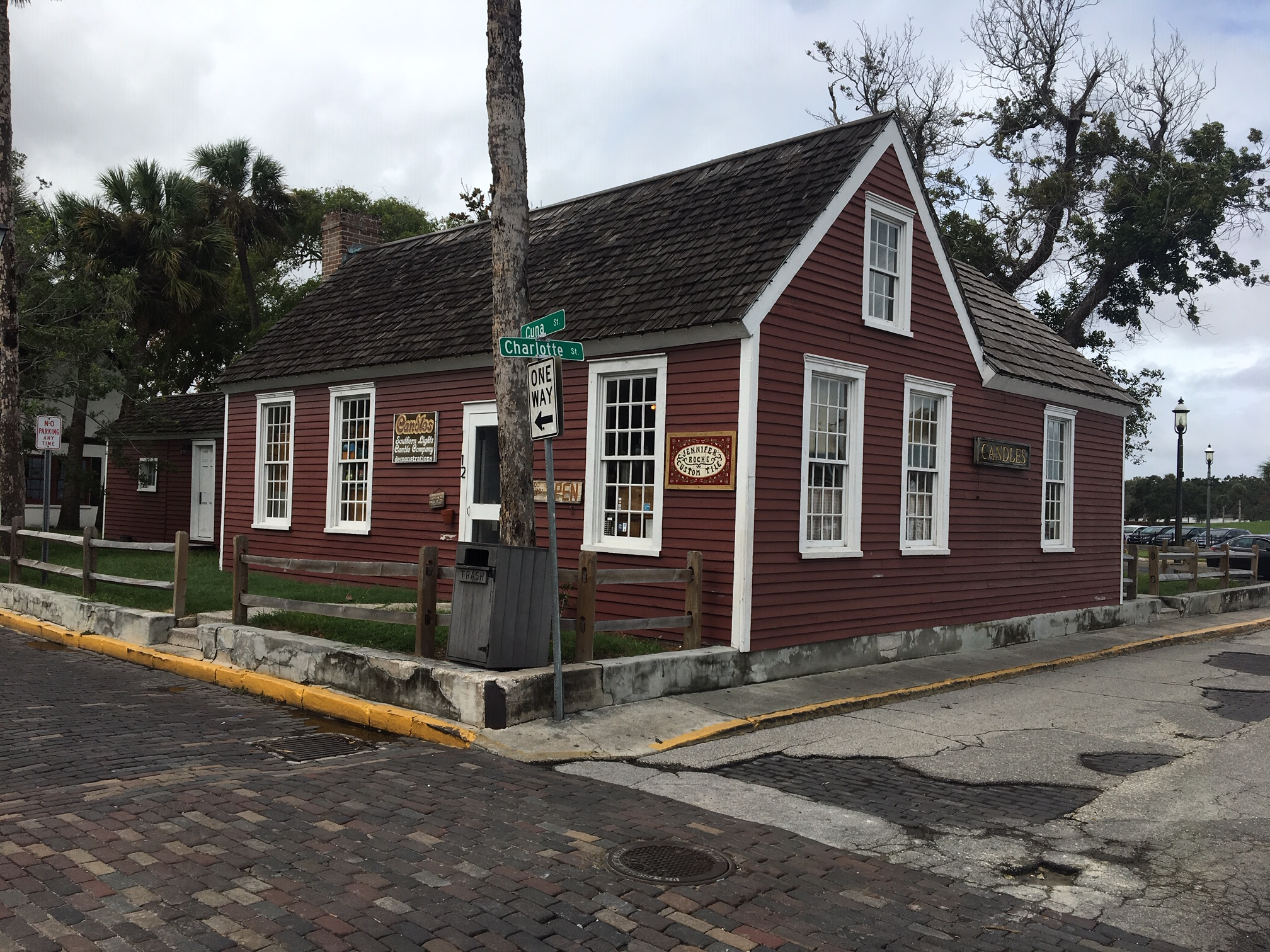
- Sims Silversmith Shop, 2018

- Location within Florida
- Location: 12 Cuna St; St. Augustine, Florida
- Coordinates: 29°54′54″N 81°18′44″W
- Built: 1964
- Architectural style: British Colonial
- Part of: St. Augustine Town Plan Historic District (ID70000847)

A reproduction of Sims Silversmith Shop, operated by the Historic St. Augustine Preservation Board, is located on the site that is now 12 Cuna Street in St. Augustine, Florida. The precise location of William Sims's 18th century original shop is unknown.

== William Sims ==
William Sims was a silversmith from Scotland who operated a shop in the town of St. Augustine during the town's British Period (1763-1784). When he moved to St. Augustine he came with a wife, a son, and four enslaved people. It is possible that in Savannah, being a loyalist, he was convicted of treason and left the colony of Georgia approximately in 1774.

== History ==
The Historic St. Augustine Preservation Board constructed the building in 1964 to be a typical shop built by Anglo-American refugees from the American Revolution in the 1780s. It is a wooden framed building consisting of a gable roof, wood floors, wood shingles, and a brick foundation.

One half of the reconstructed building was put on display as a silversmith's shop. During the era of the living history museum San Augustín Antiguo in the 1960s and the 1970s, the room was full of iron tools such as anvils and hammers. The Historic St. Augustine Preservation Board furnished the museum space with modern reproductions as well, such as a set of dies for shaping silver wire, a work bench, and a bellows beside the fireplace where casting was done.

== Present day ==
Today the site of Historic St. Augustine Preservation Board's reproduced silversmith shop is a retail space occupied by Southern Lights Candle Company.
