= Verle Pope =

American politician

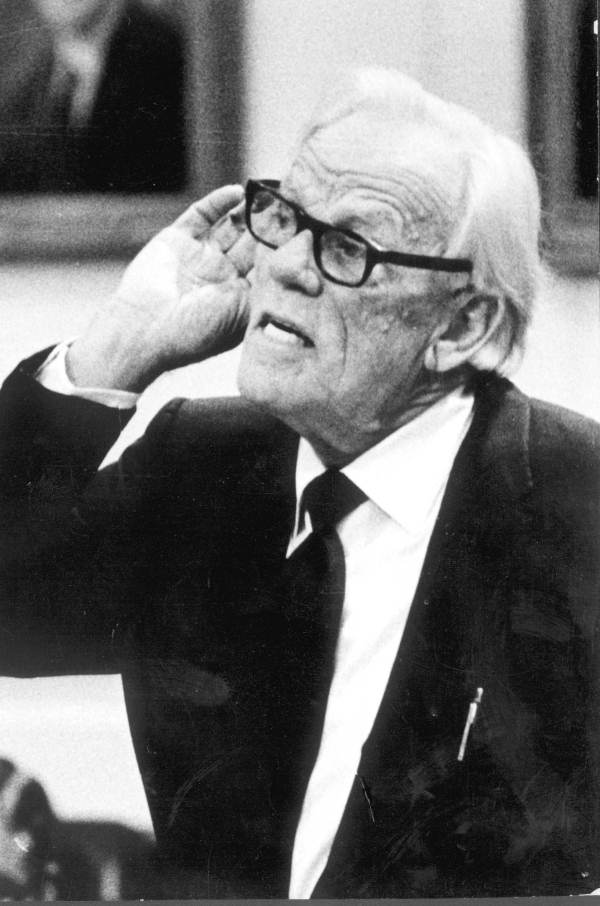
- Senator Pope on the floor, 1971

President of the Florida Senate
- In office April 4, 1967 – November 12, 1968
- Preceded by: James E. Connor
- Succeeded by: John Mathews Jr.

President Pro Tempore of the Florida Senate
- In office April 6, 1965 – April 4, 1967
- Preceded by: Harry Stratton
- Succeeded by: Dempsey Barron

Member of the Florida Senate
- In office April 5, 1949 – November 21, 1972
- Preceded by: Walter B. Fraser
- Succeeded by: Curtis Peterson
- Constituency: 31st (1948–1967); 12th (1967–1972)

Member of the Florida House of Representatives from the St. Johns County district
- In office 1943

Personal details
- Born: December 12, 1903 Jacksonville, Florida
- Died: July 18, 1973 (aged 69) St. Augustine, Florida
- Party: Democratic
- Spouse: Edith Taylor (m. 1933; died 1961)
- Education: University of Florida

Verle Allyn Pope (December 12, 1903 – July 18, 1973), nicknamed The Lion of St. Johns, was a prominent Florida legislator, serving for 24 years in the Florida House of Representatives and the Florida Senate.

Born in Jacksonville to deaf parents, he attended high school, and was prominent in athletics and speech. He enlisted in the Air Corps in 1928 but was forced out of service due to a previously sustained knee injury. Seeking political office in 1934, he became county commissioner of St. Johns County. Eight years later, he successfully ran for a seat in the Florida House of Representatives, but later resigned due to acceptance into the U.S. Army. Shortly upon his return from oversees that saw him win awards for his service, in 1948, he ran, again successfully, as a senator for St. Augustine in the Florida Senate. Among the 24 years he served, he was involved in many important issues and held positions like President pro tempore and President of the Senate. He was forced into retirement in 1972 by bone cancer and died of it the year after.

== Early life ==
Pope was born at Jacksonville in 1903 to two deaf parents, Artemus and Cora Carlton Pope, who were in the first graduating class of the Florida School for the Deaf and Blind in St. Augustine. As a child, Pope and his family moved multiple times around the state of Florida before settling in St. Augustine. He learned sign language to communicate with his parents and did not start speaking until he was seven years of age. He dropped out of school at the age of 14 and fabricated his age to join the United States Army, but this was soon discovered and he was forced back home to finish high school, when he honed oratory and athletic skills. Upon finishing high school, he enrolled in the University of Florida where he hoped to have a prosperous football career. However, he suffered a torn cartilage in his knee shortly thereafter from football that forced him out of the university altogether and back home. He then joined the United States Air Corps in 1928, but the knee injury he had previously sustained forced him out of that, as well.

== Political career ==
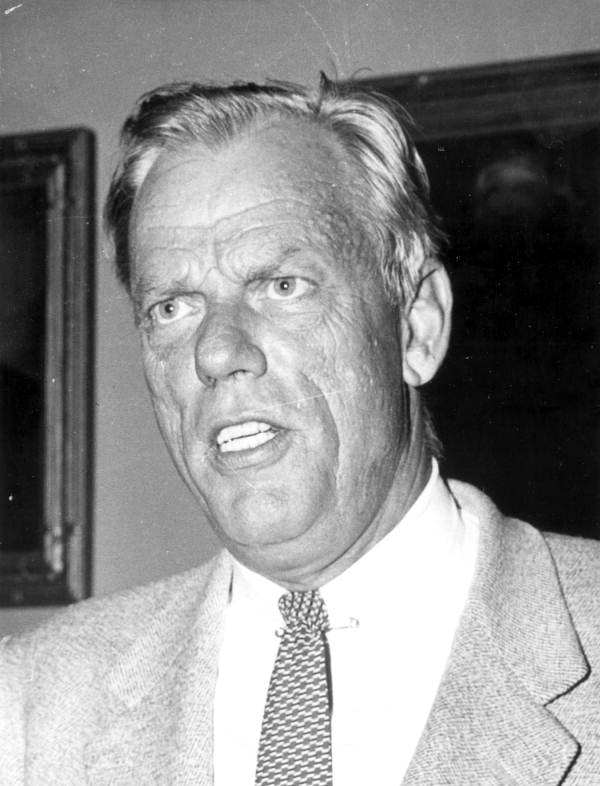
Pope in 1961

In 1934, he first sought public office as St. Johns County Commissioner, winning and defeating the incumbent by 26 votes. He was elected to the Florida House of Representatives for St. Johns County to serve in the 1943 session, but soon thereafter resigned to join the U.S. Army to fight in World War II. During his years of service, which ended in December 1945, he won an Air Medal and Croix de Guerre while serving in Europe.

Almost immediately upon his return to Florida, Pope got back into politics, running for and winning a seat in the Florida State Senate in 1948. Sitting as a senator for the next 24 years, Pope was involved in many major decisions during his term, including a revision of the state constitution in 1968, improvements to deaf and blind schooling, and establishing a community college system. He was opposed to reapportionment and was a vehement advocate for the deaf and blind. Pope also led the senate on two occasions serving as the president pro tempore from 1964 to 1965 and the president of the senate from 1966 to 1968. His all-time goal in politics was to become Governor of Florida, preparing a run that was halted by the severe illness of his wife in 1960. Interestingly, had Robert King High, who died in August 1967, had been elected Governor in 1966, Pope, who was then serving as President of the Senate, would have become Acting Governor, as Florida law did not then provide for a Lieutenant Governor. Pope won awards for "The Most Valuable Member of the Legislature" in 1961 and "Third Most Valuable Member of the Senate" in 1967. He was diagnosed with bone cancer in 1972 and did not seek re-election to the senate that year, returning to a private insurance business.

== Personal life and death ==
In his spare time, he enjoyed hunting, fishing and golfing. Pope married a noted Floridian novelist, Edith Taylor Pope in 1933. Upon her death in 1961, he made several donations in her memory towards historic preservation and education in St. Augustine. One contribution supported the Historic St. Augustine Preservation Board's project of reconstructing the Pellicer-De Burgo House downtown. Pope died in July 1973 of the bone cancer previously diagnosed a year ago after weeks of deteriorating health, including losing his voice that he was once known for. Survivors included daughter, Mrs. Richard O. Watson; a sister, Mrs. Wanda Pope Wilson and a brother, Eugene "Neil" Pope of St. Augustine. His funeral of over 500 people was attended by many prominent Floridian politicians, including former governors Fuller Warren, Farris Bryant, Haydon Burns, Charley Johns, LeRoy Collins along with senator Lawton Chiles and then-governor Reubin Askew. He was later interred at Evergreen Cemetery in St. Augustine alongside his wife.

== Legacy ==
Known affectionately as "The Lion of St. Johns" from his white flowing hair and "roaring" speaking skills, Pope is known mostly for breaking the "rural hold" on the state legislature. On reflection of his senate career, he remarked "I didn't get much legislation passed but I sure helped get a lot of bad bills killed." Upon his death in 1973, many prominent state politicians paid tributes to him, among them, U.S. Senator Lawton Chiles stating that "His life was a beacon and standard to everyone of what a politician and public servant can be." Then-governor Reubin Askew also paid tribute, saying "Florida has lost one of its most dedicated sons and I have lost a dear friend who was almost like a father".

He was honored with a senate resolution in 1974. The school that his parents graduated from was also renamed "The Verle Allyn Pope School for the Deaf and Blind" in a unanimous resolution that same year.
