= Benet Store (St. Augustine) =

Coordinates: 29°53′44″N 81°18′47″W

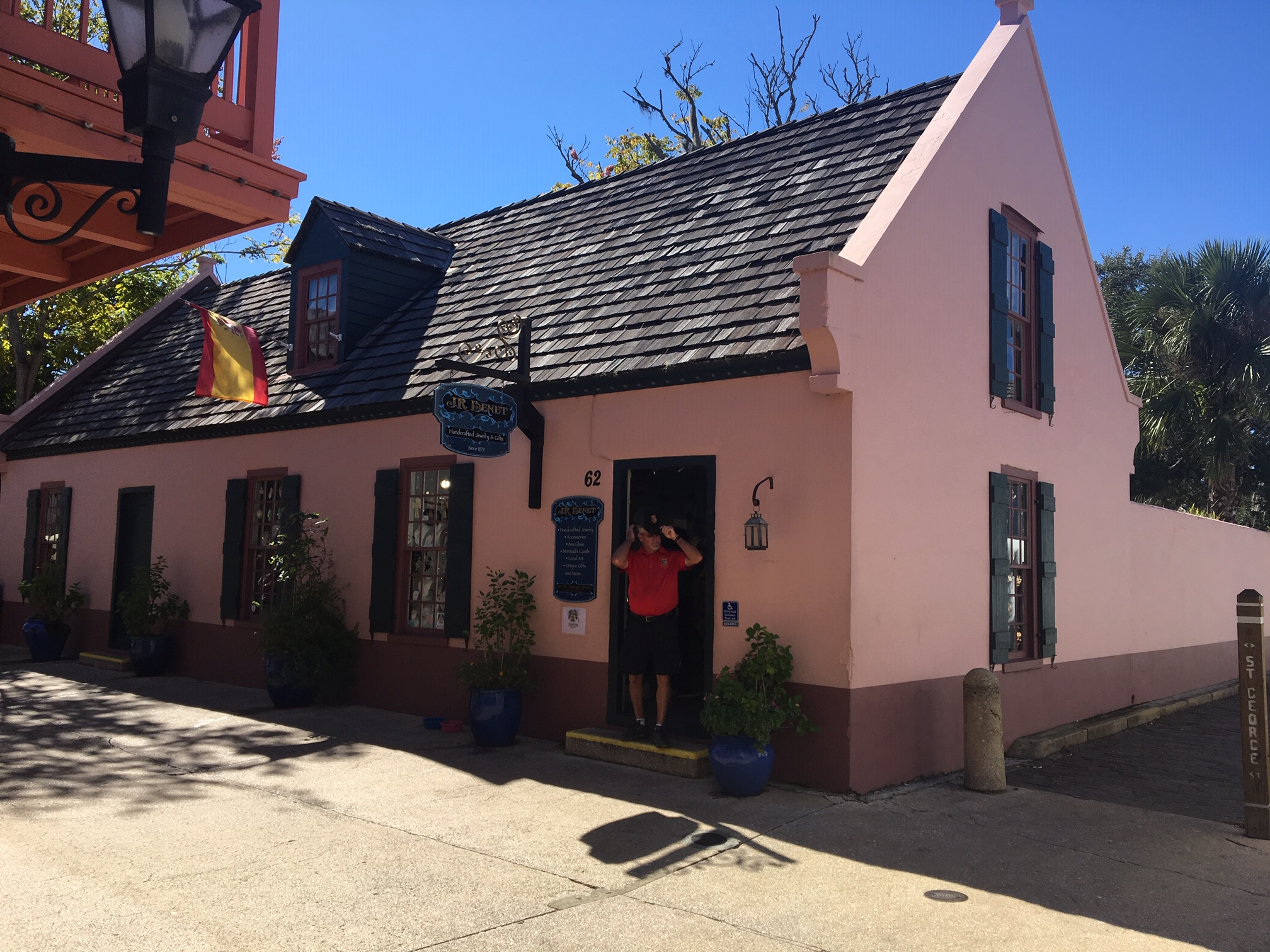
Benet Store, October 2018

The Benet Store is located at 62 St. George Street, St. Augustine, Florida. The building is within the territory of the St. Augustine Town Plan Historic District.

== Early Occupants ==
The first documented structure at this site appears on a 1765 map of the town. Later, a map of 1788 describes the house on this lot as a house of "wattle and daub in fair condition," owned by Matias Pons. It remained in his possession until he died in 1817, when his will described the property as a "stone and wood house with a store of victuals and provisions situated on St. George Street that goes to the Land Gate [present day City Gate] with its corresponding lot." The property continued in the hands of his heirs until Peter Benet purchased it in 1839.

== The Benet Family ==
Pedro Benet (widely known as "The King of the Minorcans" after the distinctive ethnic group that settled in St. Augustine in 1777) and his wife, Juana Hernández, had ten children, among whom was Joseph Ravina Benet who later assisted in store operations. Pedro Benet's application for leave to remove his retail liquor shop from the southeast (the current reconstructed Benet House) to the southwest corner of St. George and Cuna Streets is recorded in the City Council Minute Book of October 13, 1840.

Before Pedro Benet purchased 62 St. George Street from the Pons heirs, Benet operated his own store on the ground floor of his own house across the street, as evidenced through taxes he paid on stock at $16 per year for shop licenses. After Pedro Benet died in 1870, his son Joseph Ravina Benet held occupational licenses from 1871-1883 on the house. The licenses were usually listed for keeping a store, or for selling goods, wares, and merchandise. In 1872 Joseph Ravina Benet was able to procure a license to sell wine and malt liquors, and in 1882-1883 he was able to sell tobacco and cigars.

The general store remained in existence until the late 19th century, when a notice in an 1887 newspaper appeared ordering the sale of Pedro Benet's property.

The name Benet later became world-famous because of the writings of brothers Stephen Vincent Benet and William Rose Benet (both Pulitzer Prizewinning poets) and their sister Laura Benet, also a widely published author. The literary Benet siblings were the great-grandchildren of Pedro Benet and the grandchildren of Brigadier General Stephen Vincent Benet, the first West Point appointee from the new state of Florida in 1845 and a trusted advisor to Abraham Lincoln during the Civil War. A building at West Point is named in honor of General Benet. All three of the literary Benets spent time in St. Augustine in the 1940s.

The old Benet store was demolished on August 13, 1903, before Bernard A. Masters built a new building on the site.

== San Agustín Antiguo ==
In 1967, the Historic St. Augustine Preservation Board began reconstructing a building on the old foundations of the old Benet store using early photographs, historic research, and recollections of two surviving members of the Benet family. During the era of San Agustín Antiguo, a living history museum running the length of St. George Street, the Benet store was on display as a craft store and museum. It was reconstructed as a 19th-century general store; sausage stuffers, a cabbage shredder, an auger, hand wrought shears, and tongs hung from the ceiling. There were barrels of food throughout the store and announcements for ship arrivals into the port of St. Augustine lined the walls.

== Present Day ==
Today, the Benet store is retail space occupied by a jewelry store called J. R. Benet. The company, founded in 1979, makes handcrafted jewelry and gifts.
