= Government House (St. Augustine) =

Old gubernatorial residence of Florida

- U.S. National Register of Historic Places
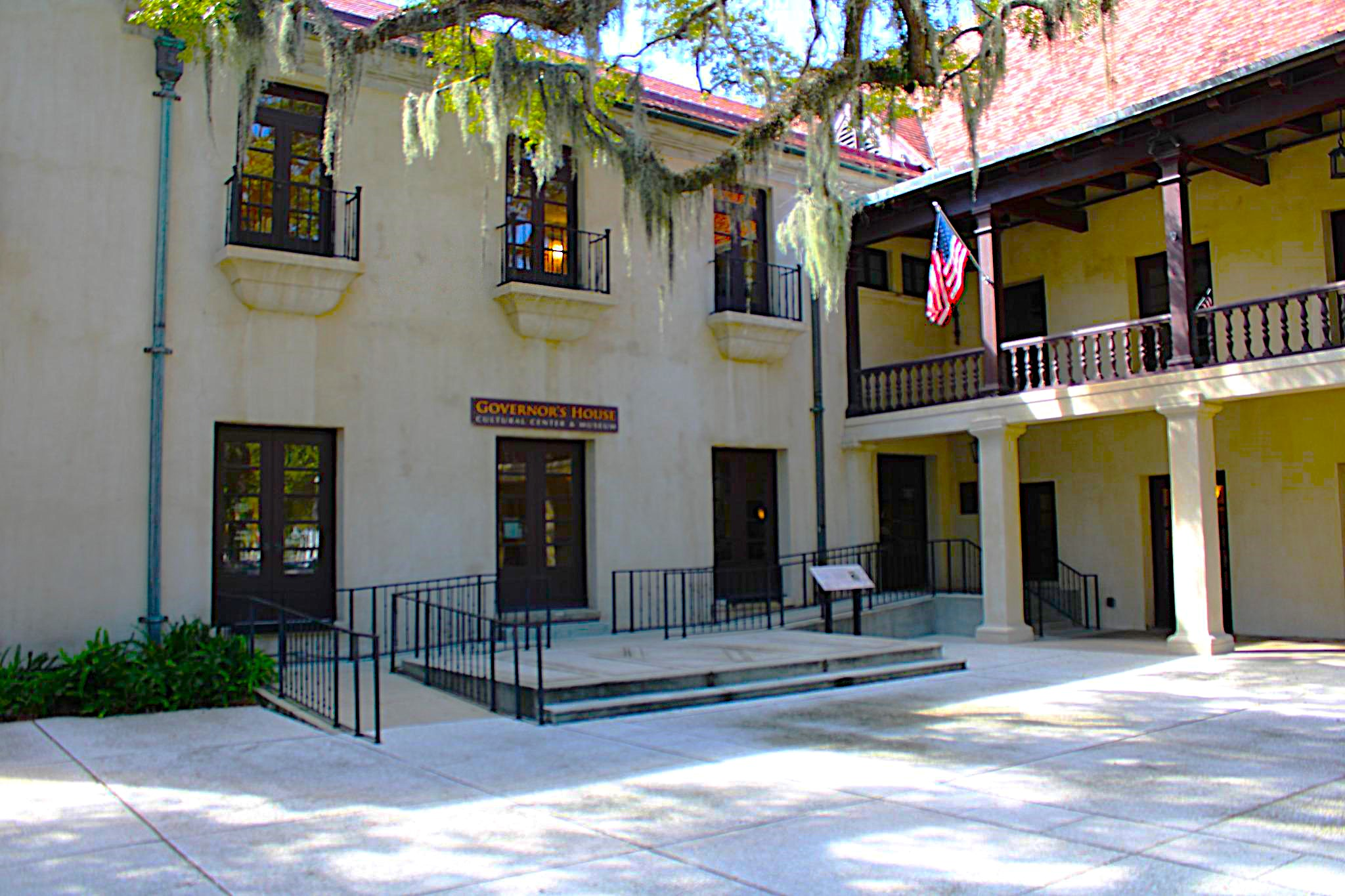
- Sept - 2024
- Location: 48 King St., St. Augustine, Florida
- Coordinates: 29°53′32″N 81°18′47″W
- NRHP reference No.: 13000812
- Added to NRHP: January 7, 2014

Government House (Spanish: Casa del gobierno), also known as Governor's House, is located at 48 King Street in St. Augustine, Florida, adjacent to the Plaza de la Constitución. The building, constructed of coquina, served as the governor's official residence from c. 1710 during the First Spanish Period (1565–1763), throughout the British Period (1763–1784), and until 1812 in the Second Spanish Period (1784–1821). Governor Gonzalo Méndez de Canzo was the first governor to build his residence on the present Government House site in 1598.

A new structure was built on the site in 1706 for use as a residence, office, courthouse, and the social center of the town. The east wing of the present building dates to the original construction between 1706 and 1713. Due to the 1763 Treaty of Paris, Florida passed into British ownership. During the British Period, the house was the official residence of James Grant, the British royal governor of East Florida (1764–1771). Among his guests were American explorer Daniel Boone, who was in East Florida to inquire about land purchases, and Patrick Tonyn, who was appointed as Grant's successor.

At the close of the American Revolution, Florida and St. Augustine were returned to Spain by the 1783 Treaty of Paris. General Nathanael Greene visited Government House in 1784, hosted for an elaborate seven-course meal by Governor Vicente Manuel de Zéspedes. From 1785–87 the governor’s residence again underwent major renovation. The last governor to use the house was Enrique White during the Second Spanish Period; he died in 1811.

By the time Florida was annexed by the United States in 1821, the building was in ruins with only the walls remaining. In 1833–34 Government House was rebuilt with federal funds, following plans drawn up by architect Robert Mills, later famous for designing the Washington Monument. The structure incorporated existing walls and contained 16 rooms, including space for a post office, a courtroom, and other federal functions. During the American Civil War federal troops were headquartered in the building.

In 1873 another major remodeling took place, using plans by architect William M. Kimball. Through the next 60 years the post office and customs house gradually took over more and more of the building as the town grew. In 1937, Government House was once again renovated by Jacksonville architect Mellen Clark Greeley as a Works Progress Administration (WPA) project. The U.S. Postal Service continued to use the building until 1965, when a new post office building was constructed. Government House was transferred to the State of Florida in February 1966 as a public monument to be administered by the St. Augustine Historical Restoration and Preservation Commission (later renamed the Historic St. Augustine Preservation Board).

The Historic St. Augustine Preservation Board used the 1937 wing of the building for a research library, archaeological and curatorial laboratories, and historical displays until the board became defunct in 1997. Today, the ground floor of the building is open to the public as Governor’s House Cultural Center and Museum, managed by UF Historic St. Augustine, Inc. A research library managed by the George A. Smathers Libraries at the University of Florida is housed on the second floor.

During their tour of St. Augustine on April 1, 2001, King Juan Carlos and Queen Sofía of Spain made a public appearance on the east balcony of Government House. King Felipe VI and Queen Letizia of Spain also visited Government House on September 17, 2015.

Government House was added to the National Register of Historic Places on January 7, 2014.

== Governor's House: University of Florida Library ==
The Governor’s House Library was created initially by the St. Augustine Historical Restoration and Preservation Commission, which later became the Historic St. Augustine Preservation Board. Their library grew as an academic foundation for the interpretational work of the HSAPB. Information about how houses were constructed historically, how they were furnished, who lived in them, and the daily work and recreation in colonial times were all subjects of research for the HSAPB staff. The collection they developed included books, photographs, maps, and archival documents. The library’s collection quickly grew to include a wide variety of artifacts, from tools to textiles, artwork to furniture, and everything in between.

The State abolished the HSAPB in 1997, and the City of St. Augustine assumed control of the historic properties. For over ten years, the research library in Governor’s House (also known as Government House) was operated by the City of St. Augustine Department of Historic Preservation and Heritage Tourism. In 2010 the State once again took over stewardship, and the management of the historic properties, including Governor’s House and its library, became the responsibility of the University of Florida Historic St. Augustine, Inc.

Governor's House Library is managed jointly by UF Historic St. Augustine, Inc., and the UF George A. Smathers Libraries with the mission of preserving and providing access to the historical resources that enhance our understanding and appreciation of the St. Augustine's built heritage. Primarily created by a defunct state agency, the Historic St. Augustine Preservation Board, the collections in the Governor's House Library document the city's built environment and provide invaluable historical information about the city and its inhabitants through time.

The Research Collection contains archaeology records, historical research, interpretive material, and administrative files that were both collected and created by the Historic St. Augustine Preservation Board in their efforts to reconstruct Spanish Colonial properties in St. Augustine. These records provide us with contextual information that helps us better understand the changes made to St. Augustine's streetscape over time. A detailed list of the archival records in the library's holdings is available to view on the website.

== Governor's House Library History ==
In 1870, a man by the name of John L. Wilson began negotiations with the government in order to operate a free public library in two rooms of the U.S. Customs House. The governor's house officially became home to the oldest library in Florida when Wilson was granted permission in 1874. After twenty-one years, the library eventually moved to a larger space in 1895 at the Wilson's new property located at 12 Aviles Street, St. Augustine, Florida (known as the Segui-Kirby Smith House).
