= William Watson House =

- U.S. Historic district – Contributing property
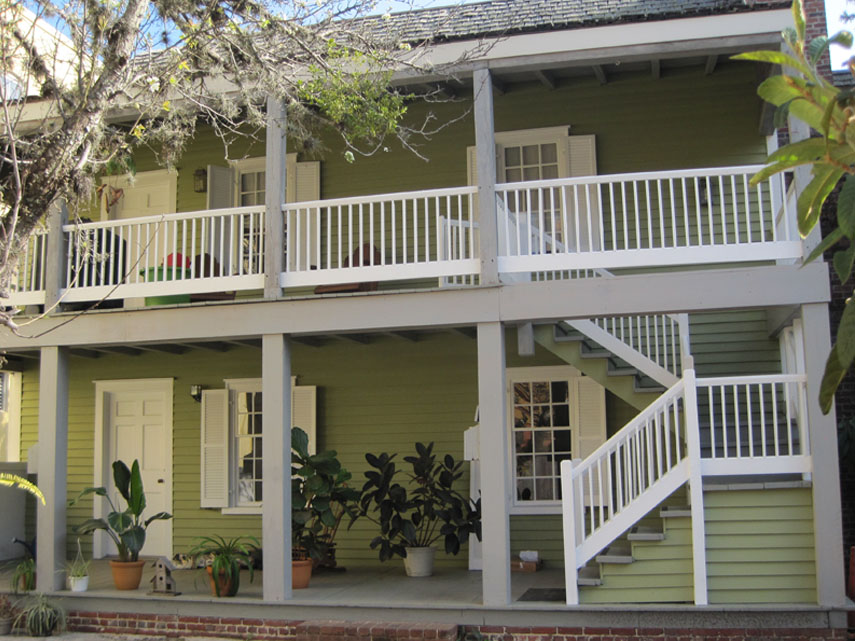
- William Watson House, 2018

- Location within Florida
- Location: 206 Charlotte St; St. Augustine, Florida
- Coordinates: 29°54′54″N 81°18′44″W
- Built: 1968
- Architectural style: British Colonial
- Part of: St. Augustine Town Plan Historic District (ID70000847)

The William Watson House is located at 206 Charlotte Street in St. Augustine, Florida. It is a reconstructed property representing the architecture of St. Augustine's British Period (1763-1784).

== William Watson ==
William Watson was a Scottish carpenter employed by Andrew Turnbull, the Scottish physician who started the New Smyrna colony in East Florida in 1768. Watson was first hired in London to oversee the carpenters who would eventually build Turnbull's plantation buildings. Watson built Turnbull's own house four miles north of the colony's harbor. By 1777 he had built 145 house valued at 45 pounds each, using frame construction.

As lead carpenter, he was labeled as an overseer and was allegedly a harsh taskmaster. He eventually moved to St. Augustine and lived next door to Father Pedro Camps, to whom he charged the task of selling his property when he and the British left St. Augustine at the end of St. Augustine's British Period. In St. Augustine he practiced his craftsmanship by purchasing and renovating homes. In this manner, he earned his wealth, became a rich planter, and established an estate on the property.

== History ==
William Watson bought the property where his house in downtown St. Augustine later stood in 1779 from James Penman, a British attorney and friend of Andrew Turnbull who left East Florida following a series of disputes with then Governor Patrick Tonyn. On this land he converted a large stable building into a seven-room convalescent home. He also built a two-story wooden framed house where he and his family lived. Their residence in the house was short lived; when Spain regained Florida from England in 1783, Watson and his family returned to England. All of the properties he owned around St. Augustine were left to Father Pedro Camps. The Watson House became the property of Martín Mateo Hernández, a young Minorcan immigrant under the Father's care.

After the heirs of Martín Hernández died in 1802, the Watson House became part of the Spanish Military Hospital complex on what is now Aviles Street, serving as the apothecary. It is believed that the house burned down in St. Augustine's fire of 1887. Sanborn Fire Insurance Maps show the lot empty from 1894 to 1899, when a stable building was constructed on the property.

The Historic St. Augustine Preservation Board reconstructed the Watson House in 1968 as an example of British Period architecture. Today it serves as residential property for University of Florida Historic St. Augustine, Inc. (UFHSA).
