= St. Augustine Town Plan Historic District =

Historic district in Florida, United States

- St Augustine Town Plan Historic District
- U.S. National Register of Historic Places
- U.S. National Historic Landmark District
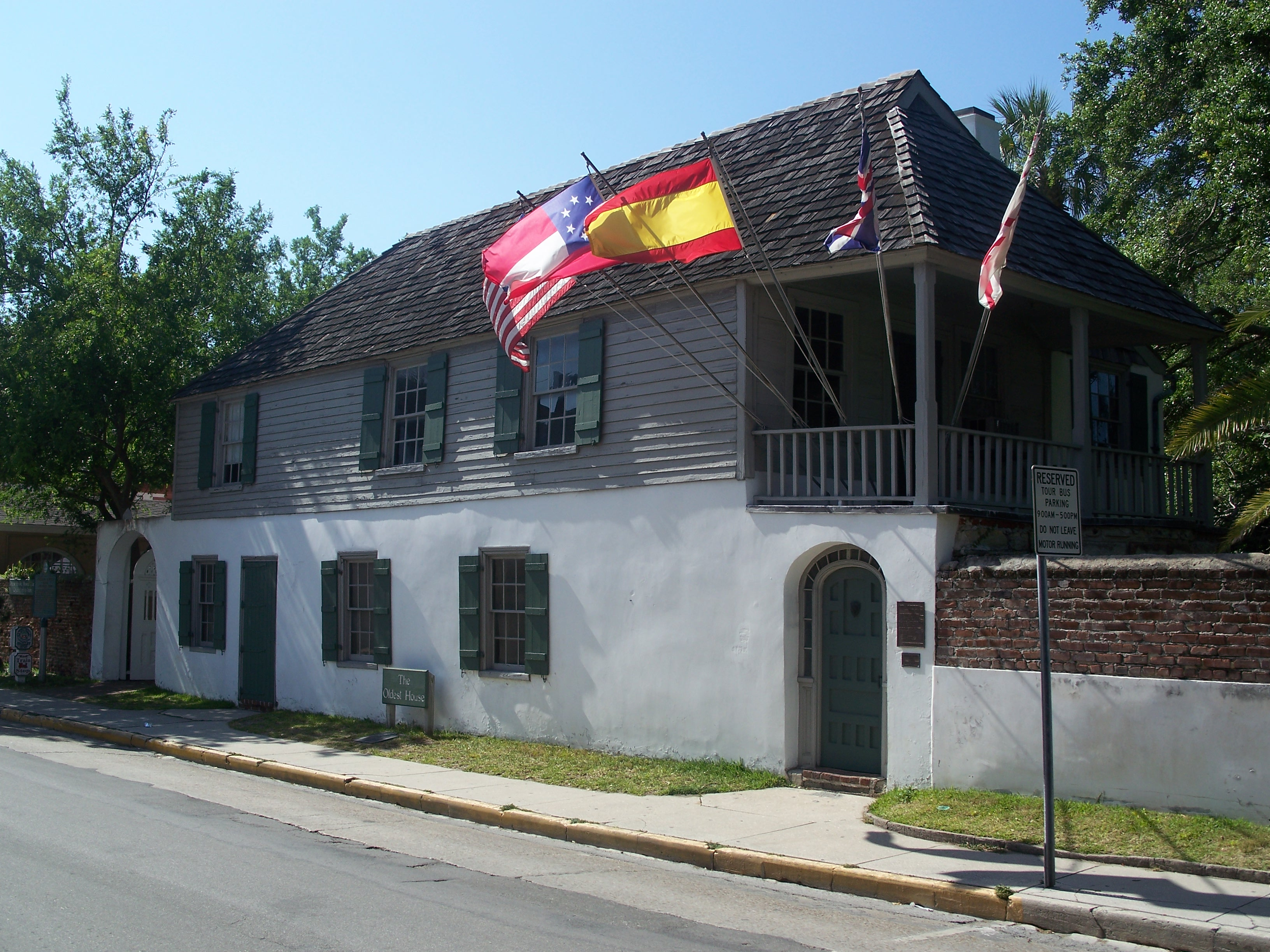
- Gonzalez-Alvarez House, an NHL itself and contributing property to the district

- Location within Florida Location within the United States
- Location: Roughly bounded by Grove Ave, the Matanzas River, and South and Washington Sts., St. Augustine, Florida
- Coordinates: 29°53′31″N 81°18′51″W
- Area: 113 acres (46 ha)
- NRHP reference No.: 70000847

Significant dates
- Added to NRHP: April 15, 1970
- Designated NHLD: April 15, 1970

The St Augustine Town Plan Historic District is a U.S. National Historic Landmark District encompassing the colonial heart of the city. It substantially encompasses the street plan of the city as contained within the bounds of walls (no longer standing) built between the 16th and early 19th centuries. The district is bounded by Cordova, Orange, and St. Francis Streets, and Matanzas Bay. It was designated a National Historic Landmark in 1970, although its boundaries were not formally defined until 1986.

== Description and history ==
St. Augustine, founded by Spain in 1565, is the oldest permanent European settlement on the mainland of North America, north of Mexico. Its long colonial history extends to 1822, when Spanish East Florida was annexed to the United States as part of the Florida Territory. The city core's street plan, with narrow streets, dates to the first period of Spanish control, which ended in 1763 with the cession of Florida to Great Britain. Britain returned Florida to Spain in 1784. Roughly half of the area's buildings were built before 1925, with a substantially large number in either Spanish Colonial or Moorish Revival styles.

== Landmarks ==
Some of the most distinctive of the city's landmarks are located in the district, and have their origins in the Spanish settlement. Construction of the Castillo de San Marcos, located at the northeastern end of the district, began with the community's founding, and the central plaza was also an early defining feature. The plaza is now faced by the Cathedral Basilica of St. Augustine, built during the second Spanish period in 1793–94, and by a 1930s post office that was designed to strongly resemble the original Spanish governor's palace, which it replaced. Further south in the district stand a cluster of some of the city's oldest surviving residences, including the c. 1723 González–Alvarez House (a.k.a. the Oldest House, the oldest surviving house in the city) and the Llambias House.

== Other contributing properties ==
- Benet Store
- Blacksmith Shop
- Florida Heritage House (Wakeman House)
- Gallegos House
- Gómez House
- Gonzáles and De Hita Houses
- Luciano de Herrera House
- Oliveros House
- Pellicer-De Burgo House
- Ponce de Leon Hotel
- Ribera House
- Rodríguez House
- Salcedo House & Kitchen
- Santoyo House
- Sims Silversmith Shop
- Spanish Military Hospital Museum
- Triay House
- Wells Print Shop
- William Watson House

== Gallery ==
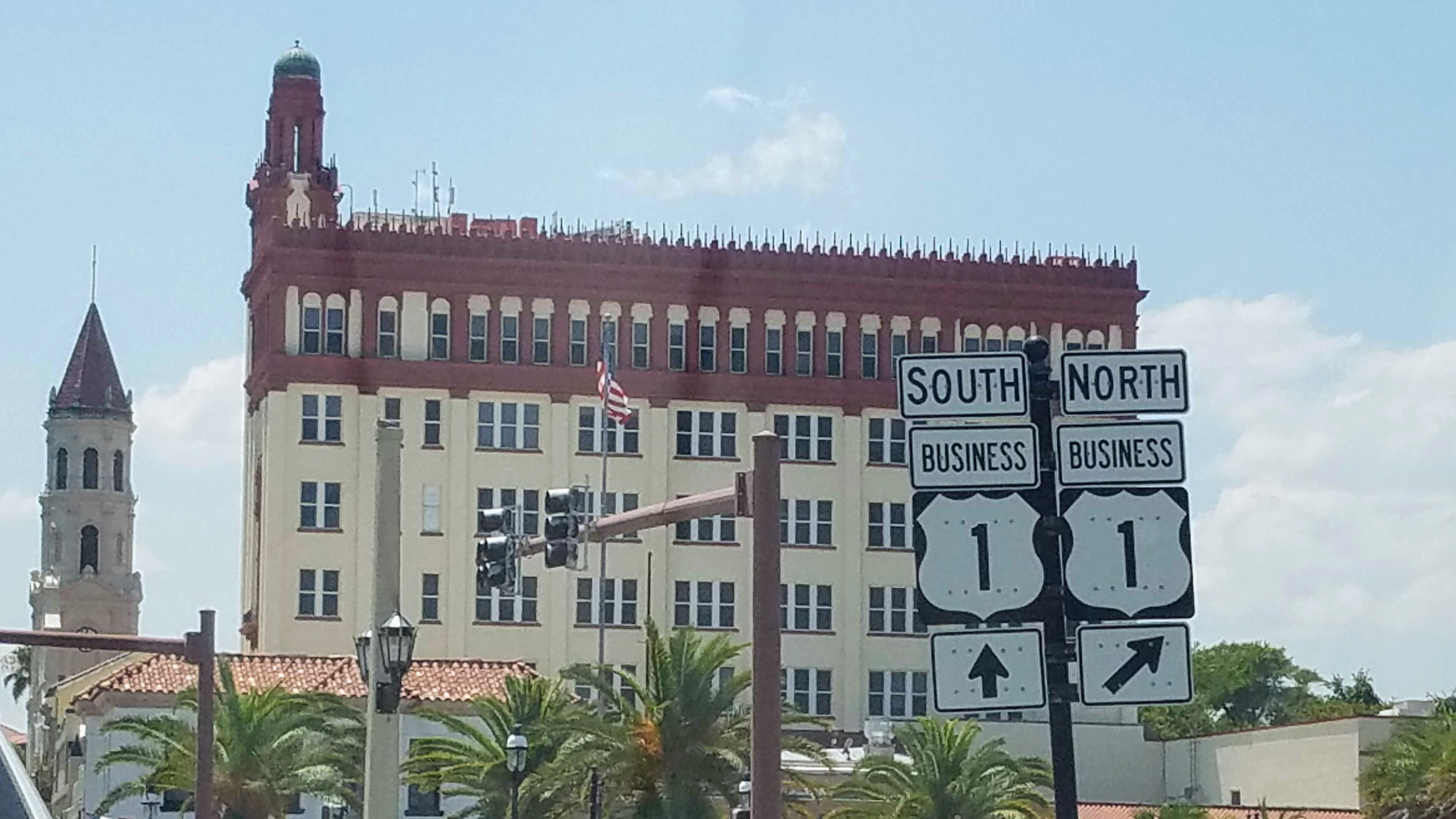
Atlantic Bank Building - May 2019

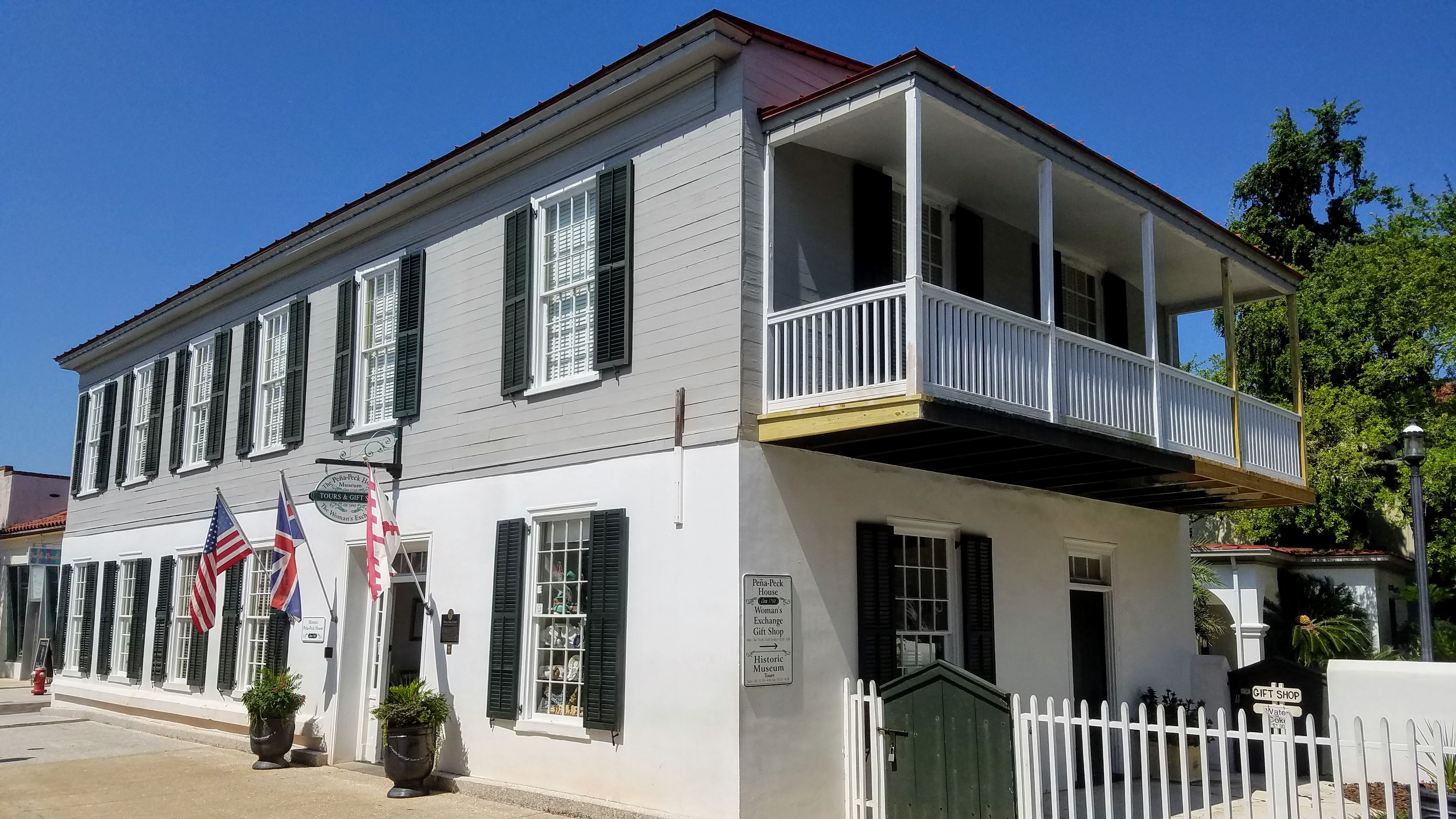
Pena-Peck House - May 2019

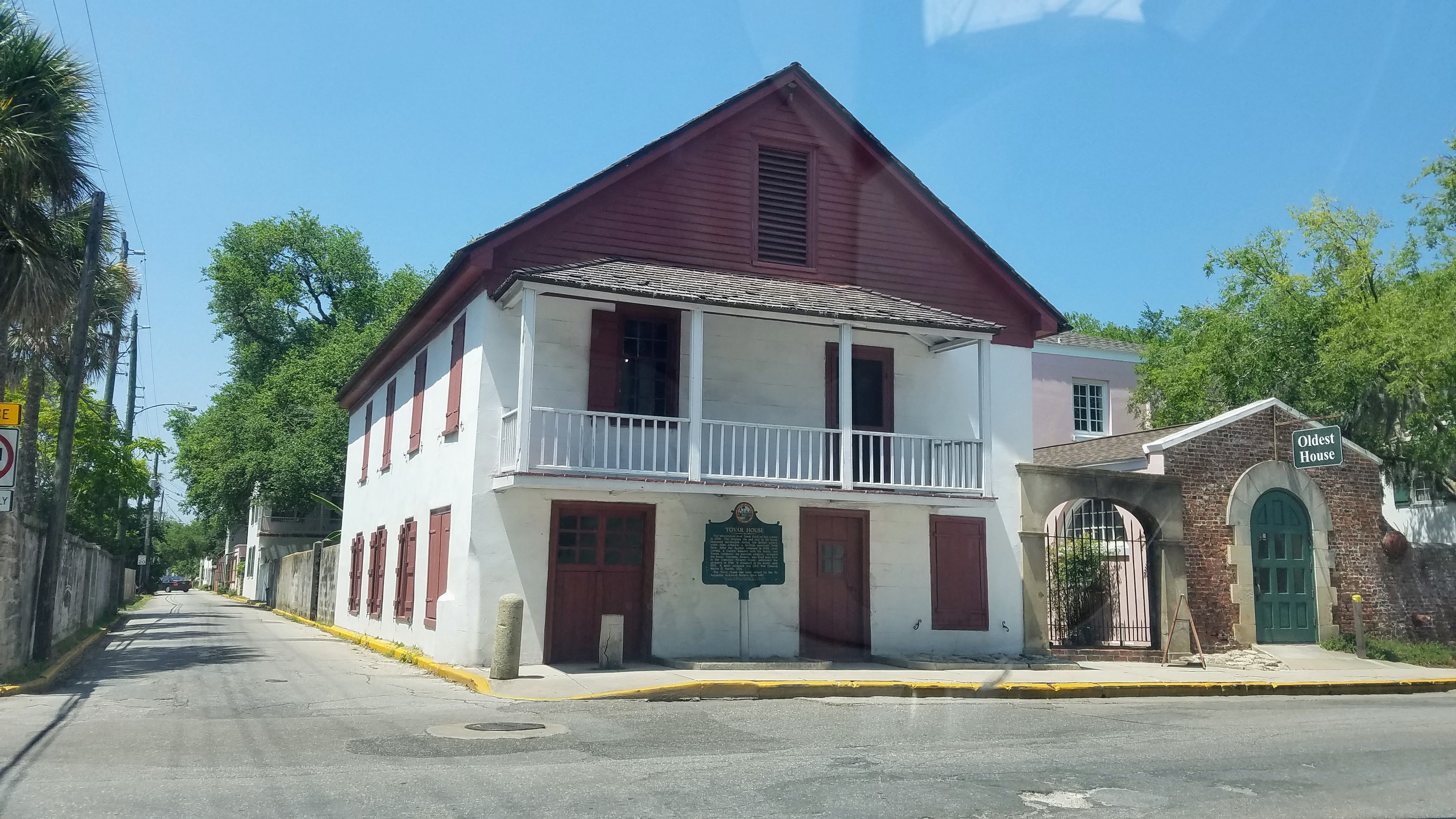
Tovar House - May 2019

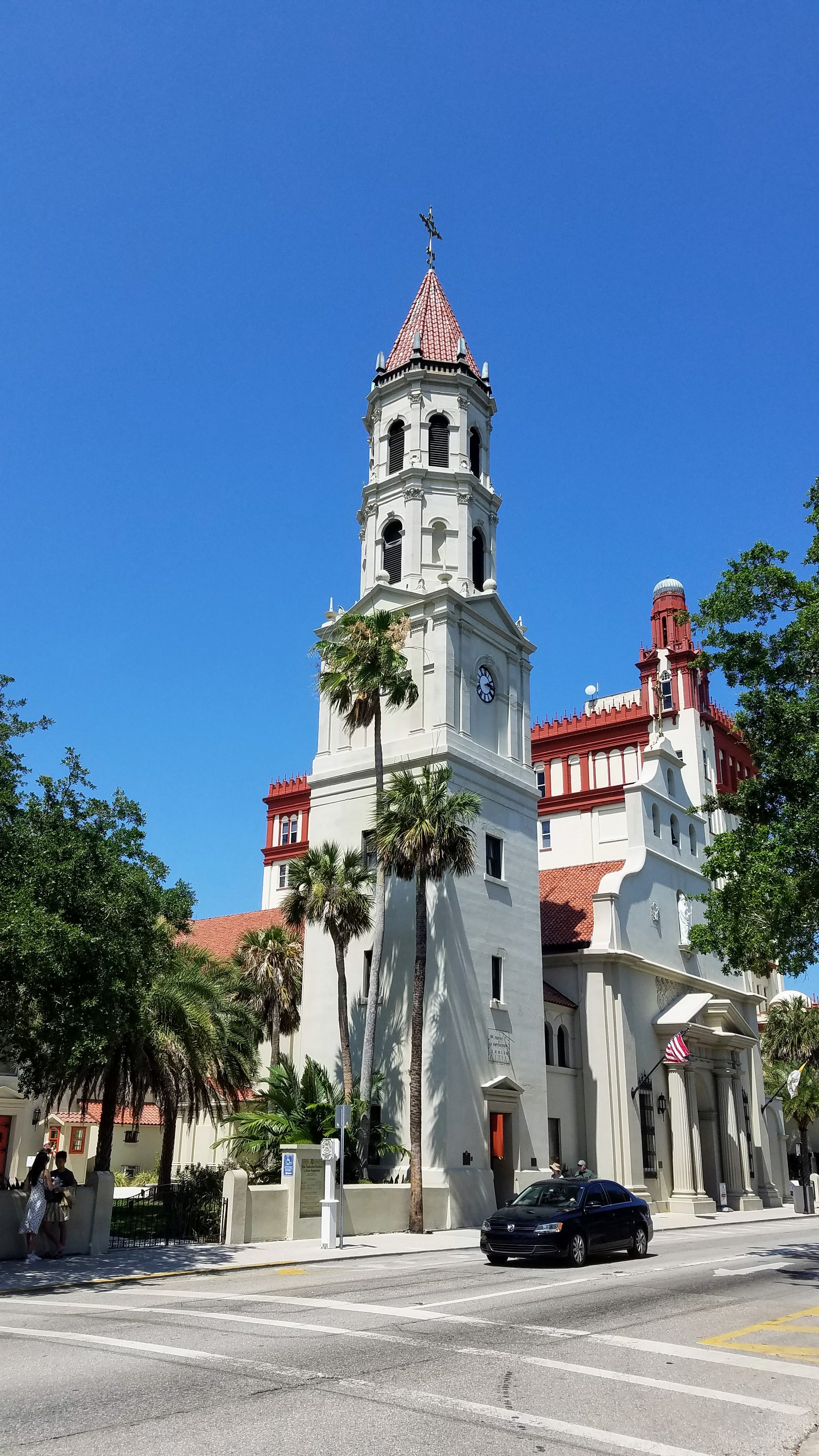
St. Augustine Cathedral - May 2019

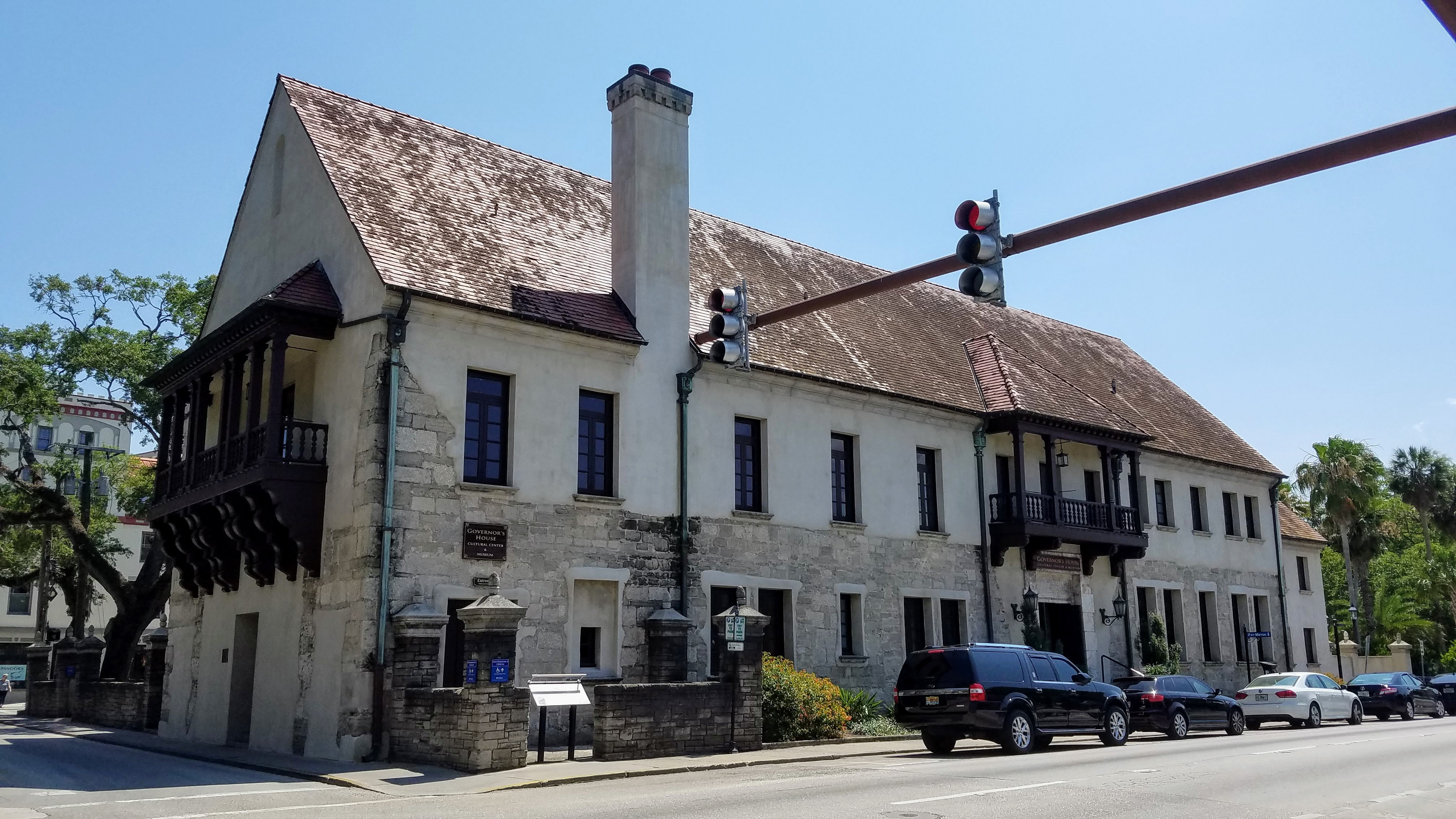
Government House - May 2019

== See also ==
- List of National Historic Landmarks in Florida
- National Register of Historic Places listings in St. Johns County, Florida
