= Santoyo House (St. Augustine) =

- U.S. Historic district – Contributing property
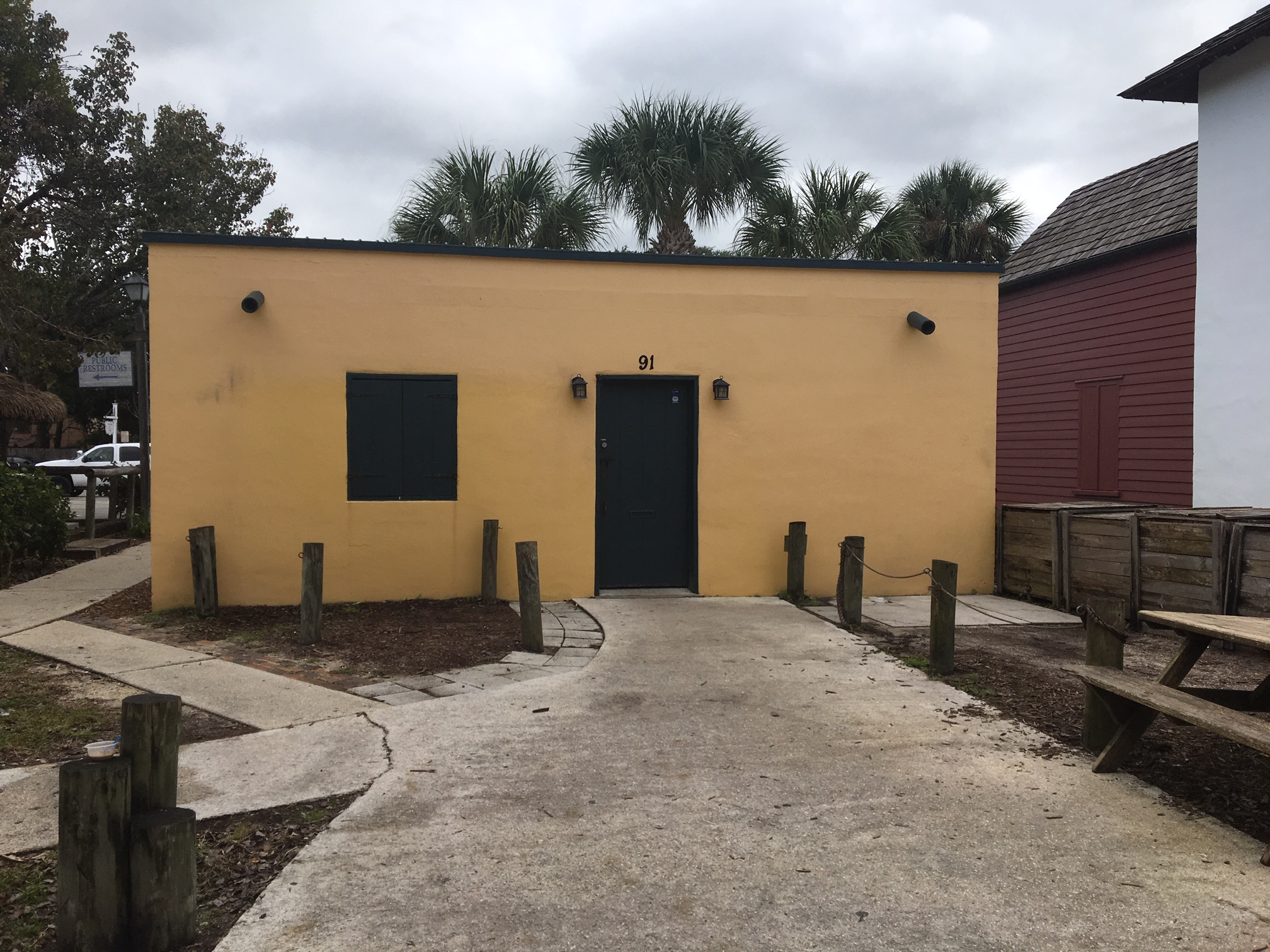
- Santoyo House, 2018

- Location within Florida
- Location: 91 St George Street, St. Augustine, Florida
- Coordinates: 29°54′54″N 81°18′44″W
- Built: 1966
- Architectural style: Spanish Colonial
- Part of: St. Augustine Town Plan Historic District (ID70000847)

The Santoyo House is located at 91 St. George Street, St. Augustine, Florida. It is a reconstruction of a First Spanish Period (1565-1763) house in Florida.

== History ==
A 1764 Spanish map indicates that there was a one-story flat-roofed house at this site made of tabby and plaster coating, belonging to Miguel Santoyo, a soldier at the Castillo de San Marcos. Miguel Santoyo was the son of Juan de la Rosa Santoya and Maria Ana Cavallero. Miguel, his father, and his brother were all soldiers at the Castillo. Miguel belonged to a regiment of dragoons. The floor of his home was most likely wooden or earthen and he had no loggia or porch, common in Spanish architecture, connected to his dwelling

The 1763 Treaty of Paris ceded Florida to Great Britain and Jesse Fish, British agent, sold the house in 1769 to a George Kemp, surgeon and a member of the British General Assembly in East Florida. The home was most likely destroyed at some point during St. Augustine's British Period (1763-1783) for use of materials. 1917 Sanborn Insurance maps show that there was later a two-story brick building on this location that was used as retail space until it was torn down in the 1960s for the reconstruction of many of St. Augustine's historic buildings.

== Reconstruction ==
In 1966 the St. Augustine Restoration Foundation Inc. purchased the Miguel Santoyo lot and reconstructed a house to its 1760s appearance.

== Present day ==
Today the Santoyo House is retail space operated by Playa Bowls owners Mark Williams and Richard Hardman. The property is owned by St. Augustine Foundation, Inc.
