= Wells Print Shop =

- U.S. Historic district – Contributing property
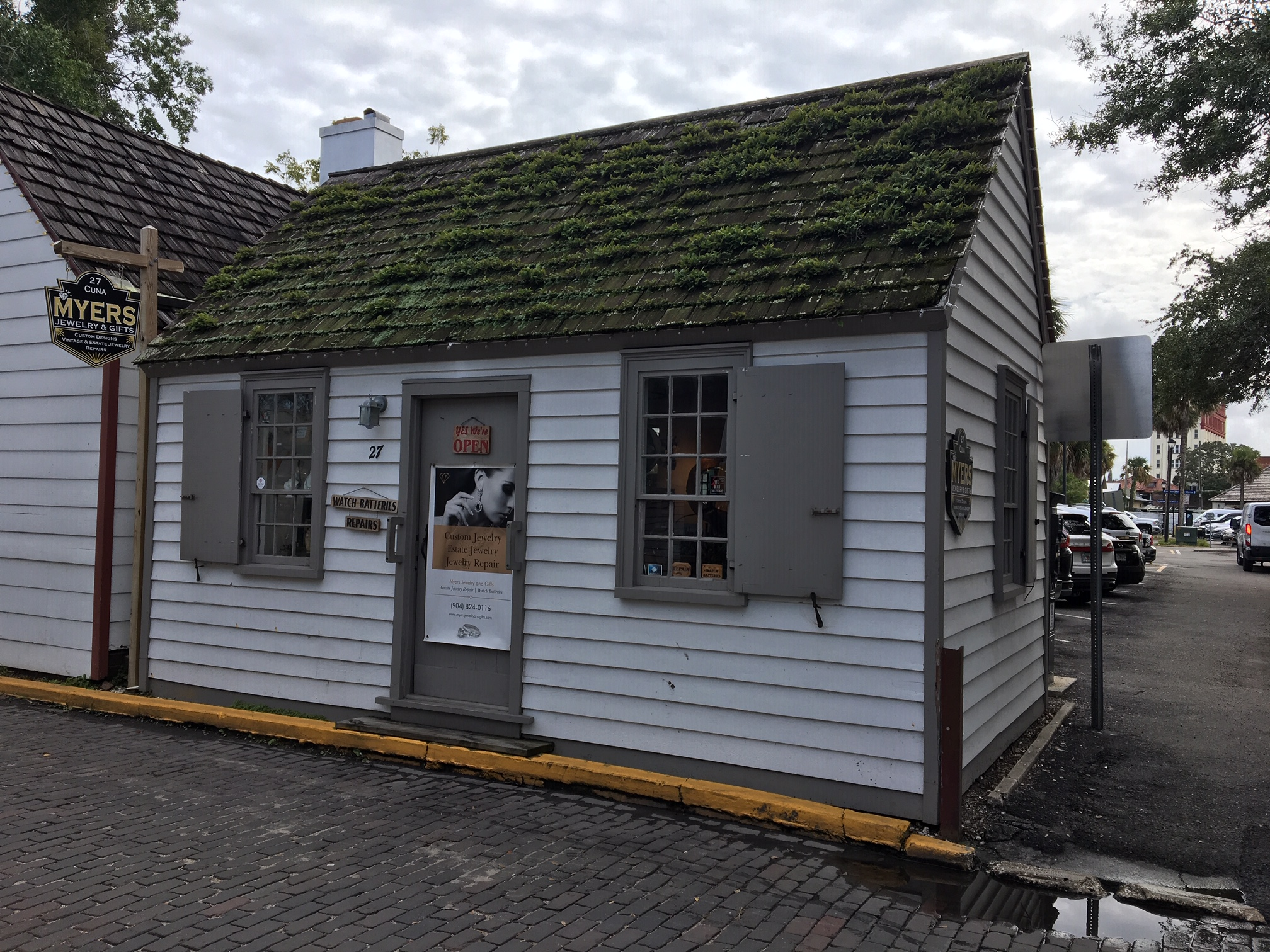
- Wells Print Shop, 2018

- Location within Florida
- Location: 27 Cuna St; St. Augustine, Florida
- Coordinates: 29°54′54″N 81°18′44″W
- Built: 1968
- Architectural style: British Colonial
- Part of: St. Augustine Town Plan Historic District (ID70000847)

The Wells Print Shop was located at 27 Cuna Street in St. Augustine, Florida. It operated as part of the Historic St. Augustine Preservation Board's 18th century museum village, San Agustín Antiguo, demonstrating the colonial printmaking process.

== William Wells ==
William Charles Wells was born in 1757 in Charleston, South Carolina, the son of a Tory printer, publisher, and bookseller. He was formally trained as a doctor, receiving a degree in medicine from the University of Edinburgh in 1780. When the British left Charleston in 1782, William and his brother John moved to St. Augustine where they established a print shop. In St. Augustine the Wells brothers are most well known for publishing the East Florida Gazette, the first newspaper in Florida. After the 1783 Treaty of Paris returned Florida to the Spanish, William Wells went to England and practiced medicine for the rest of his life. He died in London in 1817.

== East Florida Gazette ==
The Wells brothers' publication began on February 1, 1783 and lasted a little over one year, with the last issue published on March 22, 1784. London's Public Record Office only contains three issues of the newspaper, those from March 1, May 3, and May 17, 1783. The St. Augustine Historical Society resurrected the name "East Florida Gazette" with its newsletter, which is indexed on the Historical Society Research Library's online catalog.

== History ==
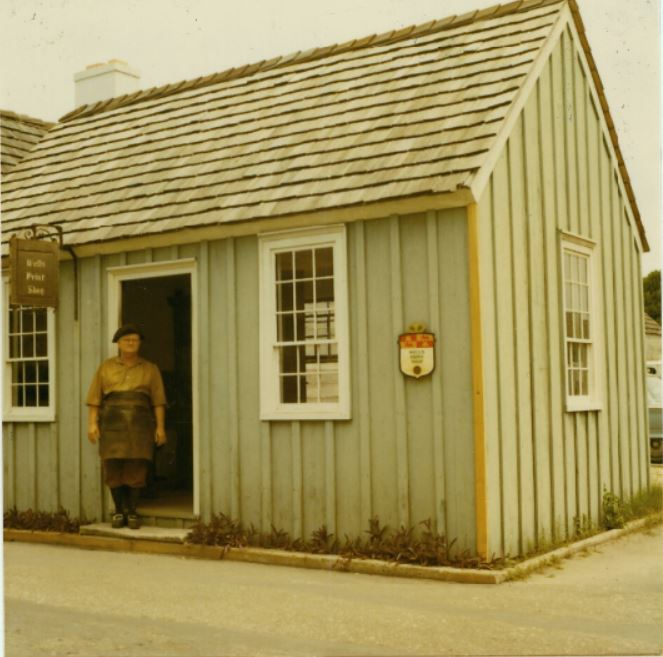
Wells Print Shop, 1971

The Historic St. Augustine Preservation Board reconstructed the Wells Print Shop in 1968 on Cuna Street. The original Wells printing press owned by William and John was located on Treasury Lane. The all-wooden shop was constructed using board-and-batten building method, which the British settlers in St. Augustine preferred for its quick construction and ease of repair. The building is 220 square feet.

Inside the print shop was a replica of the type of printing press used towards the end of the 18th century. The press was operated daily to demonstrate the printing process to visitors, but the Preservation Board also used it to make reproductions of historic St. Augustine maps and replicas of the East Florida Gazette, which were sold as souvenirs.

Today the site once occupied by the Wells Print Shop operates as a jewelry store.
