= Florida Heritage House (Wakeman House) =

- Wakeman House
- U.S. Historic district – Contributing property
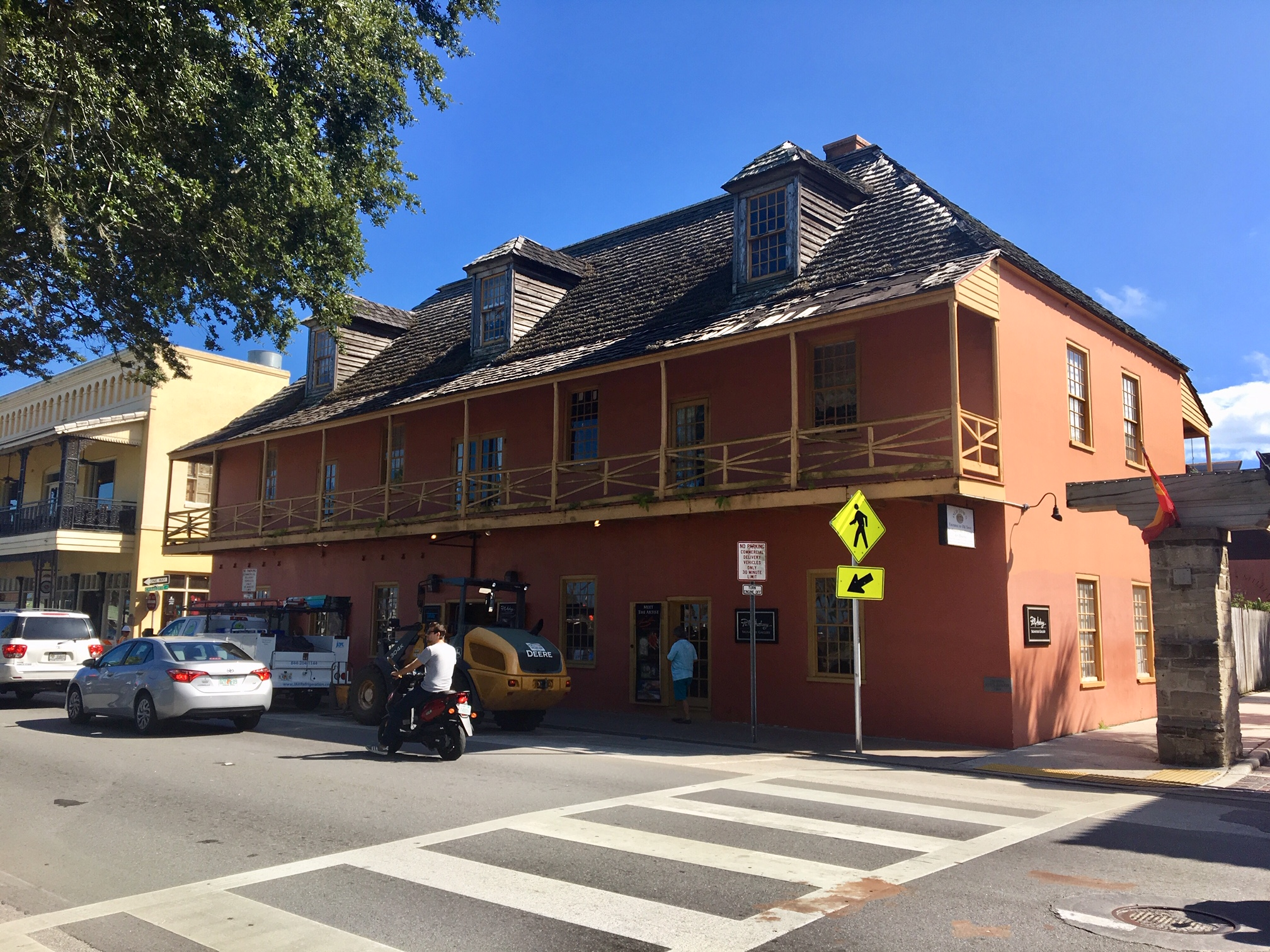
- Wakeman, 2018

- Location within Florida
- Location: 11 King Street; St. Augustine, Florida
- Coordinates: 29°54′54″N 81°18′44″W
- Built: 1964
- Architectural style: Spanish Colonial
- Part of: St. Augustine Town Plan Historic District (ID70000847)

The Florida Heritage House (or the Wakeman House) is located at 1 Aviles Street, or 11 King Street, in St. Augustine, Florida. It is a reconstruction of a late Spanish colonial-style house built in the 19th century.

== History ==
Archaeological excavations in the 1970s showed the site of the Wakeman House to hold burials dating back to the 16th century. These burials were located near the Catholic church of the time. A further excavation from 1972 showed burials dating back to the 18th century at this site, which could have been linked to the nearby Spanish Military Hospital, just south of the Wakeman House.

Around 1852, a structure was built on this site known as the City Hotel, owned by Seth M. Wakeman, a merchant from Connecticut who also operated a grocery store in it. A photograph taken during the Civil War shows us that the Wakeman House was occupied by Union soldiers during that time. There is a photograph from the 1880s that shows Wakeman's building functioning as a store.

The 1884 Sanborn Insurance Map depicts a three-story dry-goods store and a "Gentleman's Store" on this site that was out of business by 1888. By 1893 it was a veneered concrete building known as Lynn's Hotel, which was the Chautauqua Hotel by 1910.

== Restoration ==
In 1964, leading up to St. Augustine's planned quadricentennial celebrations, the state of Florida approved a loan for the erection of a Florida exhibition center at this site. The building on site at the time was known as the Bernstein Building. The St. Augustine Historical Restoration and Preservation Commission would purchase the building with this loan and a reconstruction of the Wakeman House was completed in 1965.

The Florida Heritage House displayed exhibits on American Indian cultures, Florida's Seminole Wars, and Spanish colonial life in St. Augustine. Artifacts from archaeological excavations supplemented the exhibits. There was also a showcase that displayed the gifts presented to the city of St. Augustine on behalf of Spanish governmental agencies.

== Present Day ==
Today the Florida Heritage House (Wakeman House) is an art gallery in downtown St. Augustine.
