= Colonial Quarter =

Coordinates: 29.8966°N 81.3131°W

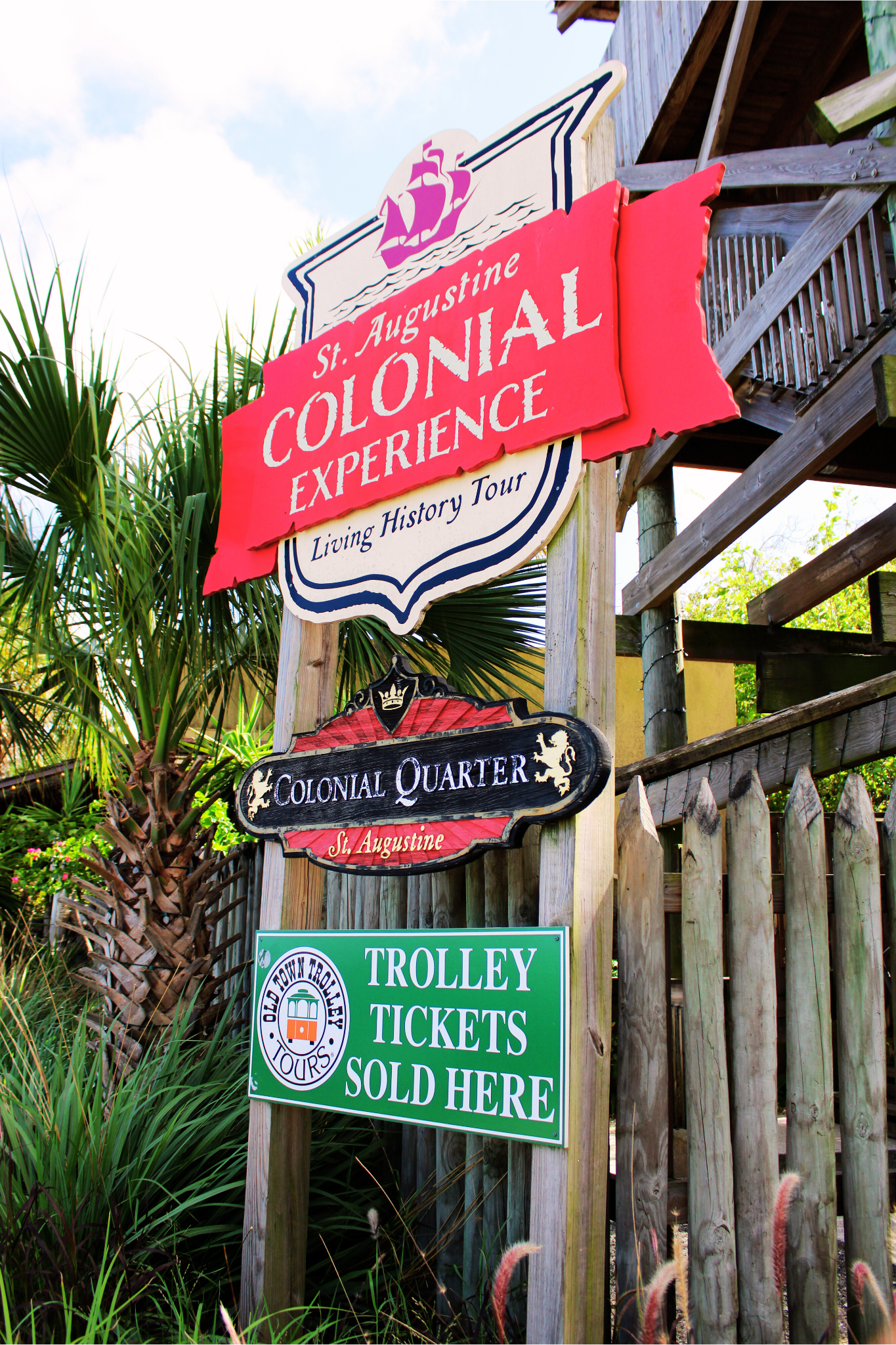
- Entrance of the Colonial Quarter, September 2024
- Interactive map of Colonial Quarter
- Location: 29 St. George St., St. Augustine, Florida 32085
- Operator: Colonial Quarter, LLC

The Colonial Quarter (previously known as the Colonial Spanish Quarter) is a site in St. Augustine, Florida. After an extensive multimillion-dollar renovation completed in three months, the site opened as the Colonial Quarter in March 2013.

== History of Colonial Spanish Quarter ==
In 1963 the Colonial Spanish Quarter was opened as a living museum depicting life in St Augustine in the 1740s. In the 1740s Spain ruled the area and St. Augustine was occupied mostly by persons born in Spain or of Spanish ancestry. This living history museum operated until fall 2011 on a 2-acre (8,100 m^{2}) site owned by the University of Florida and managed by the City of St. Augustine.

== Colonial Quarter Rebranding Project ==
In September 2012, Colonial Quarter LLC, owned by Pat Croce, who also owns the adjacent St. Augustine Pirate & Treasure Museum, and the University of Florida signed an agreement allowing Colonial Quarter LLC to operate the site.

Work began on the site, renamed Colonial Quarter, dropping "Spanish" from the name. By November 2012 a sign outside the site announced the project would open in spring 2013, which it did on March 16, 2013. Since then, the Colonial Quarter has become one of the city's premier live music venues. Noted for its outdoor stage and open area picnic table seating covered with trees and lit by lanterns, local bands perform here nightly.
