= University of Florida Historic St. Augustine, Inc. =

Institute in Florida, USA

University of Florida Historic St. Augustine
- Company type: Subsidiary
- Industry: Preservation
- Founded: December 2010
- Headquarters: Government House, St. Augustine, Fla., USA
- Key people: Ed Poppell
- Parent: University of Florida
- Website: staugustine.ufl.edu/

University of Florida Historic St. Augustine, Inc. (UFHSA) is located at 48 King Street in St. Augustine, Florida (the location of Government House). University of Florida encourages UFHSA to preserve and interpret state owned properties in St. Augustine that will in turn satisfy and support state needs of professionals in historic preservation, archaeology, cultural resources management, cultural tourism, history, and museum administration. UFHSA also seeks to meet the needs of locals in the state of Florida and in the city of St. Augustine, supporting educational internships and practicums.

== History ==
The ground work that led to UFHSA began in 2007 with the enactment of Chapter 267.1735 F.S. This Florida statute outlined goals, contracts, and duties for historic preservation professionals in St. Augustine. The University of Florida assumed management responsibilities for some historic properties downtown. In 2009, UF developed a strategic plan that laid foundations for property use, visitor experience, interpretive exhibits, educational programming, and collaborative planning with the City of St. Augustine. In 2010, UF received additional funding to upkeep and manage these historic properties from the State of Florida through recurring Plant Operation and Maintenance (PO&M) funds. To oversee the earlier strategic plan, University of Florida Historic St. Augustine, Inc. was formed in December 2010 and is a Direct Support Organization (DSO).

== Present Day ==
UFHSA currently operates the website http://staugustine.ufl.edu/index.html. The organization partners with City of St. Augustine, St. Johns County, the St. Augustine Historical Society, Flagler College, the Visitors and Convention Bureau, the Castillo de San Marcos, and the Colonial Quarter.

== See also ==
- William Watson House
