= List of medical museums =

This is a list of medical museums.

== Armenia ==
- Armenian Medical Museum

== Austria ==
- Memorial Site Hartheim Castle, Alkoven
- Narrenturm (asylum)

== Australia ==
- Medical History Museum, University of Melbourne
- Royal Australasian College of Surgeons Melbourne

== Azerbaijan ==
- Azerbaijan Medicine Museum, Baku

== Belgium ==
- Museum of Medicine, Brussels

== Bulgaria ==
- Museum of Medicine History

== Canada ==
- Banting House, London, Ontario
- Canadian Medical Hall of Fame, London, Ontario
- Hillary House and Koffler Museum of Medicine, Aurora, Ontario
- Maude Abbott Medical Museum, Montreal, Quebec
- Museum of Health Care, Kingston, Ontario
- Museum of Vision Science, Waterloo, Ontario

== Cyprus ==
- Kyriazis Medical Museum

== Denmark ==
- Medical Museion, University of Copenhagen

== Ecuador ==
- Ecuador National Museum of Medicine

== Egypt ==
- Qasr Al-Eini Museum

== Finland ==
- Helsinki University Museum

== France ==
- Museum of the History of Medicine, Paris

== Germany ==
- Deutsches Medizinhistorisches Museum (German Medical History Museum), Ingolstädter Alte Anatomie (Old Anatomy Building), Ingolstadt, Bavaria
- Saxon Psychiatric Museum, Leipzig
- Berlin Medical History Museum

== Greece ==
- Hippocratic Museum

== Hungary ==
- Semmelweis Museum of Medical History (Semmelweis Orvostörténeti Múzeum) in the former home of Ignaz Semmelweis

== Iceland ==
- Icelandic Phallological Museum

== India ==
- Ibn Sina Academy of Medieval Medicine and Sciences
- Manipal Museum of Anatomy and Pathology (MAP)

== Iran ==
- Iranian National Museum of Medical Sciences History

== Italy ==
- Museo di storia della medicina, Rome
- MUSME, Padova
- Chieti Museum of Biomedical Sciences

== Japan ==
- Cannabis Museum (Japan)
- Daiichi Sankyo Kusuri Museum
- Medical Museum of Kawasaki Medical School
- Medical Science Museum, Tokyo
- Meguro Parasitological Museum
- Museum of Health and Medicine, Tokyo
- National Hansen's Disease Museum (Japan)
- Poison Gas Museum

== Latvia ==
- Pauls Stradins Museum of the History of Medicine, Riga

== Mexico ==
- Museum of Mexican Medicine, Mexico City
- Dr. Ángel Óscar Ulloa Gregori Museum Room, at the Autonomous University of Nuevo León, in Monterrey
- Palace of the Inquisition

== Norway ==
- Norwegian Museum of Science and Technology

== Portugal ==
- Museum of Hospital Rovisco Pais, Tocha - Cantanhede City
- Madeira Optics Museum

== Russia ==
- Medical History Museum, Tyumen
- Russian Museum of Military Medicine, Saint Petersburg

== South Korea ==
- The Museum of Medicine

== Spain ==
- Basque Museum of the History of Medicine and Science

== Sweden ==
- Medical History Museum, Sahlgrenska University Hospital, Gothenburg

== Switzerland ==
- Medizinhistorisches Museum, Zürich

== Syria ==
- Nur al-Din Bimaristan

== Thailand ==
- Siriraj Medical Museum

== Turkiye ==
- Istanbul Sağlık Müzesi

== United Kingdom ==
- George Marshall Medical Museum, Worcester
- Hunterian Museum, London
- Old Operating Theatre Museum and Herb Garret, London
- Surgeons' Hall Museum
- Tayside Medical History Museum, University of Dundee, Scotland
- Thackray Medical Museum, Leeds

== United States ==
- Dittrick Museum of Medical History, Cleveland
- Indiana Medical History Museum, Indianapolis
- International Museum of Surgical Science, Chicago
- Medical History Museum, Dr. Christopher S. Best House and Office, Middleburgh, New York
- Mütter Museum, Philadelphia
- National Museum of Health and Medicine, Silver Spring, Maryland
- Touma Museum of Medicine, Huntington, West Virginia

== Uzbekistan ==
- The Museum of Health Care of Uzbekistan

== See also ==
- History of medicine
- Hospital museum
