= UANL Faculty of Medicine =

Mexican research center

- Type: Public
- Established: 30 October 1859
- Director: Oscar Vidal Gutiérrez
- Location: Monterrey, Nuevo León, Mexico
- Website: www.medicina.uanl.mx
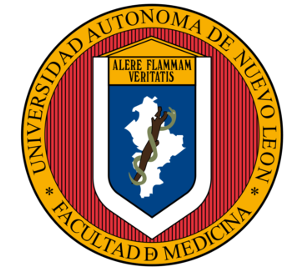

The UANL Faculty of Medicine is the medical school of the Autonomous University of Nuevo León, a public institution on the UANL Health Sciences Campus in Monterrey, Nuevo León, Mexico. Its history dates to 1828 when the Italian doctor Pascual Costanza started the first medical-surgical chair in the state. 1859, it was officially founded as a medical school by Doctor José Eleuterio González.

The clinical department of the School of Medicine is the Doctor "José Eleuterio González” University Hospital, a third-level care hospital with 868 beds. The school and the hospital, as a unit and in its different buildings, are made up of 62 medical departments and services and are one of the largest academic health institutions in Mexico.

The Faculty of Medicine and the University Hospital of the UANL have been pioneering models of teaching hospitals in Mexico since 1952. The faculty has 7,697 undergraduate students, 816 graduate students, and an academic staff of 406 full-time professors. Notably, 297 of these professors are part of the National System of Researchers (SNI), and 17 are members of the National Academy of Medicine. Its administrative scheme is also based on the hospital-school model where the director of the Faculty of Medicine is also director of the University Hospital.

== Education ==
The Faculty of Medicine of the UANL offers undergraduate degrees in Medical Surgeon-Obstetrician (MCP) and Clinical Chemist-Biologist (QCB). The MCP degree receives around 5,000 admissions applications annually, and 1 in 5 applicants is accepted. The faculty receives students from Nuevo León, the states of Coahuila, Tamaulipas, San Luis Potosí, Veracruz, and other states of Mexico, as well as from other countries such as the United States, Brazil, Venezuela, and Chile.

The bachelor's degree programs (MCP and QCB) are accredited by the Interinstitutional Committees for the Evaluation of Higher Education (CIEES), the Mexican Council for the Accreditation of Medical Education A.C. (COMAEM), and the National Council for the Evaluation of Chemical Sciences Programs (CONAECQ).

Internationally, the programs are accredited by the German Accreditation Agency for Engineering, Informatics, Natural Sciences and Mathematics (The Accreditation Agency for Study Programs in Engineering, Informatics, Natural Science and Mathematics (ASIIN). According to Newsweek magazine and the data firm Statista, in their annual list for the year 2023 of the best hospitals by country and in the case of Mexico, the Dr. José Eleuterio González University Hospital of the UANL is ranked number 12 in the country, and in place 2 in Nuevo León.

== History ==
In 1793, the UANL opened its doors in Monterrey, the Hospital of Our Lady of the Rosary. Later, in 1828, the Italian Doctor Pascual Costanza created the first medical-surgical chair.

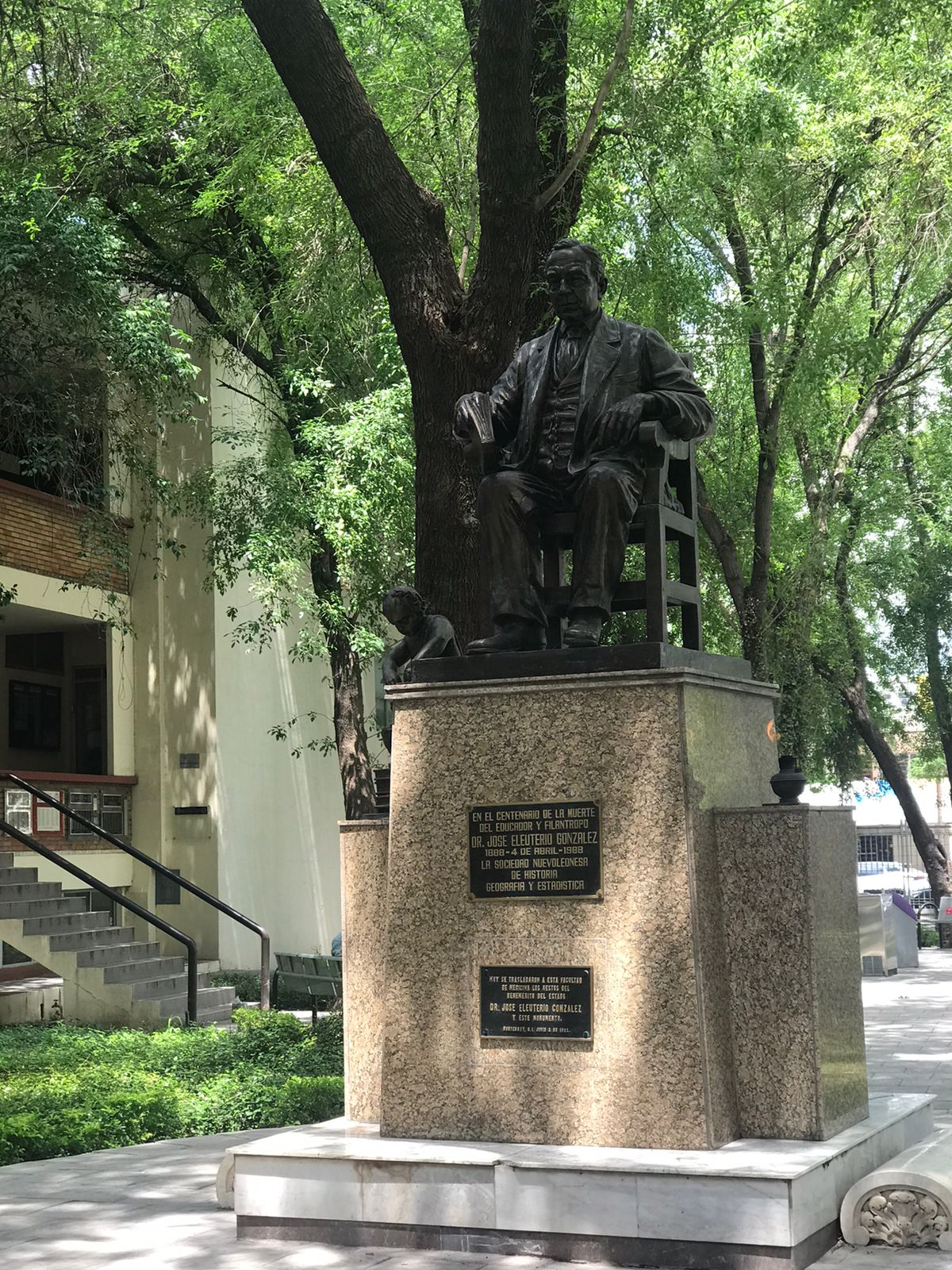
Statue of Doctor José Eleuterio González "Gonzalitos" UANL

In 1833, José Eleuterio González, from Guadalajara, arrived in the city, started working at the Hospital of Our Lady of the Rosary, and soon became interim director. In 1835, Dr Gonzalez started the Pharmacy Cathedra at the hospital's pharmacy. The School of Medicine was founded on October 30, 1859, with the inauguration of the Civil College under the direction of its founder, Dr. José Eleuterio González, known as "Gonzalitos." The Medical School started with 15 students and six professors.

On May 2, 1860, the first Civil Hospital in the State of Nuevo León was also inaugurated. It was neither military nor clerical and was a place where medical students could practice.

The emergence of this public school marks the beginning of academic medicine and the Faculty of Medicine. It also became a cornerstone of the operational history of the University of Nuevo León (UNL), now the Autonomous University of Nuevo León (UANL).

== Health Sciences Campus ==
The Faculty of Medicine and the University Hospital are the core of the Campus. This Health Sciences Campus of the UANL is the first and only University-academic Campus in the state of Nuevo Leon dedicated to Medicine and all the Sciences of Human Health care. The concept corresponds to the initial project of the year 1927 of the illustrious director Dr. Eusebio Guajardo to establish for the teaching and practice of Medicine an Institute of Medical Sciences in Monterrey. The Campus is in the city's West in the Las Mitras Centro neighborhood and borders to the south with Francisco Madero Avenue and to the West with Gonzalitos Avenue (6), two of the main avenues of Monterrey. In its extension of 291,885 m2 are, at its southern end facing Madero Avenue, the main buildings: the University Hospital "Dr. José E. González” (Opened in 1943), the Faculty of Medicine (inaugurated in 1952) and the HU Tower (in service since 2018) and the Library and Regional Health Documentation Center building (inaugurated in 1992). In addition to other buildings that make up the Faculty and the Hospital, the Health Sciences Campus is made up of the Faculties of Dentistry, Psychology, Public Health and Nutrition, and Nursing, in addition to the Medical Services of the UANL staff and the Center for Research and Development in Health Sciences of the University Hospital (CIDICS), in addition to sports facilities for students.

== Undergraduate Academic Programs ==
The MCP degree at the Faculty of Medicine has a semester plan of 12 semesters (6 years) and 339 credits. From the 7th semester, medical students serve clinical teaching-learning tasks as undergraduate interns and, upon completing the degree, a year of social service. The QCB program has a 10-semester (5-year) semester plan with 224 credits and six months of social services in the 9th semester for 16 credits. In the 10th semester, they do professional internships for 20 academic credits. CENEVAL considers the QCB program a national reference for its EGEL Plus in Chemistry results.

== Continuing Education ==
The sub-directorate of Continuing Education of the UANL Medical School Faculty of Medicine aims to promote research, professional development, and continuing education for the growth of professionals in the health area. It organizes and endorses academic events, workshops, diploma courses, and symposiums to keep professionals current. These cover many disciplines within Medicine, such as clinical chemistry, mental health, and health administration, and promote academic and ethical development and good medical practice.

In 2023, the continuing education offer was more than 155 events with the participation of 13,000 attendees and involving 2,400 professors.

== “Medicina Universitaria” Medical Journal ==
On behalf of the Medical School and the University Hospital, the Office for Continuing Education publishes its scientific journal, Medicina Universitaria (University Medicine), which reports original articles, review articles, and clinical cases to promote research, medical creativity, and scientific writing of the staff and students, and also accepts national and international manuscripts. Likewise, publications on history, philosophy, and medical ethics are published, including anecdotes or stories about doctors or patients that may be of general interest to readers. In January 1970, the first issue of Medicina Universitaria appeared, with Dr. Álvaro Gómez Leal as editor.

== Research ==
The faculty has 297 researchers with appointments from the National System of Researchers (SNI). The Research Vice-Directorate promotes, regulates, and monitors research. Operationally, the Vice-Directorate receives and manages research protocols to ensure their quality and collaborates with other national and international research institutions and the pharmaceutical industry to achieve clinical studies.

In 2024, 836 research studies will be carried out, of which 235 are linked to the pharmaceutical industry, 284 original research studies, 162 postgraduate research studies with a specialty, and 155 subspecialties, master's, and doctoral studies.

Every two years, the Faculty of Medicine and University Hospital "Dr. José Eleuterio González", through the Research Vice-directorate, organizes the National Congress of Research and Innovation in Medicine, which consists of keynote lectures, symposia, workshops, and courses.

== Dr. Ángel Óscar Ulloa Gregori Museum Room ==
The Dr. Ángel Óscar Ulloa Gregori Museum Room is a facility of the Faculty of Medicine and is located in the Library building. This room preserves the regional and Faculty medical history. It organizes outreach activities, along with teaching and research activities in medical history.
