= Museum of the History of Medicine, Paris =

Museum in Paris, France

Museum of the History of Medicine
- Musée d'histoire de la médecine
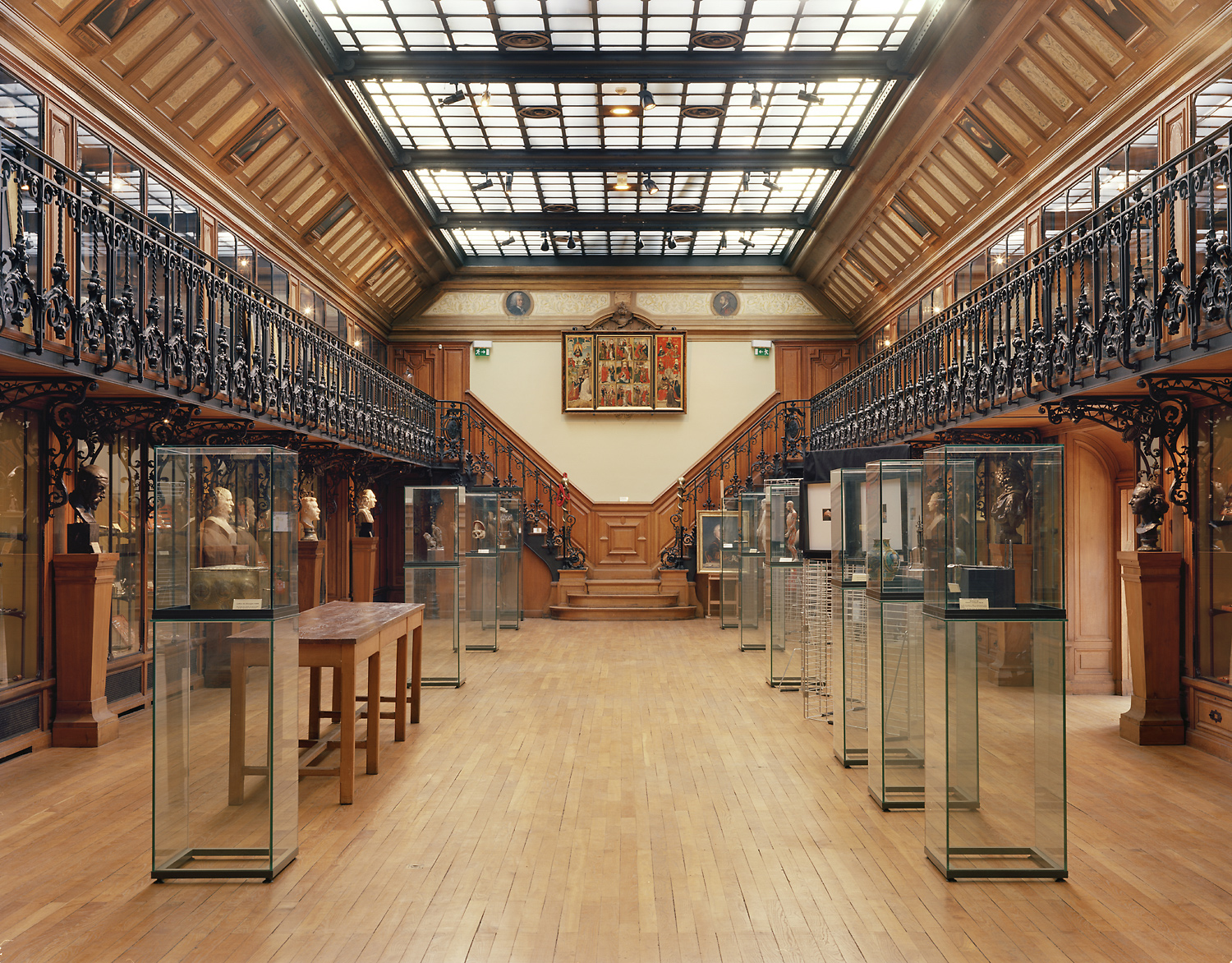
- The main exhibit room
- Location: 12 rue de l'École de Médecine; 75006 Paris, France
- Coordinates: 48°51′4″N 2°20′28″E
- Curator: Marie-Véronique Clin-Meyer
- Owner: Paris Cité University
- Website: u-paris.fr/musee-de-lhistoire-de-la-medecine

The Museum of the History of Medicine (French: Musée d'histoire de la médecine [myze distwaʁ də la medsin]) is a medical museum in the 6th arrondissement of Paris, France. It is located at 12 rue de l'École de Médecine, on the second floor of the historic École de Médecine building, nowadays part of Paris Cité University.

Since 1971, the headquarters of Paris Cité University (formerly Paris Descartes University) have been located in the former premises of the Medical School founded in 1803, and situated in the buildings of the Academy of Surgery.

The Museum of the History of Medicine is housed on the second floor of the building, in a room built in 1905.

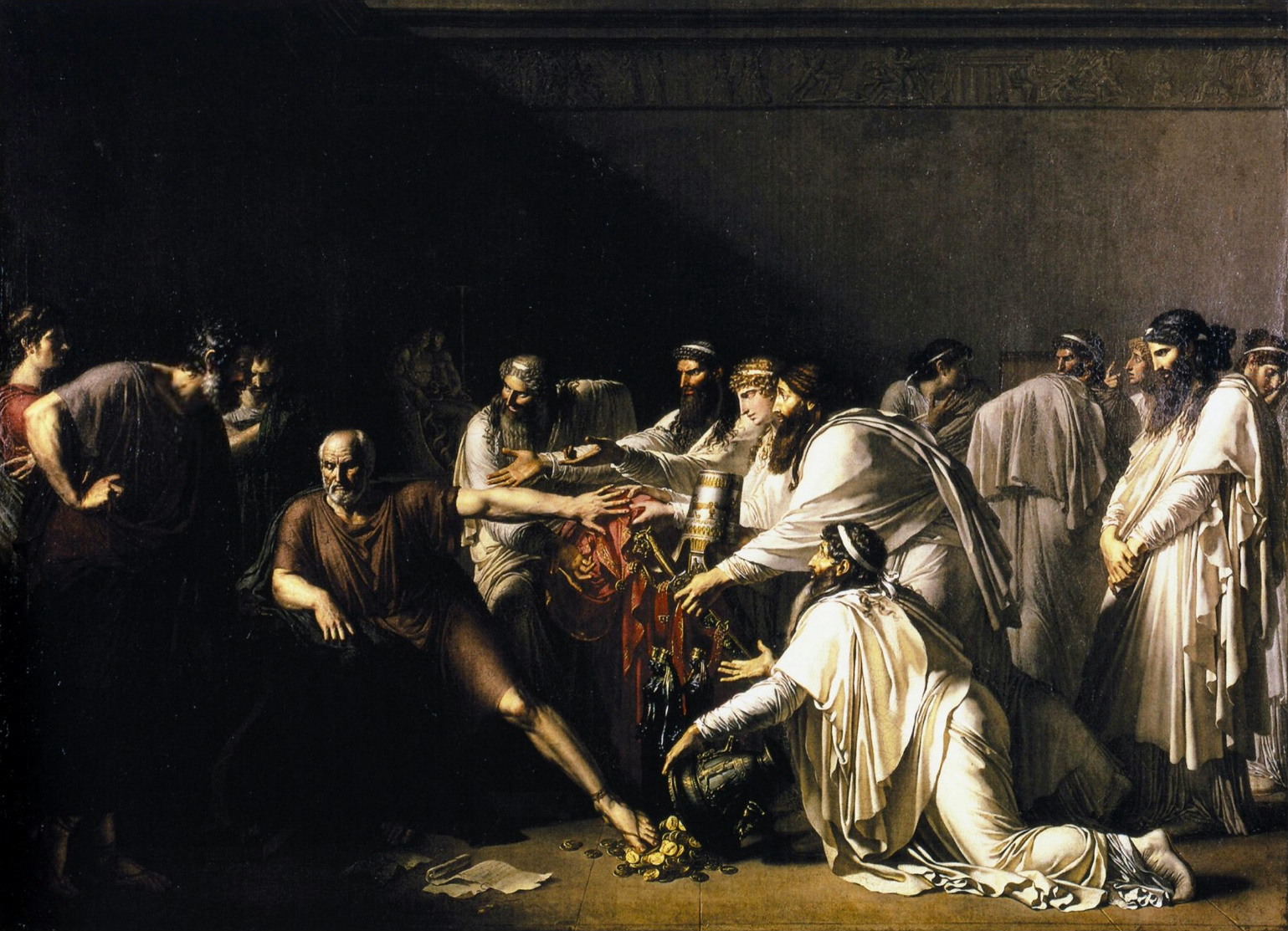
Hippocrates Refusing the Gifts of Artaxerxes by Girodet, 1792

Its collections, the oldest in Europe, were put together by the dean Lafaye in the 18th century, then a considerable collection of pieces covering the different branches of operating art until the end of the 19th century was added. One can also discover several rare medical and surgical bags as well as physiology tools.

== See also ==
- List of museums in Paris
- List of medical museums
