= Museum of Medicine =

Medical museum in Brussels, Belgium

- Musée de la Médecine (French); Museum van de Geneeskunde (Dutch)
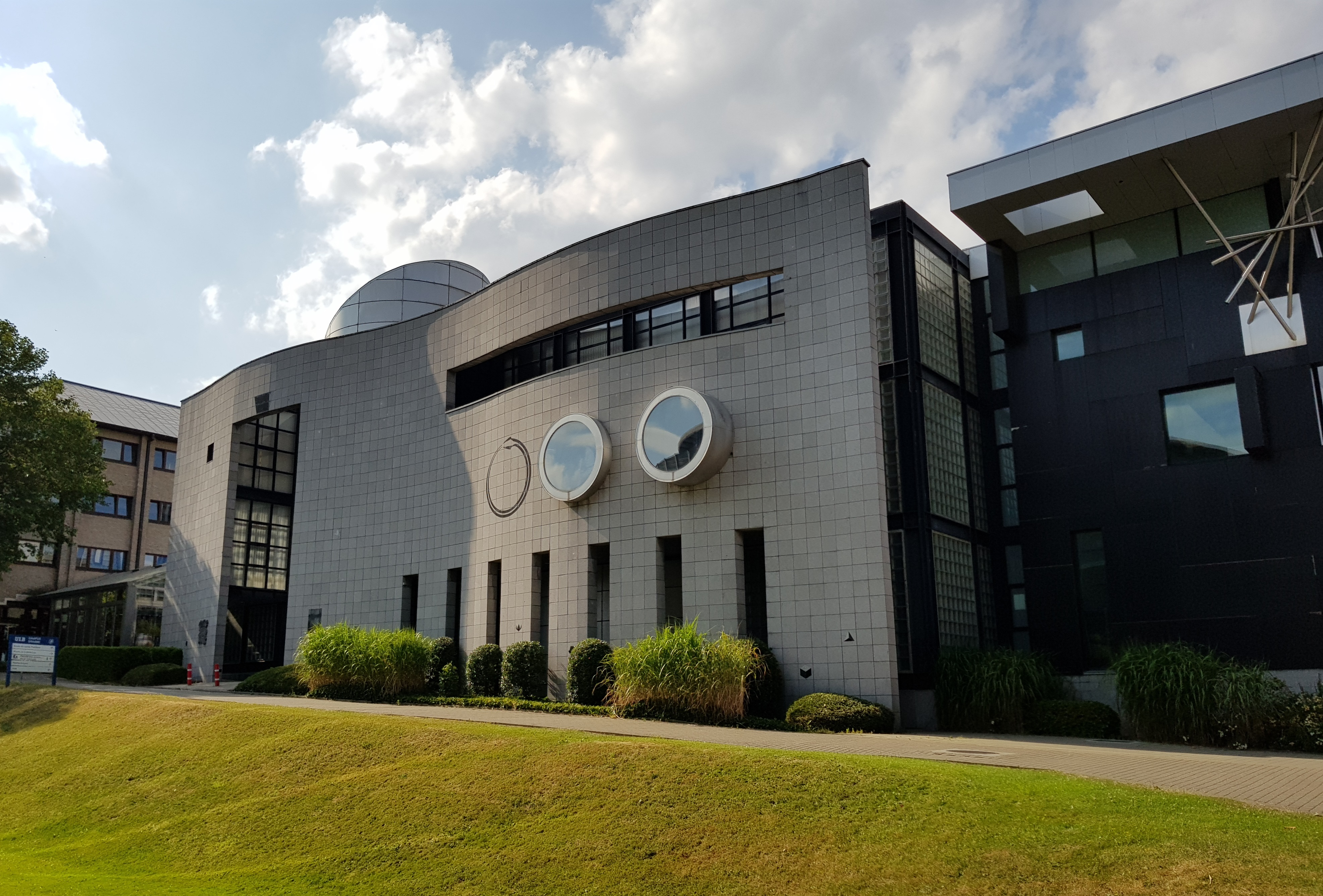
- Exterior of the museum
- Interactive fullscreen map
- Location: Route de Lennik / Lenniksebaan 808, 1070 Anderlecht, Brussels-Capital Region, Belgium
- Coordinates: 50°48′50″N 4°16′04″E
- Type: Medical museum
- Public transit access: 5 Erasme/Erasmus
- Website: www.erasmushouse.museum/en

The Museum of Medicine (French: Musée de la Médecine; Dutch: Museum van de Geneeskunde) is a medical museum in Anderlecht, a municipality of Brussels, Belgium.

The museum is located at 808, route de Lennik/Lenniksebaan, on the Erasme/Erasmus campus of the Université libre de Bruxelles (ULB), next to Erasmus Hospital.

== See also ==
- List of museums in Brussels
- List of medical museums
