= Touma Museum of Medicine =

- Established: 1991; 35 years ago
- Location: 314 Ninth Street, Huntington, West Virginia 25701
- Coordinates: 38°25′18.379″N 82°26′38.752″W
- Type: Medical museum
- Collection size: +2,800
- Curator: Edward Dzierzak
- Owner: Marshall University
- Website: Official Website

Touma Museum of Medicine is a medical museum located in downtown Huntington, West Virginia. Established in 1991, the museum was the private collection of Dr. Joseph B. Touma whose interest is the history of medicine as told by the invention and improvements in medical instruments. He and his wife, Omayma Touma, are physicians who served Huntington, West Virginia for many years. In 2017, they donated their +2,800 medical artifacts to Marshall University to preserve the collection

The collection may be viewed by appointment. Please call (304) 696-5787 and request a tour.

== Features ==
- Cardiology Gallery
- Catch-All Gallery
- Ear nose and throat gallery
- History of Dentistry Gallery
- Instructional Aid Gallery
  - 1920 General Practitioner's Office
- Lee's Pharmacy
  - Leech Jars
- Medical library
- Microscope Gallery
- Ophthalmology Gallery
- Surgical Gallery
- Tools of the Trade Gallery
  - Restored Doctor's Coupe
  - Restored 1910 Studebaker

== See also ==
- List of medical museums
- List of museums in Huntington, West Virginia
