= Oscar Vidal Gutiérrez =

Mexican medical doctor and researcher

- Born: 26 August 1960; Ciudad de México
- Education: Autonomous University of Nuevo León
- Website: www.droscarvidal.com

Oscar Vidal Gutiérrez (born 26 August 1960) is a Mexican medical doctor and researcher. He was born in Mexico City and completed his medical studies at the UANL Faculty of Medicine and "Dr. José Eleuterio González” University Hospital from the Autonomous University of Nuevo León.

Vidal-Gutierrez is a specialist in gynecology and obstetrics and holds a Doctorate in Medicine from the UANL. He is also a postgraduate in Gynecological Oncology at the National Cancer Institute (INCAN). He also has a degree in law and a master's degree in Alternative Conflict Resolution Methods from the Faculty of Law and Criminology of the UANL.

His area of oncological surgery and specialty is in pelvic, ovarian, endometrial, vulvar, and breast tumors. He is a member of the National System of Researchers (SNI), Level I, of CONAHCYT.

He currently serves as the director of the UANL Faculty of Medicine.

== Selected publications ==
- Clinical trial of radical hysterectomy by laparotomy vs. vaginally assisted laparoscopy in stage 1 cervical cancer. Doctorate thesis, Autonomous University of Nuevo León. 2001.
- Epidemiological algorithm for early detection of COVID-19 cases in Mexican Oncologic Center. Healthcare. 2022.
- Risk association of TOX3 gene polymorphisms with sporadic breast cancer in Mexican women. Current Oncology. 2022.
- Complete metabolic response after carboplatin desensitization in peritoneal carcinomatosis. Journal of Oncology Pharmacy Practice. 2022.
- Evaluation of ovarian reserve in women with Rheumatoid arthritis. Journal of family & Reproductive health. 2021.
- Nutritional screening in oncologic patients taking chemotherapy in a reference cancer center. Clinical Nutrition Espen. 2023.
