= Jesús Ancer Rodríguez =

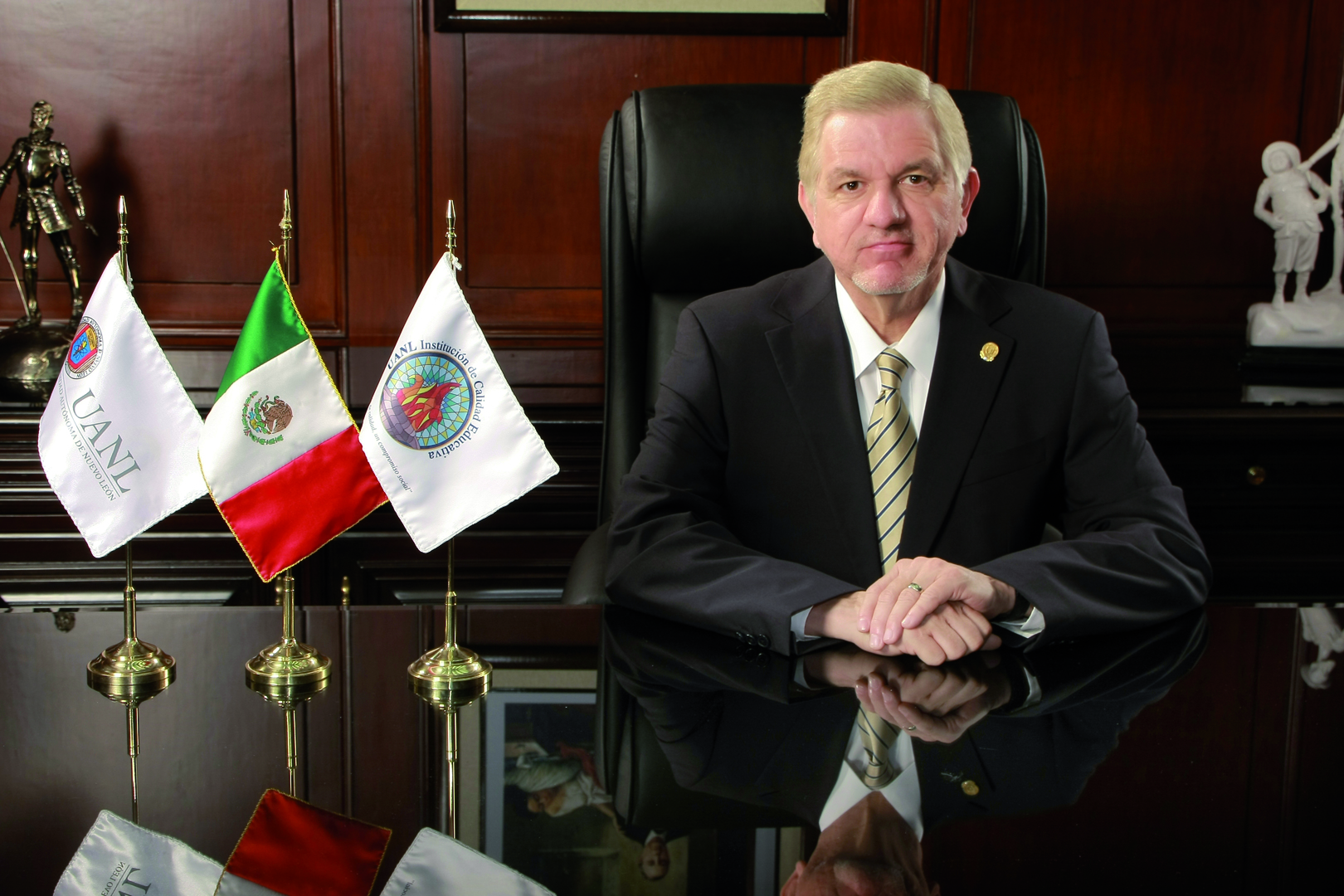

President of the Autonomous University of Nuevo León
- Preceded by: Jose Antonio Gonzalez Trevino

Personal details
- Born: January 21, 1952 (age 74) Monterrey, Nuevo Leon, Mexico
- Education: Autonomous University of Nuevo León (UANL)

Jesús Ancer Rodríguez (January 21, 1952) is a Mexican researcher, physician and Doctor of Philosophy. He is president of the Autonomous University of Nuevo Leon (UANL). He was born in Monterrey, Nuevo Leon on January 21 of 1952 and made his professional studies at the Faculty of Medicine of the UANL, for which he is Surgeon and Obstetrician. He specializes in Pathology in the University Hospital "Dr. José Eleuterio González" and the General Hospital of the Ministry of Health and Welfare in Mexico City, focusing on areas of Neuropathology, Dermatopathology and Immunofluorescence. He has two doctorates: one in pathology, from the Autonomous University of Madrid and one in medicine from the UANL.

He has been Professor, Deputy Director and Director of the Faculty of Medicine of the UANL from 2003 to 2009 and General Secretary of the university. During his tenure, among other things, he promoted and created the Center for Research and Development in Health Sciences (CIDICS), with recognition as a center of excellence in health and biomedicine. From 2008 to 2010 he was regional vice president of the Consortium for North American Higher Education Collaboration (CONAHEC) and since 2009 is President (Rector) of the UANL.

He has received numerous awards as the one conferred by the Harvard University in 2001 for making the institution a symbol of culture and humanism in our country; another one granted in 2001 from the Educational Support Club to Children in Hospital; he appeared in The Contemporary Who's Who in 2002 and the award in 2005 by the Michou and Mau, IAP Foundation, for his humanitarian work on behalf of children with severe burns.

He has conducted research in Pathological Entities frequency, Special Techniques in Cytopathology, Immunohistochemistry Diagnostic and Prognostic and Epidemiology of Infections and Disorders Associated Chlamydia. From his research it has been derived more than 53 scientific articles published in national and international refereed journals and worldwide presentations of more than 150 conference papers and academic events.
