= Complex of Sultan Bayezid II Health Museum =

- Sultan II. Bayezid Külliyesi Sağlık Müzesi
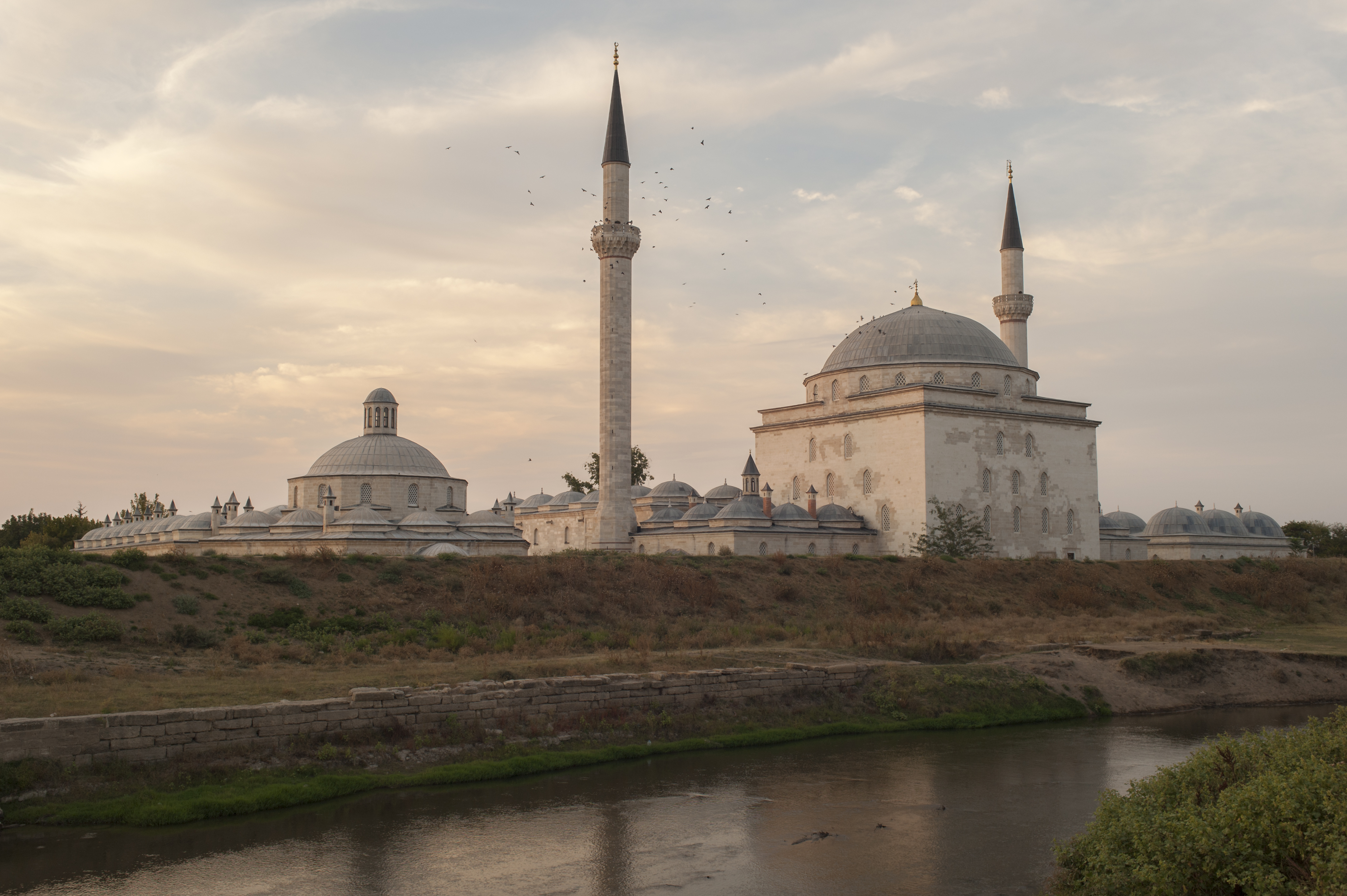
- Established: 1997
- Location: Complex of Sultan Bayezid II, Edirne, Turkey
- Type: Hospital museum
- Founder: Trakya University
- Website: www.trakya.edu.tr/kulliye_ing/

The Complex of Sultan Bayezid II Health Museum (Turkish: Sultan II. Bayezid Külliyesi Sağlık Müzesi) is a hospital museum of Trakya University within the Complex of Sultan Bayezid II located in Edirne, Turkey.

The historic darüşşifa of the complex was incorporated into the structure of Edirne-based Trakya University in 1993, and converted into a hospital museum in 1997, a museum dedicated to the history of medicine and health matters in general. It has been developing constantly ever since. It remains Turkey's only museum in its field and provides varied and valuable information to visitors on the development of medicine and of medical services throughout history, especially Ottoman history. The museum is the second most visited historical site in Edirne after the Selimiye Mosque. The museum was awarded the European Council's "European Council Museum Award" in 2004.

== Gallery ==
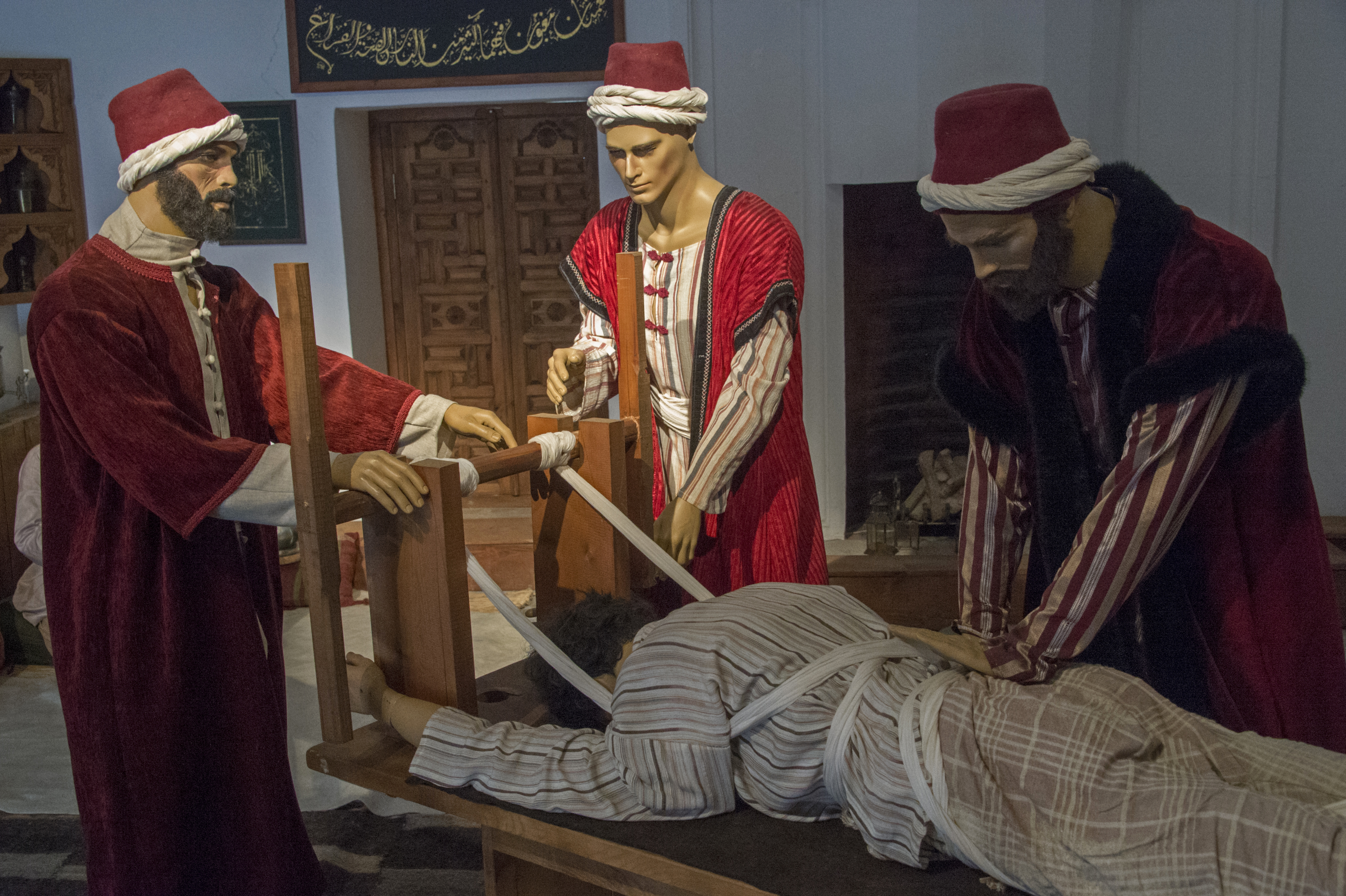
Traction on vertreba

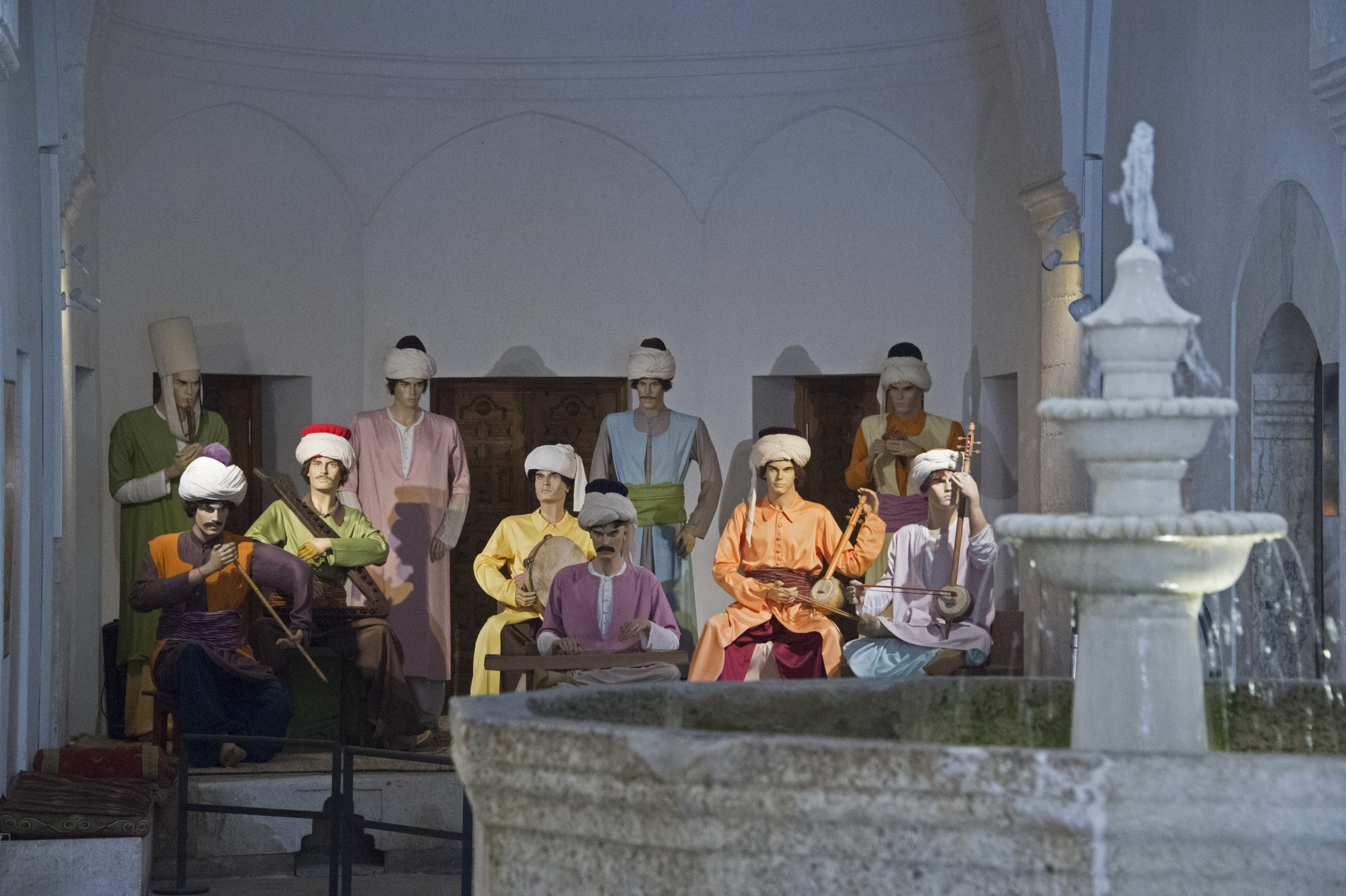
Orchestra played music to put the patients minds at rest

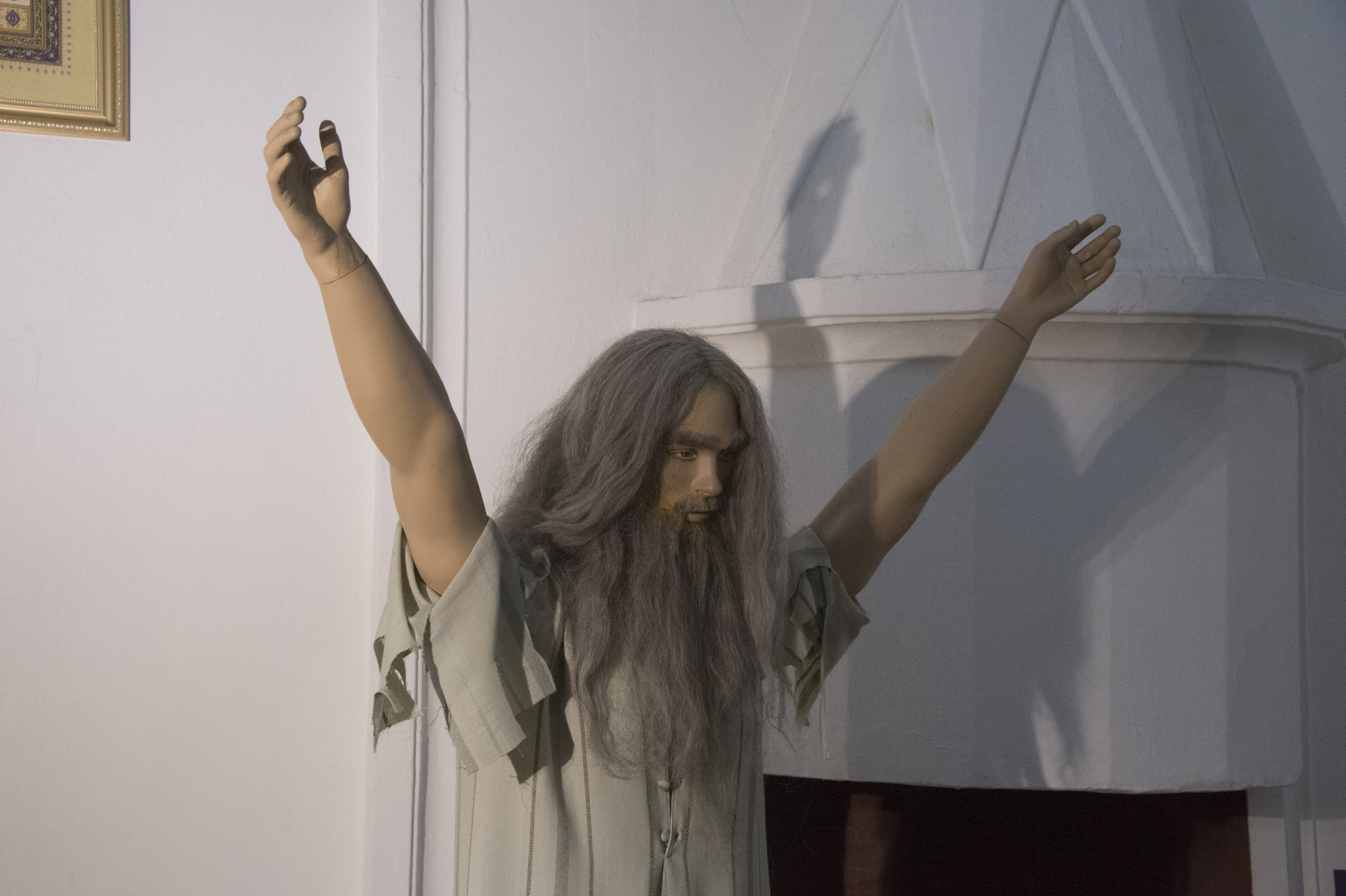
Madman

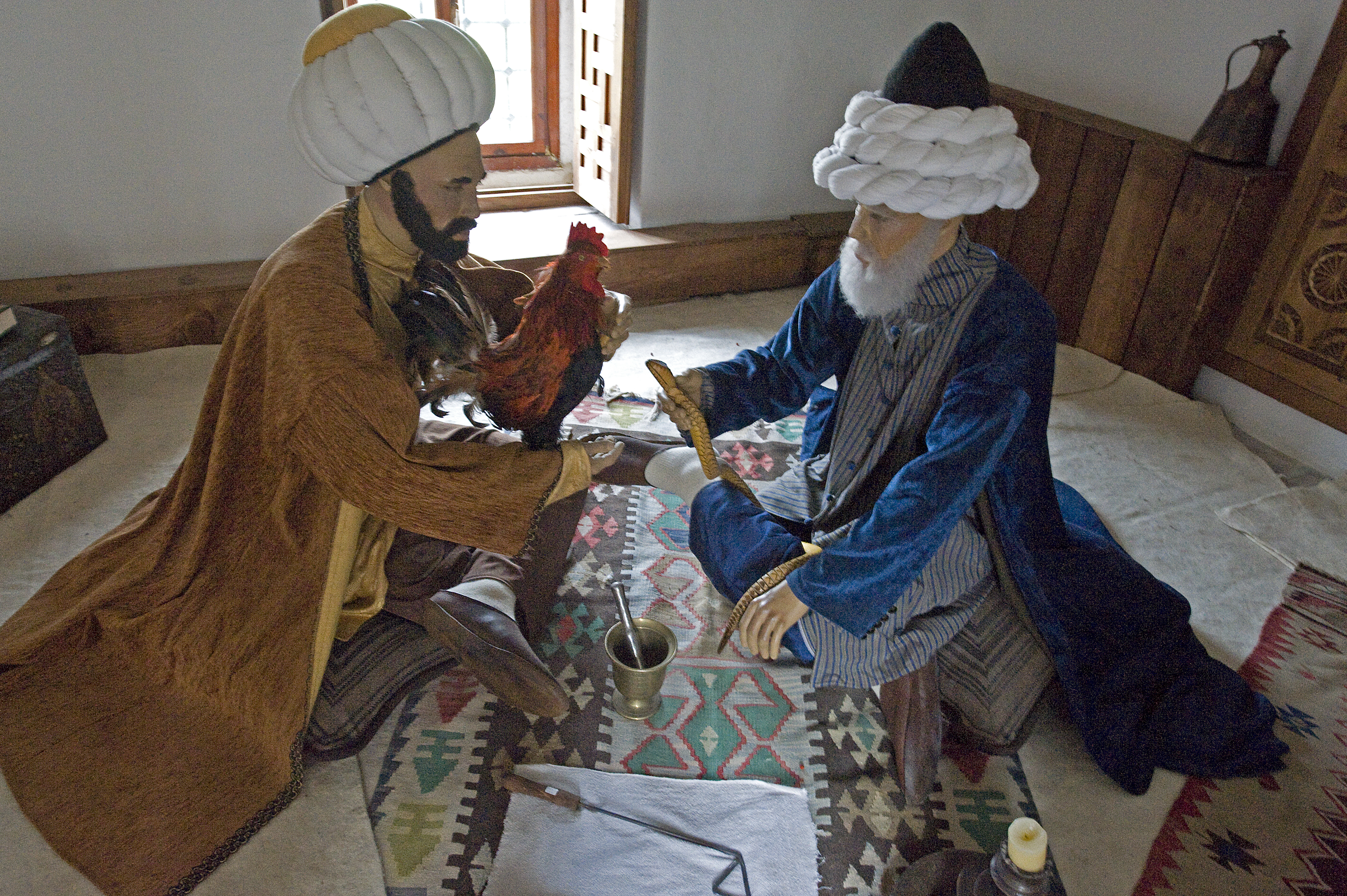
Serum testing

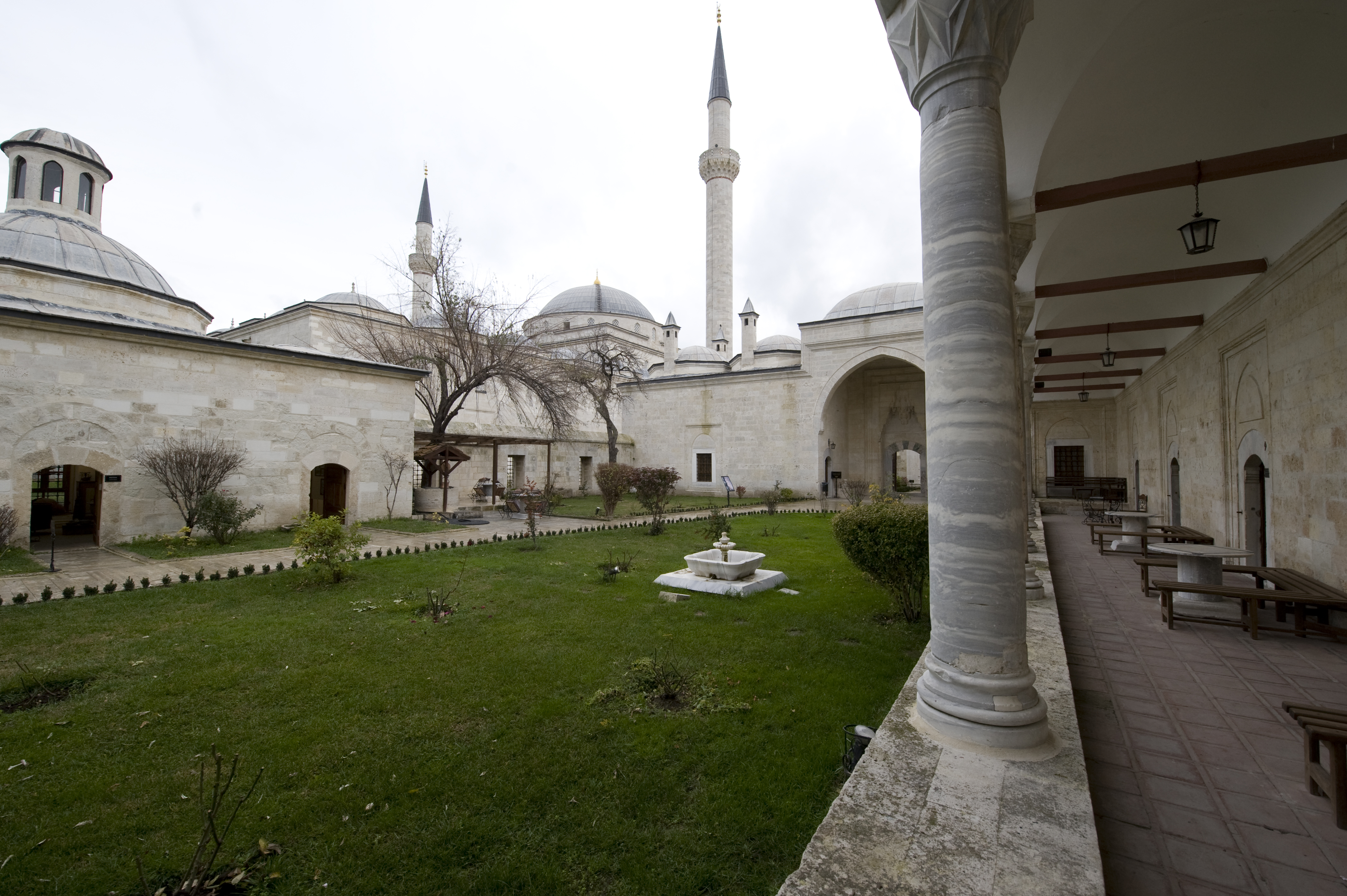
A courtyard in the museum area
