= Hippocrates Refusing the Gifts of Artaxerxes =

Painting by Anne-Louis Girodet de Roussy-Trioson

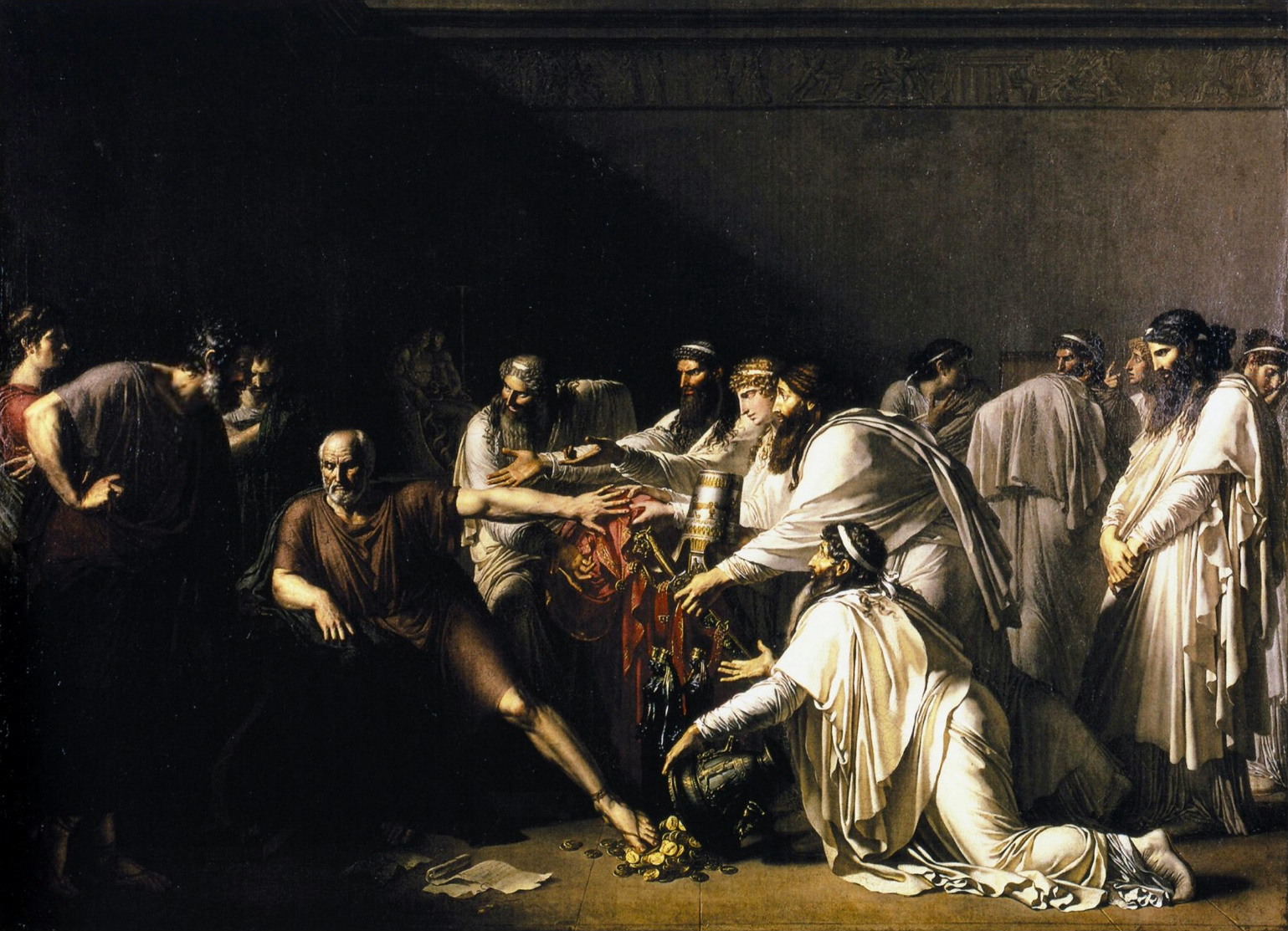
- Artist: Anne-Louis Girodet de Roussy-Trioson
- Year: 1792
- Type: Oil on canvas, history painting
- Dimensions: 99 cm × 135 cm (39 in × 53 in)
- Location: Museum of the History of Medicine; Paris

Hippocrates Refusing the Gifts of Artaxerxes (French: Hippocrate refusant les présents d'Artaxerxès) is a 1792 history painting by the French artist Anne-Louis Girodet de Roussy-Trioson. It depicts a scene on the island of Kos in Ancient Greece. The Persian Emperor Artaxerxes I, at war with the Greeks, demanded that the celebrated physician Hippocrates, heal his armies who were suffering from the plague. In a gesture of patriotism he refuses all the rewards offered to him, saying that he will accept nothing to aid the enemy while his own people are on danger.

Girodet was a noted pupil of Jacques-Louis David and the painting reflects the Neoclassical style championed by David. It was produced during the context of the French Revolution, when such celebrations of patriotic virtue were at their height. The painting was exhibited at the Salon of 1814 at the Louvre in Paris. Hastily arranged following the downfall of Napoleon, a number of artists showed earlier paintings they had produced. Today it is in the collection of the Museum of the History of Medicine in Paris.

== Bibliography ==
- Cantor, David. Reinventing Hippocrates. Taylor & Francis, 2017.
- Crow, Thomas. Emulation; Making Artists for Revolutionary France. Yale University Press, 1995.
- King, Helen. Hippocrates Now; The ‘Father of Medicine’ in the Internet Age. Bloomsbury Publishing, 2019.
