= Dr. Ángel Óscar Ulloa Gregori Museum Room =

Museum Room Dr. Ángel Óscar Ulloa Gregori
- Sala Museo Dr. Ángel Óscar Ulloa Gregori
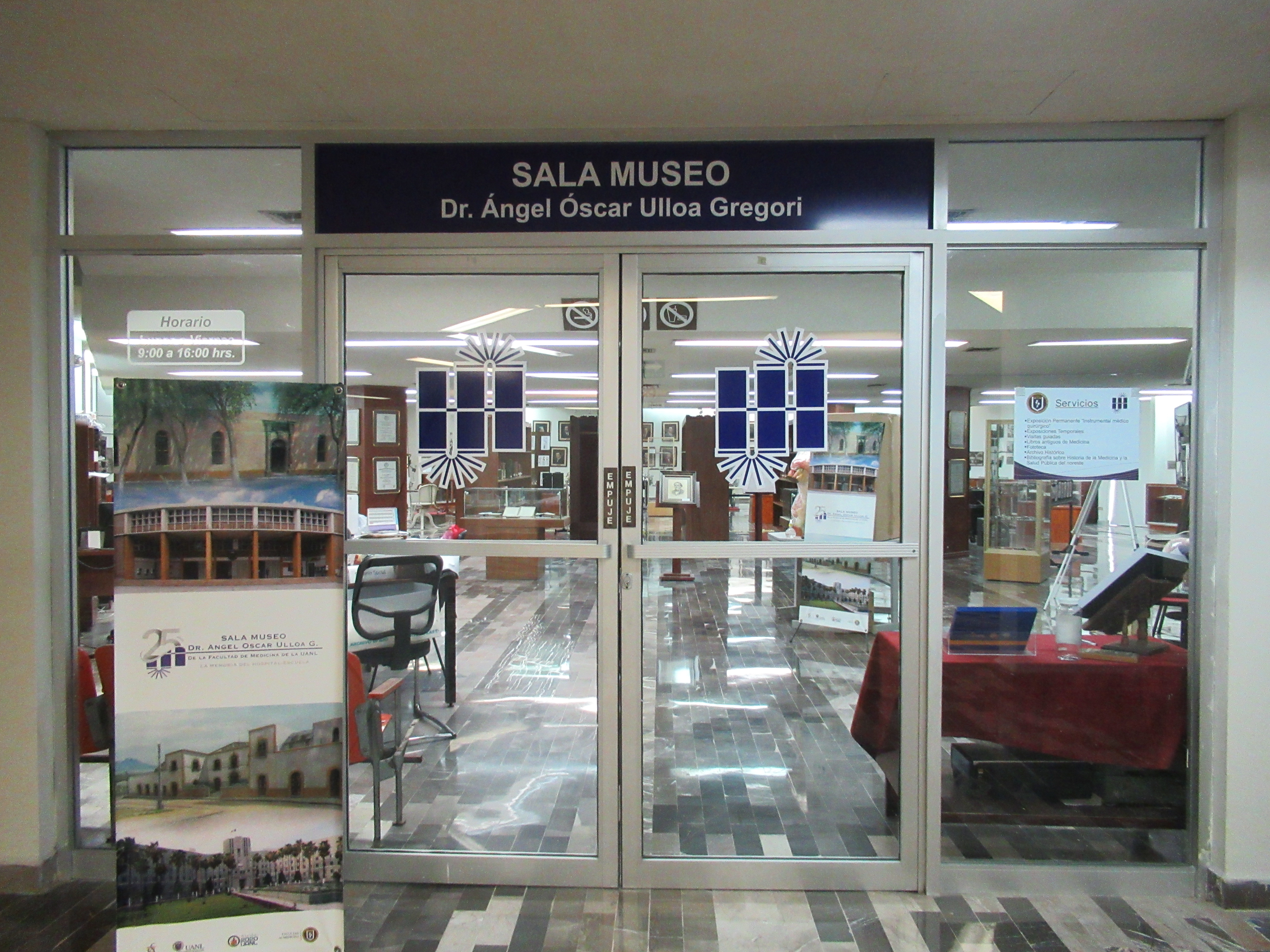
- Entrance to The Museum Hall Dr. Ángel Óscar Ulloa Gregori
- Former name: Historical Room
- Established: 1993
- Location: Faculty of Medicine of the Autonomous University of Nuevo León (UANL) in Monterrey, Mexico
- Type: Medical museum
- Website: http://www.medicina.uanl.mx/salamuseo/

The Dr. Ángel Oscar Ulloa Gregori Museum Room is an installation of the Faculty of Medicine of the Autonomous University of Nuevo León (UANL) in Monterrey, Mexico that is named in honor of the plastic surgeon who donated his collection to the museum. It includes medical tools from the 18th through the 20th centuries. It is located inside the Regional Center for Health Information and Documentation (CRIDS) in the university's medical building.

== History ==
The museum was inaugurated on October 18, 1993, under the name of Historical Room. Initially it was part of what is now the Archive Historical Documentary and Photographic of the Faculty of Medicine, which consisted of a section of books, photographs and old medical instruments.

In 2002, Dr. Ángel Óscar Ulloa Gregori (1919–2015), plastic surgeon, graduate and professor with a more than sixty-year connection to the university, donated his personal collection of a thousand pieces of old medical-surgical instruments. From that date on, the Historical Room was renamed as "Dr. Ángel Óscar Ulloa Gregori", in his honor.

== See also ==
- List of medical museums
