= Hospital museum =

Type of museum

A hospital museum is generally a former hospital turned into a museum, often a medical museum.

== List ==
- Bakırköy Psychiatric Hospital Museum
- Complex of Sultan Bayezid II Health Museum
- Old DeLand Memorial Hospital
- Diamantina Health Care Museum
- Foundling Museum
- Franja Partisan Hospital
- Glenside Museum
- Hohlgangsanlage 8
- Hospital in the Rock
- Long Island Psychiatric Museum
- Museum of Medical Humanities
- Museum of the Castle and Military Hospital at Ujazdów
- Porirua Lunatic Asylum
- Spanish Military Hospital Museum
- Springsure Hospital Museum
- St Bartholomew's Hospital
- St George's Church, Bergen
- Tung Wah Group of Hospitals Museum
