= Azerbaijan Medicine Museum =

Medical museum in Baku, Azerbaijan

- Azerbaijan Medicine Museum
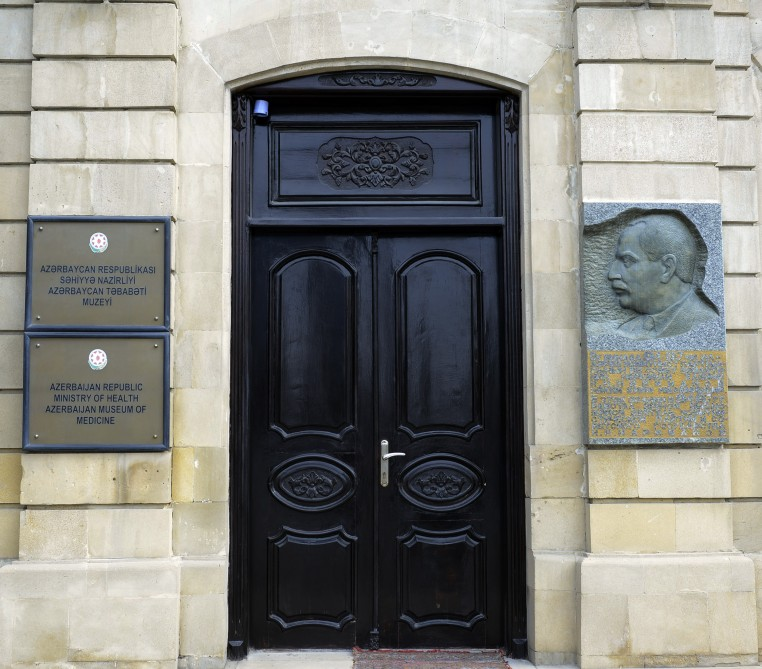
- Established: 1986
- Location: Baku, Azerbaijan
- Coordinates: 40.383438°N 49.876953°E

The Azerbaijan Medicine Museum is a museum in Baku, Azerbaijan that covers the history of medicine.

== History ==
The museum was created by the decree of the Ministry of Health of the Republic of Azerbaijan (Minister Talat Gasimov) dated July 2, 1984. It has officially been operating since January 29, 1986.

== Exhibition ==
The exhibits begin with the bas-relief, which is a description of Asclepius (a hero and god of medicine in ancient Greek religion and mythology). At the entrance, Asclepius and his daughters, Hygieia and Panacea have huge bas-reliefs.

In the first hall, a bust of Abu Ali ibn Sina, one of the greatest scholars of the 12th century in the East and the photo of the manuscript of the Law of the Science of Doctor work written in 1143, which is being taught in many European medical universities are illustrated. This hall also features a bust of Hippocrates, who is the founder of modern medicine, and a piece of his famous oath. Different elements of ancient Greek and Roman, medieval Azerbaijan, Eastern, Western European medicine have been embedded in copper boards along the walls.

The second hall features medieval surgical instruments, copies of separate medical records of 13th to 19th centuries, which the original ones are kept in the Manuscripts Institute. Portraits, diplomas, monographs, and dissertations of the first Azerbaijani doctors studied in the European and Russian universities in the 19th century, Abdulkhalik Akhundov, the organizer of the first free medical treatment in Baku Mammadrza Vakilov, the first sanitary doctor Mustafa Sharifov, Bahram Akhundov, Karimbey Mehmandarov, Ibrahim Rahimov, are displayed in this hall. There is also a corner dedicated to the scientist, professor of Kazan (Volga region) Federal University Mirza Kazim Bey, who enriched nerve and cardiology fields with scientific experiments.

The third hall covers the beginning of the 20th century in Baku. According to the decision of the oil industrialists, many photographs and documents relating to the creation of medical facilities equipped with modern medical equipment were demonstrated.

In the fourth hall, Comprehensive information has been provided about the medicine during the period of the first democratic republic of the East-Azerbaijan Democratic Republic, the first building of Baku State University, founded in 1919, its first rectors, Vasili Razumovsky and neuropathologist Sergey Davidenko, the first graduation of the medical faculty, professors and teachers. Here, in the early years of Soviet power in Azerbaijan, the activities of the Revolution Committee in health care are widely discussed, medical magazines published in Baku, works of scientists and other materials are exhibited.

One of the corners of the hall has been dedicated to Nariman Narimanov. His medical articles, his personal belongings, and the letter written by him to his son Najaf, are displayed here.

In the fifth hall, prior to the war, a great attention was paid to the organization of healthcare in the Soviet Azerbaijan, the establishment of the Azerbaijan Medical University and the Doctors Improvement Institute.

The Azerbaijan Red Crescent Society has its first recognition marks and clothes.

The last hall of the museum is about the work done in the field of health under the leadership of the President of the Republic of Azerbaijan Ilham Aliyev.

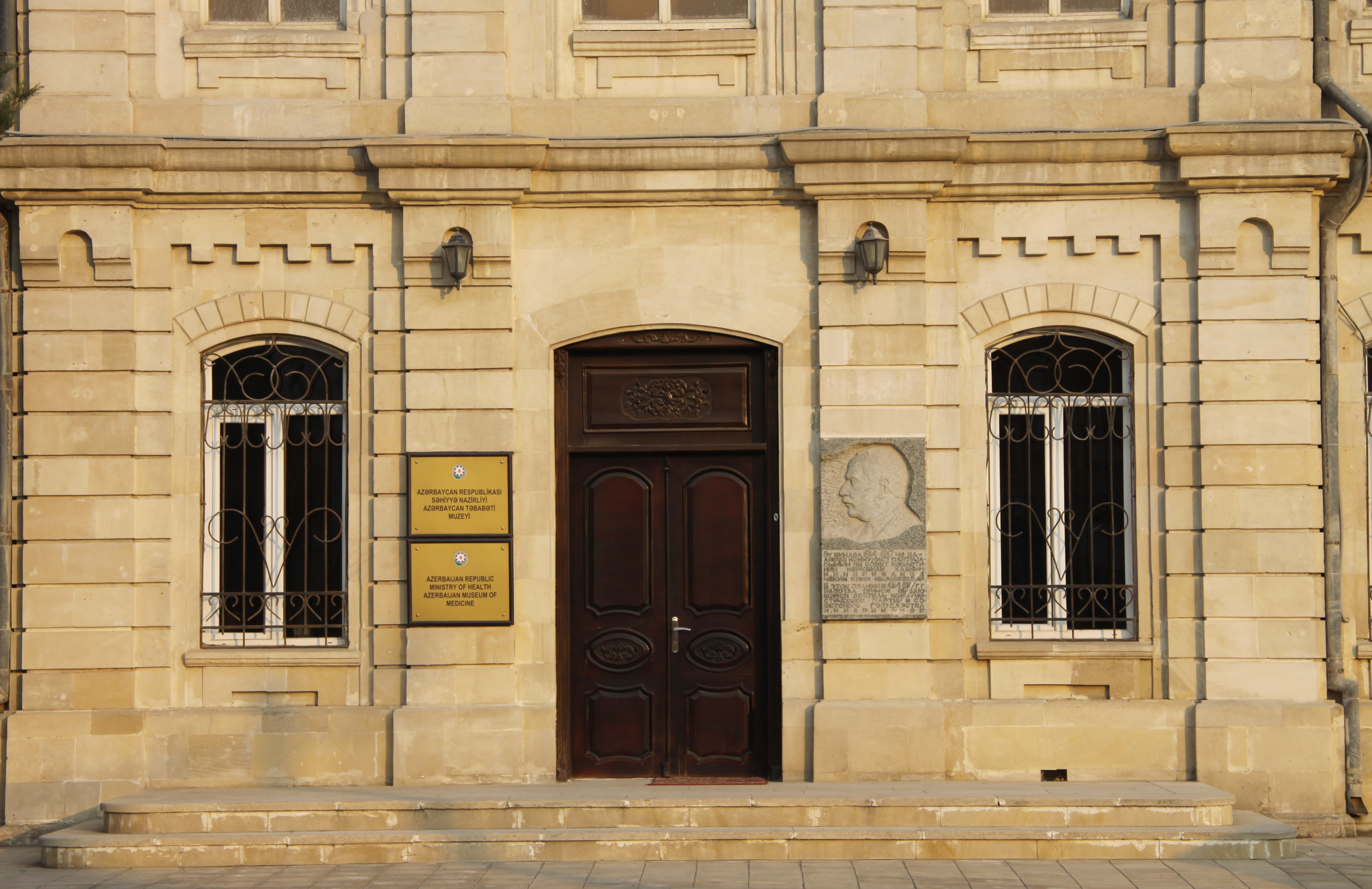

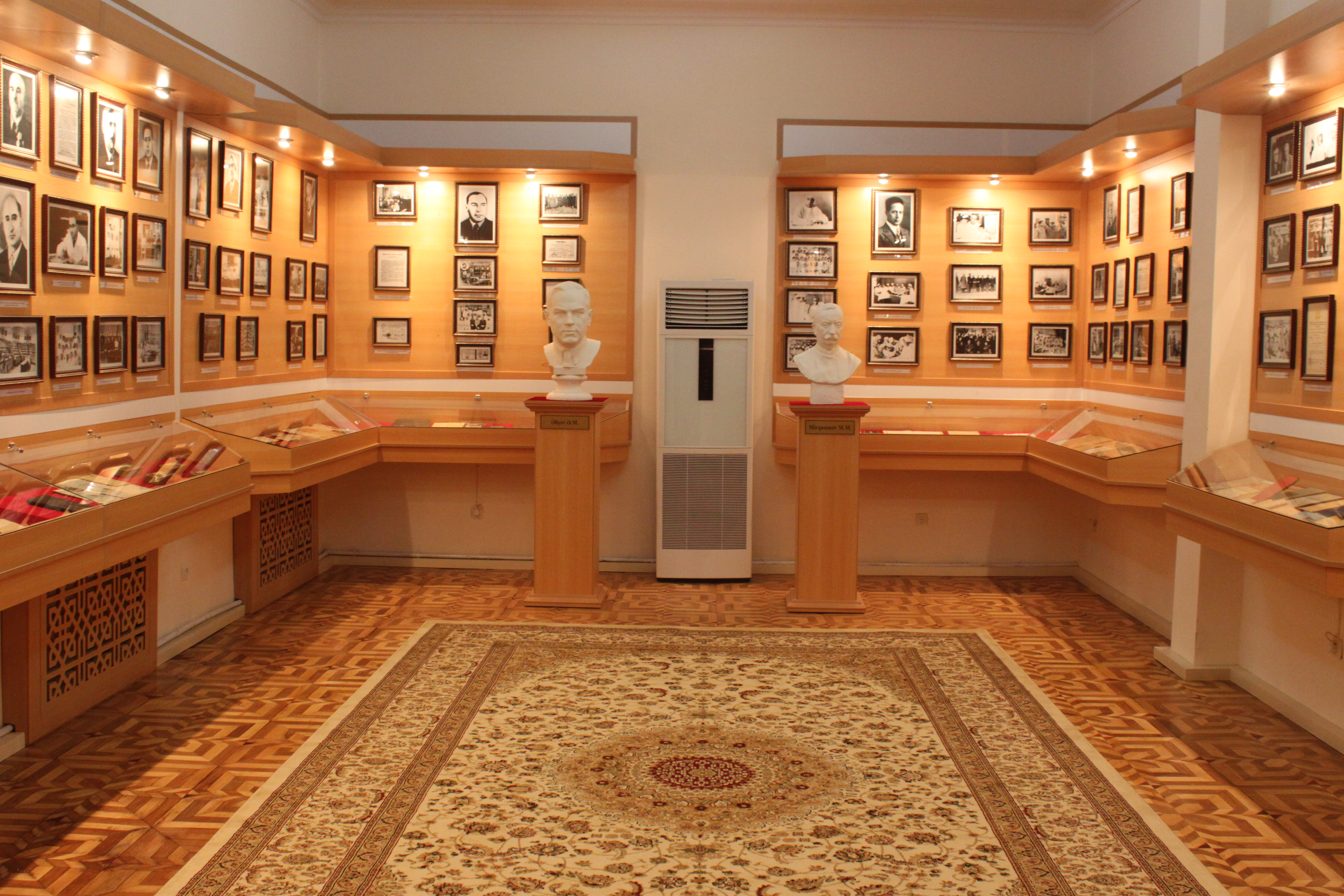

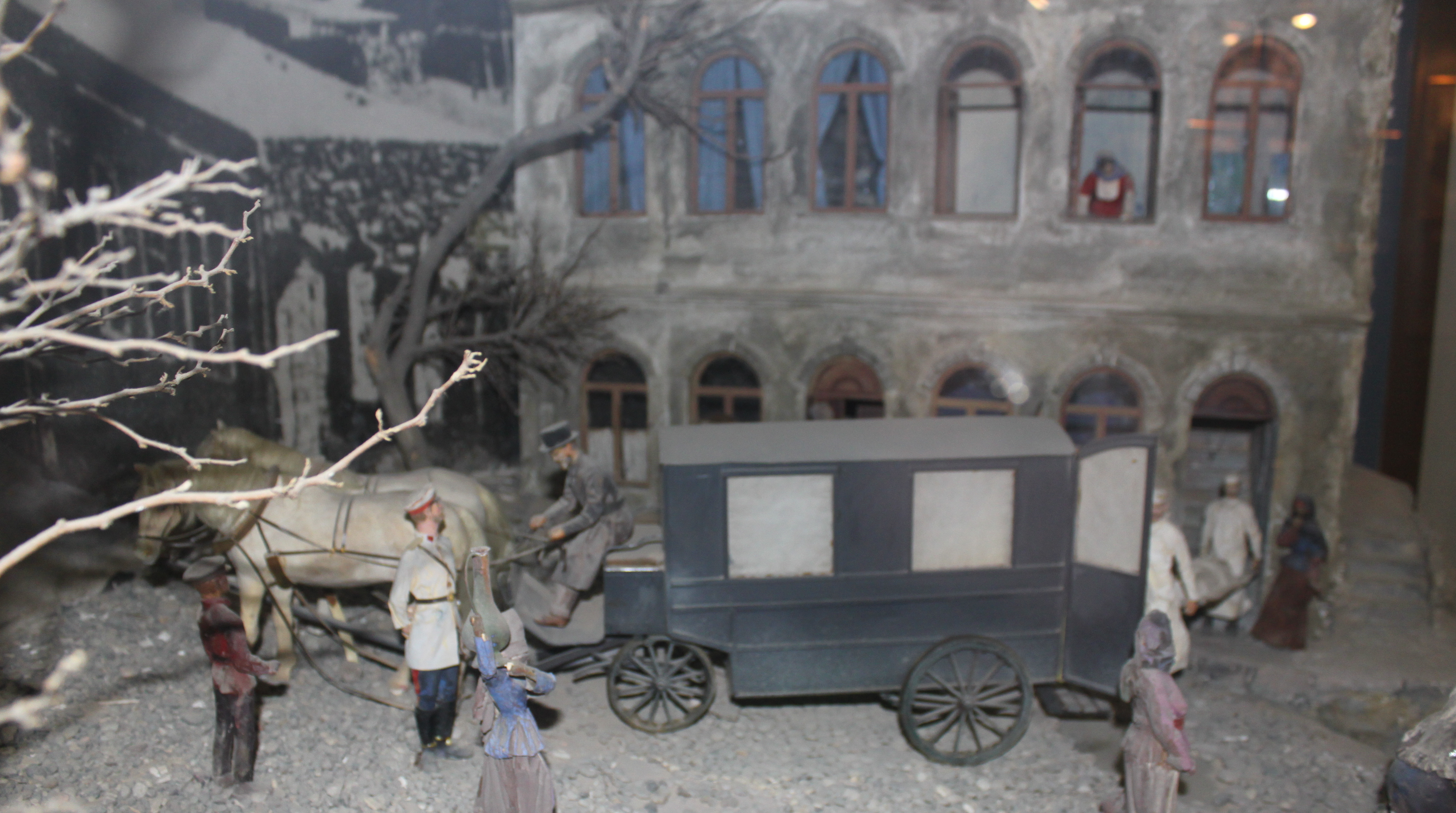

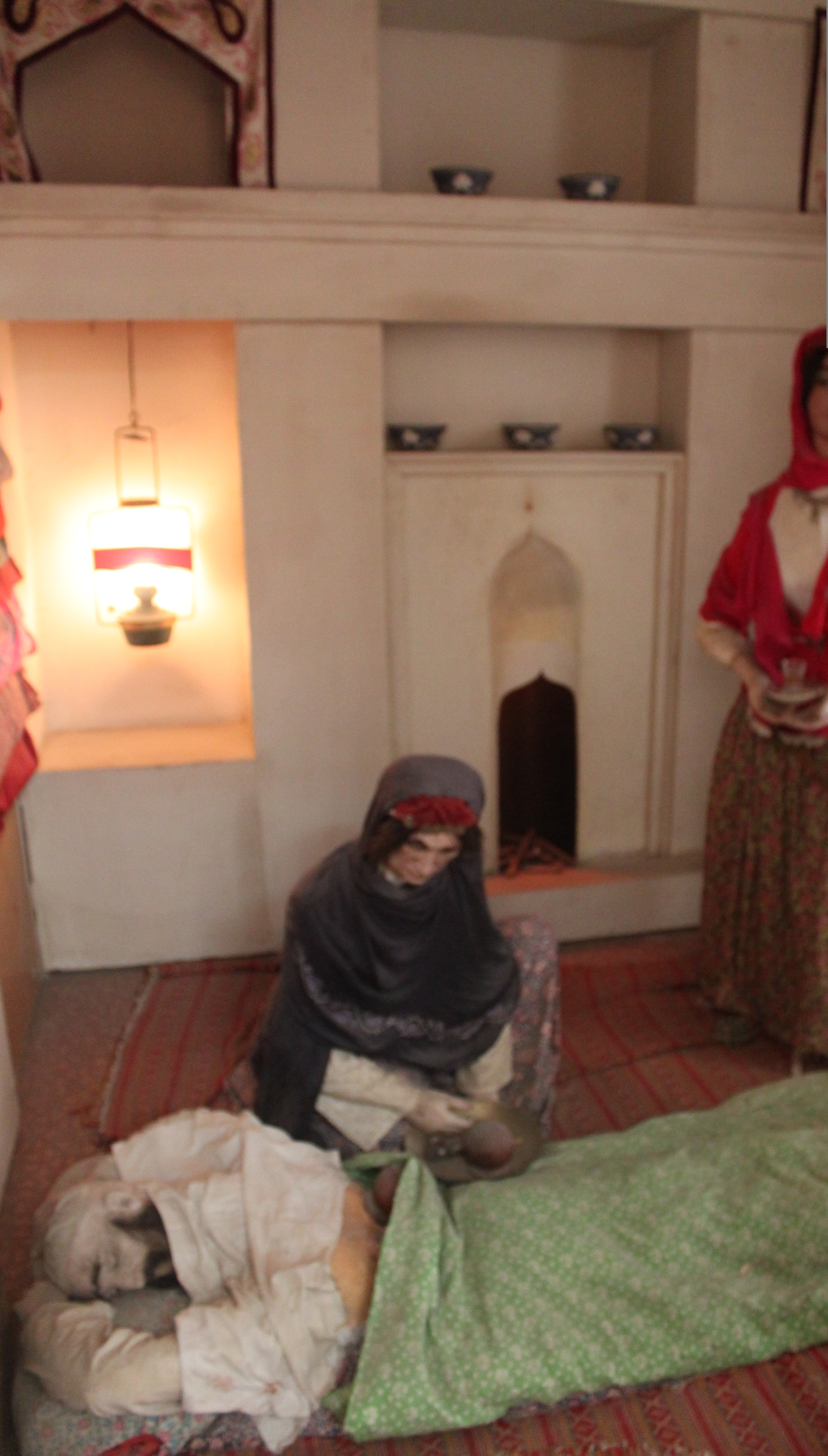

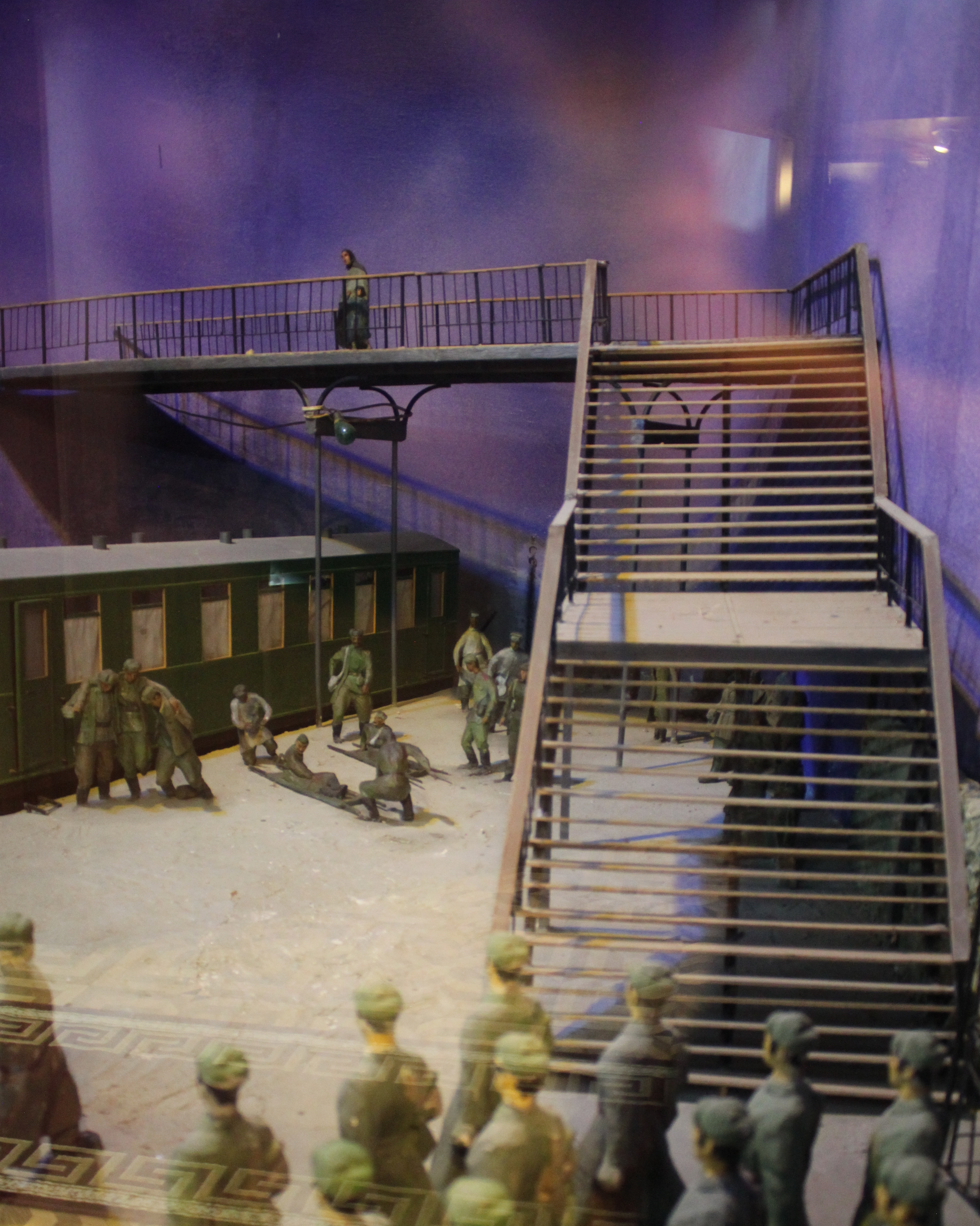
