= Center for Research and Development in Health Sciences =

Mexican research center

- Centro de Investigación y Desarrollo en Ciencias de la Salud
- Other names: CIDICS
- Type: Public
- Established: 29 September 2009
- Rector: Rogelio Garza Rivera
- Director: Jesús Ancer Rodríguez
- Location: Monterrey, Nuevo León, Mexico
- Colours: Yellow & blue
- Website: www.cidics.uanl.mx
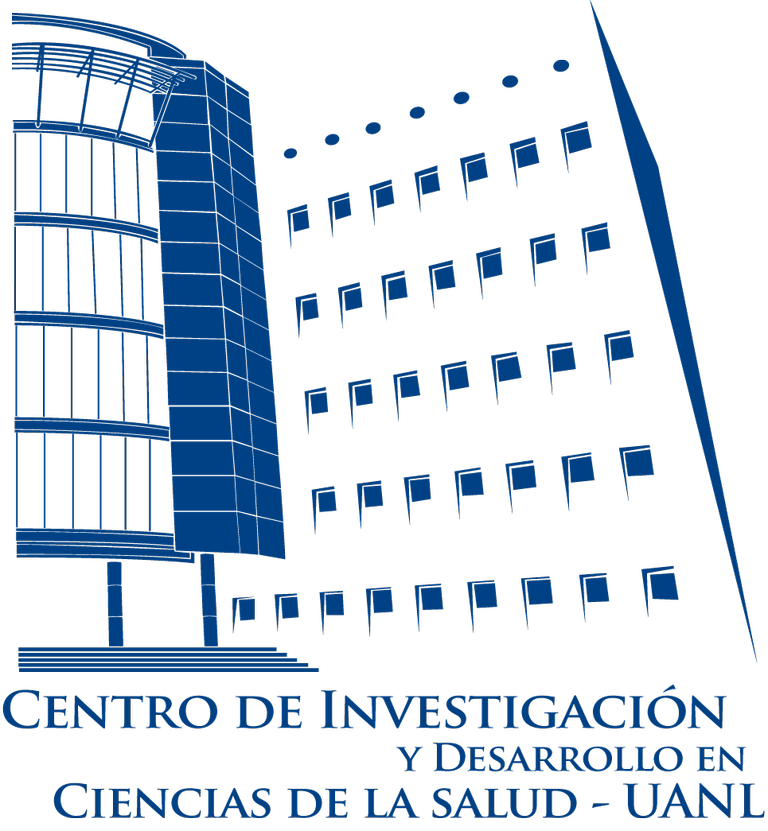

The Center for Research and Development in Health Sciences (CIDICS) of the Universidad Autónoma de Nuevo León (UANL, Autonomous University of Nuevo León), is an institution that provides Mexican society with academic and research infrastructure in the areas of health, biomedicine and biotechnology.

It is based on a six-story building with 15,500 m^{2} (167,000 sq ft), within the Health Sciences campus of the UANL, in the corner of José Eleuterio González and Dr. Carlos Canseco avenues, Mitras Centro, in the city of Monterrey, Nuevo León, Mexico.

== History and concept ==
Its construction was started on a proposal of the then Secretary General of UANL and current ex President Dr. Jesús Ancer Rodríguez and a group of distinguished co-workers and alumni in December 2006. It was dedicated on September 29, 2009, by the then Governor of the State of Nuevo León, Lic. José Natividad González Parás and the Rector of UANL, Ing. José Antonio González Treviño (2003–2009).

The CIDICS (formerly also CIDCS), was conceived as a multidisciplinary center and carries out its research work with the concept of bringing together and promoting research strengths of the many Faculties of the UANL in Health Sciences and related areas.

The research staff of CIDICS is integrated by professors of UANL, who also work at the Faculties of Medicine and University Hospital, Dentistry, Biology, Veterinary Medicine, Chemistry, Public Health and Nutrition, Psychology, Nursing, Sports Organization, as well as the neighbor institutions, the University Health Center and the University Outpatient Services.

== Organization ==
The CIDICS works with a simple and effective administrative organizational structure allowing an easier coordination of resources, with emphasis on people and social goals of the institution, beyond the means of labor or tools. Its director is Carlos E. Medina De la Garza.

== Mission ==
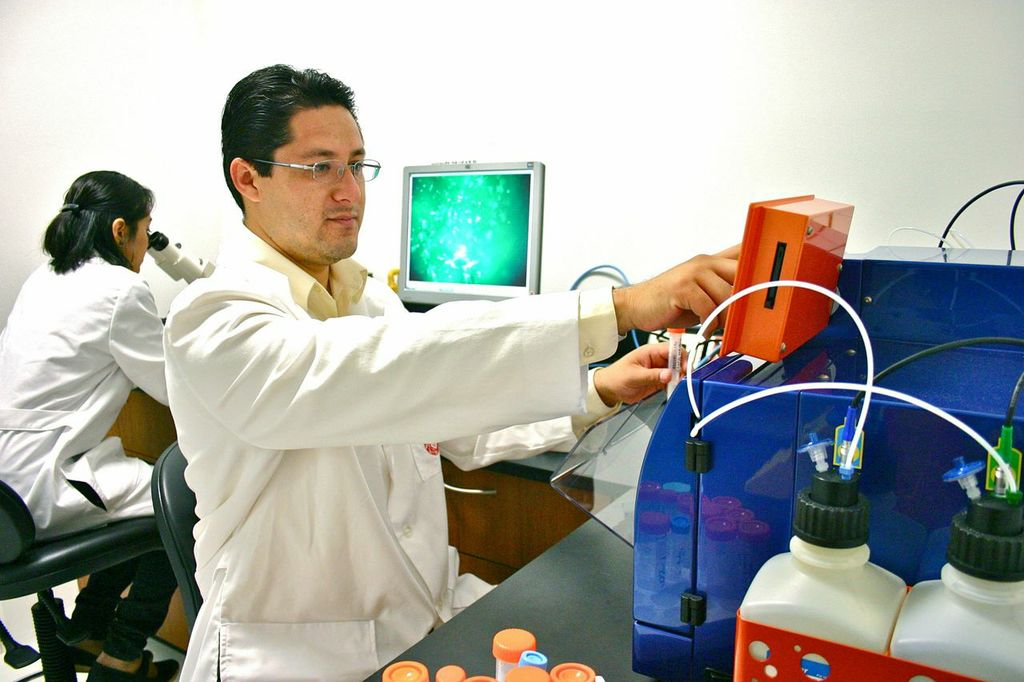
Laboratory of Gene and Cell Therapy

Conduct scientific and technological research to generate knowledge applied to solving priority health problems with a local, national and international scope. Integrate basic, clinical and public health research, to provide for scientific, innovative and competitive development in the northeastern region of Mexico. To link the development of biotechnological businesses that will contribute to the consolidation of an economy based on knowledge.

== Context ==
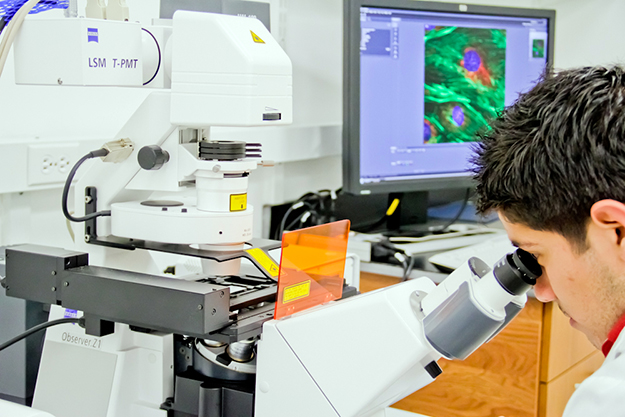
Bio-imagen

The CIDICS is at the forefront in developing and putting into action the instruments, technologies and tools necessary to understand, define and address key questions in clinical, medical practice and health. The center has a wide range of actions, from public health, where data is collected and analyzed for the creation of relevant public policies, to high-tech laboratories where genomics and proteomics converge and allow access to personalized medicine. Here, multidisciplinary teams conduct research and postgraduate teaching in collaboration with other educational and research centers, both the UANL, and other universities and the productive sector, domestic and foreign.

== Structure ==
The office of the Director has immediate contact with the Administrative Coordinator, in charge of Ing. Felipe E. Garza García, and the Academic Coordinator, in charge of Dr. Dora Elia Hernández Cortés. The unit for Knowledge Management, Biosafety, Public Relations, and Computing Information Systems, belong to the general direction. The center has Bioethics, Biosafety and Research Committees.

The center has the following working groups and laboratories, also known as “units”:

- Bioethics
- Bio-Image
- Biological Models
- Biosafety
- CIMAT (an independent unit of Biostatistics and Mathematics, from CONACyT)
- Pharmacological and Clinical Research
- Comprehensive Dentistry Research and Specialties
- Emerging Pathogens and Vectors
- Gene and Cell Therapy (Experimental Therapy)
- Health Psychology
- HIV-STD Prevention (Nursing)
- Immunomodulators
- Influenza and Respiratory Pathogens
- Knowledge Management
- Molecular Biology, Genomics and Sequencing
- Neuroscience
- Public Health Research
- Vaccinology
- Tissue Engineering

== Infrastructure ==
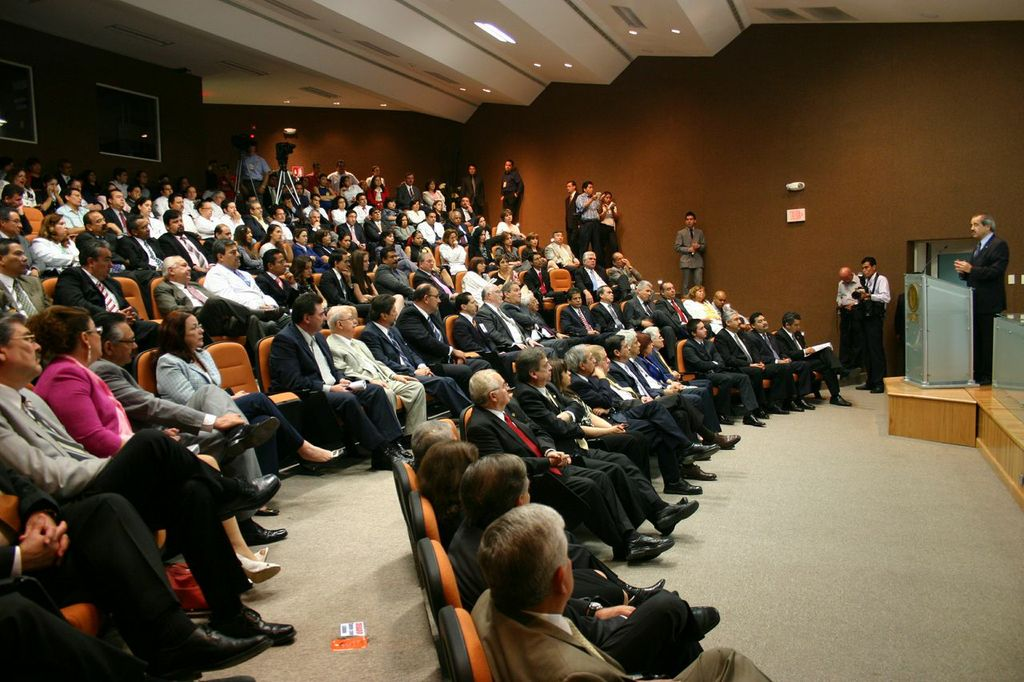
Auditorium

The CIDICS has a laboratory infrastructure consisting of:

- A team of pyrosequencing and different platforms to comparative genomic hybridization studies, as well as microarrays.
- Proteomics platform for the study of proteins.
- Equipment for stem cell culture and gene therapy.
- A full team for epidemiological studies and public health.
- Molecular diagnosis of infectious agents related to oral, respiratory and sexually transmitted diseases, among others.
- A team working for bioethical issues
- A high-tech space designed for appropriate use of biological models.
- Laboratories for research related to sleep problems, psycho-oncology, stress and addictions.

The CIDICS Auditorium has a capacity of 200 attendees, and meeting rooms to support academic and science events (conferences, symposia, workshops, etc.).
