= Museum of Medicine History =

Museum of the History of Medicine

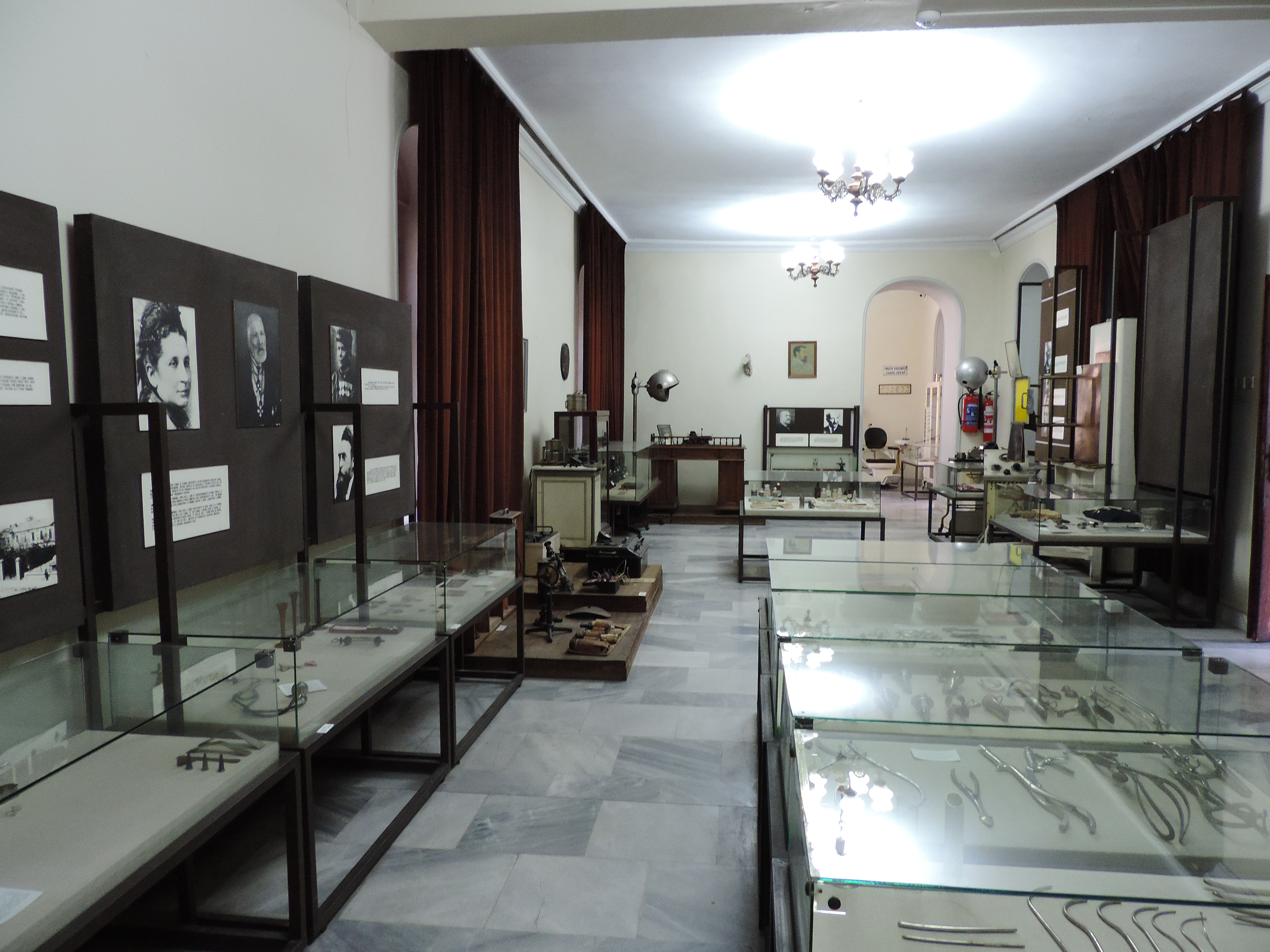
- Established: 1985
- Location: Varna, Bulgaria
- Coordinates: 43.199728°N 27.920691°E
- Type: Medical Museum
- Website: medmuseum.bg

The Museum of the History of Medicine (Bulgarian: Музей по история на медицината) is a museum located in Varna, Bulgaria. The museum is dedicated to the study of the development of Balkan medicine.

== History ==
The construction of the building began in 1868 financed by Paraskeva Nikolaou, the building was completed and inaugurated in 1869. The building was designed by architect Yanko Konstantinov. The building served as a hospital for a time. The building is considered to be the first charity hospital in Bulgaria. Between 1918 and 1966, the building had various purposes but all were related to health in Varna. In 1969, following the anniversary of the building's foundation, the idea of converting it into a museum was proposed. In 1985, the museum was inaugurated.

== Collections ==
The museum contains exhibits of different medical materials from ancient times to the present day, as well as documents about important medical figures in Bulgaria. The museum also has a library specialized in medical subjects. The museum contains 4000 medical books as well as paleoanthropological collections. Among the museum's collections are those of pharmacy, radiology, dentistry and surgery. The museum is divided into three exhibition halls.

- First exhibition hall: This hall contains the paleoanthropological collections spanning the fifth millennium BC and the end of the fourteenth century.
- Second exhibition hall: This hall displays the tools and medical equipment used between the Ottoman period and the Renaissance.
- Third exhibition hall: This room covers medical instruments and documents from the Russo-Turkish war to the 20th century.
