= Spanish Military Hospital Museum =

- U.S. Historic district – Contributing property
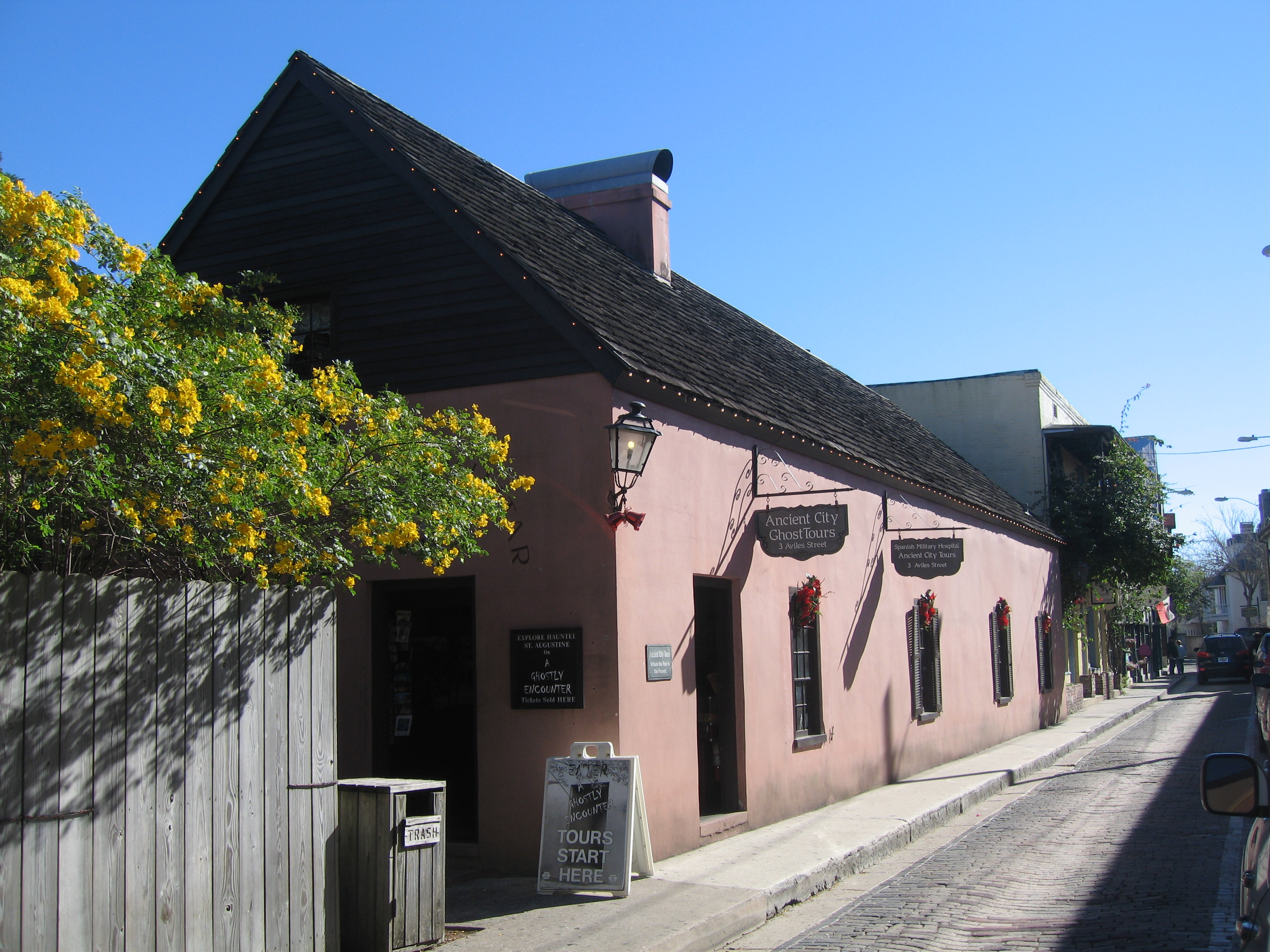
- Spanish Military Hospital

- Location within Florida
- Location: 3 Aviles St; St. Augustine, Florida
- Coordinates: 29°54′54″N 81°18′44″W
- Built: 1965
- Architectural style: Spanish Colonial
- Website: The Spanish Military Hospital Museum
- Part of: St. Augustine Town Plan Historic District (ID70000847)

The Spanish Military Hospital Museum is located at 3 Aviles Street, St. Augustine, Florida. The museum covers the Second Spanish Period (1784-1821) medical practices. The museum is open seven days a week from 9 a.m. to 5 p.m. Tours start on demand throughout the day and cover a surgical demonstration, apothecary demonstration, and a visit to a medicinal herb garden.

== History ==
During the British occupation of St. Augustine 1763-1783 a Scottish carpenter named William Watson purchased and remodeled the building into a dwelling. The hospital was a three part facility consisting of Hospital West (constructed in the First Spanish Period), Hospital East (constructed during the British Period) and the Apothecary in the William Watson House (constructed in the British Period). These three parts plus their outbuildings and gardens functioned as a hospital complex during the Second Spanish Period. Aviles Street (which runs between the two wings of the hospital) was called Hospital Street until it was renamed in 1924.

The hospital was strictly a military facility; only military were treated there and only military personnel worked on the staff.

Hospital West burned in 1818 and the remaining parts of the hospital stayed in operation until two years into the American Territorial Period and officially closed down in 1823. Hospital East was destroyed in the fire of 1895. The Watson House still stands today.

== Reconstruction ==
Early in 1966, the St. Augustine Historical Restoration and Preservation Commission (later renamed the Historic St. Augustine Preservation Board) reconstructed the Spanish Military Hospital as it appeared in the 1790s on its original foundations. Upon its completion, a suggestion was made by Dr. William M. Straight, historian of the Florida Medical Association, that the building be utilized as a medical museum. The idea was enthusiastically received by the commission, and plans were accordingly drawn. A local coordinating committee, headed by Dr. James DeVito, was appointed and funds sought from the Medical Association's membership beginning in 1967. The reconstructed Hospital East building was dedicated and opened to the public in 1968. Shops now exist on the lot where Hospital West was located.

== Museum ==
The reconstructed Hospital East building was opened in 1968. On the second floor, the Medical Museum was dedicated and opened to the public in July 1973. It was jointly sponsored by the Florida Medical Association, its Woman's Auxiliary, and the Historic St. Augustine Preservation Board and included exhibits about medical history. However, due to costs, the building was closed in 1977. The property was leased for commercial purposes until 1990, when the Historic St. Augustine Preservation Board reopened the museum on July 20 as part of the Restored San Agustín Antiguo living history program. Today, the building is owned by the State of Florida, managed on its behalf by the University of Florida, and operated by a private business. Tours recreate the hospital practices of the late 18th century. They include a full surgical demonstration of procedures done at the time, an apothecary demonstration discussing the medicines used and their manufacture, and a tour of the medicinal herb gardens.

== See also ==
- William Watson House
