= Madeira Optics Museum =

Museum in Funchal, Madeira

Coordinates: 32.650280°N 16.911503°W

The Madeira Optics Museum, also known as Museu de Óptica da Madeira, is a specialized museum located in Funchal, Madeira that showcases a permanent collection of optics-related devices.

This museum features objects from all areas of optics, acquired all around the world, and have been collected from the 1960s until nowadays.

== The Collectors ==
In the 1960s, the love for engineering and history led one person - Rui Aguilar - to start collecting optics related devices. Initially without a defined purpose of creating a museum, the collection kept growing progressively until nowadays. In 2014, the idea for the creation of the Madeira Optics Museum sparked from a conversation between Rui Aguilar and its son, Sergio Aguilar, who since then is working alongside its father in the creation and organization of the museum. Currently, Rui and Sérgio Aguilar work together in the selection, acquisition cataloguing and preparation of every accession and on the organization of the physical area of the museum.

== The Collection ==
About 2000 objects are on permanent display at the museum. The categories with bigger relevance are:

- Telescopes
- Binoculars
- Movie cameras
- Movie projectors
- Photography cameras
- Medical devices
- Microscopes
- Military equipment
- Topography equipment

== The Building ==
The building where the Madeira Optics Museum operates is dated from the end of the 19th century, and it's registered as a Class 1 protected building in terms of special architectural or historic interest. As such, the building still maintains nearly all of the initial characteristics and facade. Recently this building has been subject to minor interior and exterior restoration works with the supervision of Funchal's city hall that targeted the requalification of the museum area and surroundings.
