= Medical museum =

Type of museum

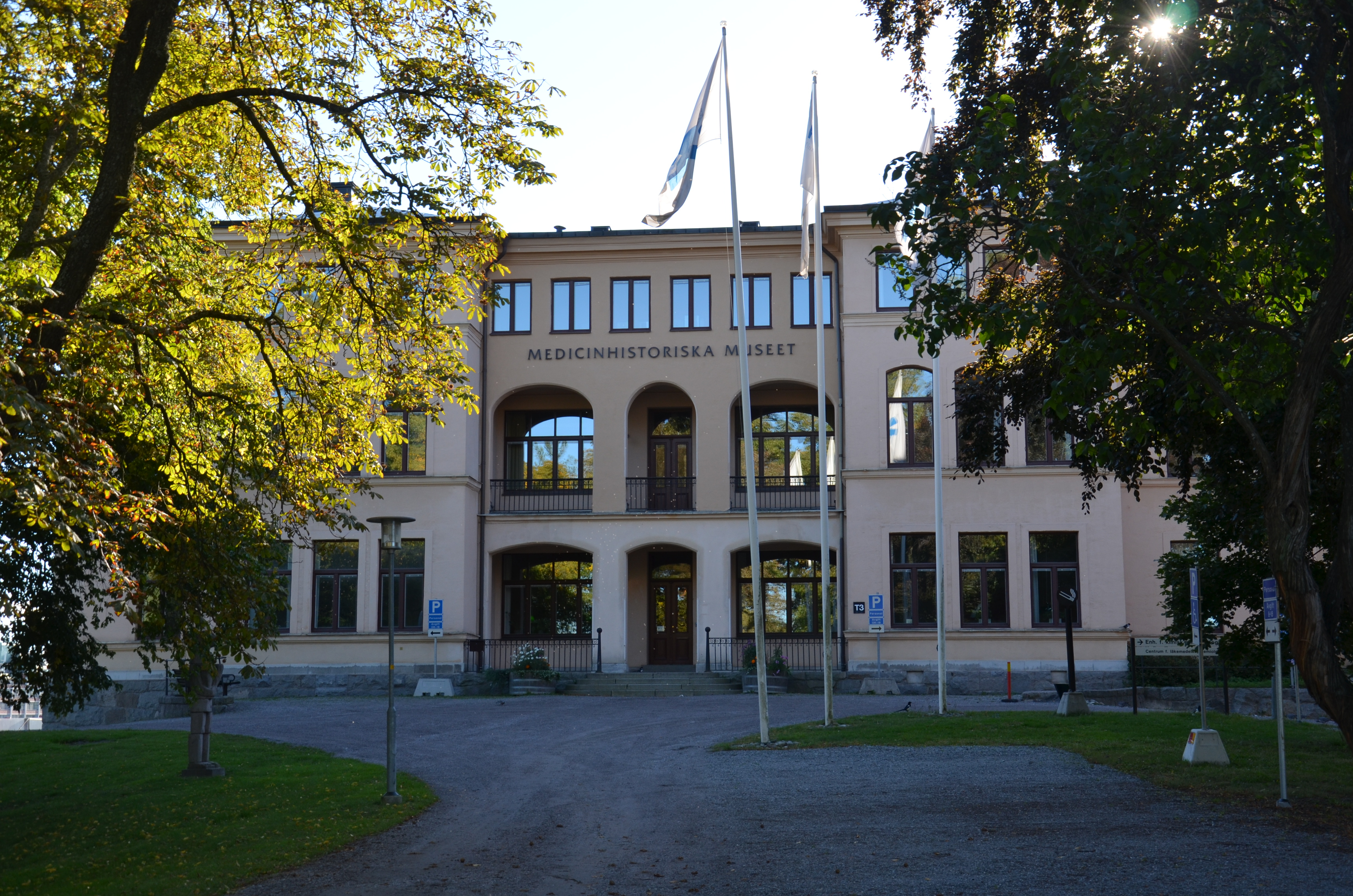
The History of Medicine Museum, Stockholm

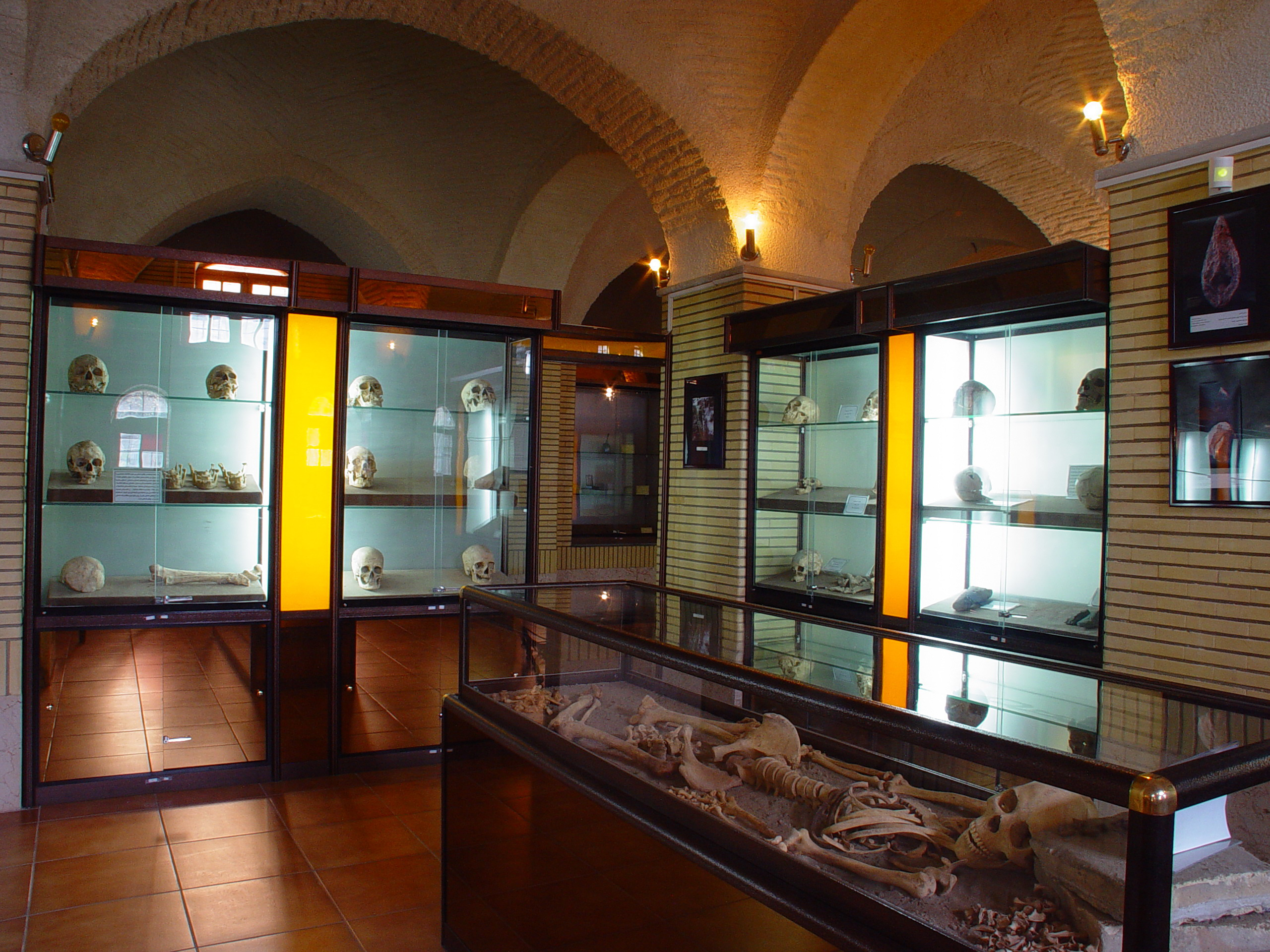
Exhibition in the History Museum of Medicine of the Tehran University.

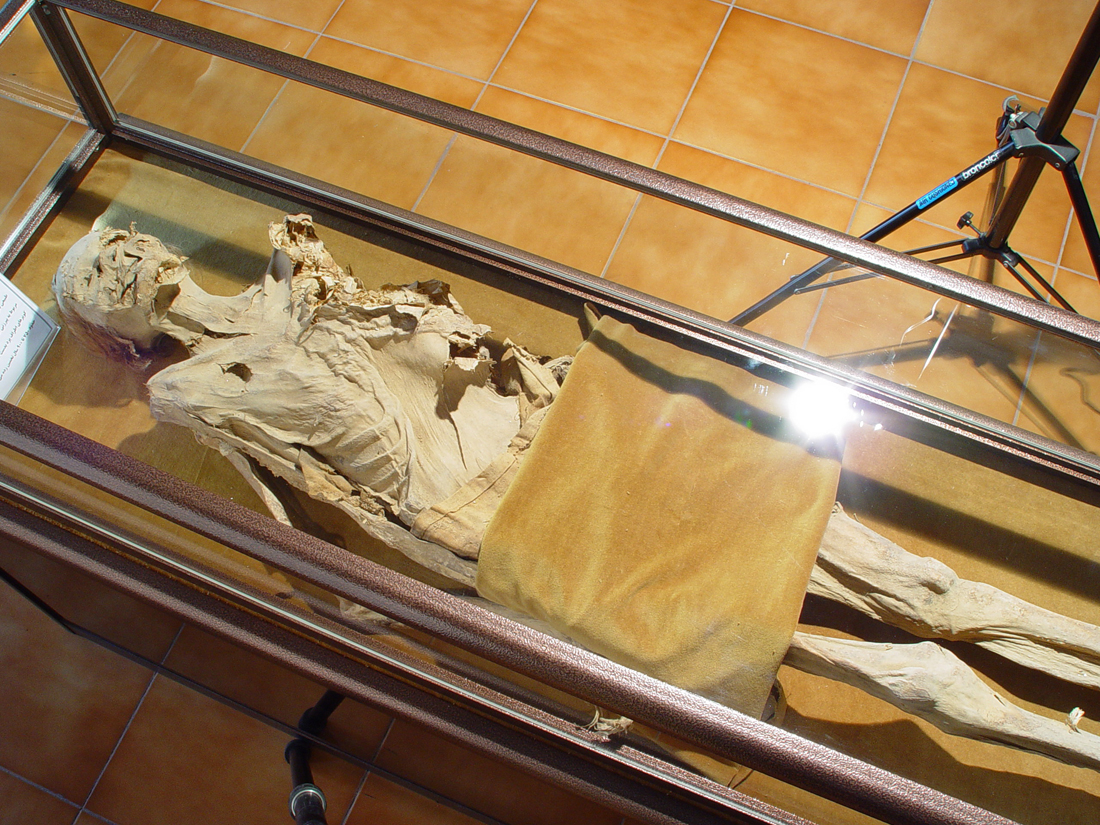
A skeleton in the Iranian National Museum of Medical Sciences, Tehran

A medical museum is an institution that stores and exhibits objects of historical, scientific, artistic, or cultural interest that have a link to medicine or health. Displays often include models, instruments, books and manuscripts, as well as medical images and the technologies used to capture them (such as X-ray machines). Some museums reflect specialized medical areas, such as dentistry, nursing, this history of specific hospitals, and historic pharmacies.

Professional organisations of medical museums include the Medical Museums Association, who publish The Watermark (the quarterly publication of the Archivists and Librarians in the History of the Health Sciences), and The London Museums of Health & Medicine.

== History ==
Many medical museums have links with medical training providers, such as medical schools or colleges, and often their collections were used in medical education. They were often private, "granting access only to students and practising physicians".

The starting point of all considerations on the historical development of modern museums is contained in the solution of two problems; collecting problem and institutionalization problem.

=== Collecting ===
A collection is a precondition for the existence of a museum, and the collection and preservation of certain objects is a precondition for the creation of a collection. In this sense, collecting has often been the basis on which significant collections have been formed throughout history. Thus, e.g. collecting a wide variety of objects, from works of art, through scientific instruments, technical inventions to natural rarities, was closely linked to Roman conquests, which ...

After the conquest of Greece and Asia in the second century BC, and great interest for the Greek cultural heritage that was transferred to Rome resulted in the creation of not only private but also public collections, libraries and botanical gardens.

In addition to collecting rare and marvelous things, collectors also collected medical items, and so many artifacts were found not only in collectors' collections of doctors and pharmacists, but, more or less sporadically, in many offices, churches and even individual homes. This primarily refers to objects that have been attributed to magical, religious and therapeutic properties (relics, bezoars, corals and objects of Narwhal tusk), etc.

Collections, which at the beginning of the development of human civilization was religious medicine, as one of the earliest represented forms of healing, in Mesopotamia in ancient Greece, the Roman Empire, etc., the first collectors' collections were formed even before the emergence of Renaissance cabinets of rarity - considered the forerunners of modern museums. Institutionalization Although collecting alone does not always and necessarily lead to its institutionalization, on the basis of current knowledge, studies on presenting the museum's past, these problems are interconnected.

Accordingly, the museums of medicine have found out of individuals' preferences for collecting, which has most often been the basis on which significant medical collections have been formed throughout history, and subsequently the medical museums we know today.

== First Museums ==
Similar to Aristotle's Lyceum, similar establishments were established in Alexandria, Pergamon, Syracuse, Sicily, and Rhodes, but of which Alexandria, known as the Museum of Alexandria, reached its greatest glory.

=== Alexandria Museum ===
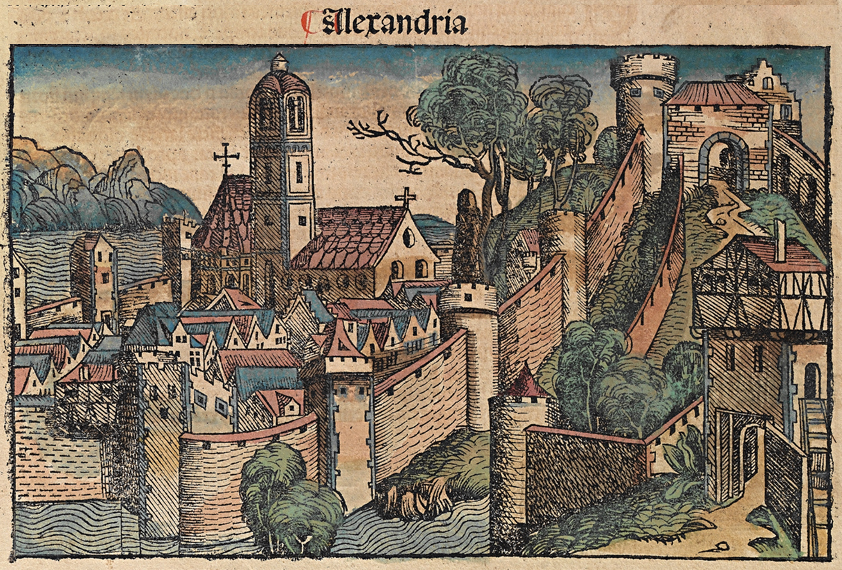
Alexandria, is the city where the empiricist school was founded, which also had its own medical collection

One of the first museums to have a medical collection was a library established at Alexandria School of Medicine. Concerning the Library of Alexandria and the Medical Museum, there is doubt as to whether it was a unified institution or not. It is also uncertain whether their founder was Ptolemy I Soter 20 or his son Ptolemy Philadelphia. Also, the literature states that Demetrius of Phaleron, a peripatetic philosopher and disciple of Theophrastus, and perhaps Aristotle, who began to collect books for library from all over the world during the reign of Ptolemy I Soter, played an important role in the founding of the Library. . The idea of forming a library containing universal works is linked to the expansionist policy of Alexander the Great, which was close to the Ptolemies. Alexander believed that the domination of the world required learning about the thinking and languages of different civilizations through the study of their texts.

Not only mathematicians, physicists, astronomers, inventors and philosophers, such as Archimedes, Aristarchus of Samos, Euclid and Eratosthenes, have found fame in the Alexandrian Museum throughout history, but also physicians. Thanks to Herophil of Chalcedon (335 - 280 BC) and Erasistratus of Samos (330 - 250 BC).

Within this Museum, the Alexandria Medical School was created and became famous for its achievements, especially in the field of anatomy and physiology. Heprophy, most likely influenced by the Egyptian tradition of body embalming, was the first physician to investigate the human body through autopsy and vivisection, establishing a scientific method and describing the structure of many organs.

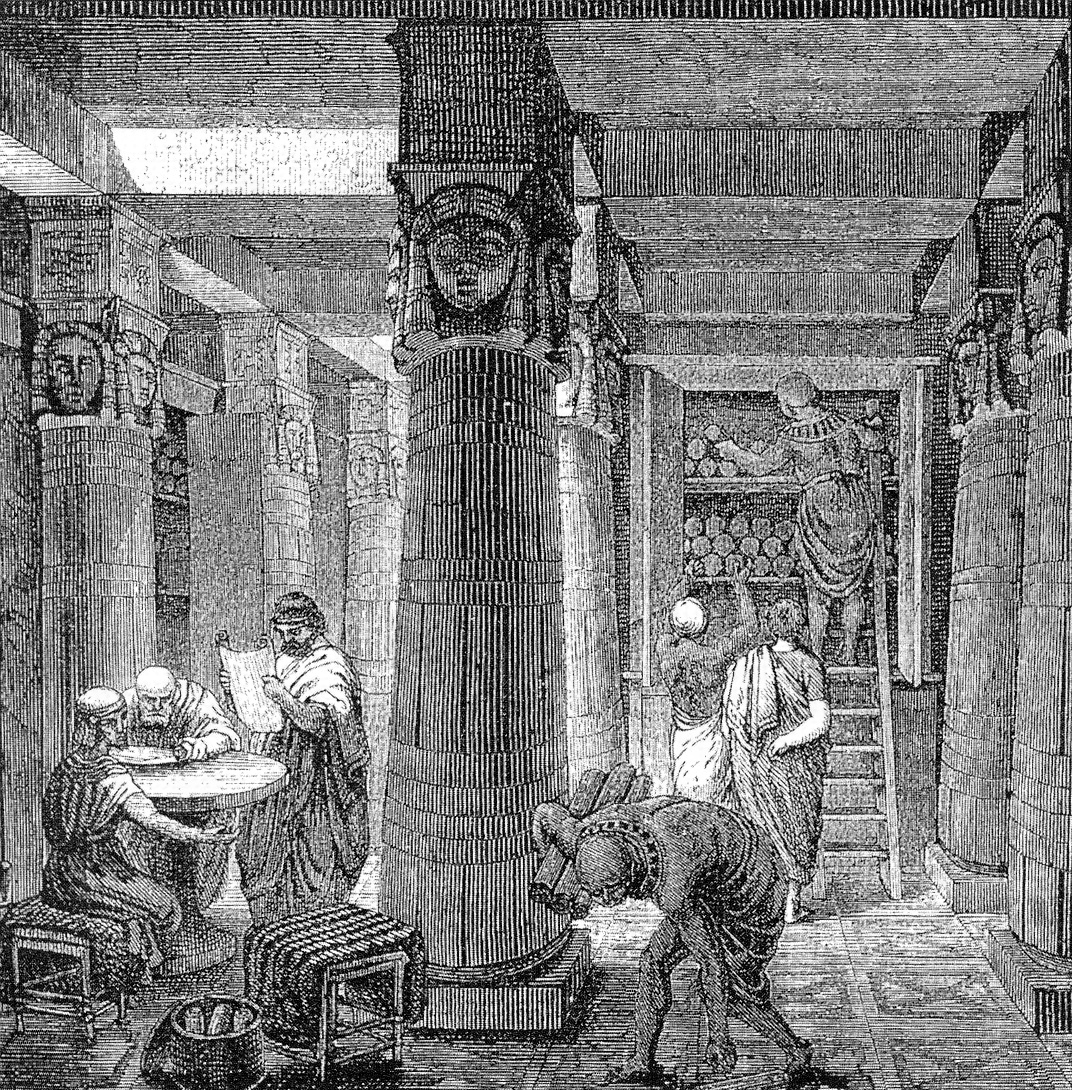
The Alexandriks Library was a treasure trove of about 700,000 written rolls (of all the richest human knowledge so far, the richest in the world).

The museum in Alexandria was, as an integral part of an academy or university, a meeting place of different cultures, scientific debates and discoveries, a place of learning and "concentrating" the knowledge of the Hellenistic world, because, as Pomjan says, it was not a museum in today's sense of the word, and therefore "no owes its glory to no collection, but rather to its library and the team of scientists who have formed a community within its walls, " though in terms of art collecting There are different opinions in the Alexandrian Museum.

When the Muslim army conquered Alexandria in 642, after defeating the Byzantine army at Battle of Heliopolis, the commander asked Caliph Umar what to do with the museum and library, or books. He gave the famous answer: "They are either contrary to the Koran, which means that they are heretical, or they agree with him, which means that they are superfluous."

In 2002, eleven stores of glass and concrete were erected on the coast where the ruins were located. On the granite wall facing south, the letters of most of the scriptures are engraved, which is a kind of promotion of national, cultural and linguistic diversity preserved in this building. It has the largest public reading room in the world, as well as specialized ones: children's books, rare books, manuscripts and microfilms. An integral part of it is the Museum, also modeled after ancient times.

=== Rarity Cabinets ===
A rarity cabinet, or Italian studios, originated in the Renaissance cultural milieu and thus established a new model of collecting. As the Renaissance period was crucial for the development of medical sciences, primarily anatomy, which was still based on Galen's second-century teachings, medical subjects in the Renaissance offices were more numerous and varied than in medieval treasuries. In addition to mummified parts of the human body and skeletal remains, there were more and more medical and scientific instruments in the collections.

Otherwise, the cabinet of rarities themselves was usually one or more square or rectangular rooms, interconnected, holding art and natural objects that had "rare and unusual features", with the division of collections into artistic (Latin: curiosa) artificalia and natural rarities (Latin: curiosa naturalia).

== Museums in the 19th and early 20th centuries ==
In the late 19th and early 20th century, a new concept of medical museums was developed, largely influenced by the development of education and industrialization, which, unlike education, had a detrimental effect on the life and health of the working class of the Western world. The industrialization of individual countries, accompanied by the increasing migration of population to large industrial centers, has resulted in the intensive development and consolidation of cities, as well as the increasingly ill, exposed to poor hygienic conditions in factories and workers' settlements. Under the new conditions, a stronger development of museums is occurring as part of the general culture and memory of a people, and among them the first medical museums aimed at the general public, among other things, with the aim of enlightening the population. In medical museums, visitors were required to acquire new knowledge about the structure of the human body, the functioning of organs and organ systems, and information about healthy lifestyles, infectious diseases and their prevention. In order to bring their exhibitions closer to the numerous visitors of different educational levels, interactive museum exhibits were used, using modern technical means of communication with the public - sound conferences with recorded contents, diaries and slides, films, models of the human body and more.

== Ethical debates ==
High-profile medical exhibitions such as Body Worlds and Bodies: The Exhibition, have spurred debate as to the ethics and value of such displays. Historians such as Samuel Alberti have sought to place this "tension between education and sensation" into a broader historical context of freak shows and anatomy displays.

Projects such as Exceptional & Extraordinary have engaged with such controversy and used it as a platform to "examine our attitudes towards difference and aim to stimulate debate around the implications of a society that values some lives more than others."

== See also ==
- List of medical museums
- Hospital museum
