= List of people from St. Augustine, Florida =

The following is a list of notable people who were born or who live or formerly lived in the city of St. Augustine, Florida.

== Notable people ==
=== Arts and entertainment ===
- Steve Berry, bestselling author, resides in St. Augustine
- Richard Boone, actor
- James Branch Cabell, novelist
- Doug Carn, jazz musician
- Ray Charles, pianist, singer, composer
- Earl Cunningham, artist
- Frederick Delius, composer
- Martin Johnson Heade, artist
- Zora Neale Hurston, novelist and folklorist
- Jacob Lawrence, artist
- Andrew Nagorski, journalist and author
- David Nolan, author and historian
- Tom Pearson, multidisciplinary artist, poet, choreographer
- Steph Post, author
- Marjorie Kinnan Rawlings, novelist
- Marcus Roberts, musician
- Gamble Rogers, folk singer
- Steven L. Sears, television writer, screenwriter, producer, actor, author
- Kurt St. Thomas, author and filmmaker
- Nathan Sturgis, former soccer player who last played for Seattle Sounders FC

=== Athletics ===
- Cris Carpenter, major league baseball pitcher
- Willie Galimore, football star
- Willie Irvin, Philadelphia Eagles football player
- Scott Lagasse, race car driver
- Scott Lagasse Jr., race car driver
- Bill Snowden, race car driver
- Steve Spurrier, college/pro (American) football coach

=== Religion, service and politics ===
- Andrew Anderson, physician, St. Augustine mayor
- Jorge Biassou, Haitian revolutionary and black Spanish general
- Albert Boyd, member of National Aviation Hall of Fame
- George J. F. Clarke, surveyor general of Spanish East Florida
- Nicholas de Concepcion, escaped slave who became a Spanish privateer and pirate captain
- Alexander Darnes, born a slave, became a well-known physician
- Edmund Jackson Davis, governor of Texas
- Kathleen Deagan, archaeologist
- Frederick Dent, general and brother-in-law of Ulysses Grant
- Audrey Nell Edwards, civil rights hero
- Henry Flagler, industrialist
- Michael Gannon, historian
- William H. Gray, U.S. congressman and president of the United Negro College Fund
- Martin Davis Hardin, Union general in the Civil War
- Robert Hayling, civil rights leader
- Stetson Kennedy, author and human rights activist
- William W. Loring, Confederate general
- Albert Manucy, historian, author, Fulbright Scholar
- Howell W. Melton, United States district judge
- Pedro Menéndez de Avilés, founder of St. Augustine in 1565
- Prince Achille Murat, nephew of Napoleon Bonaparte
- Osceola, Seminole War leader (held prisoner at Fort Marion, now Castillo de San Marcos)
- Verle Pope, state legislator
- Richard Henry Pratt, soldier and educator
- John M. Schofield, Union general
- Edmund Kirby Smith, Confederate general
- John B. Stetson Jr. philanthropist and diplomat
- Felix Varela, Cuban national hero
- Augustin Verot, first bishop of St. Augustine
- Patty Wagstaff, member of National Aviation Hall of Fame
- DeWitt Webb, physician, St. Augustine mayor, state representative
- Herbert E. Wolfe, businessman, banker, and mayor of St. Augustine, Florida.
- David Levy Yulee, first Jewish U.S. senator, Levy County and Yulee, Florida namesake
- Agustin V. Zamorano, pioneer printer and provisional governor of California
