= Lawrence Lewis =

Lawrence Lewis may refer to:

- Lawrence Lewis (1767–1839), nephew of George Washington
- Lawrence Lewis (cricketer) (1889-1947), Australian cricketer
- Lawrence Lewis (politician) (1879–1943), U.S. Representative from Colorado
- Lawrence Lewis Jr. (1918–1995), American businessman and philanthropist; involved in founding Flagler College
