= Herbert E. Wolfe =

American politician

Mayor of St. Augustine, Florida
- In office 1947–1948

Personal details
- Born: Herbert Edward Wolfe; November 3, 1897; Goodlettsville, Tennessee, U.S.
- Died: March 3, 1981 (aged 83); Flagler Hospital, St. Augustine, Florida, U.S.
- Spouse: Virgie Phelan Parrish (m. 1917)
- Children: 3 adopted
- Profession: Politician, businessman, banker, philanthropist, farmer
- Awards: Order of La Florida (1977)

Herbert Edward Wolfe (November 3, 1897 – March 3, 1981) was an American businessman, banker, philanthropist, farmer, and mayor of St. Augustine, Florida.

== Early life ==
Herbert Edward Wolfe was born on November 3, 1897, in Goodlettsville, Tennessee, the oldest of eight brothers. He went to Tennessee public schools but did not go to college. He moved to St. Augustine in 1917 and lived there until he died in 1981. He purchased Markland from the descendants of Andrew Anderson.

== Business ==
In 1923, Wolfe started the H.E. Wolfe Construction Company, which constructed road work in Tennessee, Mississippi, Alabama, South Carolina, Georgia, and Florida. Between 1926 and 1956 Wolfe organized the San Marco Contracting Company. He served as president and chairman of the board of Rogers Manufacturing Company, which made heavy trailers and truck bodies. He served as a director with and vice president of the Florida East Coast Railway, and he served on the Florida Industrial Commission.

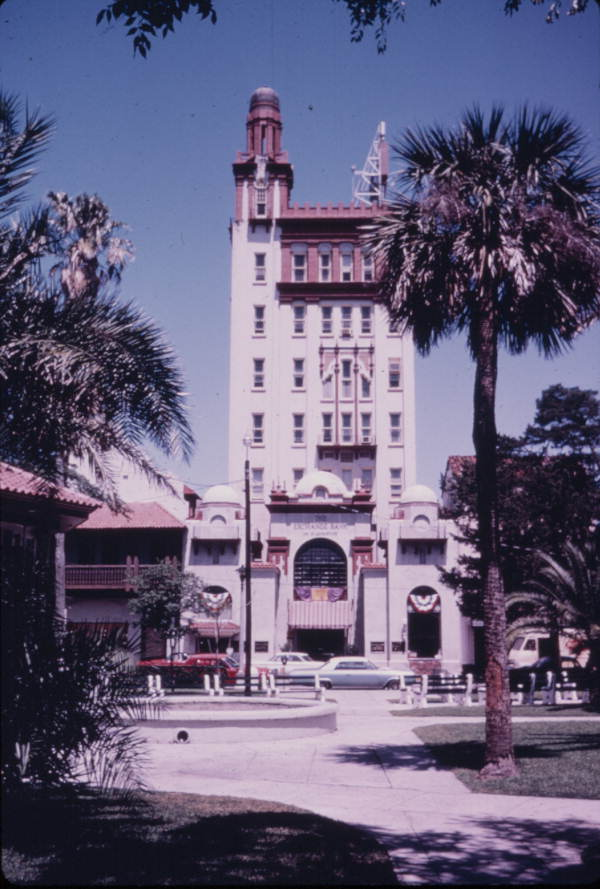
Exchange Bank of St. Augustine

In addition to his farming and construction business, Herbert Wolfe was also heavily involved in the banking industry in Northeast Florida. He organized three separate Exchange Banks: the Exchange Bank of St. Augustine opened in 1934, the Hastings Exchange Bank in Hastings, Florida opened in 1950, and the Exchange Bank of Palatka in Palatka, Florida opened in 1956. In St. Augustine he served as officer and chairman, in Hastings as a director, and in Palatka as president and chairman of the board. The St. Augustine and Hastings banks eventually became part of the Atlantic National Bank in Jacksonville, while the Palatka branch was sold in 1959.

== Political life ==
For four years (1944–1948) Wolfe served on the city commission of St. Augustine. From 1947-1948 he was mayor of St. Augustine, a post previously held by his younger brother, O. D. Wolfe, from 1942-1943. He was involved in successful political campaigns for Florida senators; he served as campaign treasurer for both George Smathers in his 1950 campaign and Spessard Holland in his 1959 campaign. Wolfe's role in the controversial 1950 defeat of Florida Senator Claude Pepper is dealt with in Tracy Danese's book "Claude Pepper and Ed Ball" (University Press of Florida 2000).

== Personal life and legacy ==
Wolfe married his wife Virgie Phelan Parrish in 1917 and they adopted three children; Helen, Marshall, and Charles. He was a member of many community organizations including the Kiwanis Club, the Newcomen Society of North America, Scottish Rite bodies, Morocco Temple, the Royal Order of Jesters, and St. Augustine Shrine Club. In 1967 Wolfe received the first Rotary Community Service Award for outstanding contributions to the community. Wolfe was the second person to receive the Order of La Florida from the City of St. Augustine in 1977.

During his lifetime he served on the board of many local, state, and national organizations including the Florida State Chamber of Commerce, the American Fire and Casualty Company, Flagler Hospital, Lightner Museum, Flagler College, Florida Southern College (where he held the honorary title of Chancellor), the Florida Industrial Commission, the Children's Home Society in Jacksonville, the Eastern States Brangus Association, the Department of Defense Small Business Advisory Committee, and the National Highway Safety Committee under President Dwight D. Eisenhower. Wolfe's role in opposing the civil rights movement is dealt with in several award winning books, including David Colburn's Racial Change and Community Crisis: St. Augustine 1877-1980 (Columbia University Press, 1985).

In St. Augustine, he was known for championing historic preservation efforts. He was the first chairman of the St. Augustine Historical Restoration and Preservation Commission (later to become the Historic St. Augustine Preservation Board) as well as chairman of the Federal Quadricentennial Committee appointed by President John F. Kennedy. In 1969 he resigned from the Preservation Commission due to health problems.

Wolfe died on March 3, 1981, at Flagler Hospital in St. Augustine, Florida, at the age of 83.

The Herbert E. Wolfe Papers are housed at the St. Augustine Historical Society Research Library in St. Augustine.
