= Manucy =

Manucy is a surname. Notable people with the surname include:

- Albert Manucy (1910–1997), American writer and historian
- Dominic Manucy (1828–1885), American Roman Catholic bishop
