= Matanzas River =

River in Florida, United States

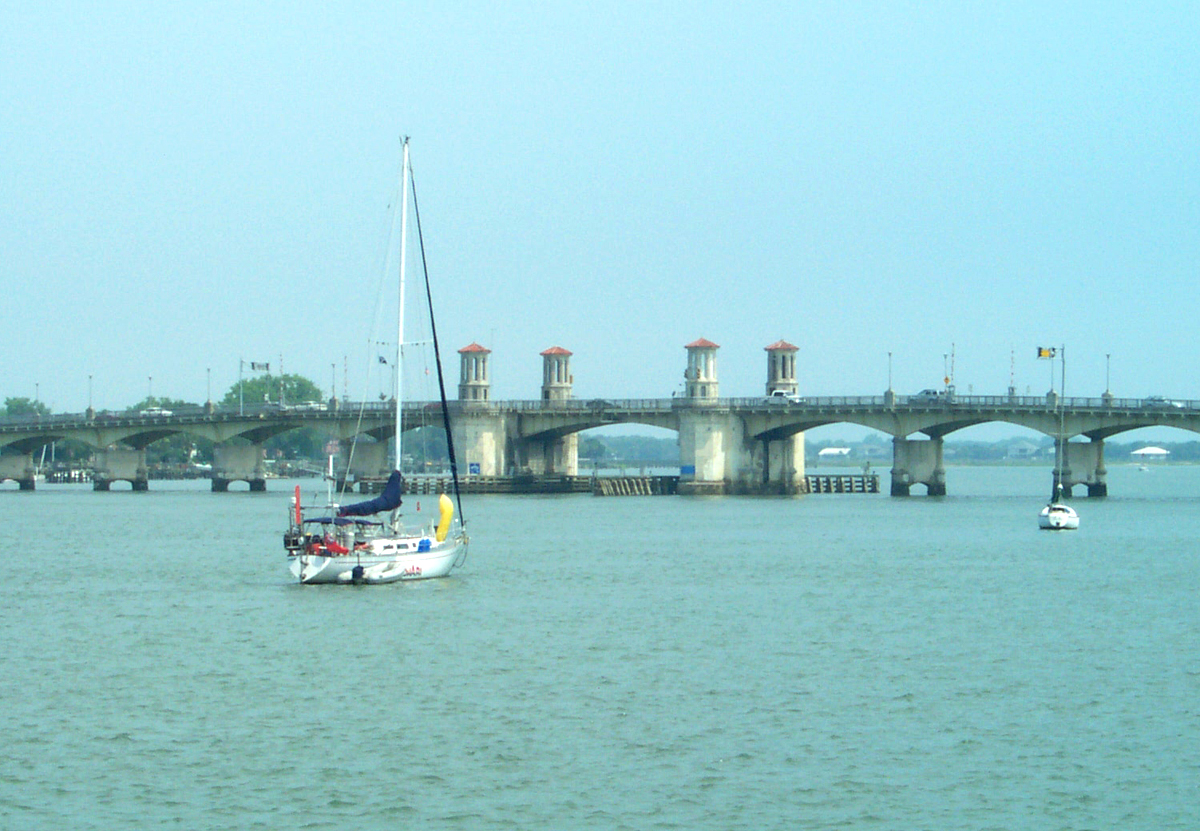
- Bridge of Lions across the Matanzas River

- Location of mouth

Location
- Country: United States
- State: Florida
- County: St. Johns, Flagler

Physical characteristics
- Mouth: Atlantic Ocean
  - coordinates: 29.9138577°N 81.2836827°W
- Length: 23 mi (37 km)

The Matanzas River is a body of water in St. Johns and Flagler counties in the U.S. state of Florida. It is a narrow saltwater bar-bounded estuary sheltered from the Atlantic Ocean by Anastasia Island. The river is part of the Atlantic Intracoastal Waterway.

The Matanzas River is 23 miles (37 km) in length and extends from St. Augustine Inlet southward to approximately 6.5 miles (10.5 km) south of the Matanzas Inlet on the southern tip of Anastasia Island. The waterbody connects ocean inlets in the Port of St. Augustine and at the Fort Matanzas National Monument. The Matanzas River does not flow in one direction, as it is tidally influenced by the two inlets. The river has a tidal range of up to 6 feet (1.8 m).

The Matanzas River at St. Augustine was the main entrance to the historic city, America's oldest port. The body of water is often referred to as the Matanzas Harbor in the immediate vicinity of the city's waterfront. The southern portion of the Matanzas River was traditionally considered the "backdoor" to the city of St. Augustine, and control of the river was considered a strategic necessity for the early Spanish colony at St. Augustine. Spanish engineers and laborers built Fort Matanzas in the 18th century to control access to the river from Matanzas Inlet, about 14 miles (23 km) south of St. Augustine.

The Matanzas River supports an extensive tidal marsh habitat. Extensive conservation efforts including the Matanzas marsh, Faver-Dykes State Park, Princess Place preservation area, Pellicer Place preservation area, Pellicer Creek Aquatic Preserve, the Guana Tolomato Matanzas National Estuarine Research Reserve, and the Moses Creek conservation area have been established to preserve the ecosystem. The preserved areas include salt marshes, mangrove tidal wetlands, oyster bars, estuarine lagoons, upland habitat, and marine environments. The Matanzas River faces several pollution issues, mostly related to urbanization in St. Augustine and the northern portion of Anastasia Island.

Three major bridges cross the Matanzas River: the Bridge of Lions and the Mickler-O'Connell Bridge carrying Florida State Road 312 between St. Augustine and Anastasia Island, and the Crescent Beach Bridge (Verle Allen Pope Bridge) carrying State Road 206 across the river to Crescent Beach.

The Matanzas River was named by Spanish forces for a massacre, led by Pedro Menéndez de Avilés of Spain, of a group of several hundred shipwrecked French Huguenots from Fort Caroline, led by Jean Ribault. The Huguenots were executed somewhere near the present site of Matanzas Inlet in 1565. Menéndez had been ordered to kill all Protestants he found in the New World. "Matanzas" means "killings" or "slaughters" in Spanish. Matanzas is thus the tenth-oldest surviving European place-name in the US.

== See also ==
- List of rivers of Florida
- List of rivers of the Americas by coastline
