= Reynolds, Smith & Hills =

RS&H, Inc.
- Company type: Private
- Industry: Architecture, Engineering, Consulting
- Founded: 1941; 85 years ago
- Headquarters: Jacksonville, Florida, USA
- Key people: Lisa M. Robert PE, CEO; Amy Davis, CFO
- Services: Transportation - Infrastructure; Aviation; Aerospace & Defense; Corporate; and Transportation - Construction Management
- Number of employees: 1850 (2025)
- Website: www.rsandh.com

RS&H, Inc. (RS&H) is an employee-owned architectural, engineering, planning, and environmental services corporation headquartered in Jacksonville, Florida. They also provide clients with facilities and infrastructure consulting.

== Beginnings ==
The company was founded in 1941 and grew slowly through the years before being purchased in 1987 by Hunter Environmental Services. Three years later, after negotiating for a year, a group of eight senior RS&H employees that included Leerie Jenkins and David Robertson bought the company's architecture, engineering and planning operations and incorporated in the State of Florida in 1989. Their goal was to rebuild the company and concentrate on its specialties. The firm is one of Florida's largest privately held architectural service companies with 26 offices located in ten Florida cities, as well as California, Colorado, Georgia, Illinois, Michigan, Minnesota, Missouri, North Carolina, Ohio, Texas, Utah and Virginia.

RS&H operates in five segments:

1. Transportation - Infrastructure group provides services to state and local government authorities for all modes of transportation, including highways, transit, rail, and ports. Projects include:
  - Bridge of Lions rehabilitation, Florida Department of Transportation, St. Augustine, Florida
  - State Road 429 Interchange, Orange County Expressway Authority, Orlando, Florida
2. Aviation group serves airports, airlines, governmental agencies, and private clients, providing services for terminals and support buildings, airfield facilities, and planning and environmental services. Projects include:
  - New runway, Chicago O'Hare International Airport, Chicago, Illinois
  - Terminal & De-icing system, Detroit Metro Airport, Detroit, Michigan
3. Aerospace and Defense group services NASA, Department of Defense, and commercial aerospace contractors in the development of launch and other facilities. Projects include:
  - Vehicle Assembly Building Roof, NASA, Cape Canaveral, Florida
  - Movable Work Platform, Kennedy Space Center
4. Corporate group provides comprehensive services, including facility design, land development, facility planning, and construction management to corporate, commercial and industrial clients. Projects include:
  - Brown & Brown Corporate Headquarters, Daytona, Florida
  - Wells Fargo North Florida Headquarters, Jacksonville, Florida
5. Transportation - Construction Management group serves numerous state departments of transportation, mobility/transportation authorities, turnpike/toll authorities, rail/port authorities, municipal/county governments, and private clients throughout the United States. Projects include:
  - SunPass Seminole Expressway in Seminole County, Florida
  - US Route 460 Connector Phase I, Breaks, Virginia

== Historic project ==
In 2004, RS&H was awarded the contract for design and engineering the reconstruction of the Bridge of Lions in St. Augustine, Florida. The $77 million job was expected to take five years to complete. In order to retain the historic character and structural integrity within space constraints, the design required numerous innovations and unusual construction methods.

Roads & Bridges magazine named the Bridge of Lions as fourth in the nation's top 10 bridges for 2010. Projects were evaluated based on size, community impact and challenges resolved.

== Incident ==
On November 6, 2009, Jason Rodriguez, a former employee who was dismissed in June 2007 for performance-based issues, entered the Orlando offices at RS&H and shots were fired. One person was killed and five others injured. He was arrested later that same day.

== See also ==
- Architecture of Jacksonville
