= Bridge of Lions =

Bridge in Florida, United States of America

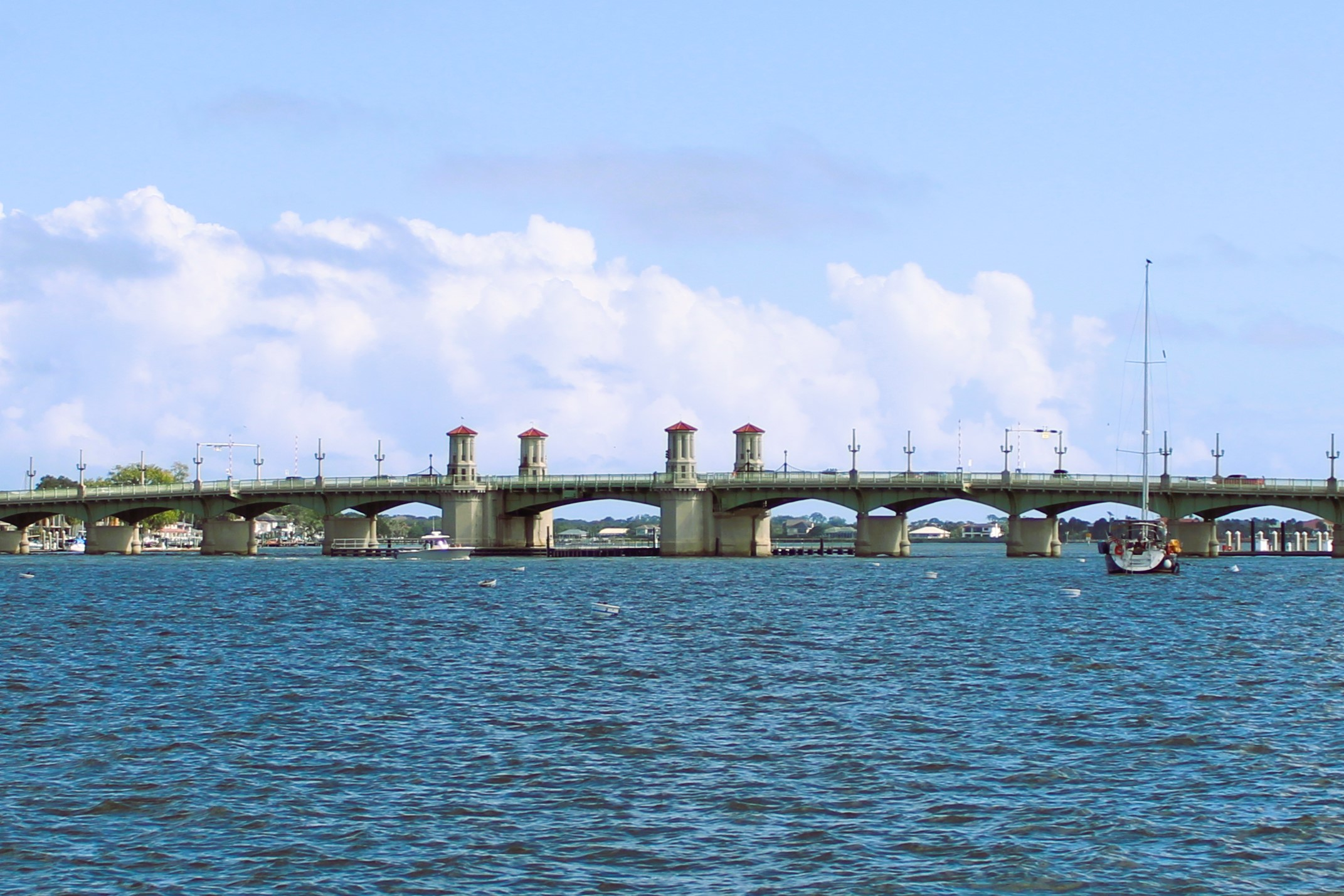
- View of the bridge from Castillo de San Marcos in 2024
- Coordinates: 29°53′35″N 81°18′29″W
- Carries: Two general purpose lanes of SR A1A and two sidewalks
- Crosses: Matanzas River (Intracoastal Waterway)
- Locale: St. Augustine, Florida
- Official name: Bridge of Lions
- Maintained by: Florida Department of Transportation
- ID number: 780074

Characteristics
- Design: steel bascule bridge
- Total length: 1,545 feet (471 m)
- Width: 34 feet (10 m)
- Longest span: 87 feet (27 m)
- Clearance above: N/A
- Clearance below: 25 feet (7.6 m) closed

History
- Opened: February 26, 1927 (original bridge); March 17, 2010 (current bridge)
- Bridge of Lions
- U.S. National Register of Historic Places
- Location within Florida Location within the United States
- Location: St. Augustine, Florida United States
- Coordinates: 29°53′33″N 81°18′27″W
- Built: 1927
- Architect: J. E. Greiner Company
- NRHP reference No.: 82001040
- Added to NRHP: 19 November 1982

The Bridge of Lions is a double-leaf bascule bridge that spans the Intracoastal Waterway in St. Augustine, Florida, United States. A part of State Road A1A, it connects downtown St. Augustine to Anastasia Island across Matanzas Bay. A pair of copies of the marble Medici lions guard the bridge, begun in 1925 and completed in 1927. They were removed in February 2005 and returned in March 2011.

Roads & Bridges magazine named the Bridge of Lions as fourth in the nation's top 10 bridges for 2010. Projects were evaluated based on size, community impact and challenges resolved.

The United States Department of Transportation declared the bridge "structurally deficient and functionally obsolete" in 1999, prompting heated debates on what to do with the structure. A restoration plan was approved, but opponents continued to voice their opposition. In 2004, the Florida Department of Transportation awarded Reynolds, Smith and Hills Inc. the engineering and design contract estimated at $77 million, and projected to require five years to complete.

== First Bridge ==
Prior to the Bridge of Lions in 1925, there was a wooden bridge, called simply, "The Bridge to Anastasia Island" or "South Beach railroad bridge". It was built in 1895, and after a major renovation in 1904, the bridge could accommodate a trolley. The span contained no rise, and had a movable opening for ship traffic, and charged a toll for transit.

== Original Bridge of Lions ==
The old bridge frequently broke down, leading to calls for its replacement over the years. The man considered the "Father of the Bridge of Lions" was Henry Rodenbaugh, the vice president and bridge expert for Henry Flagler's Florida East Coast Railway. In the early 1920s he organized the bond issue to finance the new bridge, selected engineers J. E. Greiner Company to design it—and had his young daughter Jean pour the first bucket of concrete when the work began in 1925. Its construction came at the height of the extravagant Florida land boom of the 1920s, and the bridge is one of its greatest landmarks. It was designed not merely to carry cars, but to be a work of art, and it cost ten times as much as more prosaic bridges constructed nearby at the same time. It was completed after the land boom busted, and the 1927 dedication ceremony had to be paired with the annual Ponce de Leon Celebration in cash-strapped St. Augustine.

The Bridge of Lions is listed on the National Register of Historic Places and was included by the National Trust for Historic Preservation (NTHP) on its list of the "11 Most Endangered Historic Sites" in the nation for 1997. The Bridge of Lions was later featured on the cover of the Trust's 1999 engagement calendar.

From its earliest days, it was hailed as "The Most Beautiful Bridge in Dixie." It has long been a symbol of the nation's oldest city.

It gets its name from two Carrara marble Medici lions statues that are copies of those found in the Loggia dei Lanzi in Florence, Italy. The statues were a gift of Dr. Andrew Anderson (1839–1924), the builder of the Markland House, who spent the last decade of his life putting works of art in public places in the Ancient City. The statues were his last gift, and he did not live long enough to see them installed. He had them made by the Romanelli Studios in Florence, Italy, which a decade earlier had provided him with smaller versions which he displayed on the front steps at Markland. The Medici lions are also known for the copies placed in the Throne Room of the Royal Palace of Madrid.

== Temporary bridge ==
A temporary bridge was constructed adjacent to the original bridge and traffic was diverted to this structure while the original bridge was being rehabilitated and reconstructed to look like its predecessor. After nearly 80 years of service, an official closing ceremony for the original Bridge of Lions was held on May 26, 2006. Isabella Heard, one of the young girls on the lead float in the opening of the bridge in 1927, was there, in a wheelchair, to tie the ribbon for its closing 79 years later.

Several components of the original bridge were either rehabilitated or returned (as lost components) to the rehabilitated bridge. Primarily, the exterior or fascia steel girders were rehabilitated along with the bascule tower piers. Once the rehabilitation of the original bridge was completed, at a total project cost of $80 million and 4 percent over budget, the temporary bridge was removed and used as part of an artificial reef just offshore. The two lions were in safe storage for the duration of the construction.

== New Bridge of Lions ==
Renovation work was completed on March 17, 2010 when it reopened for use. Following the removal of the temporary bridge (to an offshore reef), and landscaping, the two white marble lion statues were returned after a 6-year absence, early in the morning of March 15, 2011, principally completing the bridge renovation project. Originally commissioned and donated by former St. Augustine Mayor and medical doctor, Andrew Anderson, the lions were named "Firm" and "Faithful". In 2015, two new granite lions, named "Pax" and "Peli" (Peace and Happiness), were added to the east side of the bridge. They were commissioned and donated to the city for the 450th commemoration of its founding by St. Augustine residents Wolfgang and Miki Schau.

The current bridge's west entrance features manicured gazebos, landscaped palm trees and a new publicly accessible dock extending partially into the bay. Currently per the Code of Federal Regulations, the bridge opens when requested by a vessel, but only on the hour and half hour between 7:00am and 6:00pm, excluding at 8:00am, 12:00pm, and 5:00pm on Monday through Friday other than federal holidays in the United States.

== Gallery ==
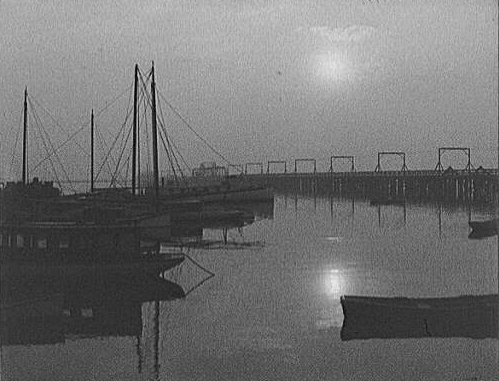
The original bridge to Anastasia Island, prior to the Bridge of Lions

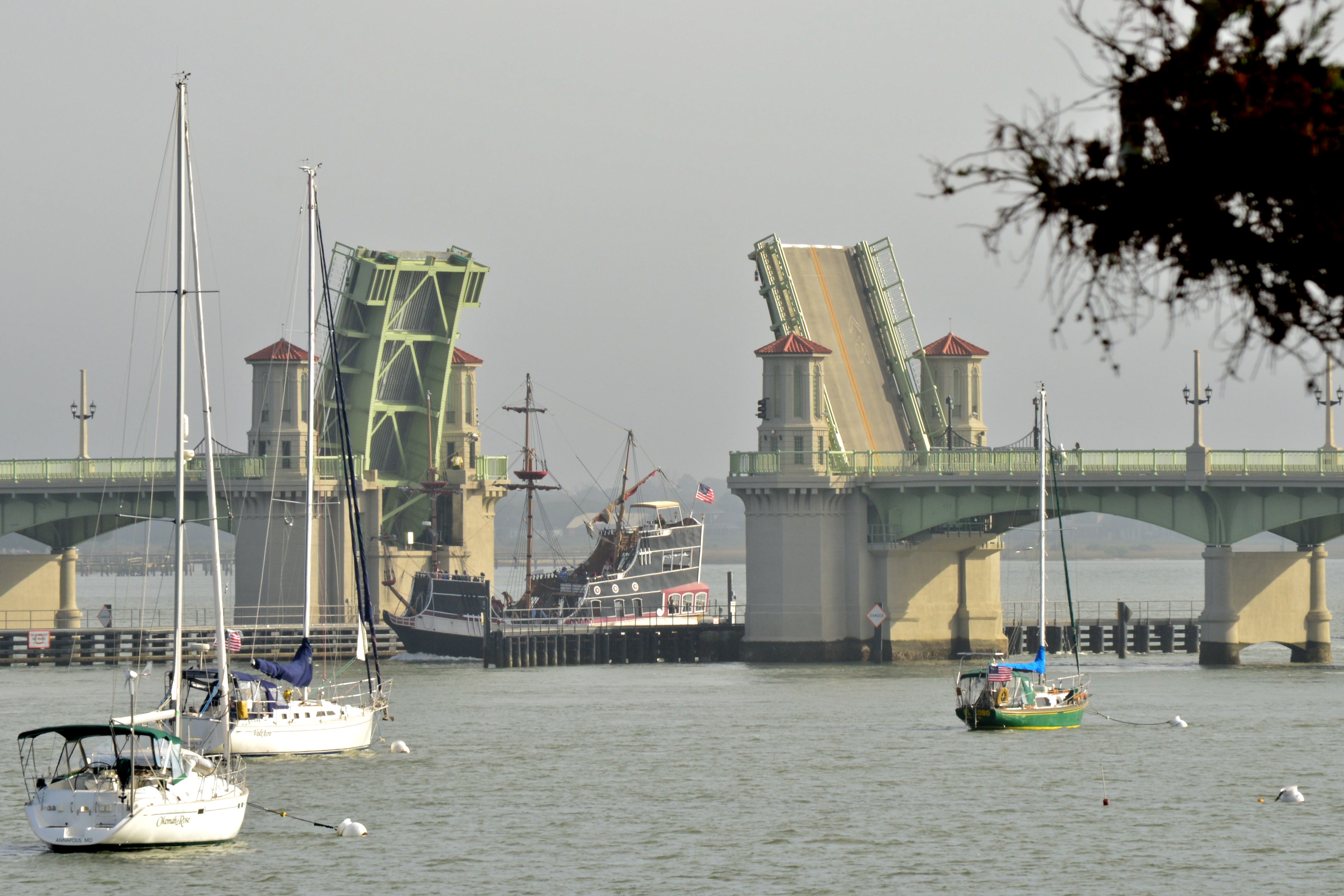
The bridge's bascule draw span open for a ship

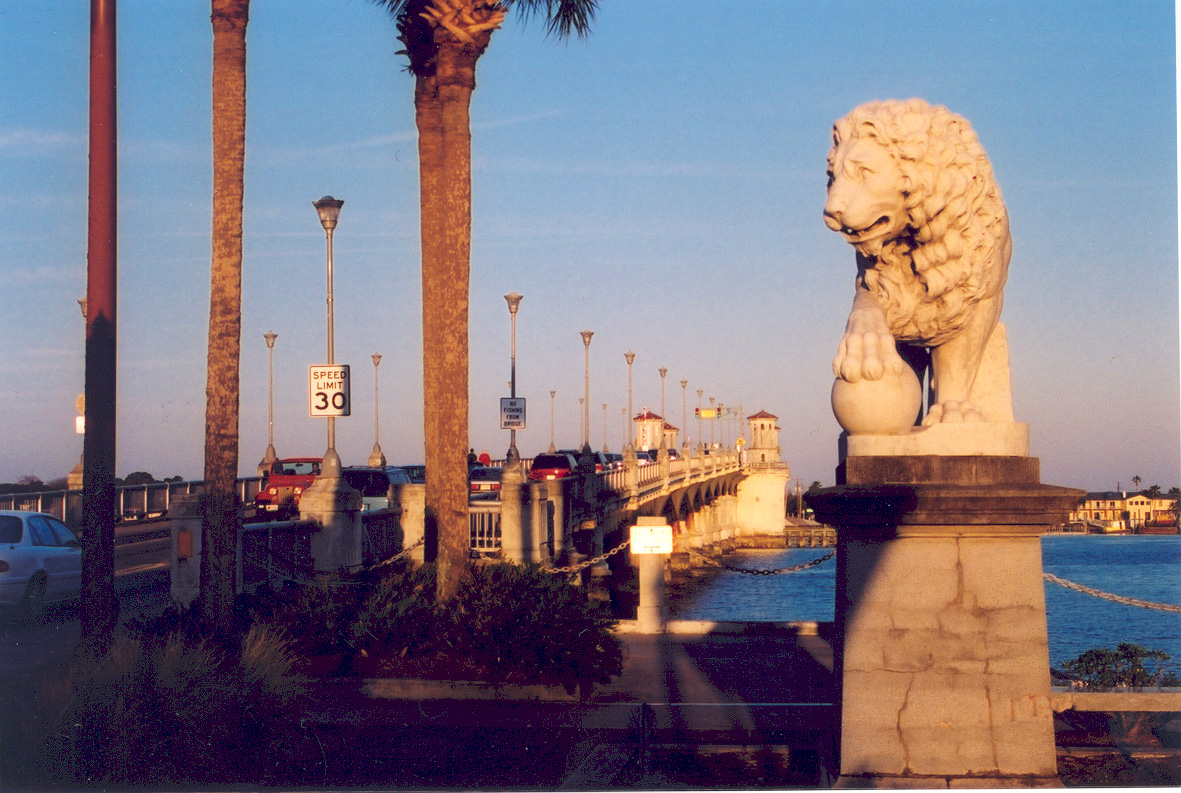
A Medici lion on the bridge, prior to renovation and relocation.

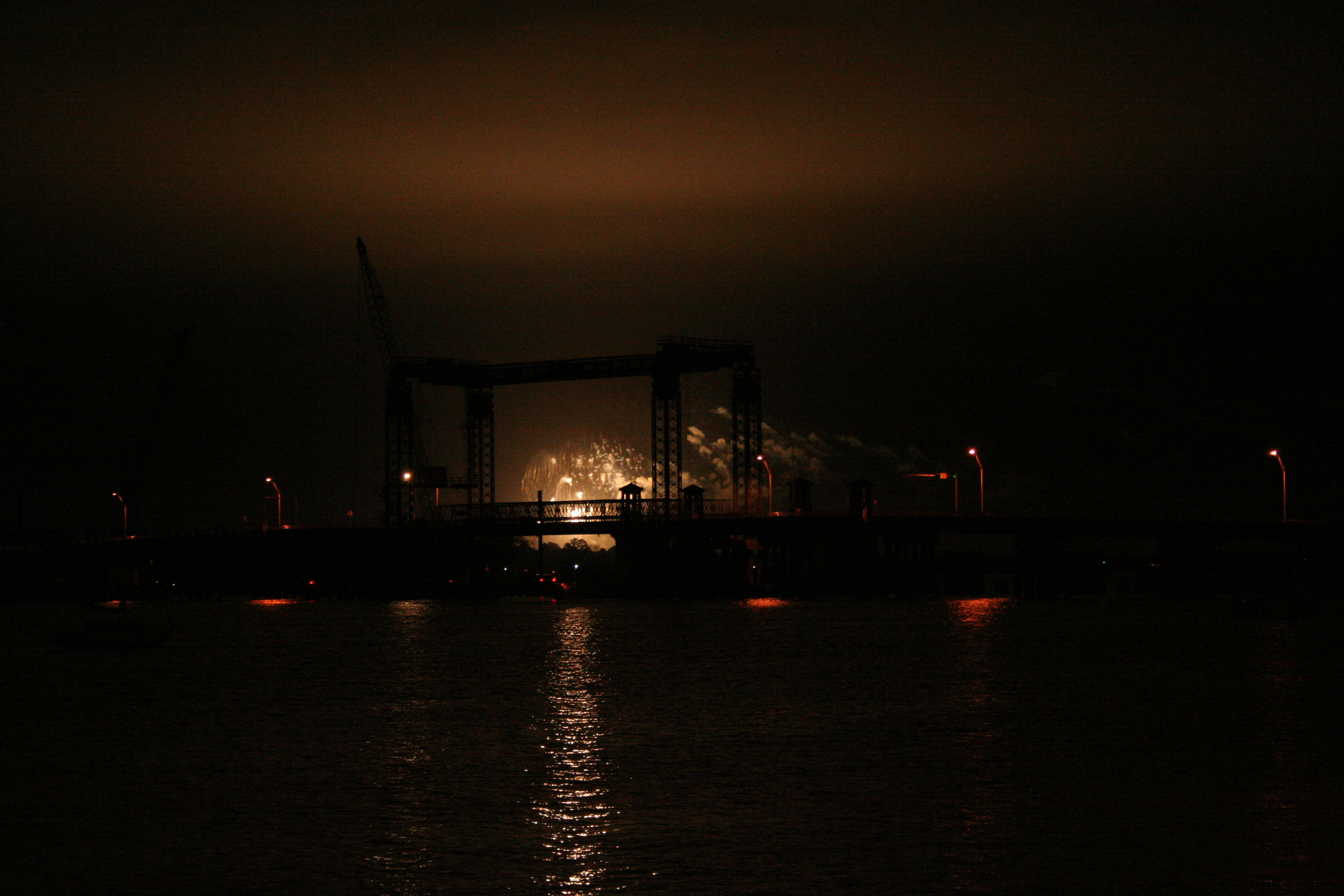
New Years fireworks at St Augustine seen through the Bridge of Lions, with the structure of the temporary bridge visible.

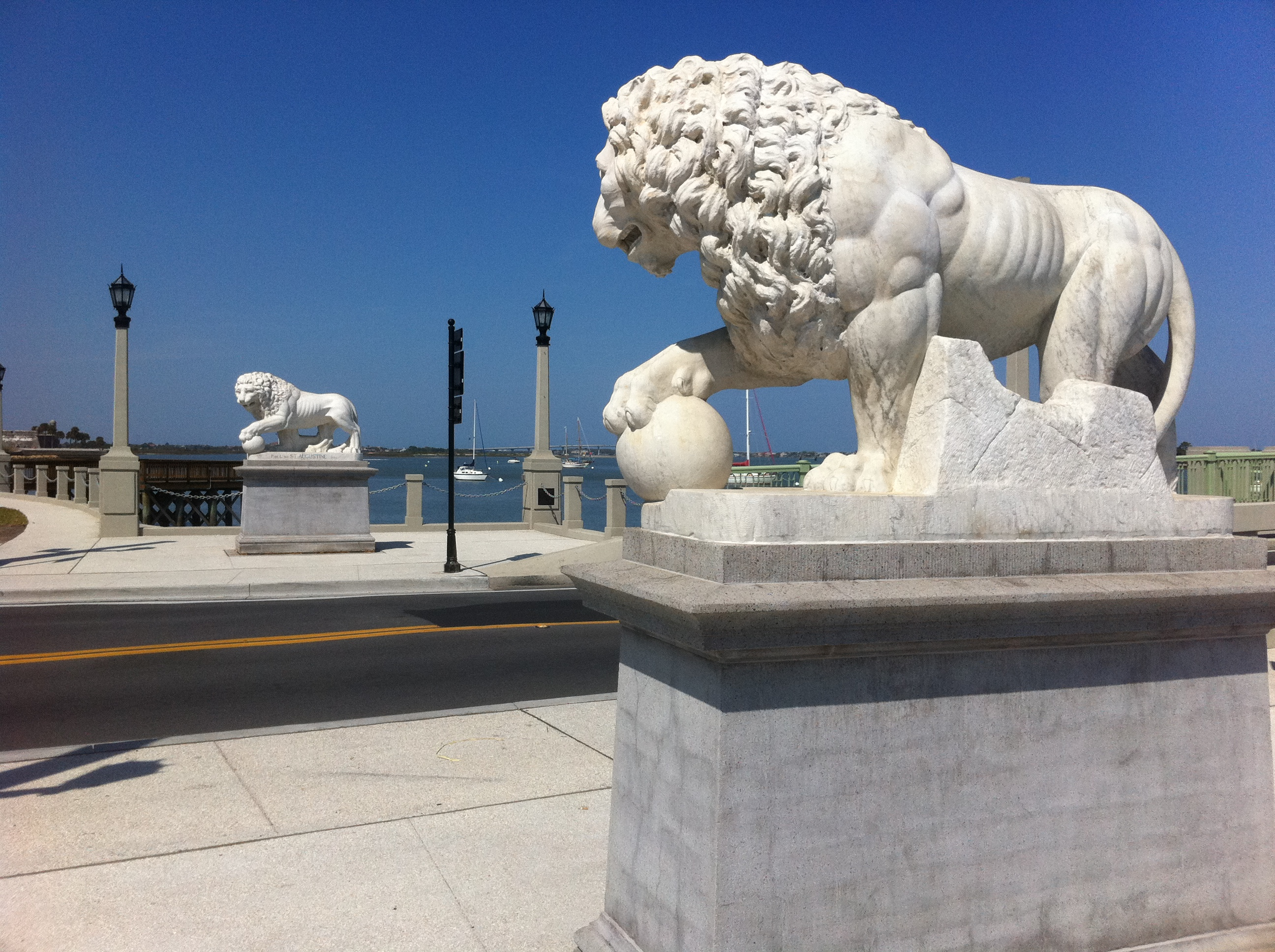
The lions restored to their original 1925 location, following completion of the bridge upgrade.

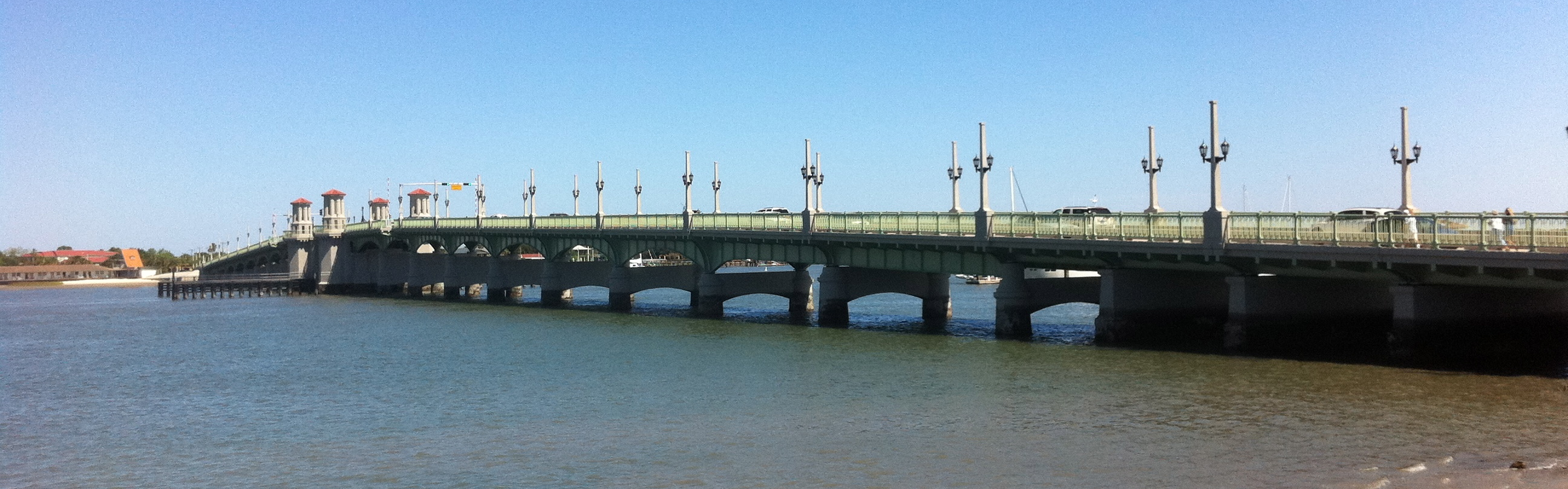
The bridge as seen from the west bank, in downtown Saint Augustine.

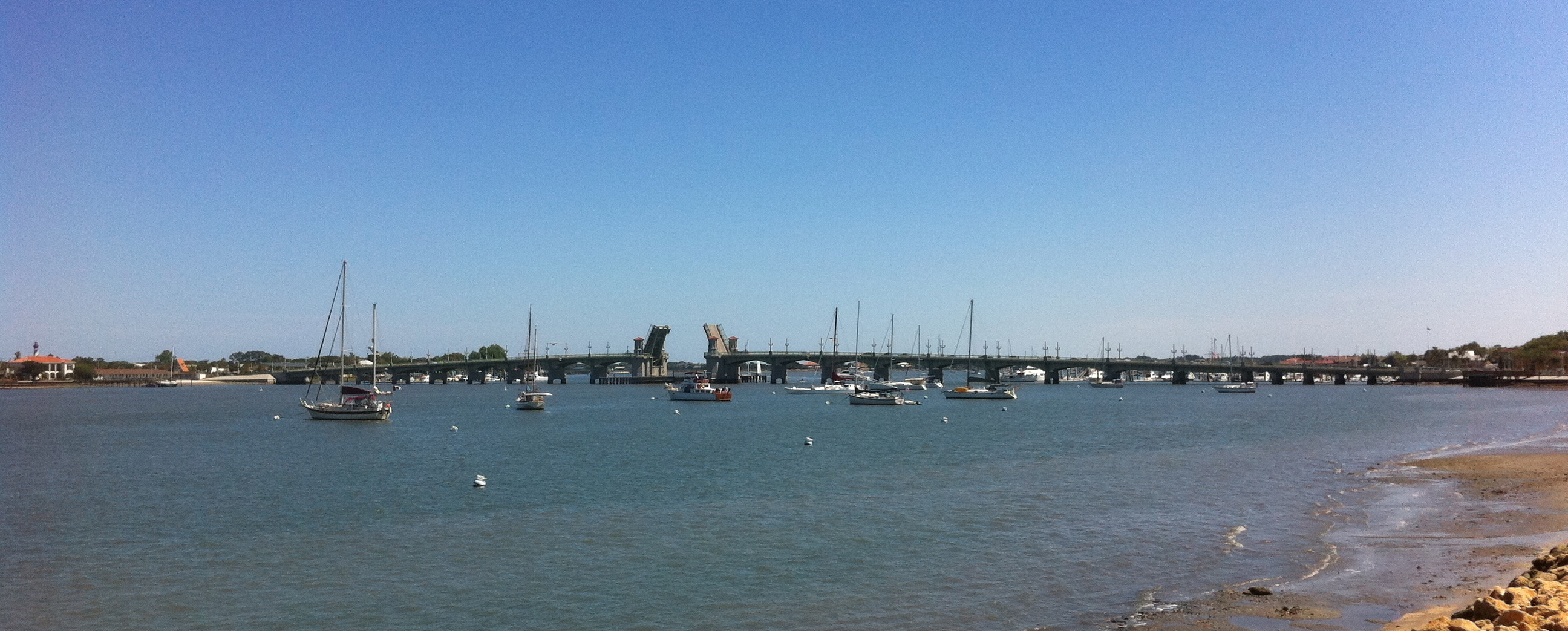
The bridge, with the center span open, as seen from the Castillo de San Marcos.
