= John D. Bailey =

American civic leader and philanthropist (1924–2018)

John Bailey
- Born: John Denver Bailey; May 10, 1924; Hartwell, Georgia, U.S.
- Died: August 17, 2018 (aged 94)
- Education: University of Georgia
- Occupations: Philanthropist, civic leader
- Known for: Mayor of St. Augustine, Florida, 1965–1967
- Awards: Order of Isabella the Catholic; Order of La Florida (1977)

John D. Bailey (May 10, 1924 – August 17, 2018) was a civic leader and philanthropist in, and Mayor of, St. Augustine, Florida from 1965 to 1967.

== Early life ==
John Denver Bailey was born in Hartwell, Georgia in 1924 to Denver and Jewell Bailey. In 1937, the family of four (John had a younger sister, Frances) moved to Athens, Georgia. Bailey attended Athens High School and then enrolled in the University of Georgia where he was a member of Sigma Chi fraternity. He paused his education to serve in the U.S. Air Force during World War II for three years and graduated from the University of Georgia in 1947 with a business degree. He joined the Insurance Company of North America and trained in Philadelphia, Pennsylvania. He married Margaret (Peggy) Bassing in Augusta, Georgia in 1948; they lived in Winter Park, Florida until 1954 when they moved to St. Augustine. Bailey and his wife had five children together.

== Career ==
When Bailey moved to St. Augustine he started working for the Thompson-Ryman Realty Company, which was later renamed the Thompson-Bailey Agency, and then the Thompson Bailey Baker Insurance Agency. Bailey was elected to the City Commission in 1963 and became Mayor of St. Augustine two years later. He presided over the city during St. Augustine's 400th anniversary celebrations in 1965. His term as mayor ended in 1967.

== Philanthropy ==
John D. Bailey is partly responsible for the founding of Flagler College. He was the trustee that persuaded Flagler's first president, William Proctor, to take the position. He served for more than forty years as a trustee on Flagler College's Board.

Bailey was a member of the board of trustees for the St. Augustine Historical Restoration and Preservation Commission (later to become the Historic St. Augustine Preservation Board) for almost twenty years (1969–1987). He held the offices of chairman, vice-chairman, and secretary-treasurer. He donated money to Commission preservation programs and to the preservation of the Hotel Ponce de Leon.

Bailey served on the Lightner Museum Board of Trustees for thirty years, the Florida School for the Deaf and Blind Foundation board, the Flagler Hospital board, and on Barnett Bank's board of directors for 28 years.

The Community Hospice Bailey Family Center for Caring is named for John D. Bailey. It opened in 2011 to give inpatient care to citizens in St. Augustine.

== Awards ==
The St. Augustine Junior Chamber of Commerce presented Bailey with the Man of the Year Distinguished Service Award in 1956.

The Spanish government awarded Bailey with the Order of Isabella the Catholic for his preservation work.

In 1977, Bailey was awarded the Order of La Florida for distinguished service to the city, contributing to St. Augustine's cultural and historic preservation. He was the third person to receive the award. He also received the Gus Craig Award, an award introduced by the Salvation Army in 1998.

== Personal life and legacy ==
John D. Bailey died in August 2018 at the age of 94.

There is a John and Peggy Bailey Scholarship Fund at Flagler College to honor the couple.
