= Fort Matanzas National Monument =

US fort that is a National Monument

- U.S. National Register of Historic Places
- U.S. National Monument
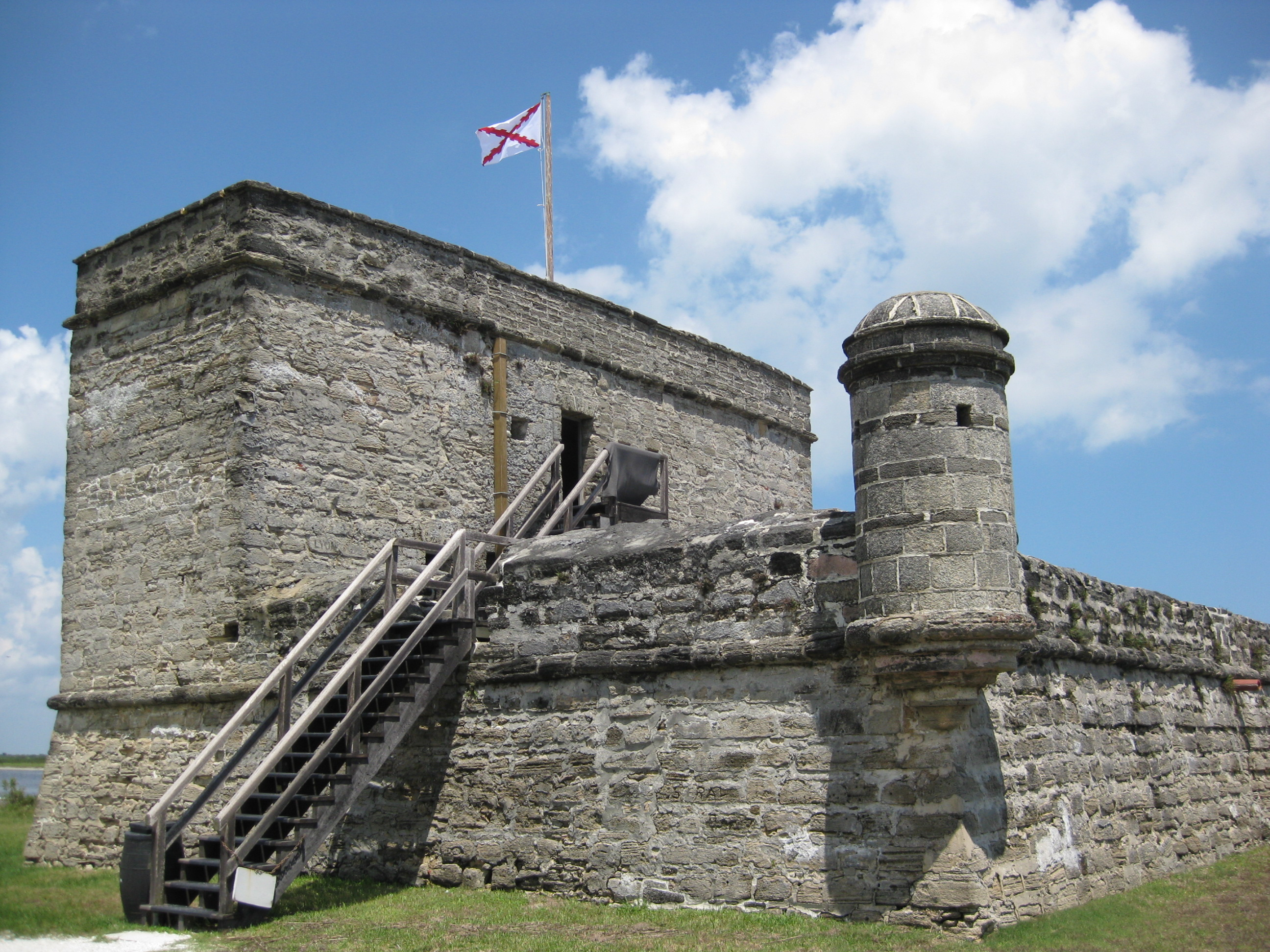
- View of fort's western and southern façades

- Location within Florida Location within the United States
- Interactive map of Fort Matanzas National Monument
- Location: St. Johns County, Florida, US
- Nearest city: St. Augustine, Florida
- Coordinates: 29°42′55″N 81°14′21″W
- Area: 227.76 acres (0.91 km²)
- Built: 1740-42
- Visitation: 653,152 (2025)
- Website: Fort Matanzas National Monument
- NRHP reference No.: 66000098

Significant dates
- Added to NRHP: October 15, 1966
- Designated NMON: October 15, 1924

Fort Matanzas National Monument (Spanish: Fuerte Matanzas) is the site where the Spanish built a fort. It was designated a United States national monument on October 15, 1924. The monument consists of a 1740 Spanish fort called Fort Matanzas, and about 100 acres (0.4 km^{2}) of salt marsh and barrier islands along the Matanzas River on the northern Atlantic coast of Florida. It is operated by the National Park Service in conjunction with the Castillo de San Marcos National Monument in the city of St. Augustine.

== History ==
Fort Matanzas was built by the Spanish in 1742 to guard Matanzas Inlet, the southern mouth of the Matanzas River, which could be used as a rear entrance to the city of St. Augustine. Such an approach avoided St. Augustine's primary defense system, centered at Castillo de San Marcos. In 1740, Gov. James Oglethorpe of Georgia used the inlet to blockade St. Augustine and launch a thirty-nine-day siege. St. Augustine endured the siege, but the episode convinced the Spanish that protecting the inlet was necessary to the security of the town. Under Gov. Manuel de Montiano's orders, construction of the fort began that year and was completed in 1742. Engineer Pedro Ruiz de Olano, who had worked on additions to the Castillo de San Marcos, designed the fortified observation tower. Convicts, slaves, and troops from Cuba were used as labor to erect the structure, which was sited on present-day Rattlesnake Island and had a commanding position over Matanzas Inlet.

The fort, known to the Spanish as Torre de Matanzas (Matanzas Tower), is a masonry structure made of coquina, a common shellstone building material in the area. The marshy terrain was stabilized by a foundation of pine pilings to accommodate a building 50 feet (15 m) long on each side with a 30-foot (9.1 m) high tower. The standard garrison of the fort was one officer in charge, four infantrymen, and two gunners, though more troops could be stationed if necessary. All soldiers at Fort Matanzas served on rotation from their regular duty in St. Augustine. Five cannon were placed at the fort—four six-pounders and one eighteen-pounder. All guns could reach the inlet, which at the time was less than half a mile away.

In 1742, as the fort was nearing completion, the British under Oglethorpe approached the inlet with twelve ships. Cannon fire drove off the scouting boats, and the warships left without engaging the fort. This brief encounter was the only time Fort Matanzas fired on an enemy. Spain lost control of Florida with the 1763 Treaty of Paris, and regained control with the 1783 Treaty of Paris. With the Spanish Empire falling apart, Spain spent little effort maintaining the fort after this time. When the United States took control of Florida in 1821, the fort had deteriorated to the point where soldiers could not live inside. The United States never used the fort and it became a ruin.

Fort Matanzas was named for the inlet, which acquired its name after the executions, or matanzas (Spanish: slaughters), on its north shore, of Jean Ribault and his band of Huguenot Frenchmen, the last of the Fort Caroline colonists, by the Spanish in 1565.

== Restoration and modern use ==
In 1916, the U.S Department of War began a major restoration of the badly deteriorated fort. By 1924, three vertical fissures in the wall were repaired and the structure was stabilized; in the same year, National Monument status was proclaimed. Fort Matanzas was transferred from the War Department to the National Park Service on August 10, 1933. As a historic area under the Park Service, the National Monument was listed on the National Register of Historic Places on October 15, 1966.

== Headquarters and Visitor Center ==
- Fort Matanzas NM Headquarters and Visitor Center
- U.S. National Register of Historic Places
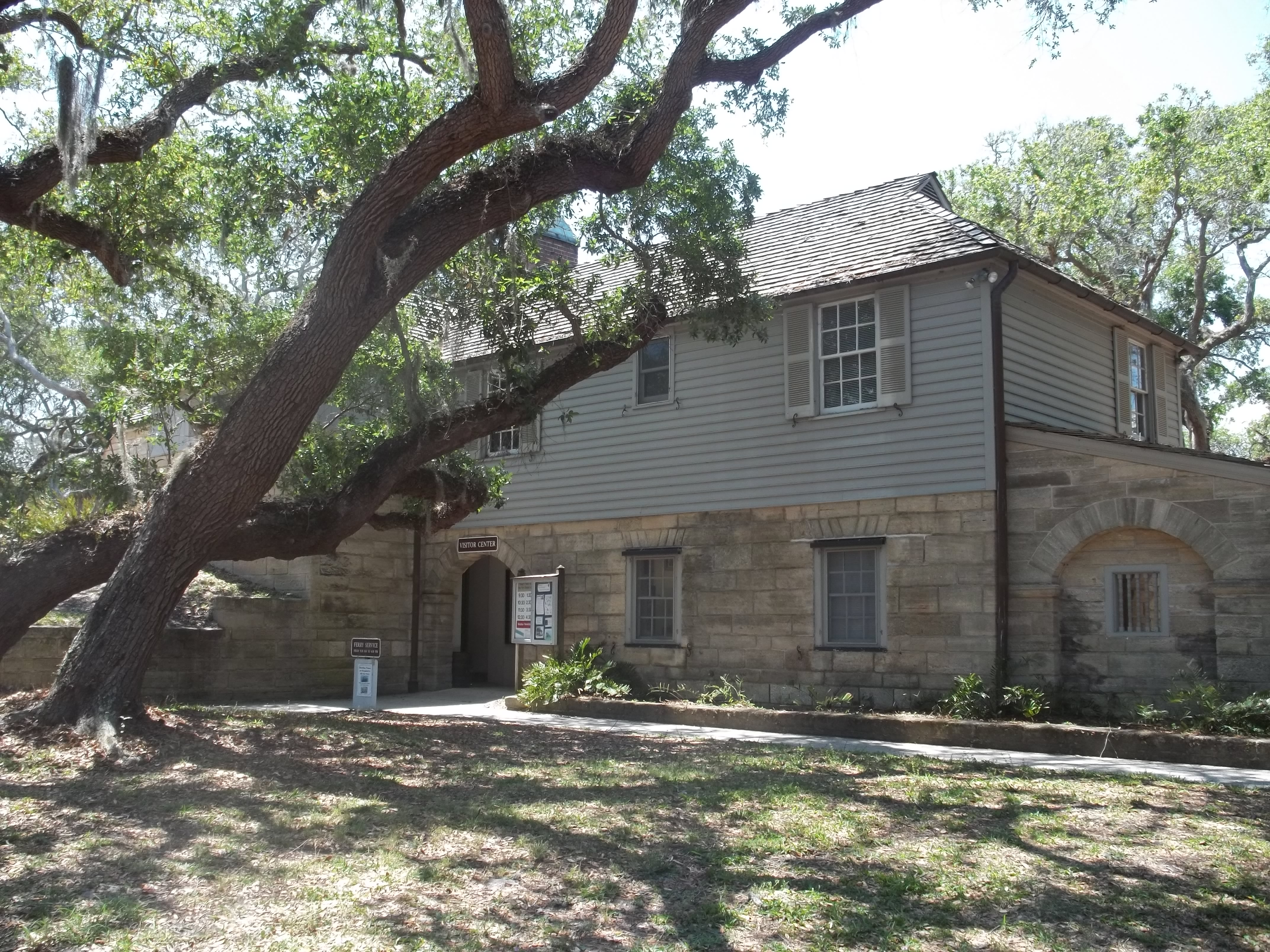
- Visitor center
- Location: 8635 A1A S., St. Augustine, Florida
- Built: 1936
- Architect: NPS Eastern Div. of Plans & Design
- Architectural style: NPS Rustic
- MPS: Florida's New Deal Resources MPS
- NRHP reference No.: 08001245
- Added to NRHP: December 31, 2008

The Fort Matanzas National Monument Headquarters and Visitor Center, located at 8635 A1A about 15 miles (24 km) south of St. Augustine, Florida, was built in 1936. Located on Anastasia Island, it services the Fort Matanzas National Monument, a five-minute boat ride away. It was designed by the National Park Service's Eastern Div. of Plans & Design in what is called National Park Service Rustic architectural style, and includes a museum. It was listed on the National Register of Historic Places in 2008. The listing included two contributing buildings and one contributing site on 17.3 acres (7.0 ha).

The main building is a two-story building with an arched walk-through breezeway that serves as the visitor center and includes a ranger residence as well. The walls of its first floor are made of coquina block masonry, and the second floor is wood framed with wood siding. It has a hipped roof.

The one-story second building, 50 feet (15 m) to the north, is also hip-roofed and has coquina walls. It is a utility building that now serves as a ranger office.

Visitors wait at the center to take a five-minute boat ride to the historic Fort Matanzas, which is located across Matanzas Inlet on Rattlesnake Island.

The buildings and the surrounding landscaping was designed by architects of the Eastern Division Branch of Plans and Design of the National Park Service.

Additional designed features include flagstone walkways and sidewalks, an exterior staircase, a retaining wall, parking areas and roads and curbs.

== Gallery ==
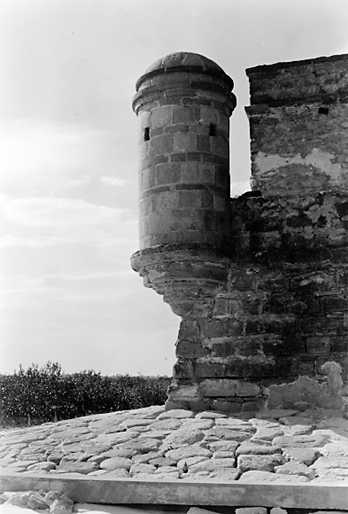
Sentry Box on barbazan, Fort Matanzas, 1937

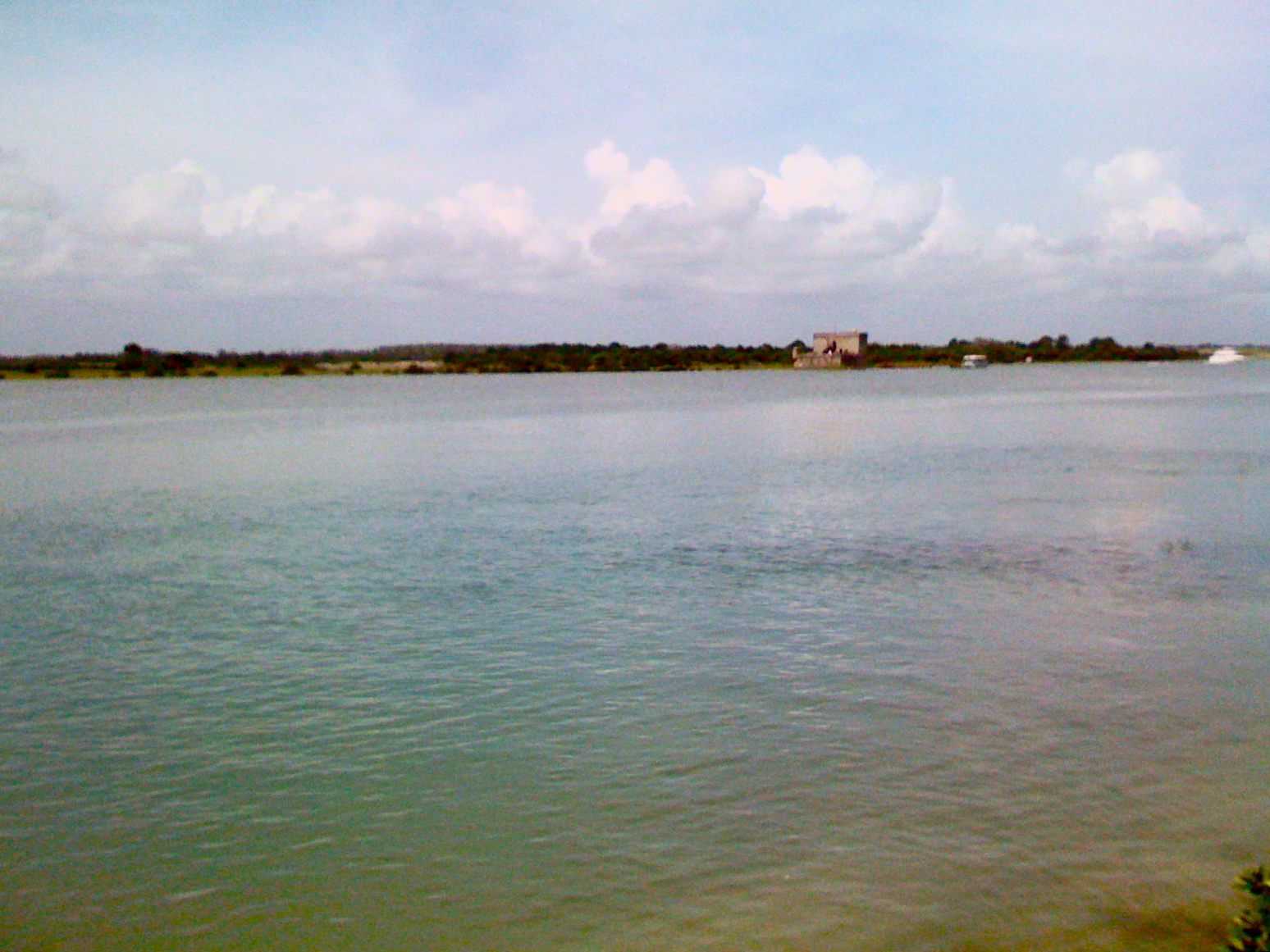
Fort Matanzas in the distance

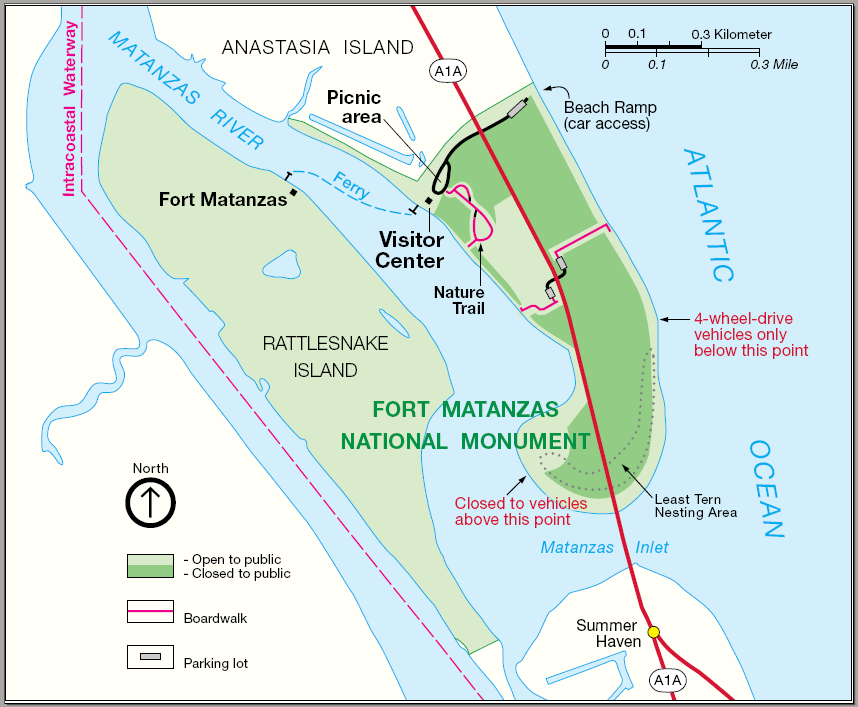
Map showing strategic location of Fort Matanzas

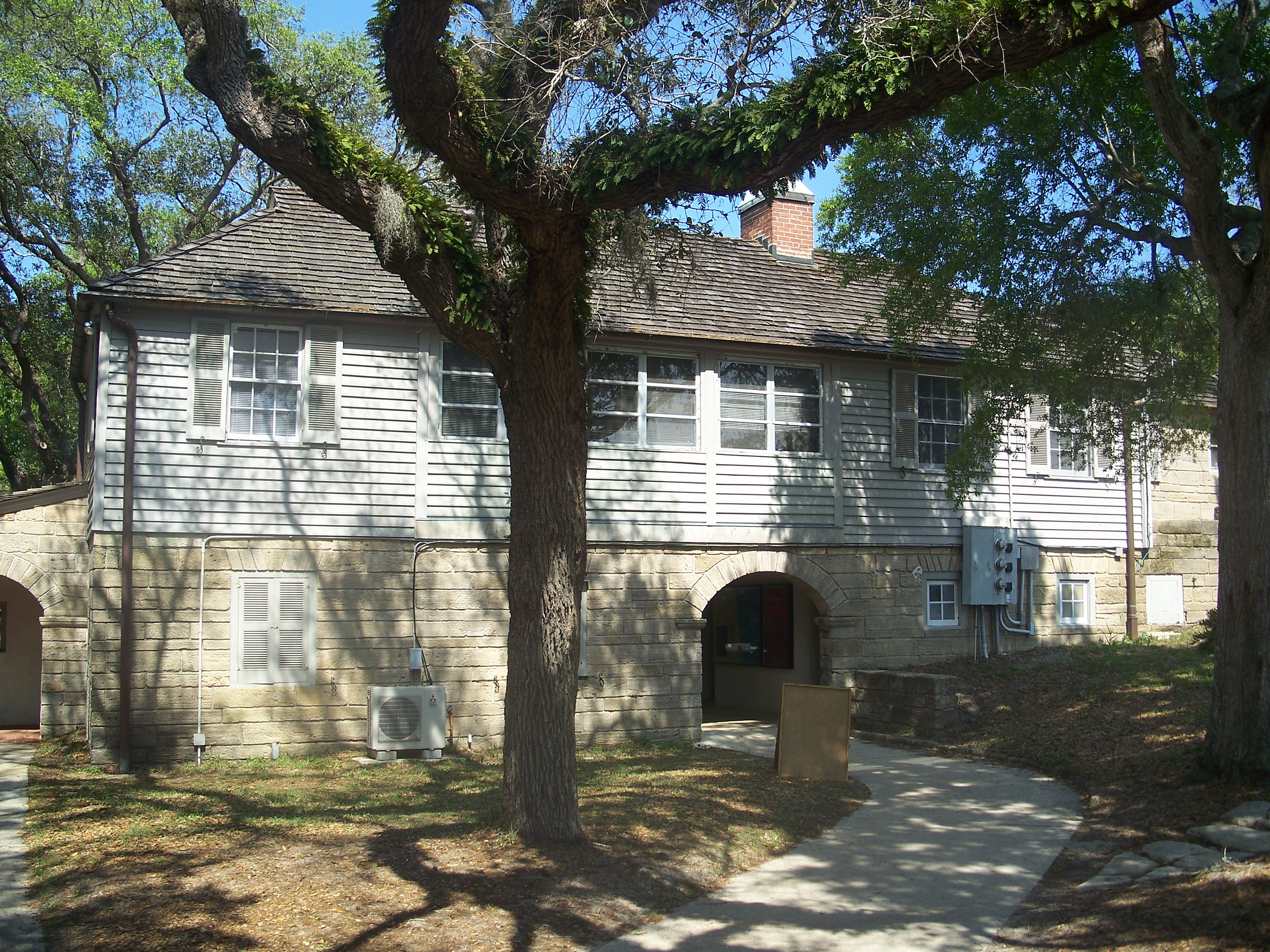
Visitor center

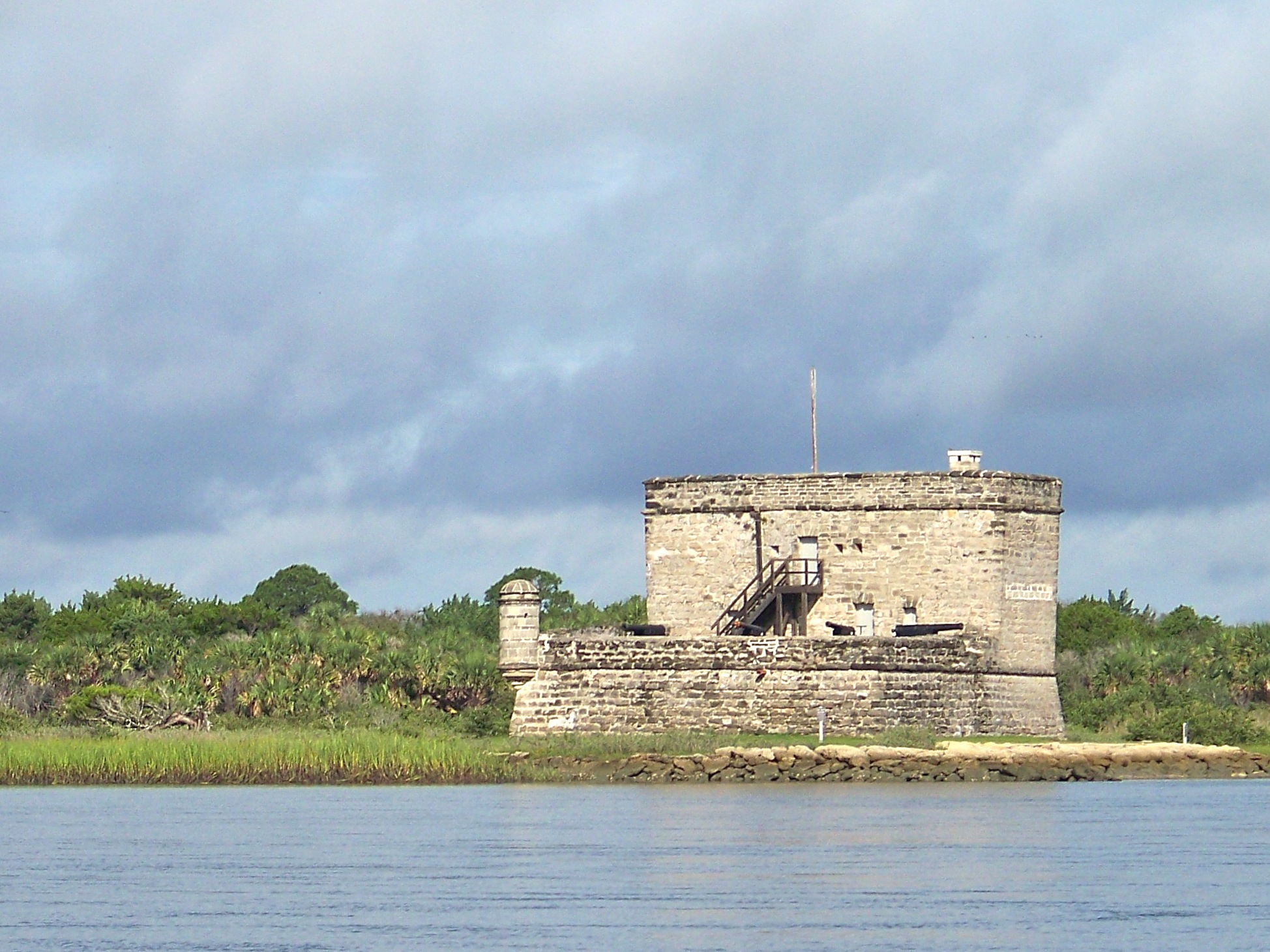
The fort seen from a ferry

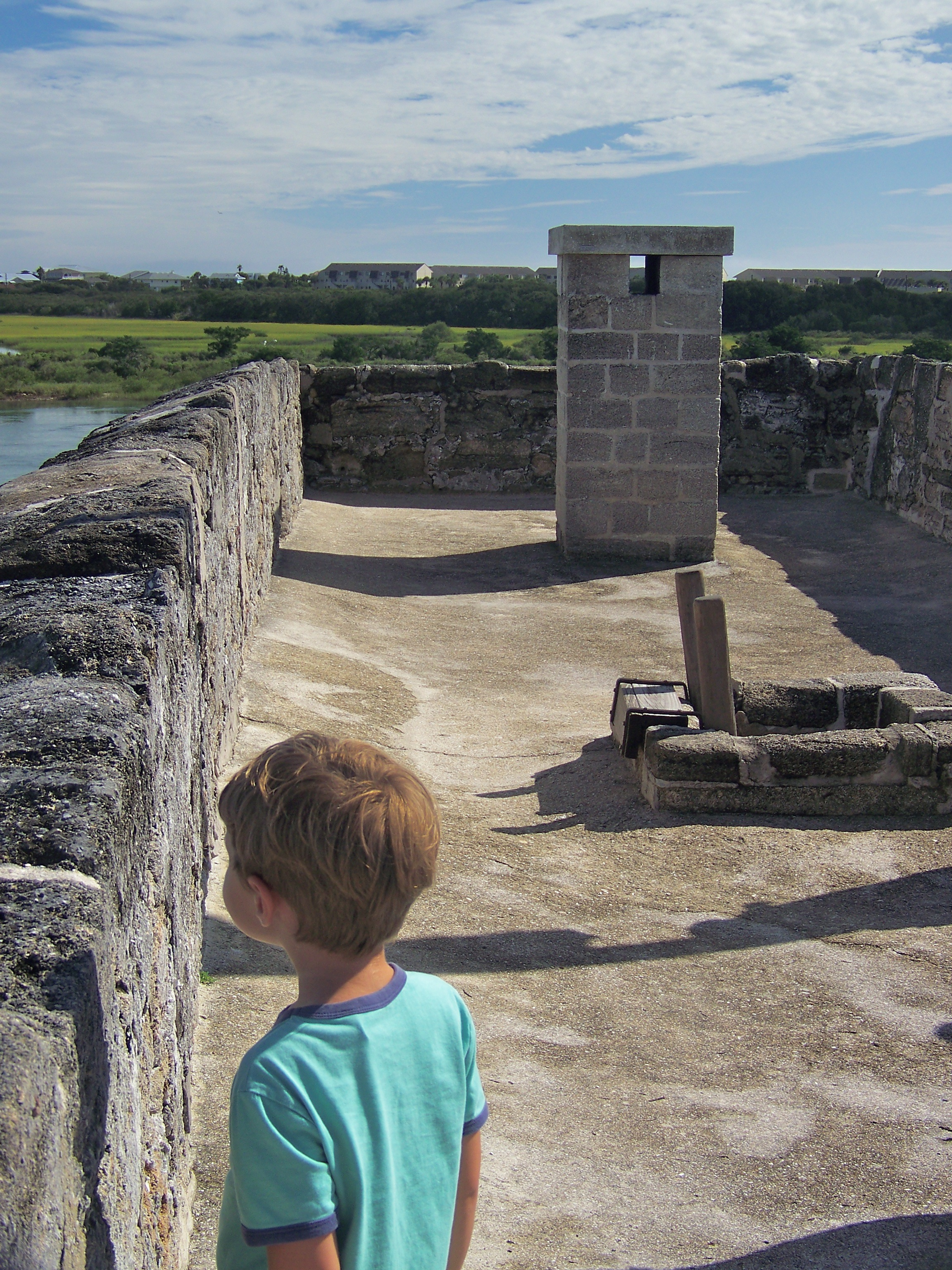
Roof

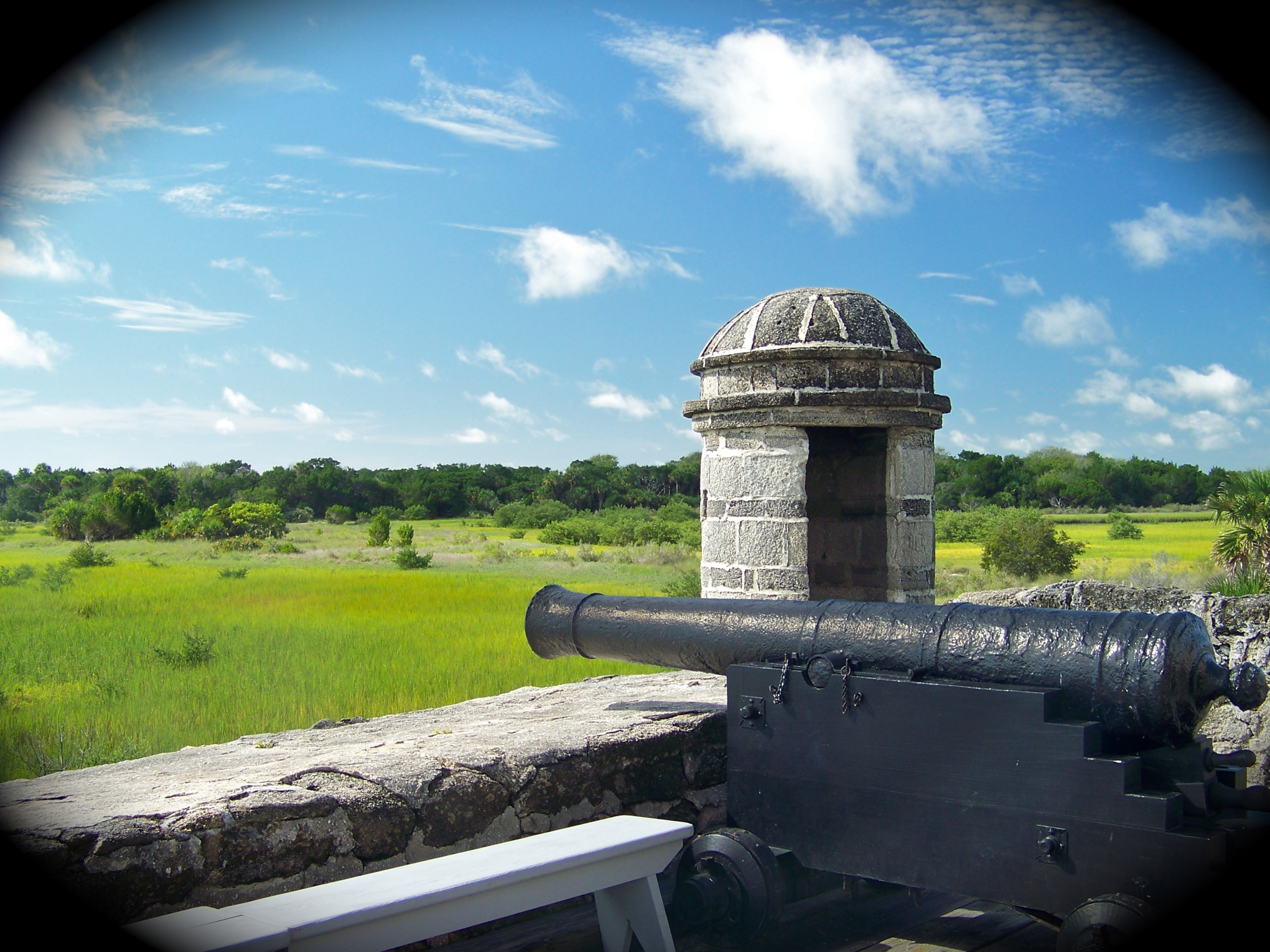
Gun deck, showing 3-pounder gun

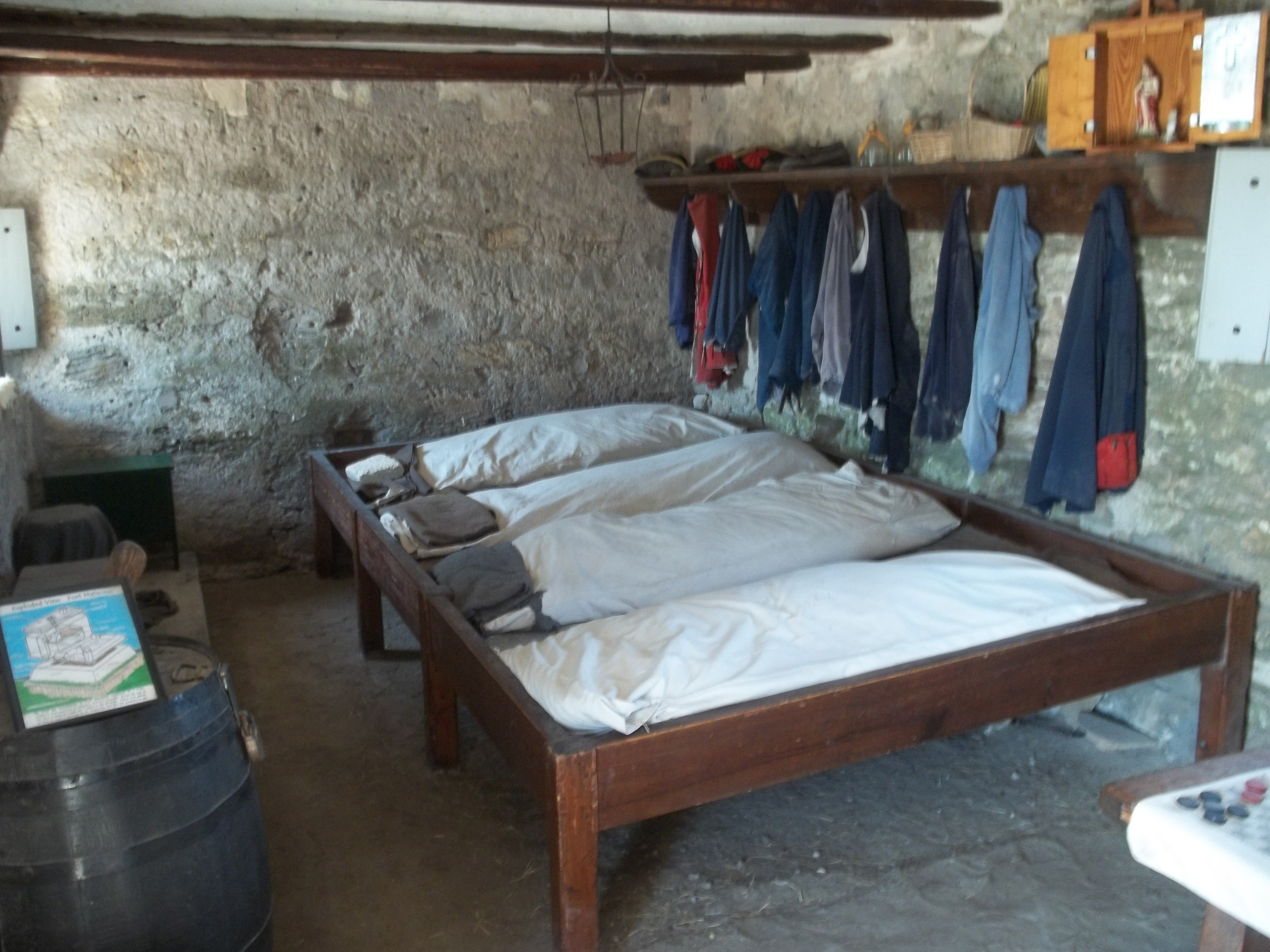
Interior

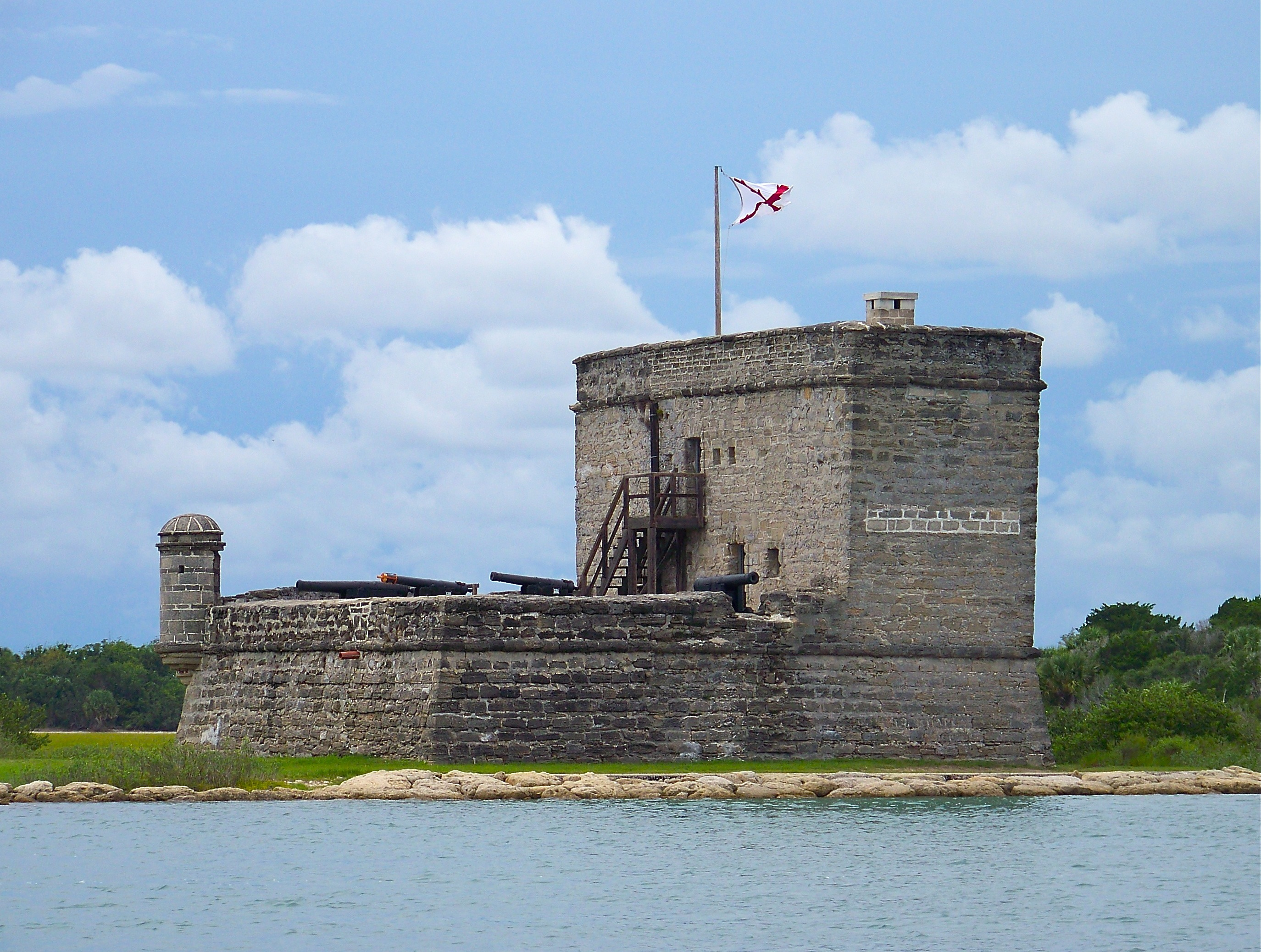
View from the Matanzas River

== See also ==
- Fort Matanzas National Monument Headquarters and Visitor Center
- List of national monuments of the United States
- For the etymology of "Matanzas" see Matanzas River.
- Hispanic Heritage Site
