= Henry W. McMillan =

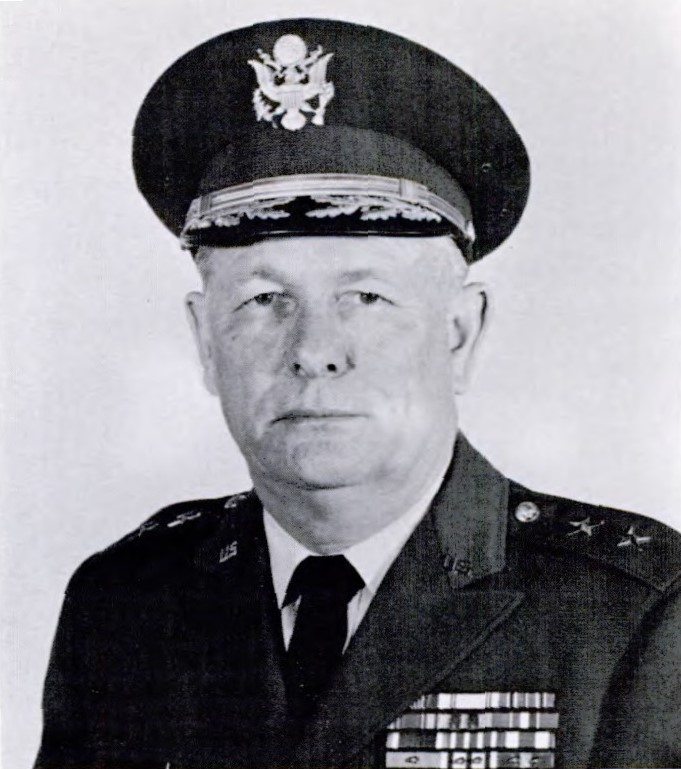
Maj. Gen. Henry W. McMillan

Major General Henry W. McMillan (August 12, 1911 - August 28, 1990) was an Adjutant General of Florida (1962–1975) and a longstanding service member in the Florida National Guard and the United States Army.

== Early life ==
Henry William McMillan Jr. was born in Osyka, Mississippi but moved to Tallahassee, Florida when he was fifteen. He had nine siblings. One of his sisters, Vernelle Tucker, was an early female executive for the Tallahassee Democrat paper. In adulthood, when he was not fulfilling his military duties, he worked with the Internal Revenue Service.

== Military career ==
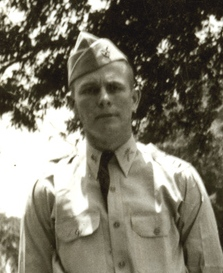
CPT Henry McMillan, Company M, 124th Infantry, Tallahassee, Florida National Guard

Henry W. McMillan enlisted in the Florida National Guard as a private in February 1929 at the age of seventeen and a half by claiming to be a year older. He became a second lieutenant in February 1934. He was mobilized in the army as a captain in November 1940 and promoted to major, lieutenant colonel, and colonel. He commanded an infantry company, a battalion, and the 124th Infantry Regiment throughout World War II. Towards the end of the war, he was the first Chief of U.S. Military Mission to the Republic of Paraguay. McMillan later resigned from the regular army and returned to Florida to reorganize the Florida National Guard. He became brigadier general in 1952 and major general in 1961. From 1961 to 1962, he commanded the 51st Infantry Division. McMillan served as Adjutant General of Florida from April 1962 - August 1975. In 1971 he answered a question on state versus federal compensation in the Annual Report of the Attorney General.

== Civic Service ==
While McMillan was Adjutant General, he was also president of the National Guard Association of the United States, Chairman of the Army Reserve Forces Policy Committee and president of the Adjutants General Association of the United States.

He was a member of the Rotary Club, a member of the Board of Directors of Barnett Bank of Anastasia Island, and of Marineland Incorporated of Florida. He served on the Historic St. Augustine Preservation Board (HSAPB) for almost twelve years in various capacities (chairman, vice-chairman, and secretary-treasurer). The HSAPB proclaimed McMillan a Distinguished Citizen on the occasion of his retirement.

== Awards and Medals ==
McMillan was honored with several military awards and decorations. He received the Distinguished Service Medal, the Legion of Merit, with Oak Leaf Cluster, the American Defense Service Medal, the WWII Victory Medal, the Order of Merit of the Republic of Paraguay, the Order of Isabel the Catholic from the Government of Spain, the Florida Cross, with Silver Cluster, and the Florida Distinguished Service Medal, among others. The Spanish government had recognized him for his involvement with the Historic St. Augustine Preservation Board and his contributions to restoring downtown St. Augustine, Florida. He was the first recipient of the City of St. Augustine's Order of La Florida in 1975.

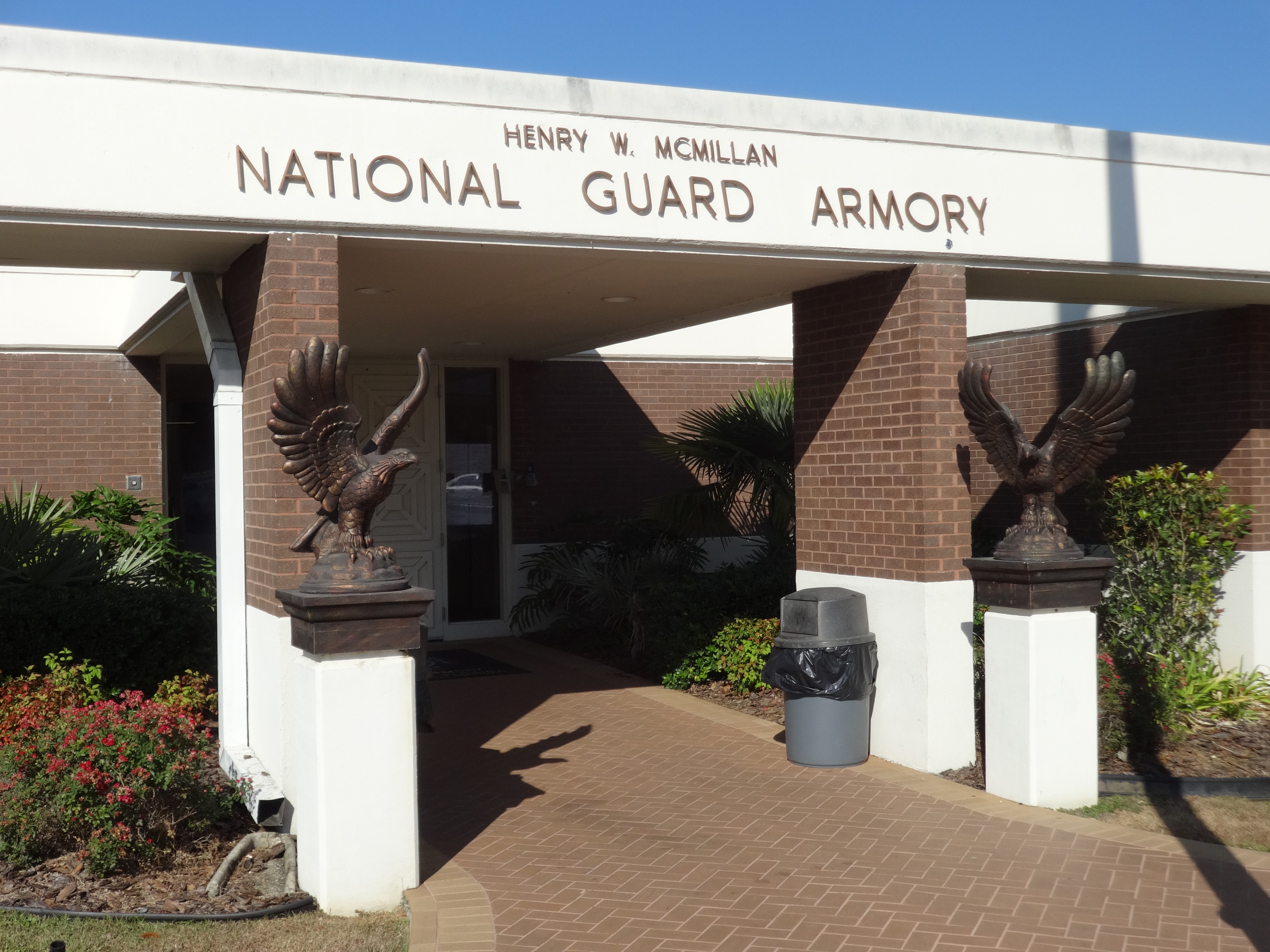
Henry W. McMillan National Guard Armory front with Eagles

== Family life and legacy ==
Henry W. McMillan married Louise Ford, of Columbus, Georgia in 1932. They had two daughters.

The National Guard Armory in Tallahassee was named for McMillan in 1976 upon his retirement. At that time, he was the longest serving member in history of the Florida National Guard. He died in Orlando in 1990 and is buried in Roselawn Cemetery in Tallahassee.
