= Order of La Florida =

Award conferred by St. Augustine, FL, US

- Awarded for: Outstanding contributions to Saint Augustine, Florida
- Country: Florida (United States of America)
- First award: 1975

The Order of La Florida is an award given by the City of St. Augustine, Florida to those who have rendered extraordinary services to the city.

== History ==
The award was established in 1975. Recipients must be at least fifty-five years old and there may not be any more than nine living recipients alive at a given time. Nominations come from a member of the city commission, which are then presented to the city manager. Whenever a recipient of the award dies, flags in the city are flown at half-staff.

== Recipients ==
In February 2018, Carl Halbirt became the twentieth and most recent recipient of the award. Halbirt spent twenty-seven years as the St. Augustine's city archaeologist. With the city he conducted more than 800 archaeological digs as part of St. Augustine's Archaeological Preservation Ordinance. Halbirt helped to give archaeology in the city more publicity. He was recognized by the Florida Trust for Historic Preservation and the Florida Anthropological Society for distinguished work. In 2015, the Advisory Council on Historic Preservation made Halbirt a Preservation America Steward.

In 2013, Dr. Robert B. Hayling became the first African American recipient of the Order of La Florida. Dr. Hayling had also received the city's other prestigious award, the de Avilés Award. Dr. Hayling was a lieutenant in the U.S. Air Force and then opened up an integrated dentistry practice in St. Augustine in 1960. He was head of the St. Augustine chapter of the Southern Christian Leadership Conference for almost a year and advised the local NAACP youth council. On the eve of the city's 400th anniversary celebrations, Dr. Hayling and Dr. Martin Luther King were among those who fought for civil rights in St. Augustine.

Past recipients of the Order of La Florida also include Henry W. McMillan, Herbert E. Wolfe, John D. Bailey, Albert C. Manucy, Lawrence Lewis Jr., Eleanor Philips Barnes, Xavier Lopez Pellicer, Clarissa Anderson Gibbs, Luis Rafael Arana, Eugene Lyon, Edward G. Mussallem, Jerome George Kass, Kenneth Beeson, William L. Proctor, Kathleen Deagan, Michael Gannon, Frank and Betty Usina, and Herbert L. Wiles. These figures were renowned in their field and often took part in restoration and preservation work in the city of St. Augustine.
