= Michael Gannon (historian) =

American historian, educator, and priest

Michael V. Gannon
- Born: April 28, 1927; Fort Sill, Oklahoma, U.S.
- Died: April 11, 2017 (aged 89); Gainesville, Florida, U.S.
- Education: Catholic University of America; University of Louvain; University of Florida
- Scientific career
- Fields: Spanish Colonial History
- Workplaces: University of Florida

Michael V. Gannon (April 28, 1927 – April 11, 2017) was a historian, educator, priest, and war correspondent.

== Early life and education ==
Michael Valentine Gannon was born into a military family in Fort Sill, Oklahoma. His family moved to Florida from Washington, D.C. after the death of his father in 1939.

Gannon attended high school at St. Joseph Academy in St. Augustine, Florida and received his bachelor's and master's degrees from Catholic University of America in Washington, D.C. He received a Ph.D. in history from the University of Florida in 1962. His dissertation was on Augustin Verot and the emergence of American Catholic social consciousness He trained for the priesthood at the American College of the University of Louvain in Louvain-la-Neuve, Belgium.

== Career ==
During high school and college, he worked various jobs, including radio hosting at WFOY-Radio, contributing as a sportswriter to the St. Augustine Record, and announcing shows at Marineland. He was ordained as a priest in 1959 in the Diocese of St. Augustine. He served as the chaplain of St. Augustine Catholic Church and Student Center in Gainesville, Florida. He also served as Director of Mission Nombre de Dios in St. Augustine, Florida from 1962 to 1967. It was during his directorship that St. Augustine's 400th anniversary was celebrated and the Great Cross commemorating the founding of the mission was installed.

Gannon became a faculty member in the history and religion departments at the University of Florida in 1967, beginning a teaching career of nearly 40 years. He resigned from the priesthood in 1976 and began teaching full-time at the University of Florida. Gannon directed the Institute for Early Contact Period Studies, which conducted research into the voyages of Christopher Columbus and early interactions between Europeans and Native Americans. He served as the Assistant Dean of the College of Liberal Arts and Sciences from 1976 to 1984, and as Associate Dean beginning in 1984. He was appointed Distinguished Service Professor of History by the university in 1992. He retired as a professor emeritus of history in 1998, but continued teaching until 2003.

Gannon was a prolific author of books and articles on American history, religion, and military history. In 1968, he was a war correspondent in Vietnam for the Catholic magazine America and the National Catholic News Service. His childhood in St. Augustine inspired a lifelong interest in Spanish colonial history, particularly in Florida. His first two books, Rebel Bishop (1964) and The Cross in the Sand (1965) explore Florida's early years of settlement. His 1990 book Operation Drumbeat discusses the history of Germany's early U-boats and became a national bestseller.

Gannon served as a member and chairman of several organizations on the local, state, and national level including the Historic St. Augustine Preservation Board from 1969 to 1997, serving as its chairman twice; from 1975 to 1980 and 1976–77. He was a member of the National Park Service Advisory Board for Southeastern States from 1972 to 1977 and served as its chairman from 1976 to 1977. He was appointed to the National de Soto Expedition Trail Commission by the U.S. Secretary of the Interior in 1992. Gannon was also a board member of Marineland of Florida and University of Florida Historic St. Augustine, Inc., a successor to the Preservation Board.

== Personal life and legacy ==
Gannon was well known for his study of Spanish colonial history. He received numerous awards and honors including Knight Commander of the Order of Isabel the Catholic, granted by King Juan Carlos I of Spain, Citizen of the Year from the City of Gainesville in 1972, and the Order of La Florida from the City of St. Augustine in 2007, the city's highest honor.

Gannon died on April 11, 2017. He was married to Genevieve Haugen, who survived him.

== Selected publications ==
- Pearl Harbor Betrayed: The True Story of a Man and a Nation under Attack Hardcover. Holt, 2001. ISBN 0805066985/ISBN 978-0805066982
- Black May. New York: HarperCollins. 1998. ISBN 0060178191. OCLC 39128840.
- Operation Drumbeat: The Dramatic True Story of Germany's First U-boat Attacks Along the American Coast in World War II. New York: Harper & Row. 1990. ISBN 0060161558. OCLC 21117890.
- Florida: A Short History. University Press of Florida, 2003. ISBN 0813026806/ISBN 978-0813026800
- The Cross in the Sand: The Early Catholic Church in Florida, 1513-1870. University Press of Florida, 1965. ISBN 0813007763/ISBN 978-0813007762
- Secret Missions. Harpercollins, 1994. ISBN 0060177330/ISBN 978-0060177331
- Rebel Bishop: Augustin Verot, Florida's Civil War Prelate. University Press of Florida, 1997. ISBN 0813015227/ISBN 978-0813015224
