= Lawrence Lewis Jr. =

American businessman and philanthropist (1918–1995)

- Born: July 6, 1918; Wilmington, North Carolina, United States
- Died: April 3, 1995 (aged 76); Richmond, Virginia, United States
- Education: Woodberry Forest School University of Virginia
- Occupations: Businessman; hotelier; philanthropist; benefactor
- Known for: Founding Flagler College
- Spouse: Janet Patton
- Children: 3

Lawrence Lewis Jr. (July 6, 1918 – April 3, 1995) was an American businessman, hotelier, philanthropist, and benefactor remembered for his role in founding Flagler College.

== Early life and education ==
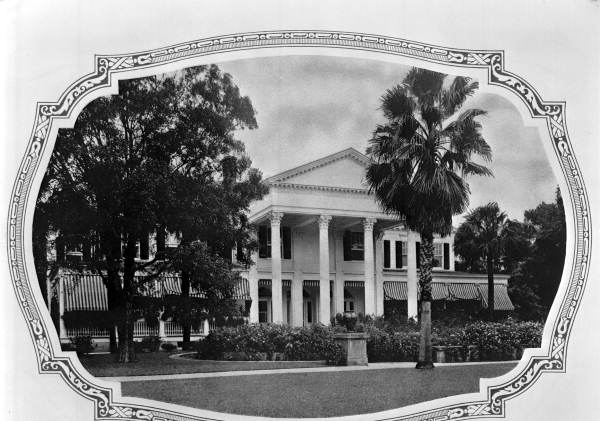
Kirkside, St. Augustine

Lawrence Lewis Jr. was born on July 6, 1918, in Wilmington, North Carolina, to Louise Wise Lewis Francis and Lawrence Lewis Sr. When Lewis was an infant, his family moved to St. Augustine, Florida, and lived at Kirkside, Henry Flagler’s former home, which Lewis’s mother had inherited as Flagler’s niece.

Lewis attended Woodberry Forest School in Orange, Virginia, and the University of Virginia in Charlottesville. He studied architecture and was a member of Phi Kappa Sigma fraternity and secret society Eli Banana. He withdrew from college in 1941 and enlisted in the U.S. Army during World War II. He was initially stationed at Fort Hood in Texas and actively served in Italy where he was wounded. He received three battle stars and two Purple Hearts for his service.

== Career ==
After the war, Lewis followed in his great-uncle’s footsteps, opening his own set of hotels. He owned Club Peace and Plenty in Exuma, The Bahamas as well as the Runner Hotel in Wrightsville Beach, North Carolina. He served as the executive Vice President and Director of Flagler Systems, Inc., the product of a merger between the Florida East Coast Hotel Company and the Model Land Company. Flagler Systems owned and operated several hotels in Florida, including the Hotel Ponce de Leon (often called The Ponce) and the Ponce de Leon Motor Lodge in St. Augustine and the Breakers in Palm Beach.

== Flagler College ==
In 1968 administrators at Mount Ida College in Newton, Massachusetts, approached Lewis about buying the Hotel Ponce de Leon to open a women’s college in St. Augustine; Lewis agreed to the sale on the condition that the school be called Flagler College. The first iteration of the college failed, but was reorganized with Lewis's assistance as a co-ed college in 1971. In 2018, Flagler College celebrated its 50th anniversary.

Lewis and his sister Mary Lily Flagler "Molly" Lewis Wiley funded much of the renovation cost to make the Ponce suitable for collegiate life, totaling close to $14 million, with their own money. Additional significant funding was provided through the Flagler Foundation and the William R. Kenan, Jr. Charitable Trust.

The Lewis family continued to provide financial support to the college after his initial gift. Their donations funded the renovation of nearby houses connected historically to the Hotel Ponce de Leon. They became administrative offices. Lewis funded construction of the college's gymnasium, auditorium, tennis center, a men's residence hall, and the William L. Proctor Library, as well as a number of student scholarships and endowments. He also served as the Chairman of the college's Board of Trustees for twenty years.

== Personal life and legacy ==
Lewis was married to Janet Patton for 55 years, and they had three daughters: Louise, Janet, and Kenan. Two of his grandsons graduated from Flagler College.

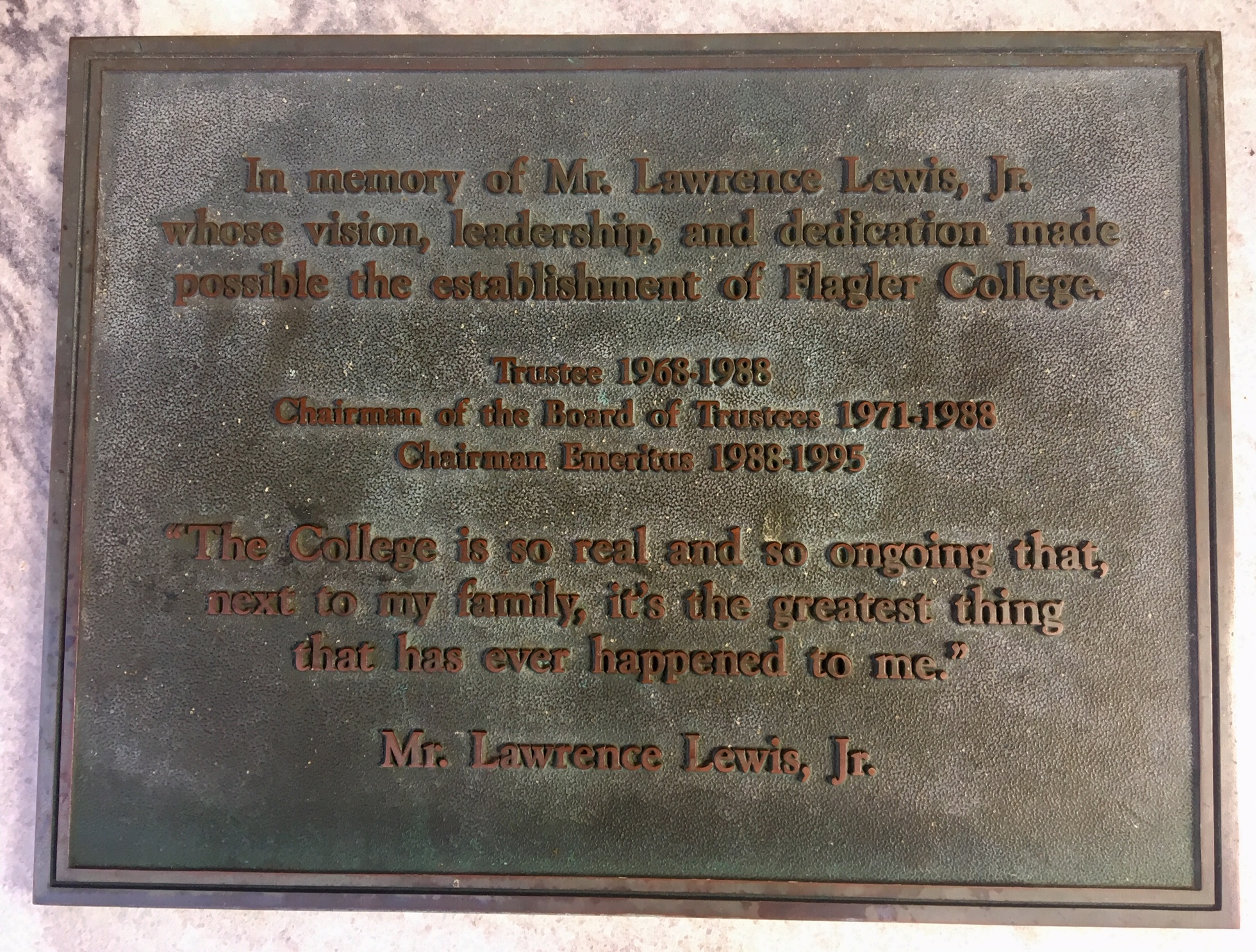
Lawrence Lewis Memorial Plaque

Lewis served as a trustee on a number of boards including the Historic St. Augustine Preservation Board, the St. Augustine Foundation, Inc., the Florida Publishing Company, the Exchange Bank of St. Augustine, the Virginia Historical Society, the Virginia Museum, the Richmond Memorial Hospital, United Virginia Bank, Piedmont Airlines, Florida Independent College Fund, St. Catherine's School, Woodberry Forest, the Board of Visitors at the University of Virginia, the Colgate Darden Graduate Business School, and the UVA Endowment Fund.

Lewis was the recipient of many honors throughout his lifetime, including honorary degrees from Hampden-Sydney College, the University of Florida, and Flagler College. He also received the Order of La Florida from the City of St. Augustine, the Florida Distinguished Service Medal, the National Trust Preservation Award, and an honorary membership in the American Institute of Architects.

Lewis died on April 3, 1995, at his home in Richmond, Virginia, at the age of 76. He was honored posthumously by the State of Florida as a Great Floridian in 2000. Lewis Auditorium and Lewis House at Flagler College are named in his honor. The Lewis Chair of Architecture at the University of Virginia and the Lawrence Lewis Jr. Park in Charles City, Virginia, also bear his name.
