= Lawrence Lewis (cricketer) =

Australian cricketer

Personal information
- Born: 24 May 1889; Cherry Gardens, South Australia
- Died: 2 September 1947 (aged 58); Prospect, Australia
- Source: Cricinfo, 12 August 2020

Lawrence Lewis (24 May 1889 – 2 September 1947) was an Australian cricketer. He played in two first-class matches for South Australia in 1926/27.

== See also ==
- List of South Australian representative cricketers
