= Port of St. Augustine =

Small port in northeastern Florida

St. Augustine
- Click on the map for a fullscreen view
- St. Augustine (the United States)

Location
- Country: United States
- Location: Florida
- Coordinates: 29°54′N 81°19′W
- UN/LOCODE: USUST

Statistics
- Website www.staugustineport.com

The Port of St. Augustine is a port facility in the city of St. Augustine, Florida.

== History ==
The port of St. Augustine was used as a naval facility for from late 18th-century onward. As the nation's oldest seaport is the safest place for maritime activities.

== Facilities ==
The port provides services like temporary and long term boaters in Northeast Florida.
