= Andrew Anderson (St. Augustine, Florida) =

American physician

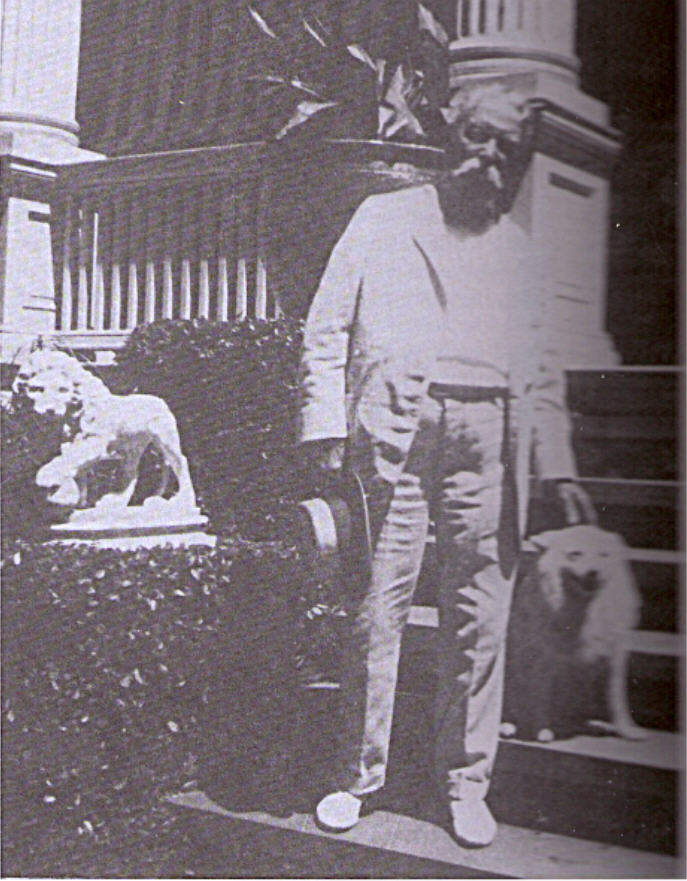
Andrew Anderson II at Markland: miniature Medici lion on left

Andrew Anderson II (March 13, 1839 in St. Augustine, Florida – December 2, 1924 in St. Augustine) was an American physician, philanthropist, mayor and benefactor of St. Augustine, Florida. Anderson commissioned multiple works of art to adorn a variety of public spaces in the city of St. Augustine, including the two Medici lion statues placed at the approach to the Bridge of Lions.

Anderson was the son of New York physician Dr. Andrew Anderson I, an 1813 graduate of the New York College of Physicians and Surgeons. His father arrived in St. Augustine in 1829 aboard the schooner General Jackson, along with his mother Mary and two sisters, Hannah and Emily. Within a few years the elder Anderson had become a pillar of the community. He was elected head of the local temperance society in 1830, St. Augustine alderman in 1833 and 1834, justice of the peace and elder of the Presbyterian Church in 1839.

Andrew Anderson I's first wife Mary Anderson died on September 8, 1837. In 1838 he married Clarissa Cochrane Fairbanks, a widow from New Hampshire. Their son Andrew Anderson II was born in 1839. In the same year his father laid the cornerstone for what would eventually become the Markland Mansion on the plantation he owned on land between the San Sebastian River and Maria Sanchez Creek. Soon after beginning construction on Markland his father perished in a yellow fever outbreak which had struck St. Augustine.

== Education - post-Civil War ==
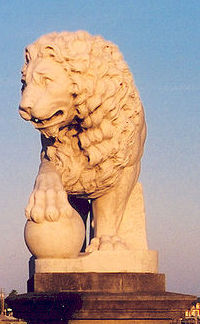
Marble lion, one of a pair commissioned by Dr. Andrew Anderson for Bridge of Lions

Anderson and his family moved into a scaled back version of Markland in 1841. After attending receiving his preliminary schooling in St. Augustine, Anderson attended the Phillips Academy in Andover, Massachusetts between 1853 - 1854 then switched to a private school in Paris, France.

Upon returning to the United States he entered Princeton University, then during the Civil War he escaped from Florida and went to New York City, where he entered medical school at Columbia University College of Physicians and Surgeons in New York City.

He didn't serve in the military in the American Civil War, but did pay for a substitute in the St. Augustine Blues (Third Florida Inf., Co. B) as was accepted custom at the time. He also volunteered his services to the Union as a physician treating the wounded at the Second Battle of Fredericksburg. In 1865, after the South's capitulation he interned at St. Luke's Hospital in New York City.

After returning to St. Augustine, Anderson immersed himself in the civic affairs of the city including sitting on the board that created the Peabody Free School, the local Republican Party Secretary, alderman on the St. Augustine City Council and St. Johns County Commissioner as well as serving in the board of the Buckingham Smith Benevolent Association. In 1886, he was elected mayor of St. Augustine.

Anderson would be a principal partner along with Frank H. Palmer and Edward E. Vaill in the construction of the St. Augustine Hotel, the most opulent hotel in the city before the construction of the San Marco Hotel. In 1880 he entertained President Ulysses S. Grant, whose sister Julia was married to the post commander of St. Francis Barracks, upon Grant's visit to St. Augustine.

== Henry Flagler ==
In 1885, Anderson sold his land east of Markland to Henry Flagler as was the land of Anderson's two half-sisters for the construction of two hotels, the Ponce de León Hotel and the Alcazar Hotel. For a period of time Anderson (who had rented out Markland after his mother's death in 1881) lived in a third Flagler hotel, the Cordova, which Flagler purchased from Franklin W. Smith. During this time he maintained a small medical practice at the Alcazar.

== Alica Hospital ==
In May 1888, the St. Augustine Hospital Association to oversee Alicia Hospital located on Marine Street in a building deeded to the association by Henry Flagler. Anderson worked at the hospital as a physician, and served as chairman of the board of trustees. He remained a trustee until his death.

== Personal ==
Anderson married Mary Elizabeth Smethurst, a woman 24 years his junior, at Trinity Episcopal Church, St. Augustine on January 29, 1895. The best man was his cousin William Harriman of New York, and Henry Flagler attended the wedding with his wife. Anderson also invited a large number of African-Americans, which went against the social customs of the time.

The Andersons had two children, Clarissa and Andrew. They hired New Jersey architect Charles Alling Gifford to vastly enlarge and remodel Markland, 1899-1901. Mrs. Anderson died in Nova Scotia on September 12, 1912, in Chester, Nova Scotia where they owned a vacation home. Anderson died on December 2, 1924, and is buried beside his wife at Evergreen Cemetery in St. Augustine.

== Civic contributions ==
- $50,000 donation to the University of Florida for a large pipe organ, designed by William Zeuch of the Skinner Organ Co., Boston, and dedicated in 1925.
- World War I Flag Pole with engraved bronze base (by Charles Adrian Pillars 1870-1937), dedicated on November 11, 1921. Located on traffic circle at the approach the Bridge of Lions.
- Life size statue of Ponce de León on November 11, 1923, located on traffic circle opposite World War I Flag Pole.
- Marble lions at the base of the Bridge of Lions (carved by F. Romanelli) one a replica of a Roman original the other a copy of one carved by Flaminio Vacca to copy the Roman original except with the opposite paw on the ball, both are on display at Loggia dei Lanzi in Florence, Italy.
