= Albert Manucy =

American historian (1910–1997)

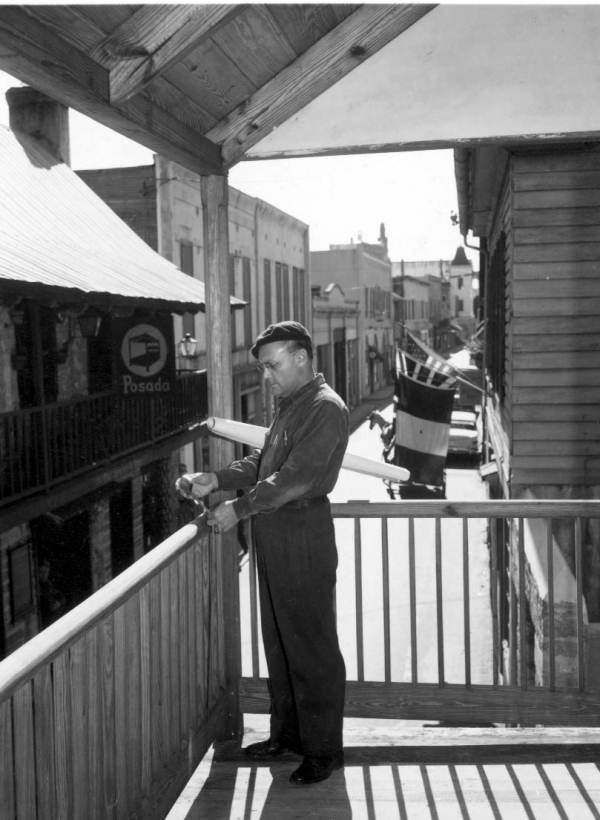
Albert Manucy at the Arrivas House, ca. 1963

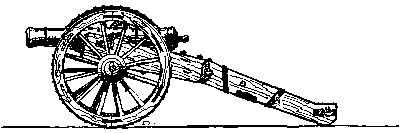
American six pounder field piece (1775) by Albert Manucy

Albert C. Manucy (February 20, 1910 – March 2, 1997) was an American author, historian and a Fulbright Scholar who specialized in Spanish Colonial Florida and the architecture of St. Augustine, Florida.

== Early life and education ==
Albert Clement Manucy was born in St. Augustine on February 20, 1910. His family were of Minorcan descent; his ancestor Josef Manucy was one of the indentured laborers at Andrew Turnbull's colony in New Smyrna, Florida before fleeing to sanctuary in St. Augustine with the other colony settlers in 1779. He attended Ketterlinus High School and graduated in 1928 and attended the University of Florida, where he received a bachelor's degree in education in 1932 and a master's degree in literature in 1934.

== National Park Service ==
After graduation, Manucy worked for the National Park Service. He first worked on a WPA research project on Fort Jefferson National Monument in Key West, Florida. When money for that project ran out, he returned to St. Augustine to write Seeing St. Augustine, a guidebook sponsored by the Federal Writers' Project. Manucy eventually became a full-time Park Service staff member in 1938. He was one of the first historians of the National Park Service and would become an authority on the history of Spanish Florida; in particular, the Castillo de San Marcos in his hometown. He traveled around the United States, South America, and Europe to study and research St. Augustine. He published his first book, The Houses of St. Augustine, 1566-1821 in 1962.

In 1966, he became the curator for the Southeast Regional Office of the National Park Service in Richmond, Virginia. He retired in 1971 and moved back to St. Augustine in 1975, where he remained until his death. In all, Manucy worked for the National Park Service for 33 years. He wrote on many subjects, including two books on St. Augustine.

== Architecture and Historic Preservation ==
As a child growing up in St. Augustine, Manucy witnessed the destruction of many local historic houses over the course of his residence there, which inspired him to learn more about architecture. In 1937, Manucy spent time in Washington, DC at the Library of Congress collecting research on St. Augustine for the St. Augustine Historical Program, sponsored by the Carnegie Foundation. This was the beginning of an effort to preserve St. Augustine's historic buildings. This would eventually lead to the formation of the St. Augustine Historical Preservation and Restoration Commission, later known as the Historic St. Augustine Preservation Board.

Manucy was awarded a Fulbright scholarship to study the folk architecture of Spain in 1962. He was interested in the influence that it had on the architecture and town plan of St. Augustine. He took a leave of absence from the National Park Service and spent a year traveling around Spain.

While conducting research for his book Sixteenth Century St. Augustine: The People and Their Homes, Manucy discovered that from 1566 to 1572, the town of St. Augustine was actually situated on Anastasia Island, across Matanzas Bay from its current location. This was confirmed by colleague and historian Eugene Lyon in the 1990s.

Upon his retirement and return to St. Augustine in 1975, Manucy served on the St. Augustine Restoration Foundation as well as on the St. Augustine 1580 committee, formed to create a replica of a Timucua village near the St. Augustine settlement circa 1580. This was never realized, but a film called Dream of Empire was completed.

== Personal life and legacy ==
Manucy was married three times; first to Clara (1935–1970), then Elsie (1971–1991), and finally Kathleen (1991–1997). He had four children; Bette, Evalina, James, and Mark, all by his first wife Clara. Manucy died on March 2, 1997, in St. Augustine at the age of 87. In 2000, he was honored as a Great Floridian through the "Great Floridian 2000" program, created to pay tribute to notable residents of Florida. His Great Floridian plaque is located at the National Park Service Administration Building in St. Augustine.

In addition to the Great Floridian designation, Manucy was the recipient of the Amigos de los Castillos silver medal from the Spanish government, the George Morgan Ward Medal from Rollins College in 1965, the Order of La Florida from the City of St. Augustine in 1983, an Honorary Doctorate from Flagler College in 1984, as well as awards from many historic organizations like the Florida Trust for Historic Preservation and the Eastern National Park and Monument Association.

== Bibliography ==
- Sixteenth Century St. Augustine: The People and Their Homes. (1997) ISBN 0-8130-1484-0
- The Houses of St. Augustine, 1566-1821 (1992) ISBN 0-8130-1103-5
- Menéndez: Pedro Menéndez de Avilés, Captain General of the Ocean Sea (1992) ISBN 1-56164-015-8
- Artillery Through the Ages: A Short Illustrated History of Cannon (Originally published in 1949, an official NPS publication, United States Government Printing Office, reprint: 1956 re- release:2008) ISBN 1-4344-7812-2
- The building of Castillo de San Marcos Published 1945 by U.S. Govt. print. off., reprint in Washington . Issued in 1942 as History no 1, Interpretive series of the National park service. Series [U. S.] National park service. Popular study series. History, no. 16 Library of Congress E160 .U624 no. 16
- Pedro Menendez: Captain General of the Ocean Sea (St. Augustine: The St. Augustine Historical Society) 1965
- "The Fort Caroline Museum" Albert C. Manucy president of the Florida Historical Society 1958 (reprint from the National Park Service)
- Seeing St. Augustine, a publication of the Federal Writers Project American Guide Series
- Fort Frederica color book : a history for children with Margaret Davis Cate (1957)
