= Markland (St. Augustine, Florida) =

Historic house in Florida, United States

- U.S. National Register of Historic Places
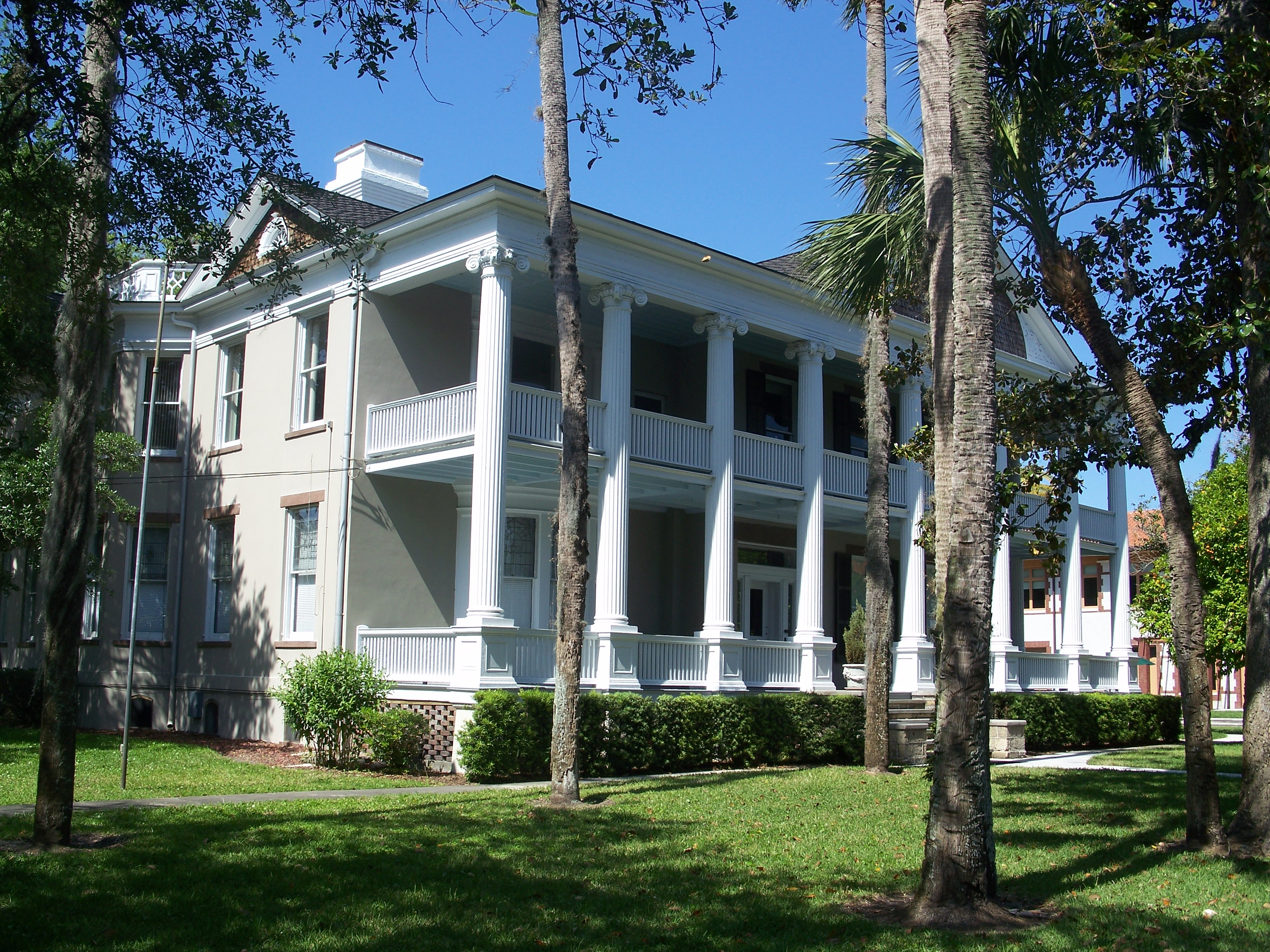
- Markland—Andrew Anderson House facade.
- Location: St. Augustine, Florida
- Coordinates: 29°53′31″N 81°19′2″W
- Built: 1839
- Architectural style: Classical Revival, Greek Revival
- NRHP reference No.: 78003080
- Added to NRHP: December 6, 1978

Markland, also known as the Andrew Anderson House, is a historic mansion in St. Augustine, Florida. It was built in the Greek Revival style of Classical Revival architecture.

== History ==
Construction on the original part of the coquina shellstone mansion was begun by New York doctor Andrew Anderson Sr. in 1839, just prior to his death in a yellow fever epidemic. Anderson had first arrived in St. Augustine with his wife and two daughters in 1829.

A portion of the land east of the residence was sold by Dr. Andrew Anderson Jr., the son of Dr. Anderson Sr, in 1887 to Henry M. Flagler for construction of the Ponce de León Hotel. Dr. Anderson Jr. died in 1924. The house was then purchased by the mayor of St. Augustine, Herbert E. Wolfe, who sold it to Flagler College in 1966.

== Present day ==
The Markland House is located at 102 King Street, down the street from the Ponce de León Hotel at 74 King Street. The house, still owned today by Flagler College, was added to the United States National Register of Historic Places on December 6, 1978.

== See also ==
- National Register of Historic Places listings in St. Johns County, Florida

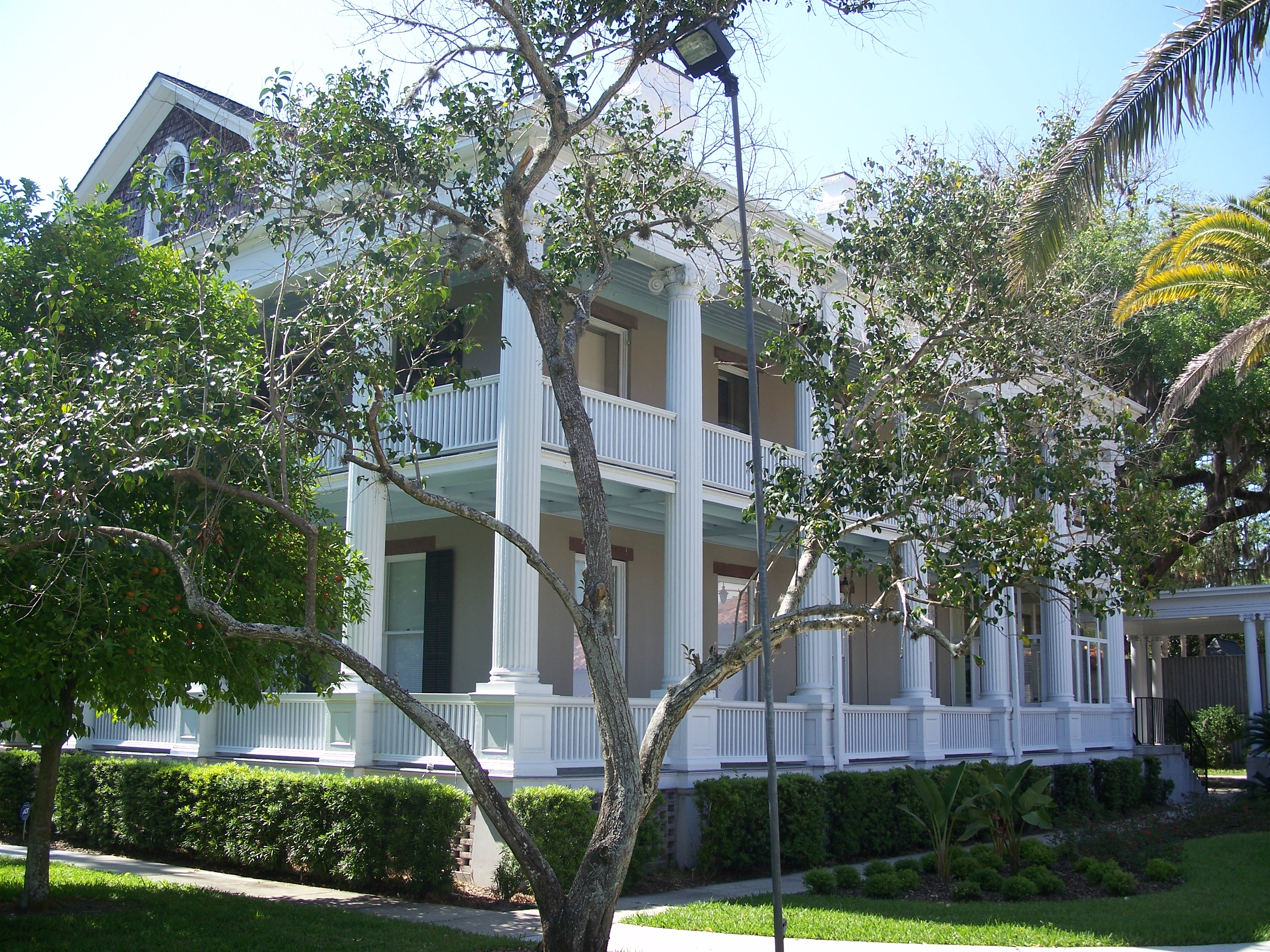
Markland — veranda and balcony.
