= List of the oldest buildings in Florida =

This article attempts to list the oldest extant buildings surviving in the state of Florida in the United States of America, including the oldest houses in Florida and any other surviving structures. Some dates are approximate and based upon dendochronology, architectural studies, and historical records. Many sites on this list date to the complex colonial period of Florida's history from the founding of Spanish St. Augustine in 1565 to American possession through the Adams-Onis Treaty in 1821. To be listed here a site must

- date from prior to 1821; or
- be the oldest building in a county, large city, or oldest of its type (church, government building, etc.),

Building	Image	Location	First Built	Use	Notes
St. Bernard de Clairvaux Church		North Miami Beach, Florida	12th century	Monastery	Built in Sacramenia in Segovia, Spain in the 12th century but dismantled in the 20th century and shipped to New York City in the United States. It was eventually reassembled in North Miami Beach.
Castillo de San Marcos		St. Augustine	1695	Government	Oldest masonry fortification in the United States
Oldest Wooden Schoolhouse		St. Augustine	1702-1716	School	
Gonzalez-Alvarez House		St. Augustine	c.1723	House	Oldest house in St. Augustine, the oldest continuously occupied European-established city in the continental United States.[2]
Fort Matanzas		St. Augustine area	1742	Government	Spanish fort
Avero House		St. Augustine	mid-18th century	House	
Pena-Peck House		St. Augustine	1750	House	
Segui-Smith House		St. Augustine	1754	House	
St. Francis Barracks		St. Augustine	1755	Religious/Military	
O'Reilly House		St. Augustine	1760-1785	House	
Rodriguez-Avero-Sanchez House		St. Augustine	1762	House	
Llambias House		St. Augustine	Before 1763	House	
González-Jones House		St. Augustine	Before 1763	House	
Lindsley House		St. Augustine	Before 1763	House	
Perez-Sanchez House		St. Augustine	Before 1763	House	
Tovar House		St. Augustine	Before 1763	House	
Gaspar-Papy House		St. Augustine	Before 1764	House	
DeMesa-Sanchez House		St. Augustine	Before 1764	House	
Paredes-Segui-MacMillan House		St. Augustine	1765-1788	House	
Don Raimundo Arrivas House		St. Augustine	Approximately 1770-1790	House	Located at 44 St. George Street. First completed restoration project of the Historic St. Augustine Preservation Board (HSAPB)
Don Manuel Solana House		St. Augustine	1788-1821	House	
Sanchez House		St. Augustine	1791	House	
Cathedral of St. Augustine		St. Augustine	1797	Church	
St. Francis Inn		St. Augustine	1791-1798	House	
Ximenez-Fatio House		St. Augustine	1798	Inn	
Kingsley Plantation		Jacksonville	1798	House	
Francisco Marin House		St. Augustine	1799	House	Located at 47 Marine Street
Julee Panton House		Pensacola	1805	House	
Charles Lavalle House		Pensacola	1805	House	
Tivoli High House		Pensacola	1976	Tavern	Replica of 1805 building demolished in 1937
Antonio Triay House		St. Augustine	1806	House	
Joaneda House		St. Augustine	1807	House	Located at 57 Treasury Street
Paredes-Dodge House		St. Augustine	1808	House	
Quina House		Pensacola	1810	House	
Prince Murat House		St. Augustine	1815-1821	House	
Oldest House		Key West	1829	House	Oldest house in Key West
The Columns		Tallahassee	1830	House, now Office	
Old Christ Church		Pensacola	1832	Church	Oldest Protestant church building in Florida
First Presbyterian Church		Tallahassee	1835-1848	Church	Oldest Presbyterian church building in Florida
Fort Dallas Barracks		Miami	1844	Barracks	
Cape Florida Light		Miami	1847	Lighthouse	Originally constructed 1826, oldest structure in Miami-Dade County
Bronson-Mulholland House		Palatka	1853-1854	House	
William Wagner House		Miami	1855	House	
Santa Rosa Masonic Lodge		Milton	1855	Fraternal Organization	Oldest standing Masonic Lodge in Florida
Orange Masonic Lodge		Apopka	1859	Fraternal Organization	Oldest structure in Orange County. Bottom Floor rebuilt in early 1950's.
Jupiter Inlet Light		Jupiter	1860	Lighthouse	
House of Refuge at Gilbert's Bar		Stuart	1876	House	Oldest house in Martin County, 1 of 10 houses of refuge set up along the Florida coast
El Modelo Cigar Factory		Jacksonville	1886	Factory	One of the oldest buildings in Downtown Jacksonville
Merrill House Museum		Jacksonville	1886	House	One of the oldest buildings in Downtown Jacksonville
Government House		St. Augustine	1706	Government	Loosely based on 18th century government house. Latest remodel in 1937.

== See also ==
- List of the oldest buildings in the United States
- National Register of Historic Places listings in Florida
