= USS Pierre =

USS Pierre may refer to one of the following ships of the United States Navy, each named after the city of Pierre, South Dakota:

- USS PC-1141, a PC-461-class submarine chaser in commission during 1943–1958 and named as USS Pierre (PC-1141) during 1956–1958
- USS Pierre (LCS-38), an Independence-class littoral combat ship, commissioned in November 2025

== See also ==
- SS Pierre Victory, a Victory ship of World War II, in service between 1944 and 1971, also named after the city of Pierre
