= Athalia Ponsell Lindsley =

Model, dancer, political activist, television personality (1917–1974)

- Born: Mary Ann Fetter; July 25, 1917; Toledo, Ohio, U.S.
- Died: January 23, 1974 (aged 56); St. Augustine, Florida, U.S.
- Cause of death: Murder
- Resting place: Oaklawn Cemetery
- Spouse: James "Jinx" Lindsley (m. 1973)

Athalia Ponsell Lindsley (July 25, 1917 – January 23, 1974) was an American model, Broadway dancer, political activist, and television personality on the show Winner Take All.

Lindsley was murdered on the front steps of her home in St. Augustine, Florida. Neighbor Alan Griffin Stanford Jr., with whom she had an ongoing feud at the time, was initially charged with her murder but was ultimately acquitted after trial. Her murder remains officially unsolved.

== Early life ==
Lindsley was born to a wealthy family in Toledo, Ohio, and was raised on the Isle of Pines, an island possession of Cuba in the Caribbean Sea. She spent 20 years in New York as a model, chorus line dancer, and hostess on Bud Collyer's television game show Winner Take All. She had dated Joseph P. Kennedy Jr., elder brother of President John F. Kennedy. There were rumors of an engagement between them, but Kennedy died while on active duty during World War II. She made an unsuccessful bid for state senator and had plans to run for a seat on the St. Johns County, Florida Commission.

She married a former mayor of St. Augustine, James "Jinx" Lindsley, a successful real estate agent, four months prior to her murder. Despite being newly married, they resided in different homes; she lived at 124 Marine Street on the Matanzas River, while he alternatively used the historic Lindsley House at 214 St. George Street and another on Lew Boulevard on Anastasia Island.

== Death ==
Lindsley had been in an ongoing feud with Alan Griffin Stanford Jr., her neighbor at 126 Marine Street. One of the concerns was the six stray dogs she took in that barked incessantly. In a transcript of an October 1973 county meeting, one of the commissioners had remarked, "I am aware you are a neighbor of the Stanfords and that y'all have had neighbor problems", to which Lindsley answered, "That's true. [But] my life has been threatened. You mention personal things. He threatened my life."

Between 5:30 p.m. and 6:00 p.m. on January 23, 1974, Lindsley was attacked on the front steps of her home at 124 Marine Street by a middle-aged white male wearing a white dress shirt and dark dress pants. According to medical examiner Dr. Arthur Schwartz, who performed the autopsy, she was struck nine times with a machete on her hand, arm, and in the head. One of her fingers was severed, and she was nearly decapitated. The only thing missing from her house was a pet blue jay, whose cage was found smashed.

Toward the end of the attack, an 18-year-old neighbor, Locke McCormick, heard the sounds of a commotion and went outside to look. He allegedly shouted to his mother that "Mr. Stanford is hitting Mrs. Ponsell". After the perpetrator left, the McCormicks went next door and saw Lindsley lying in a pool of blood on her porch and called the police.

Stanford was indicted, pleaded innocent, and was brought to trial; after two hours of jury deliberation, he was acquitted. Critics accused the police of botching the investigation and tainting evidence.

== In media ==
In 1998 Bloody Sunset in St. Augustine, a work of fiction intermixed with facts from the case, was locally published by Jim Mast and Nancy Powell, friends of Lindsley. In 2000, the cable channel A&E aired an hour-long documentary on the case in its City Confidential series titled St. Augustine: The Socialite and the Politician.

In April 2019 the case was covered on the popular online true crime show BuzzFeed Unsolved.

== Second attack ==
On November 3, 1974, Lindsley's friend and neighbor Frances Bemis went out for her evening walk and never returned. Her body was found the next day in a vacant lot on the corner of Bridge and Marine streets with her skull crushed. Having been a professional newspaper writer, amongst other professions, she may have been gathering material for a book on Lindsley's murder; she had alluded to having certain information. Her murder, like Lindsley's, was never solved.

== See also ==
- List of unsolved murders (1900–1979)
