= Marin-Hassett House =

Building in St. Augustine, Florida, US

Coordinates: 29°53′43″N 81°18′47″W

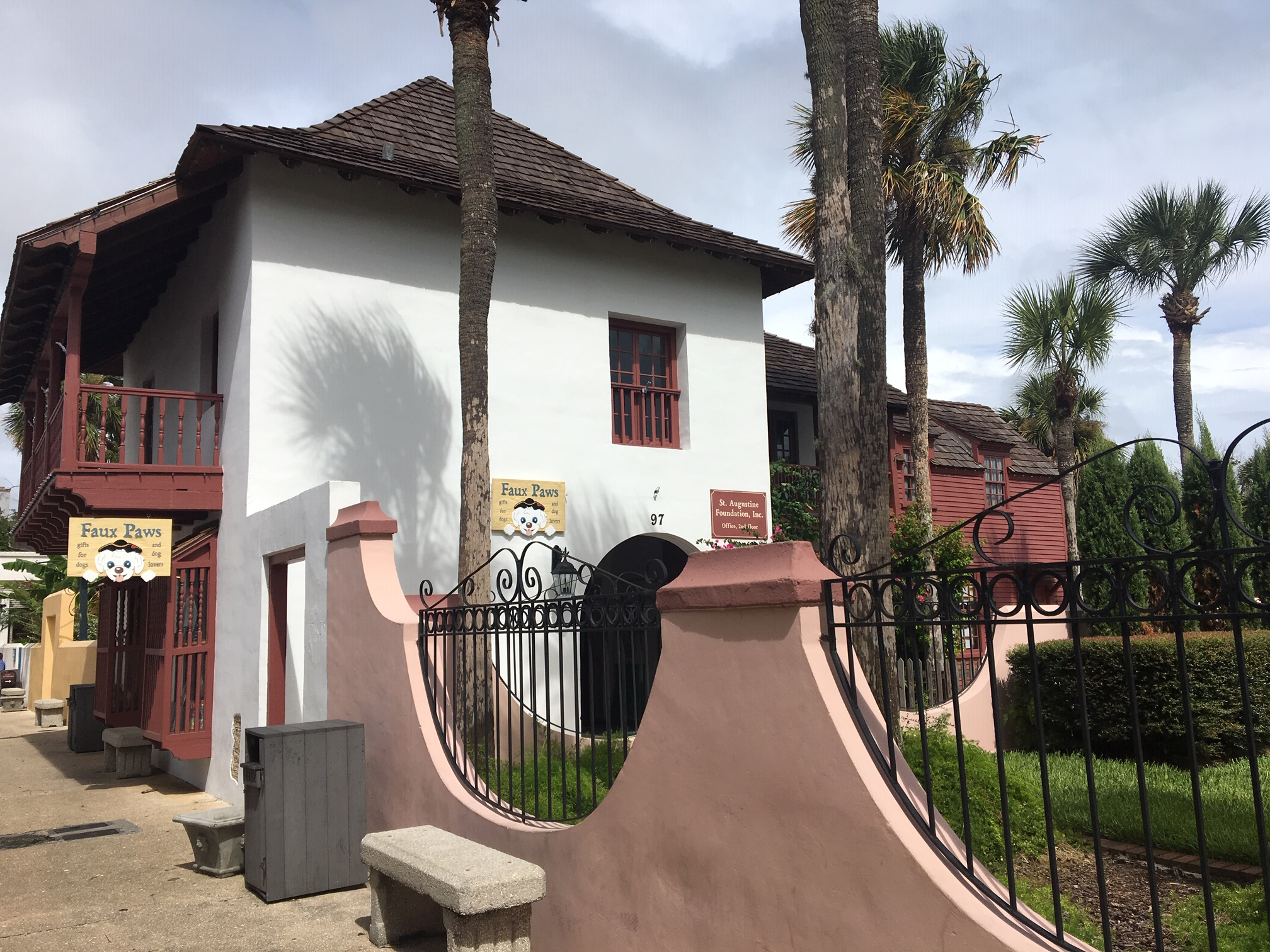
Marin-Hassett House, 2018

The Marin-Hassett House is located at 97 St. George Street in St. Augustine, Florida. It is reconstructed on its foundations that date to St. Augustine's First Spanish Period.

== History ==
There was a one-story house that stood at this site during St. Augustine's First Spanish Period (1565-1763). During the 19th century a second floor and a wooden rear wing was added. The house is mainly made of coquina and sealed with plaster. It is next to the Hispanic Garden, a replica of a formal Spanish garden, containing a bronze statue of Queen Isabella sculpted by Anna Hyatt Huntington.

The original stone house belonged to Antonia Marin. During Florida's British Period, James Box bought the house, and then a Stephen Haven bought the house. During the Second Spanish Period, in 1787, Father Thomas Hassett bought the property. Hassett was an Irish priest who served the Minorcan community of St. Augustine and established the first free school in what would become the United States.

== Restoration ==
Senator George Smathers was Chairman of the Subcommittee on Latin American Affairs of John F. Kennedy's President’s Quadricentennial Commission. On behalf of that President’s Commission, he invited the Pan American Union to take part in the restoration project occurring in downtown St. Augustine in the 1960s. The goal was to have representatives from Latin American countries arrange cultural exchanges, exhibits, and musical performances for the St. Augustine’s quadricentennial in 1965. President Kennedy likened this project to the building of Colonial Williamsburg in Williamsburg, Virginia and was quoted as saying, “I can see how valuable it will be to have a similar symbol of the cultural heritage which came to us from Hispanic-American sources. This can be a most important new symbolic bond with our Latin-American neighbors to the south (as well as to Spain across the ocean.”

St. Augustine Restoration Inc. bought the property (formerly housing the Manufacturer's Outlet Store and St. George Tavern) and reconstructed the Marin-Hassett House using funds donated by American corporations that had done business in Latin America, such as Ford, General Motors, Texaco, and Gulf. It took $25,000 to purchase the land and $27,066 to build the center.

Earle Newton, Director-General of the Quadricentennial Commission in St. Augustine, served as the first curator of the Pan American Center. Dr. Carlton Calkin then served as curator. The center housed art exhibits of hispanic origin. The Pan-American Center was to complement the nearby Spanish government cultural and exhibition center, as well as expected U.S. government, State of Florida, and British government centers.

On April 24, 1965 representatives of several nations of the Organization of American States participating in a cornerstone ceremony for the Center. Representatives included those from Argentina, Brazil, Colombia, Costa Rica, the Dominican Republic, Ecuador, Paraguay, Guatemala, Peru, Panama, Honduras, and the United States.

Statutes on display included, especially during the Christmas season, religion icons from the 17th-19th centuries from Mexico, Ecuador, Peru, and Guatemala. The Center had a three-foot statue of Saint Augustine. Most statues were painted and covered with gesso, a mixture of plaster and glue. In January 1968, the Pan American Center displayed a replica of a mummy found along the south coast of Peru in a Paracas Tomb as part of its Pre-Columbian exhibit. Most objects continuously displayed in the Pan American Center came from tombs (pottery, gold jewelry, sculpture, or textiles). The oldest artifact in the collection, however, was a netted textile from 600 B.C.E. Peru.

== Hispanic Garden ==
In the late 18th century Father Hassett grew a vegetable plot and orchard on the land to the south of the house. In the mid-20th century this same space was converted from an Appliance Center and used as a garden again, linked the building to the Spanish Exhibition Center across the street. The garden was made possible by a donation of Jessie Ball duPont, supplemented by contributions from garden clubs and other organizations. The landscaping was accomplished by the Women’s Garden Clubs of Florida.

== Present day ==
Today the downstairs of the Marin-Hassett House is retail space operated by dog store Faux Paws. The upstairs of the house is St. Augustine Foundation Inc. The entire building is owned by St. Augustine Foundation, Inc.

== See also ==
- Casa del Hidalgo
