= Joaneda House (St. Augustine) =

Coordinates: 29°53′37″N 81°18′49″W

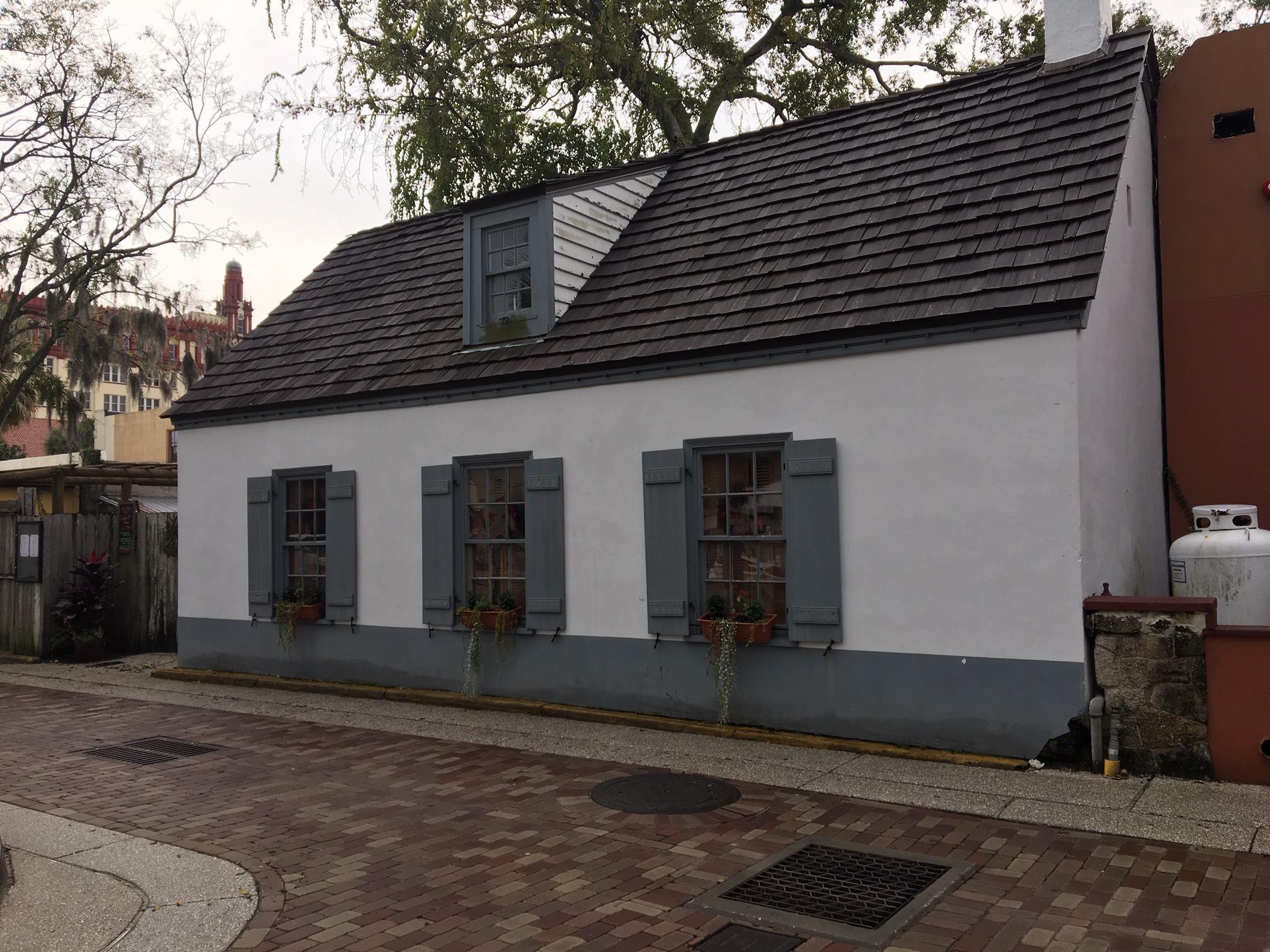
Joaneda House, 2018

The Joaneda House is located at 57 Treasury Street in St. Augustine, Florida. It was restored to be an example of a Second Spanish Period (1784-1821) residence. It is one of the oldest buildings in Florida.

== History ==
The Joaneda house was built around the year 1806 out of wood and was originally owned by Juan Joaneda, a Minorcan fish farmer. The house had a wooden floor. Joaneda then rebuilt the house out of coquina and sold it for a profit to a Juan Gonzáles Montes de Oca. Around 1809, Montes de Oca sold the house to the son-in-law of Juan Joaneda. The house's main entrance was through the yard and the entire property was enclosed by a wall and fence. The wall was reconstructed in 1976. There were originally three rooms on the first floor with an open porch on the south side.

In 1888 the building was used as a tailor shop and the main entrance moved to the street. It later became a Minorcan restaurant. In the 1920s the Montgomery sisters turned the Joaneda House into a gift shop. They enclosed the porch and built a six-room addition to the south that doubled the size of the building. They also put in a concrete tile floor. In the 1970s the house was "restored" by Elizabeth Morley Towers of Jacksonville and used as a part-time local residence during her lifetime. It has since been turned to commercial use.

== Restoration ==
In 1972, the sons of Elizabeth Morley Towers bought her the Joaneda House for $35,000. Towers was a member of the Historic St. Augustine Preservation Board (HSAPB) and donated the house to the Board. The Joaneda House Development Project began in 1976 and was completed in 1977. Archaeological excavations on the lot were completed before restoration work began, in 1975. The cost of the project was $82,476. The purpose of this restoration project was to display an example of a Second Spanish Period residence in downtown St. Augustine and to also provide accommodation for people associated with the Historic St. Augustine Preservation Board. Restoration work was supervised by HSAPB Director of Research Robert Steinbach.

== Present day ==
Today the Joaneda House operates as a restaurant and wine shop. The building is owned by the State of Florida and managed on its behalf by University of Florida Historic St. Augustine.
