= Casa del Hidalgo =

Building in St. Augustine, Florida, US

Coordinates: 29°53′41″N 81°18′46″W

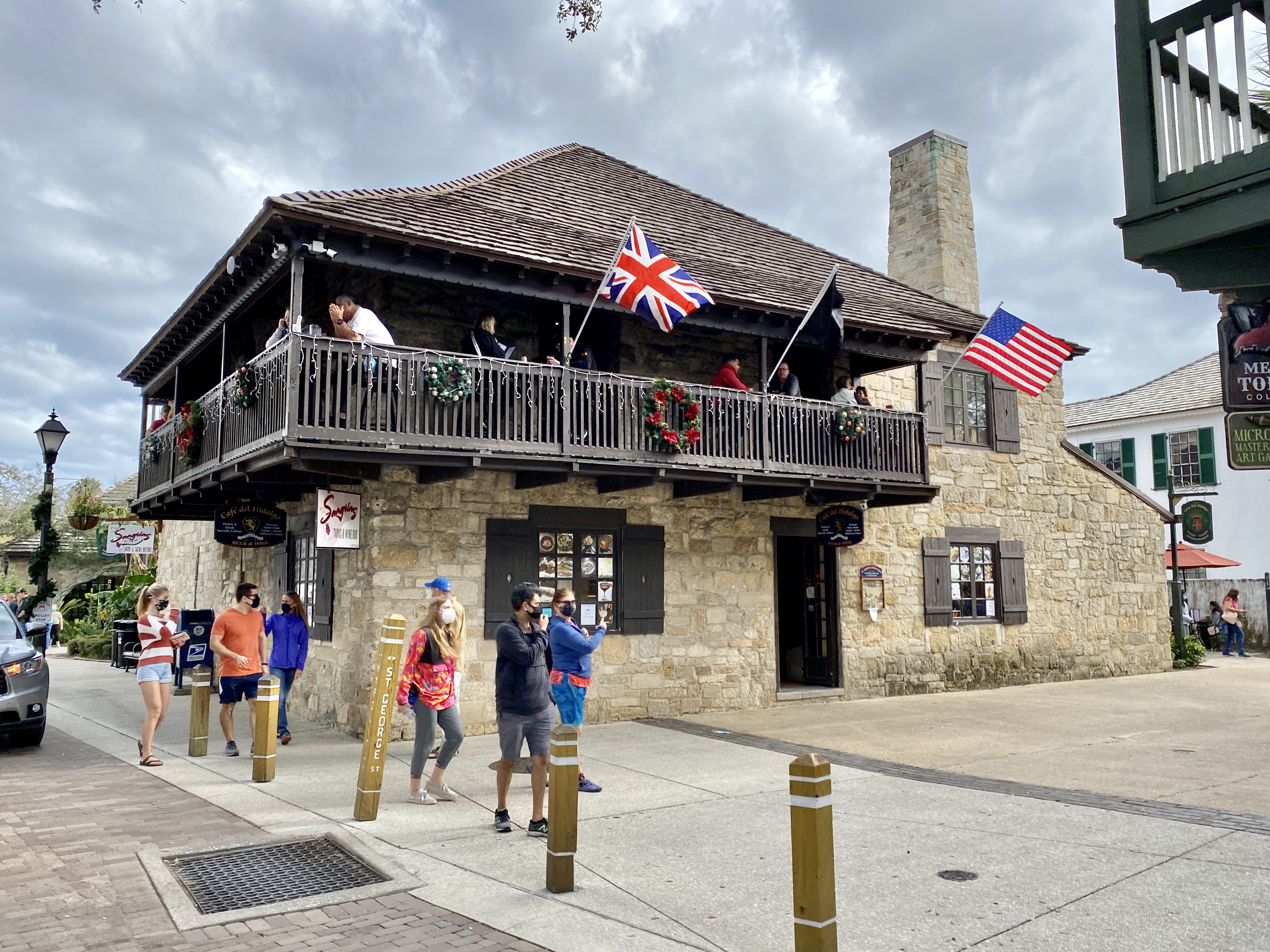
Casa del Hidalgo as seen from the intersection of St. George and Hypolita Streets in December 2020

The Casa del Hidalgo is located at 35 Hypolita Street, at the southeast intersection of Hypolita and St. George Streets in downtown St. Augustine, Florida. It was constructed in 1965 and housed the Spanish government's official exhibition and cultural center.

== History ==
The Government of Spain purchased the lot on St. George Street with the intent to reconstruct a 17th-century Spanish colonial structure to contribute to the Restoration Area, a historic preservation project being undertaken by the State of Florida in advance of the 400th anniversary of St. Augustine's founding. This lot was adjacent to the lot on which the Marin-Hassett House, which housed the Pan-American Center (sponsored by the Organization of American States), would be reconstructed, and directly adjacent to the plot of land that became the Hispanic Garden.

The structure that was located on the property prior to the construction of the Casa del Hidalgo was the Weinstein building. It was a three-story wooden structure that served as a grocery store, and was demolished in 1964 to make way for construction on the new building.

== Construction and Dedication ==
The cornerstone of the Casa del Hidalgo was laid by Don Manuel Fraga, Spain's Minister of Information and Tourism, on October 19, 1964. The cornerstone was taken from the former home of Pedro Menendez, founder of St. Augustine, in Aviles, Spain. Prior to its arrival in St. Augustine, the stone had been displayed at the New York World's Fair in both the Spanish Pavilion and the Florida Pavilion. The building was designed by Spanish architect Javier Barroso, and the construction work was completed by Butler Building and Contracting. The two story, 10,000 square foot house was constructed of coquina.

The Casa del Hidalgo cost $200,000 to build, and was dedicated in September 1965 by Lieutenant Colonel Camilo Alonso Vega, Spain's Minister of the Interior. Other dignitaries in attendance at the dedication included U.S. Secretary of the Interior Stewart Udall, Florida Governor Haydon Burns, and Senator Spessard Holland. Local participants in the ceremony included Herbert E. Wolfe, Director of the National Quadricentennial Commission, Earle Newton, executive director of the St. Augustine Historical Restoration and Preservation Commission, St. Augustine Mayor John D. Bailey, and Archbishop Joseph Hurley, who blessed the building.

== Exhibition and Cultural Center ==
Immediately after irs dedication, the Casa del Hidalgo was opened to the public. It was managed by Joaquin Pujol, the assistant director of the Spanish National Tourist Office. There was no admission charge, and the exhibition center was open seven days a week. It was housed with rotating exhibits provided by the Spanish government, with many of the artifacts on display coming from the 1964 World's Fair, including decorative arts and other Spanish crafts. In addition to an exhibit space, the Casa del Hidalgo also housed a tourism office for those interested in visiting Spain.

== Present Day ==
Today, the Casa del Hidalgo operates as multi-tenant retail and restaurant space.
