= Elizabeth Towers =

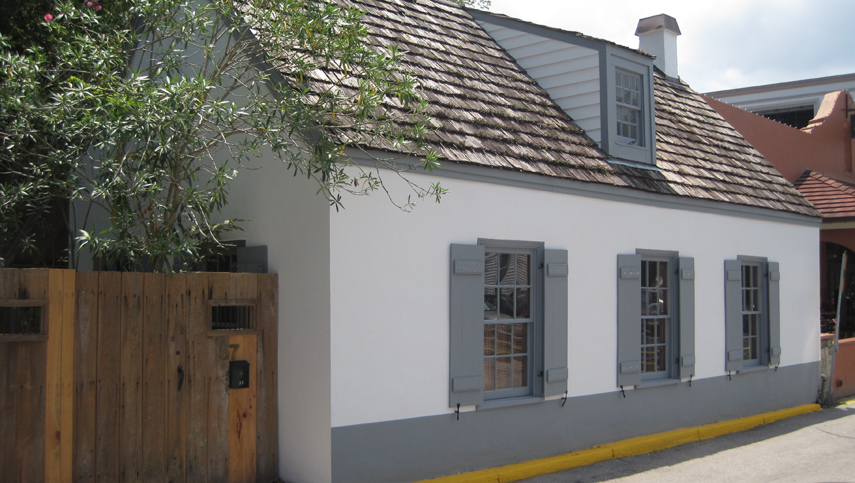
The Joaneda House, St. Augustine, Florida

Elizabeth Towers (1899–1985) was an American philanthropist and socialite known for her dedication to historic preservation in northeast Florida.

== Biography ==
Sarah Elizabeth de Lannoy Morley Towers was born on April 27, 1899, in Buena Vista, Colorado. After her father died in a mining accident, the family moved to Swarthmore, Pennsylvania, where they lived from 1903 to 1910, when Elizabeth and her mother moved to Cambridge, Massachusetts. She attended Mrs. Coit's School for Girls.

Towers moved to Jacksonville, Florida after her marriage to Charles Daughtry Towers in 1920. She was an active member of the Florida Society of Colonial Dames, which restored the Ximenez-Fatio House in St. Augustine, and served as its librarian for many years. Towers was the first female chairman of the Florida Board of Parks and Historic Memorials. She served as a member of the St. Augustine Historical and Preservation Commission from 1965 to 1969, and was appointed to a second term after the commission was renamed the Historic St. Augustine Preservation Board, serving from 1971 to 1979. She was the only woman on the board at the time, and spearheaded the fundraising and planning committee for the Hispanic Garden in downtown St. Augustine. She also donated funds for the Preservation Board to purchase the land on which the Gonzales and de Hita Houses were reconstructed. Her sons bought the Joaneda House for Towers, who restored it and later donated it to the Preservation Board.

Elizabeth and Daughtry had four children; Betty, Sarah, Charlie, and Bill, and 16 grandchildren. She was the recipient of many awards during her lifetime, including two keys to the City of St. Augustine, an award for her volunteer service to the American Red Cross, and was posthumously honored as a Great Floridian in 2000 (her plaque appears on the Joaneda House). Elizabeth Towers died in March 1985 at the age of 86.
