= Hispanic Garden =

Park in St. Augustine, Florida, United States

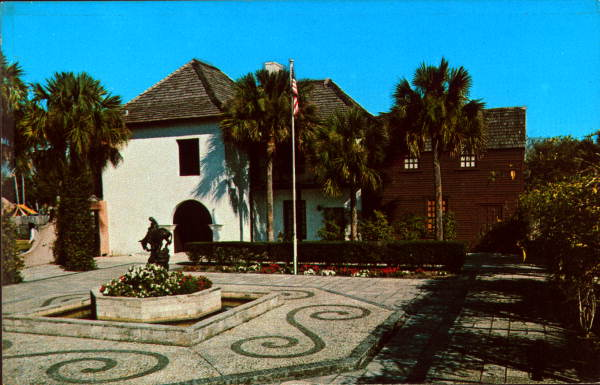
- Interactive map of Hispanic Garden
- Location: St. Augustine, Florida
- Coordinates: 29°53′41.6″N 81°18′46.6″W
- Opened: 1965
- Owner: St. Augustine Foundation, Inc.

The Hispanic Plaza is a garden in St. Augustine, Florida, owned and maintained by the St. Augustine Foundation, Inc. It is closed to the public and is only open for special city events.

== History and design ==
In the early 1960's, the St. Augustine Historical Restoration and Preservation Commission (later renamed the Historic St. Augustine Preservation Board) bought the plot of land between the Casa del Hidalgo, once a tourism office run by the Spanish Government, and the Pan American Center to build a garden as a symbolic link between the shared Hispanic heritage of Spain, Latin America, and Florida. Commission member Elizabeth Towers established and led the Hispanic Garden Committee in order to raise the $45,000 needed to complete the garden. The committee held a variety of fundraising events, including fashion shows, teas, and art auctions. They also sold small items including jewelry, letter openers, key rings, coins, and paper bulls donated by the Spanish Pavilion at the 1964 New York World's Fair. Philanthropist, Great Floridian, and Florida Women's Hall of Fame inductee Jessie Ball duPont donated over $30,000 to the garden project.

Landscape architects Lee Schmoll and Drusilla Gjoerloff were chosen to design the garden. The design was inspired by plazoletas, classic Spanish gardens like ones seen at the Alhambra Palace. It was laid out in a trapezoid, measuring 76 by 82 feet. The arbor was decorated with Confederate jasmine and Cherokee roses to act as a shaded walkway and rest area. There was no grass in the garden in order to maintain a historically accurate appearance. Plants included in the design were cabbage palms, kumquats, marigolds, yaupon holly, and Burfordi holly, chosen because they were native to northeast Florida or were introduced by Spanish settlers in the 16th century.

Sculptor Anna Hyatt Huntington created and donated a bronze sculpture of Queen Isabella.

== Quadricentennial and dedication ==
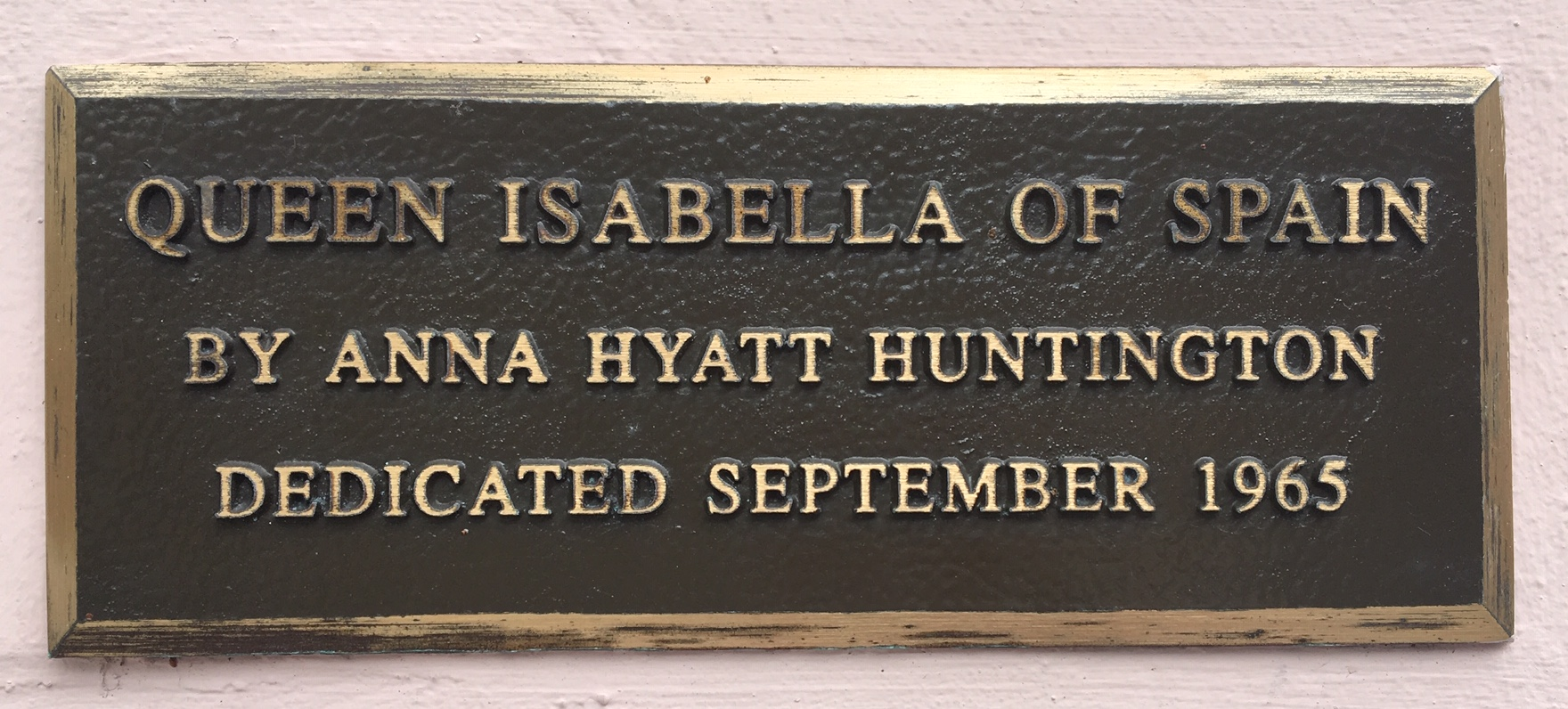
Anna Hyatt Huntington Plaque at the Hispanic Garden

The Hispanic Garden Committee sought to have the Hispanic Garden completed by the city's 400th anniversary on September 8, 1965. Though unfinished, the garden was dedicated on September 5, 1965, as part of the celebrations. The project was eventually completed two years later and was rededicated on May 2, 1967. Attendees included Senator Spessard Holland, Senator George Smathers, Secretary of the Interior Stewart Udall, Ambassador Alfonso Merry del Val, Director-General of the Spanish Ministry of Foreign Affairs Ángel Sagaz Zubelzu, and Governor Haydon Burns. At that time, the name was changed from Hispanic Garden to Hispanic Plaza. Archbishop Joseph Hurley and St. Augustine Mayor John D. Bailey attended the ceremony.

== Current use ==
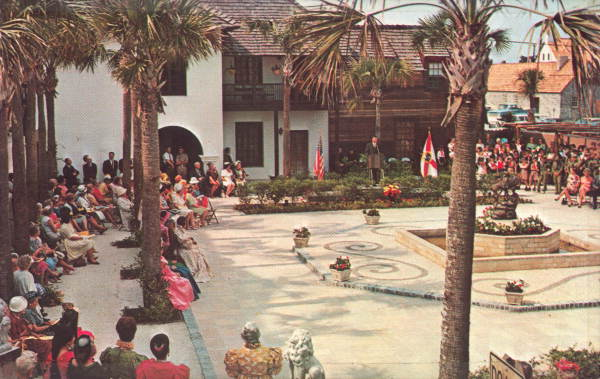
Special Event at the Hispanic Garden

Between 2000 and 2003, the bronze statue of Queen Isabella was removed from the Hispanic Garden during an archaeological dig. The dig uncovered American Indian, British, Spanish, and American artifacts. There were talks at this time on building over the garden site. After 2003, a new fence was erected around the garden, addressing previous concerns of vandalism within the space. The city of St. Augustine had not budgeted sufficient funds to complete the upkeep and restoration project of 2003. A local business owner, David Drysdale, donated necessary funds. The park is currently used for events such as the St. Augustine Easter Week Festival and knighting ceremonies.
