= Frances Bemis =

American murder victim

- Born: June 25, 1898; Fulton County, Georgia
- Died: November 3, 1974 (aged 76); St. Augustine, Florida
- Education: Oglethorpe University; University of California
- Occupation: Public relations specialist
- Known for: Unsolved murder

Frances Bemis (June 25, 1898 – November 3, 1974) was a public relations specialist, newspaper writer, radio producer, and fashion director. She was also a World War II veteran, serving as a corporal of the Women's Army Auxiliary Corps.

She attended college at Oglethorpe University and the University of California. After graduating college she returned to Georgia and wrote columns for both the Atlanta Constitution and Atlanta Journal; at the same time she began her public relations career by handling publicity for the Woman's Club of Atlanta.

At the time of her death, Bemis was allegedly gathering information in order to write a true crime book on the murder of her friend and neighbor Athalia Ponsell Lindsley. Bemis herself was murdered during an evening walk, at a short distance from her house. Both murders remain unsolved.

== Biography ==
In the late 1920s, she moved to New York City to develop a dual career in public relations and advertising. She was contracted by various New York City department stores to develop advertising by staging various types of publicity events. In 1932, she was hired by Brooklyn-based Hearn's as a fashion promoter and publicist. Among the publicity events she staged at the store were a fashion contest emceed by gossip columnist and society figure Elsa Maxwell and a Thanksgiving Day circus in Central Park. Bemis wrote the press releases for the events she staged and occasionally made the front page of New York City newspapers herself.

In 1938, Bemis resigned from Hearn's to do free-lance public relations for a variety of diverse companies, including the Ford Motor Company, which she worked to promote at the 1939 New York World's Fair, and the Claire Wolff modeling agency.

In 1943, Bemis enlisted in the Women's Army Auxiliary Corps and was stationed in Daytona Beach, Florida, giving radio addresses and coordinating entertainment at the local U.S.O. She was honorably discharged with the rank of corporal.

She then coordinated a wartime fashion show in New York City sponsored by The New York Times, entitled "Fashions of the Times". She then went to Atlanta to become Director of Special Events at Rich's Department Store (1946–1947), then back to New York to take a position as Director of Feature Events at Abraham & Straus Department Store, where she worked until 1954.

In 1956, Bemis semi-retired to St. Augustine, Florida, where she engaged in charitable work for various causes, worked as a publicist for the city and wrote for several local newspapers.

== Death ==
On January 23, 1974, her friend and close neighbor on Marine Street, fellow socialite Athalia Ponsell Lindsley, was hacked to death with a machete on Lindsley's front porch. Another neighbor was indicted and tried for the crime but was acquitted. The investigation into the crime was fraught with controversy and no one else was charged in the murder. Bemis, who may have been gathering information for a book, alluded to the fact that she had information pertinent to the case. On November 3, 1974, she went out for her evening walk and never returned. Her body was discovered about 7 p.m. a block and a half from her house, her skull crushed by a cement block. Her murder, like Lindsley's, remains unsolved.

== See also ==
- List of unsolved murders (1900–1979)
