= Merrill-Stevens Drydock & Repair Co. =

Former shipbuilding company in Florida

Merrill-Stevens Drydock & Repair Co. was a shipbuilding and drydock company currently based in Miami, Florida. The company was incorporated in 1885 in Jacksonville, Florida by James Eugene Merrill, and was located along the St. Johns River. The Miami shipyard was sold to Turkish yachtsman Rahmi Koç in December 2013, and is now named "RMK Merrill-Stevens". The yacht brokerage company is now called "Merrill Stevens Yachts" According to the company, it was the largest Atlantic shipyard south of Norfolk, Virginia during World War II.

== See also ==
- Merrill House Museum
