= De Mesa-Sánchez House =

Coordinates: 29°53′46″N 81°18′47″W

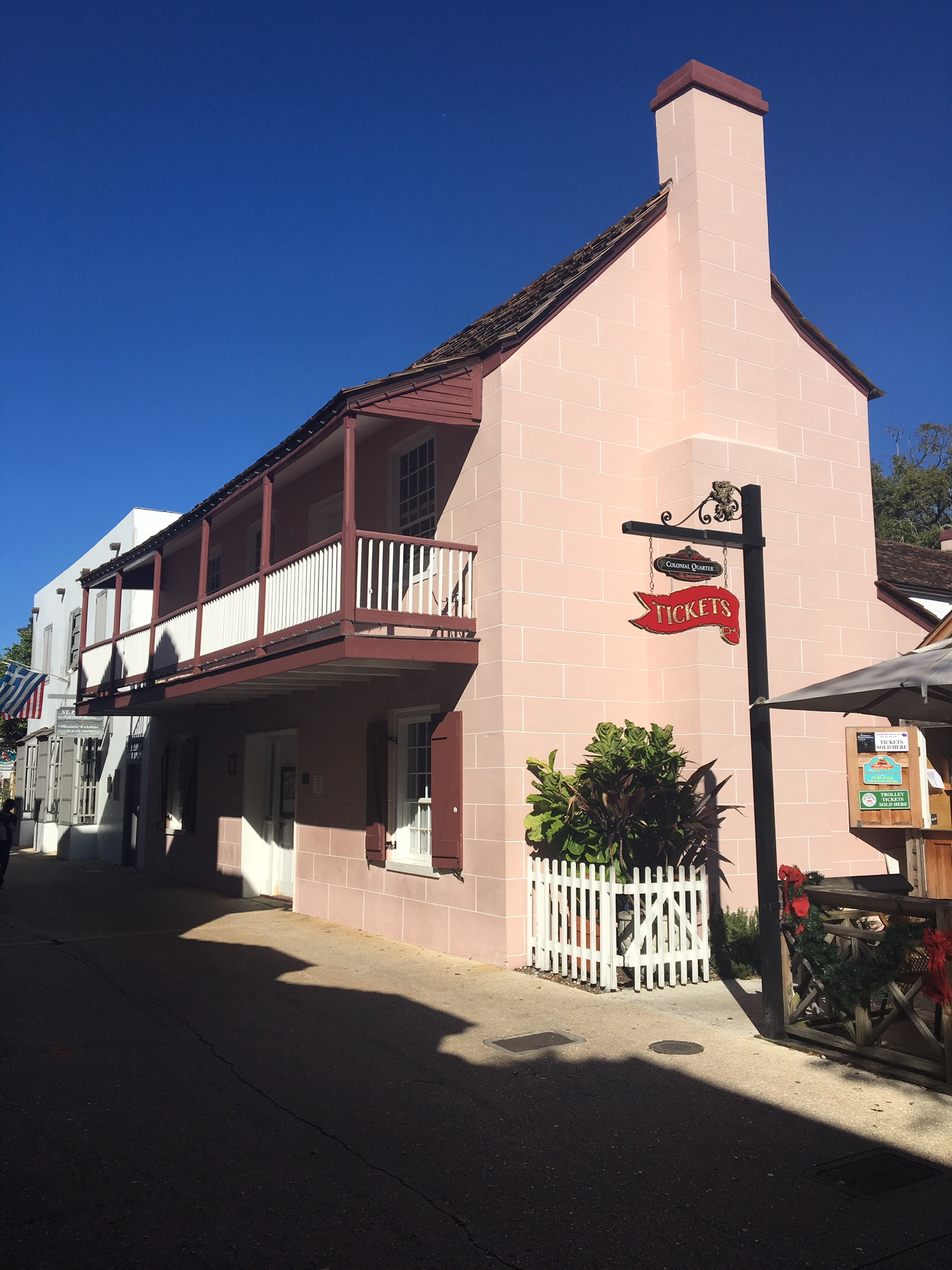
De Mesa-Sanchez House, 2018

The De Mesa-Sánchez House is located at 43 St. George Street in St. Augustine, Florida. It is a restoration of a home dating back to East Florida's First Spanish Period.

== History ==
The first known owner of the home was Antonio De Mesa. He was a Royal Treasury guard who came to St. Augustine around 1740. The original home was a one-story, one room structure made of coquina, as many homes were during the First Spanish Period (1565-1763) in St. Augustine. De Mesa lived there with his wife and seven children until 1763, when the British took control of East Florida from the Spanish. During the British Period (1763-1783), the house was used as a governmental office. Owners during this time included William Walton, head of an export company in New York City, the British crown, and Joseph Stout. Several rooms were added to the house during this period.

When Spain regained East Florida in 1784, don Juan Sánchez purchased the house. He was a master caulker of the Royal Works. He also added on to the property, adding a second floor and a detached kitchen. (Juan Sánchez later also bought another property on St. George Street, the Pellicer-De Burgo House, to rent out). During Sánchez's ownership, the Royal Treasury occupied a part of the house. James Lisk bought the De Mesa-Sánchez House in 1835. He connected the kitchen to the rest of the house, covered the coquina in stucco, and painted the house pink.

== Restoration ==
Leased in 1957 by a Mr. and Mrs. G.H. Bath, the building was completely remodeled to resemble a typical 18th century rural northern Spanish inn, and was opened to the public in July 1959.

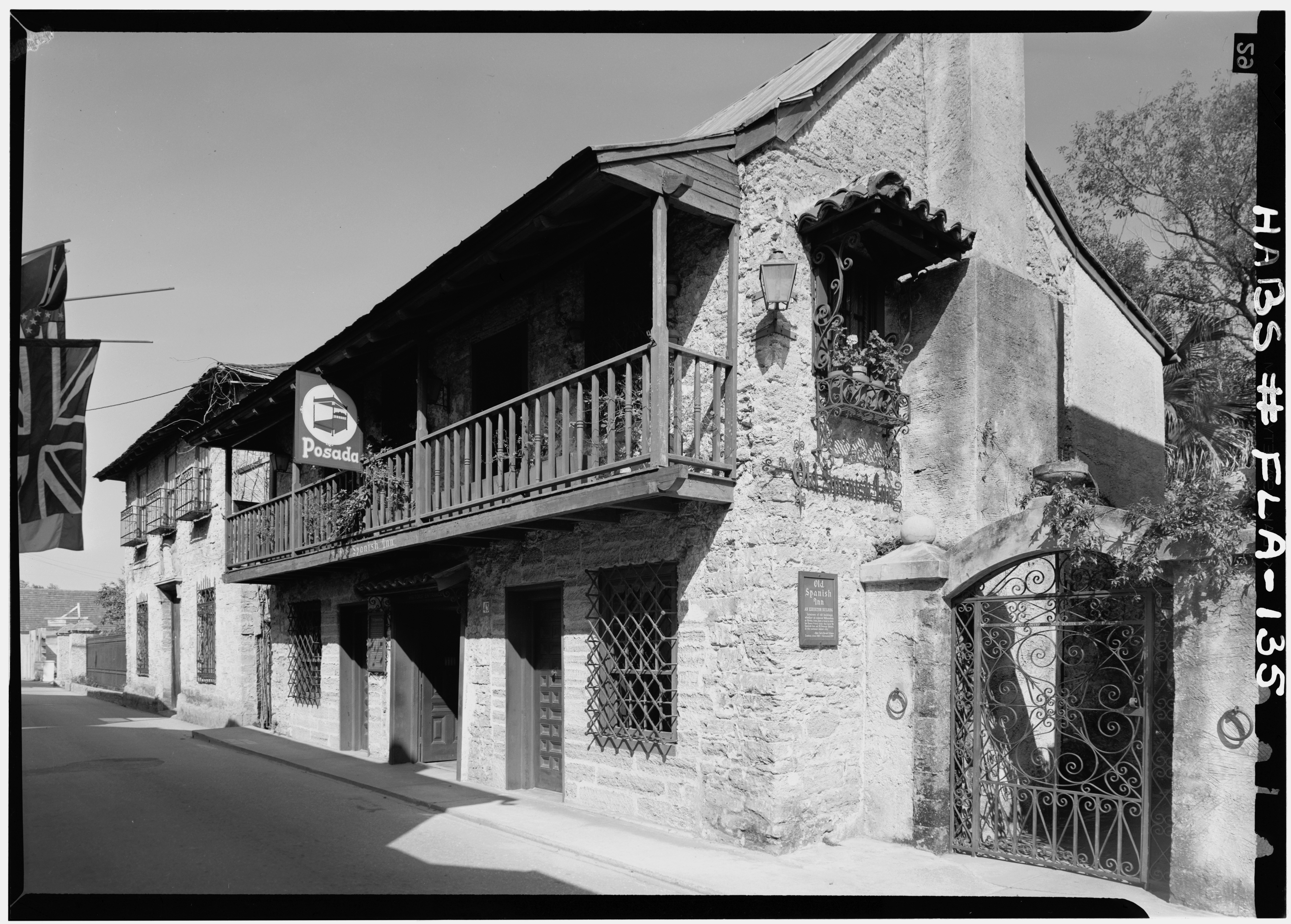
De Mesa-Sanchez House, 1965 (HABS)

The De Mesa-Sánchez House was documented as part of the Historic American Buildings Survey in 1960 (FLA-55). Full documentation is available on the Library of Congress online catalog.

The St. Augustine Restoration Inc. acquired the De Mesa-Sánchez House and its contents in 1965 from Mr. and Mrs. Bath for $115,000, the largest property transaction to date in the history of the organization. In 1977, ownership was transferred to the Historic St. Augustine Preservation Board. It was restored and was part of San Agustín Antiguo, the Preservation Board's 18th century living history museum. It was restored to its 1830s appearance, interpreted to represent the home during Florida's American Territorial Period.

From March through September 1977, a field school from Florida State University led by Kathleen Deagan conducted an archaeological excavation at the De Mesa-Sánchez House, thanks to a grant provided by the National Park Service.

== Present Day ==
Today the De Mesa-Sánchez House is part of the Colonial Quarter museum complex. It is owned by the State of Florida and managed on its behalf by University of Florida Historic St. Augustine, Inc. The original structure occupied by De Mesa and his family now makes up the northwest corner of the building.
