= Rodriguez-Avero-Sanchez House =

Historic house in Florida, United States

- U.S. National Register of Historic Places
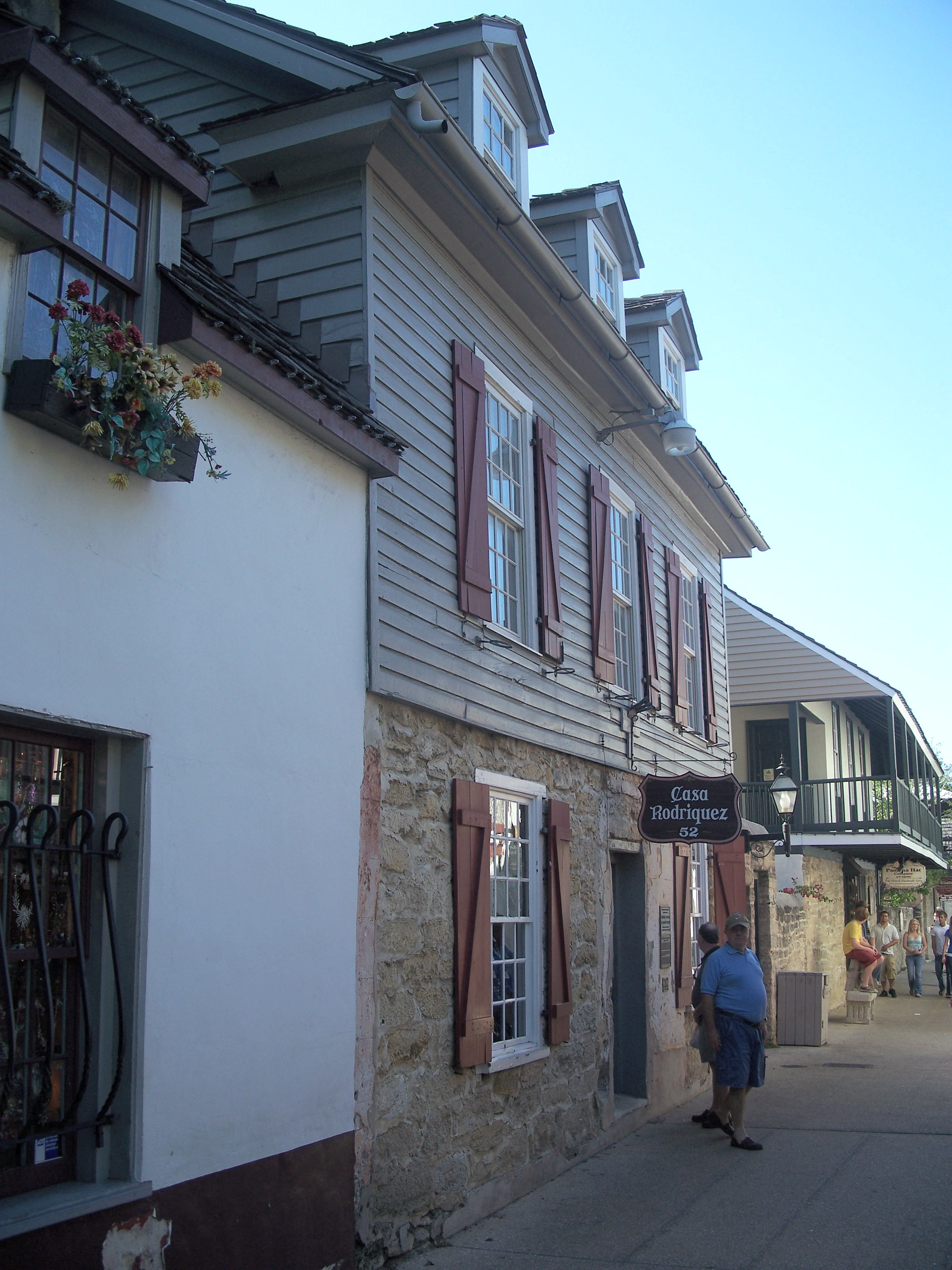

- Location within Florida Location within the United States
- Location: St. Augustine, Florida
- Coordinates: 29°53′46″N 81°18′49″W
- NRHP reference No.: 71001015
- Added to NRHP: April 16, 1971

The Rodriguez-Avero-Sanchez House is a historic home in St. Augustine, Florida. It is located at 52 St. George Street. It was built in 1762. On April 16, 1971, it was added to the U.S. National Register of Historic Places.

== Gallery ==
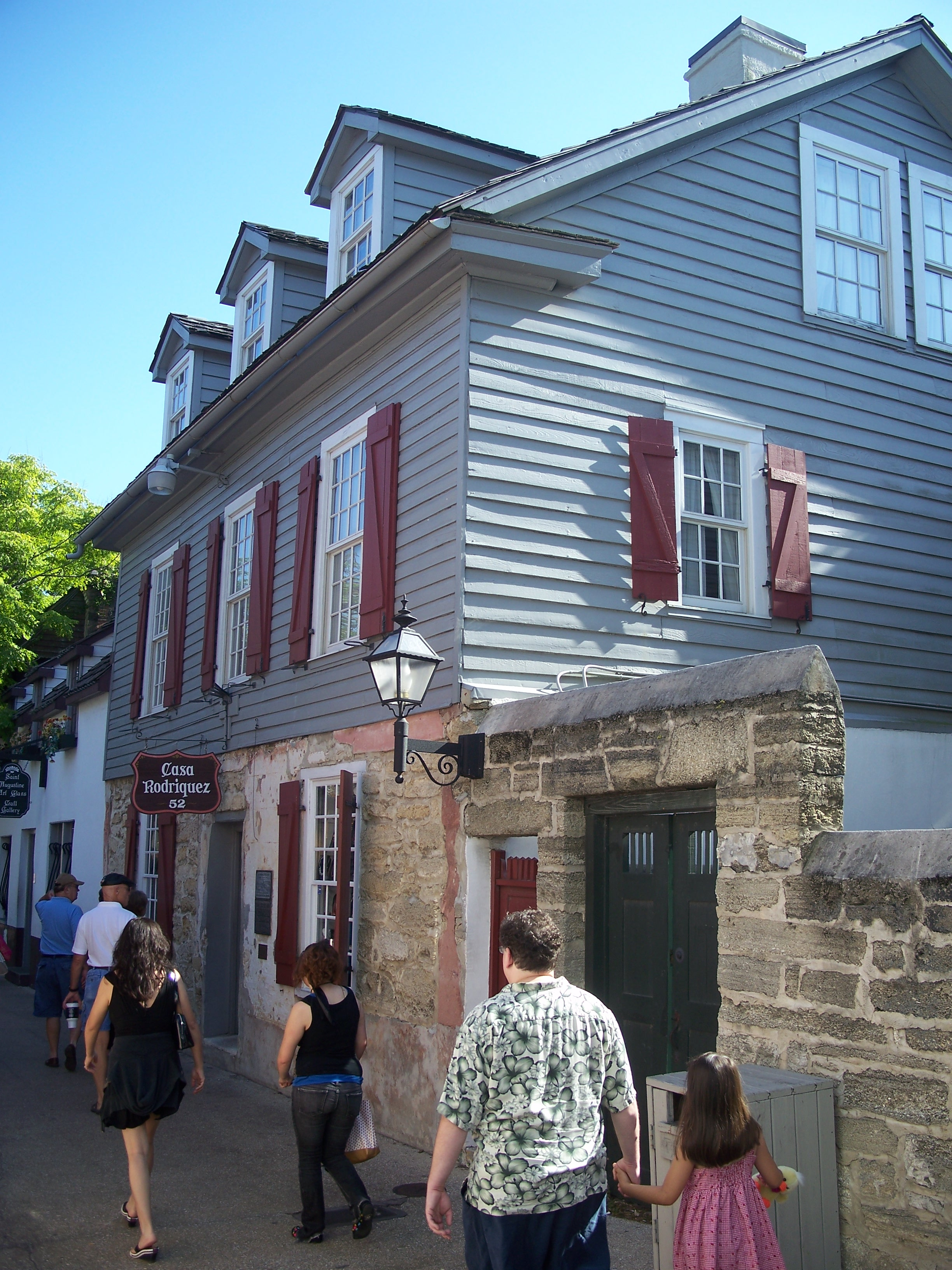

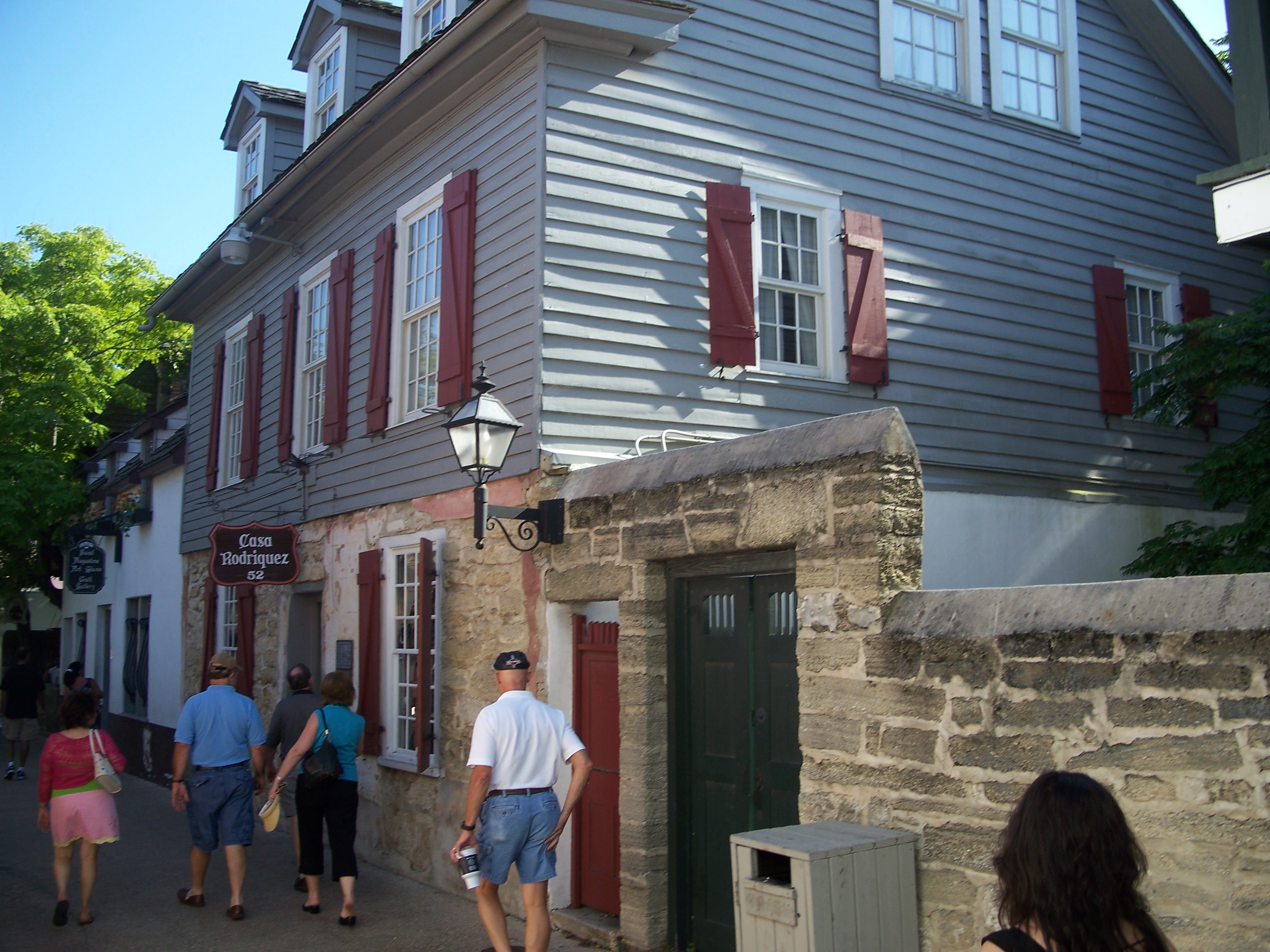

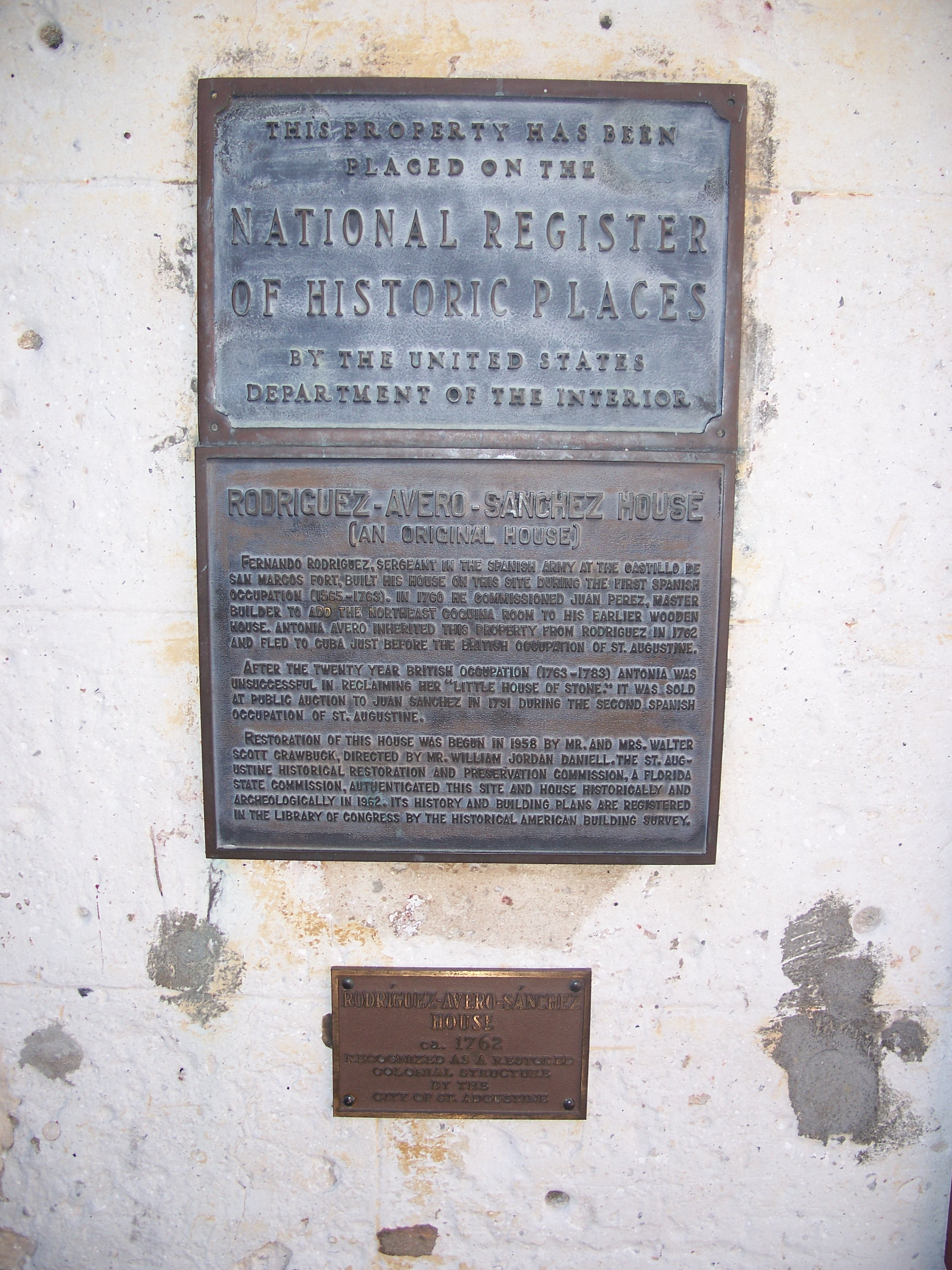
