= USS PC-1141 =

Submarine chaser built for the US Navy

History

United States
- Name: USS PC-1141
- Builder: Defoe Shipbuilding Company, Bay City, Michigan
- Laid down: 12 March 1943
- Launched: 22 June 1943
- Commissioned: 23 December 1943
- Renamed: USS Pierre (PC-1141), 15 February 1956
- Namesake: Pierre, South Dakota
- Decommissioned: 25 October 1958
- Stricken: 25 October 1958
- Fate: Transferred to Indonesian Navy, 25 October 1958

History

Indonesia
- Name: KRI Tjakalang
- Namesake: Skipjack tuna
- Acquired: 25 October 1958
- Stricken: 1981
- Fate: unknown

General characteristics
- Class & type: PC-461-class submarine chaser
- Displacement: 280 long tons (284 t) light; 450 long tons (457 t) full
- Length: 173 ft 8 in (52.93 m)
- Beam: 23 ft (7.0 m)
- Draft: 7 ft 7 in (2.31 m)
- Propulsion: 2 × 2,880 bhp (2,148 kW) General Motors 16-278A diesel engines; Farrel-Birmingham single reduction gear; 2 shafts
- Speed: 20 knots (37 km/h; 23 mph)
- Complement: 65 officers and enlisted
- Armament: 1 × 3"/50 caliber guns; 1 × 40 mm guns; 3 × 20 mm guns; 2 × rocket launchers; 4 × depth charge projectors; 2 × depth charge tracks

USS PC-1141 was a PC-461-class submarine chaser built for the United States Navy during World War II. She was renamed USS Pierre (PC-1141) in 1956, was decommissioned from the U.S. Navy in October 1958, and transferred to the Indonesian Navy as KRI Tjakalang.

== Career ==
PC–1141 was laid down by the Defoe Shipbuilding Company of Bay City, Michigan, on 12 March 1943, launched on 22 June 1943, and commissioned at New Orleans, Louisiana, on 23 December 1943, as USS PC-1141.

After fitting out at the Naval Station, PC-1141 departed New Orleans on 6 January 1944 and arrived three days later at the Submarine Chaser Training Center, Miami, Florida. Shakedown off Miami was followed by alterations at the Merrill-Stevens Drydock & Repair Co., Miami, until 13 February when she departed for training at the Fleet Sonar School, Key West. She was assigned duty under Commander Gulf Sea Frontier and escorted convoys in the Gulf of Mexico and between Key West, Miami, and Cuba. On 13 May she sailed from Key West escorting a convoy which reached New York on 18 May.

PC-1141 was assigned duty under Commander Eastern Sea Frontier and based her operations from the Naval Frontier Base, Tompkinsville, New York, until 18 June. She made twelve escort voyages from New York to Guantánamo Bay and back, 31 May 1944 to 10 May 1945. After overhaul at the Marine Basin Co., and the Naval Frontier Base, she departed New York with four other submarine chasers on 18 June, reaching San Diego on 9 July. PC-1141 then steamed independently to Pearl Harbor Navy Yard, arriving on 25 July for duty with the Service Force, U.S. Pacific Fleet. On 7 August she got underway as escort unit of a convoy which arrived at Kwajalein Atoll, Marshall Islands, on 17 August.

She remained in the Marshalls through 12 February 1946, conducting air-sea rescue patrol off Kwajalein and Roi Islands and standing by for long range air-sea rescue work. She departed Kwajalein on 12 February and arrived at the Mare Island Navy Yard on 17 March for upkeep.

PC-1141 sailed from San Francisco on 15 June for brief operations at Pearl Harbor, then steamed to Pago Pago Harbor, Tutuila, Samoa, arriving on 15 July. A unit of Service Division 11 of the Service Force, U.S. Pacific Fleet, she was based at Pago Pago until late in January 1948, conducting rescue station patrol among the Samoan Islands with periodic voyages to Funafuti, Ellice Islands. In May she took up air-sea rescue station at Johnston Island.

PC-1141 continued air-sea rescue station and patrol duties until April 1954. During this time she was alternately based at Johnston Island, Midway Island, Pearl Harbor, and Kwajalein Atoll in the Marshall Islands. On 10 April 1954 she was permanently based at Pearl Harbor to operate under the Commandant of the 14th Naval District for the remainder of her career in the United States Navy. Her primary duty was conducting training cruises for naval reservists among the Hawaiian Islands, and training cruises to Canton Island, Samoa; San Francisco, California, and Papeete, Tahiti, French Polynesia. PC-1141 was named Pierre (PC-1141) on 15 February 1956, after the capital of South Dakota.

Pierre was decommissioned at Pearl Harbor on 25 October 1958, and struck from the Navy List the same day. She was then transferred to the Government of Indonesia under terms of the Mutual Defense Assistance Program, and became KRI Tjakalang in the Indonesian Navy.
