= Paredes-Dodge House =

Historic house in St. Augustine, Florida

Coordinates: 29°53′46″N 81°18′48″W

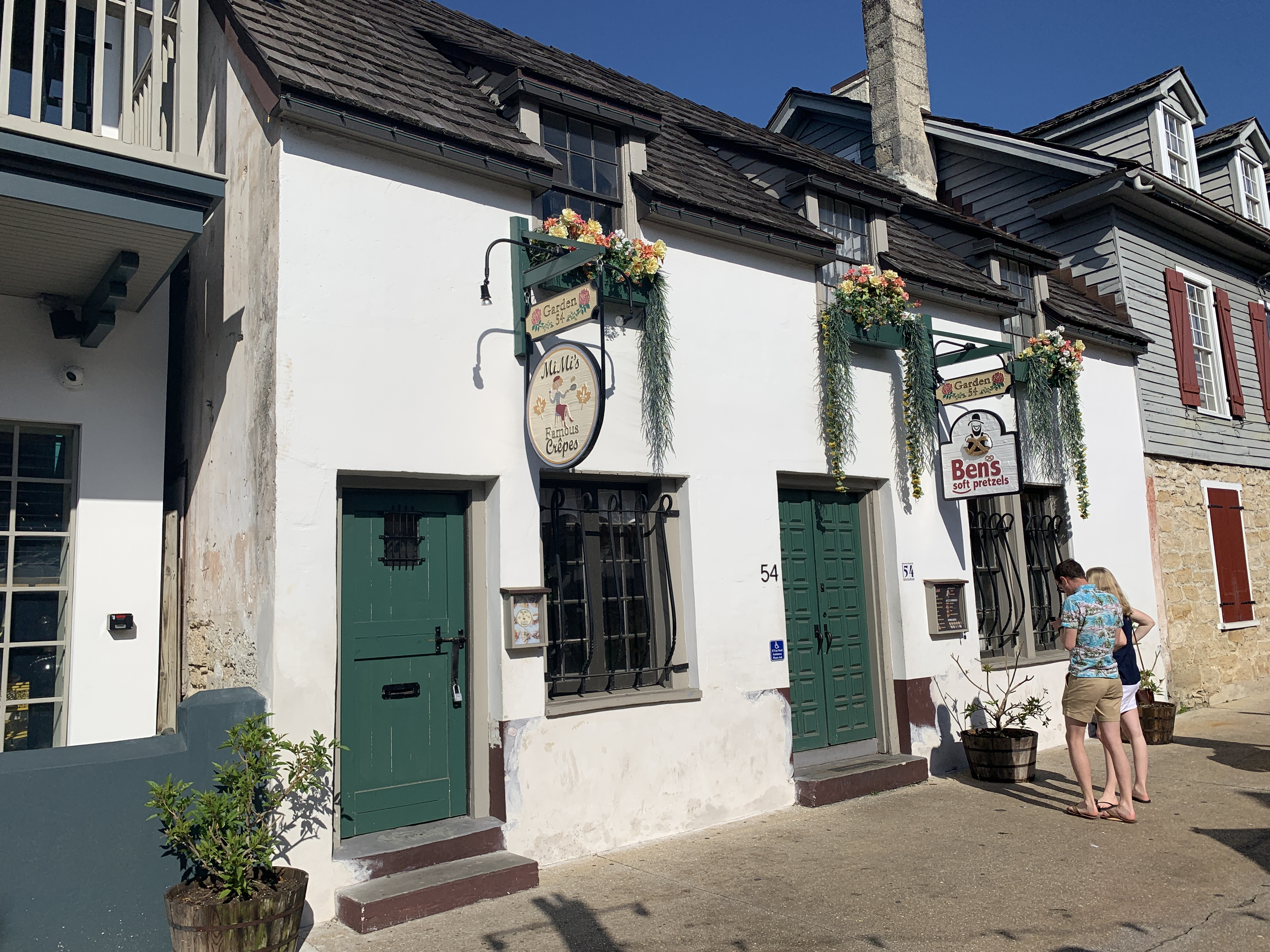
Paredes-Dodge House

The Paredes-Dodge House is located at 54 St. George Street in St. Augustine, Florida. The one and a half story structure was built between 1803 and 1813, and is one of the only surviving colonial structures in St. Augustine.

== History ==
=== First Spanish Period and British Period ===
The first known owner of the lot is Antonio Jose Rodriguez, as listed on Juan Josef Elixio de la Puente's 1764 map of St. Augustine. In the same year, St. Augustine was transferred from Spanish to British ownership, and Jesse Fish was charged with finding a buyer for the lot. He sold it, along with the adjacent Rodriguez-Avero-Sanchez house, to Joseph Dyason in 1768. Prior to the sale, there were two small tabby houses on the lot, but they were demolished before the sale was finalized.

=== Second Spanish Period to Flagler Era ===
When the Spanish regained control of Florida in 1783, Dyason's property was reclaimed by the Spanish crown and was under the stewardship of Governor Juan Quesada. He sold it to royal caulker Don Juan Sanchez in 1791, and when Sanchez died in 1803 his widow Maria sold the lot to Mallorcan sailor Juan Paredes. He began construction on the home that year. It is notable in that the home's north wall is flush with the wall of the neighboring Rodriguez-Avero-Sanchez house. Paredes lived in the home with his wife and daughter until his death in 1813. The property was then sold to Pedro Fucha, who only had it for a short time before he sold it to Esteban Arnau. The house remained in the Arnau family until they were foreclosed on by George Eastman in 1895.

=== 20th Century ===
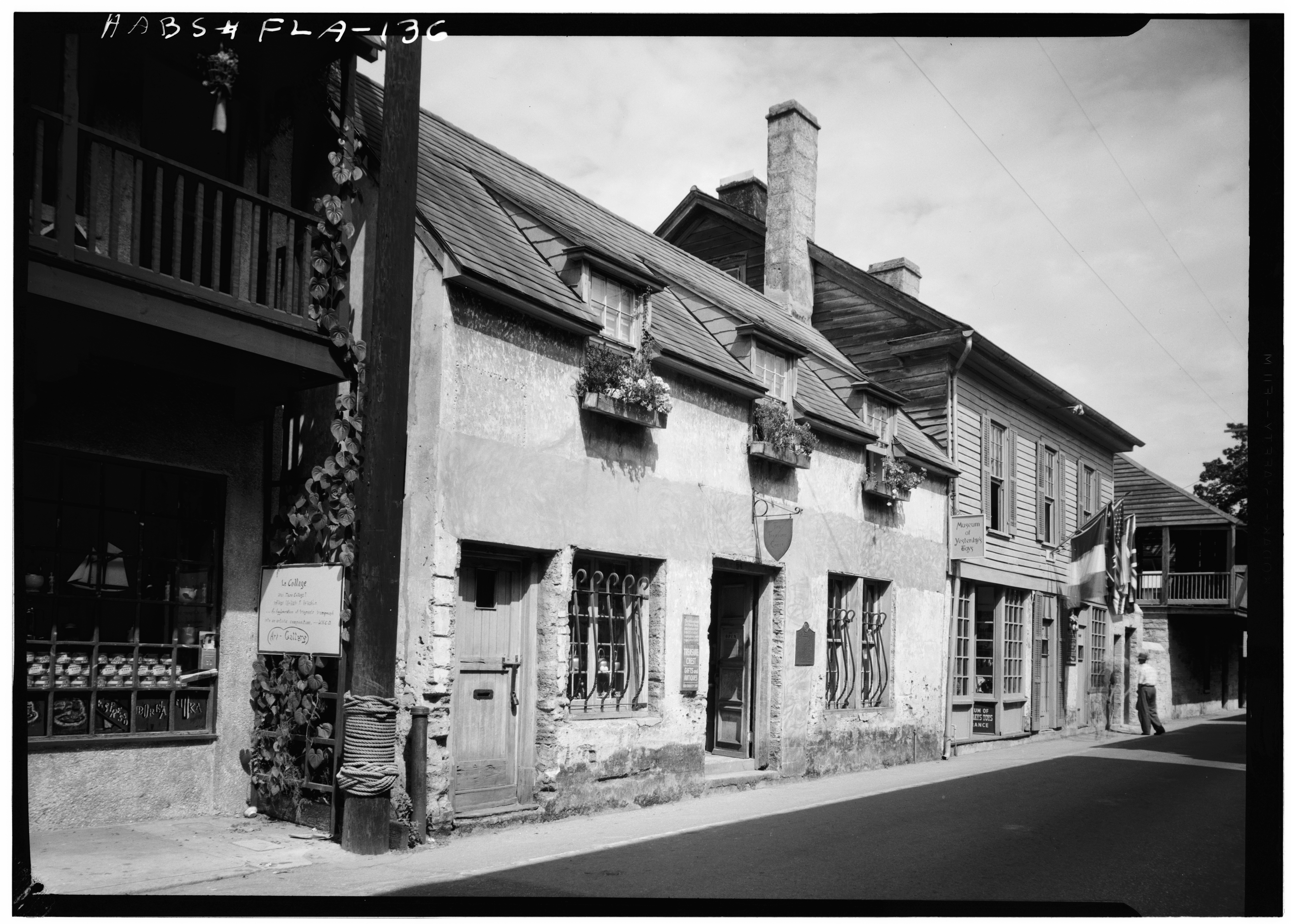
The house in August 1961

Jeweler James Dodge purchased the home in 1900. St. George Street had become primarily commercial property in the Flagler Era, and Dodge operated a jewelry store and curiosity shop out of the property. In the early 20th century, it was billed to tourists as The Oldest House in America and being built in 1565, though it was built much later. Dodge died in 1934 and his widow Emma sold the house to the St. Augustine Historical Society.

== Architecture ==
The Paredes-Dodge house is notably one of the only surviving colonial structures in St. Augustine. It represents many characteristic features of colonial Spanish architecture in St. Augustine, including being set directly onto the street and being built out of coquina and plastered in stucco. The original building was only two rooms and served as a private residence, but was added onto over the years to include two more rooms towards the back of the home. The Paredes-Dodge House shares a wall and a chimney with the Rodriguez-Avero-Sanchez house. A second entry door was added to the building in the late 1800s, probably to increase access to shoppers. The building was recorded by the Historic American Buildings Survey in ___.

== Restoration ==
The St. Augustine Historical Society acquired the property in 1934 and began efforts to preserve the building in the late 1940s. Structural beams were added to the interior and exterior, and a kitchen and bathroom were installed on the second floor. The Historical Society sold it to the Historic St. Augustine Preservation Board in 1988. When the Preservation Board was abolished in 1997, it became the property of the state.

== Present Day ==
Today the Paredes-Dodge House is owned by the State of Florida and managed on its behalf by UF Historic St. Augustine, Inc., a direct-support organization of the University of Florida. It is currently used as retail and restaurant space.
