= Arrivas House =

Historic house in Florida, US

Coordinates: 29.89630°N 81.31332°W

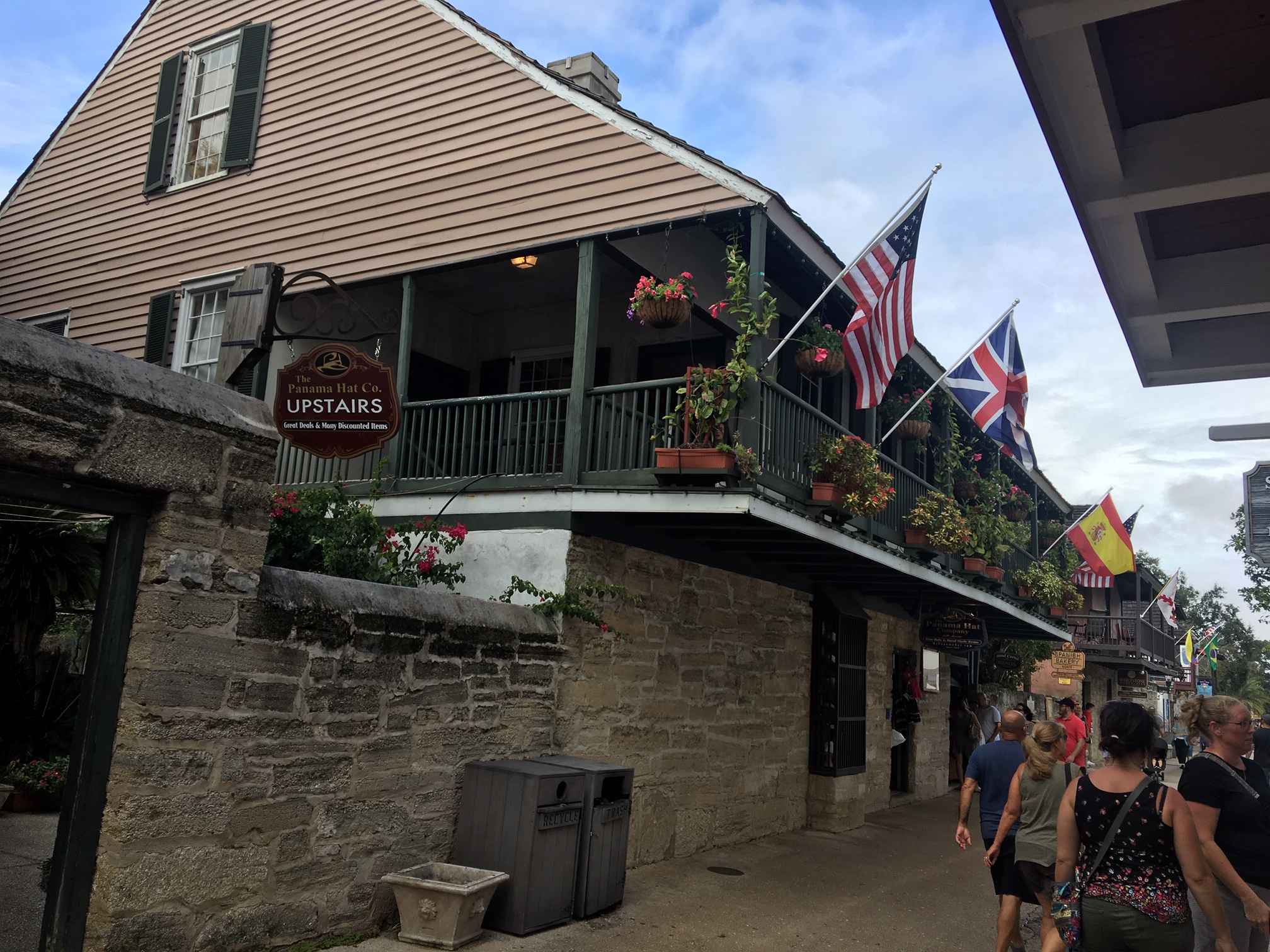
Arrivas House, 2018

The Arrivas House is located at 46 St. George Street, St. Augustine, Florida. It was the first completed restoration project of the Historic St. Augustine Preservation Board (HSAPB), and was named after early owner Don Raimundo de Arrivas.

== History ==
It is believed that the first building on this property dates back as early as 1650–1680, and was built of ripio, a shell concrete mixture. The original structure was replaced around 1725 with a building made of coquina. Don Raimundo de Arrivas is listed as the owner of the property on a 1764 map, which was created as an inventory of buildings that the Spanish compiled for the British when Florida became a colony of Great Britain.

During the British Period, the property was placed in the charge of a British agent, Jesse Fish. The property later reverted to the Arrivas heirs when Florida was regained by Spain in 1783. A 1788 map shows that the building had evolved into a large L-shaped masonry house, very similar to the structure that stands today. From 1824 until 1960 ownership changed over 20 times, with several architectural changes made, including the addition of a second story and balconies.

Paul Arnau, St. Augustine Collector of Customs and Superintendent of Lighthouses, was another notable resident of the Arrivas House. While St. Augustine was under Confederate control, he oversaw the darkening of the St. Augustine Lighthouse and removed its lighting apparatus. In November 1861, Arnau was elected mayor, a post he resigned when the Union took control of the town. He was imprisoned until lighting mechanisms, which he had stored in his home, were returned to the Union Navy.

== Historic St. Augustine Preservation Board ==
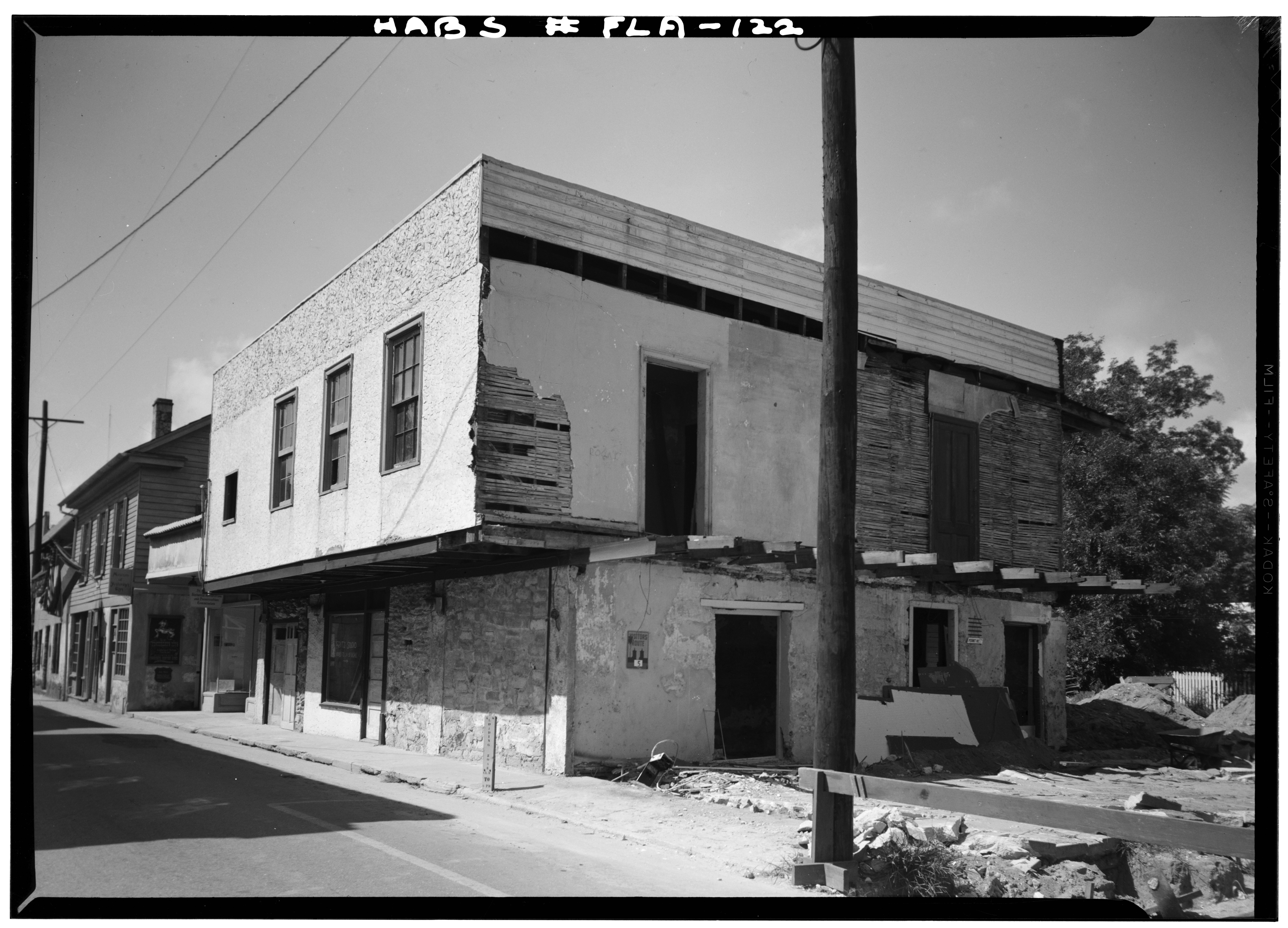
Arrivas House prior to HSAPB restoration

The Historic St. Augustine Preservation Board purchased the Arrivas House in July 1960 for $49,900, and set out to restore the structure to its Second Spanish Period appearance. It was the first restoration project they undertook in preparation for St. Augustine's 400th Anniversary celebration in 1965. Work began on the home in January 1961, and was formally dedicated on March 11, 1963. Then-Vice President Lyndon B. Johnson visited St. Augustine to mark the occasion, and gave a speech to the city from the Arrivas House balcony. It became an issue in the civil rights movement when a banquet afterwards at the elegant Ponce de Leon Hotel was planned for whites only (protests and negotiations resulted in a few Blacks being able to attend the banquet). During Johnson's visit, Senator George Smathers formally invited the Spanish government, represented by Spanish Ambassador Antonio Garrigues, to participate in St. Augustine's 400th anniversary celebrations.

The Arrivas House served as an interpreted historic site run by the Historic St. Augustine Preservation Board, where costumed docents demonstrated typical activities of Spanish colonial women. This included spinning, weaving, and candle making. In 1968, the Preservation Board acquired a loom that dated back to 1792 in Ohio. It was a gift from Van E. Marker of Tangerine, Florida. The loom was made of oak, maple, and black walnut and weighed almost 1,800 pounds. The Board put it to use at the Arrivas House. The second story briefly served as administrative offices for the Preservation Board.

The Arrivas House was documented as part of the Historic American Buildings Survey in 1960. Complete documentation is available on the Library of Congress's online catalog.

== Present day ==
Today, the Arrivas House is a commercial retail space, owned by the State of Florida and managed by University of Florida Historic St. Augustine, Inc. It is operated by The Panama Hat Company.
