= Lindsley House (St. Augustine, Florida) =

Historic house in Florida, United States

- U.S. National Register of Historic Places
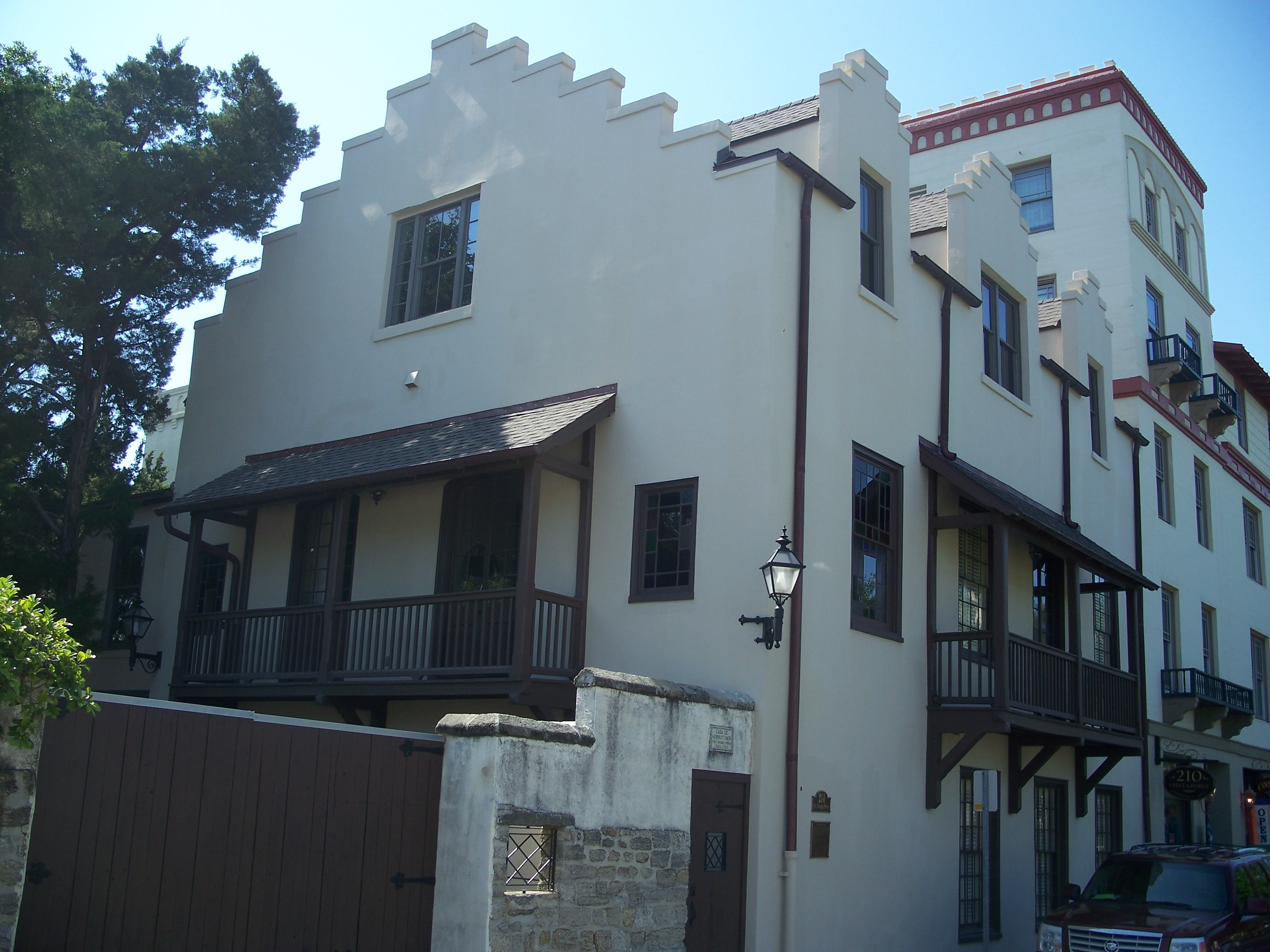

- Location within Florida Location within the United States
- Location: St. Augustine, Florida
- Coordinates: 29°53′30″N 81°18′48″W
- NRHP reference No.: 71001014
- Added to NRHP: September 10, 1971

The Lindsley House (also known as the Horruytiner House) is a historic home in St. Augustine, Florida. It is located at 214 St. George Street. On September 10, 1971, it was added to the U.S. National Register of Historic Places.

== Gallery ==
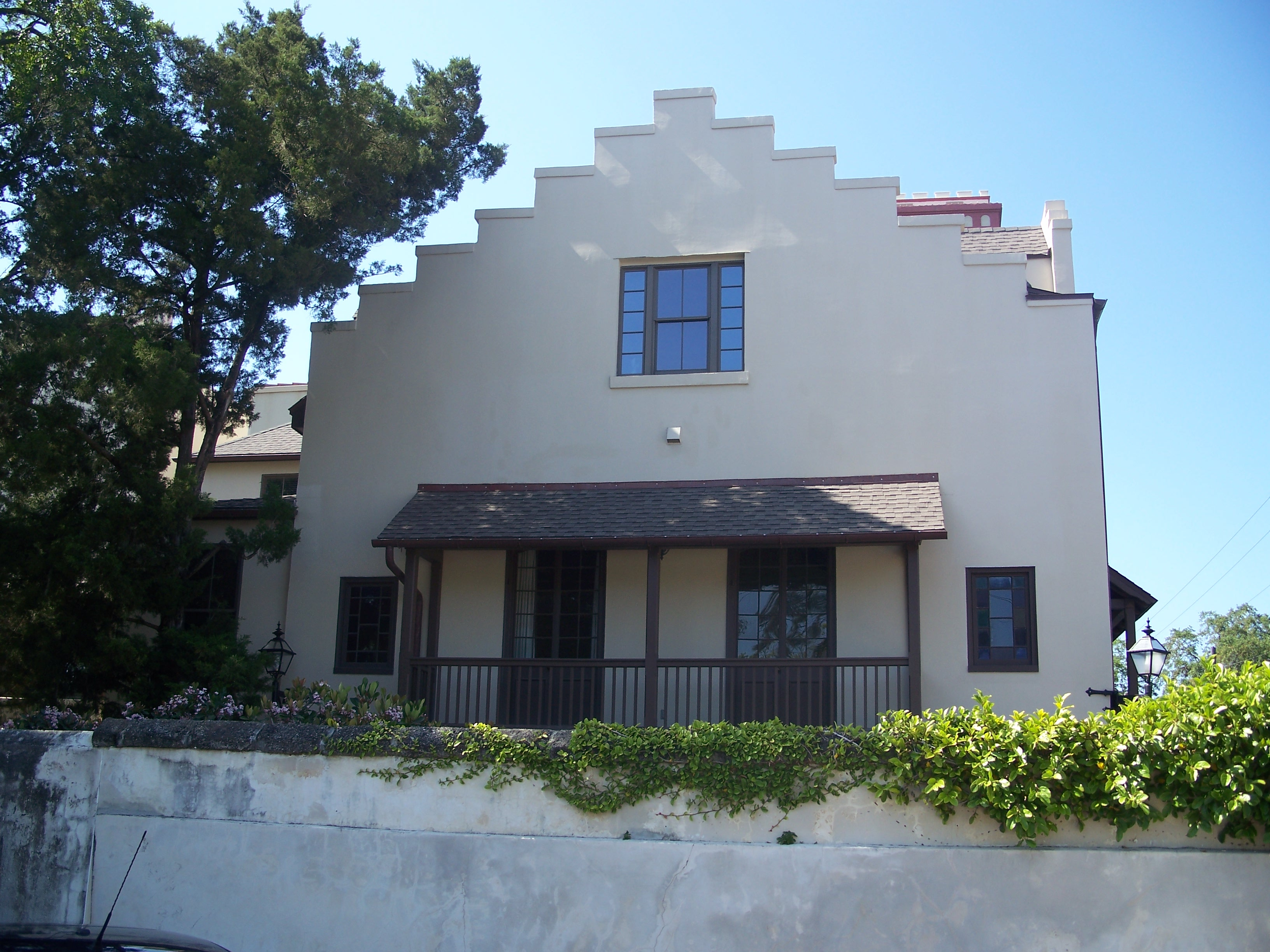

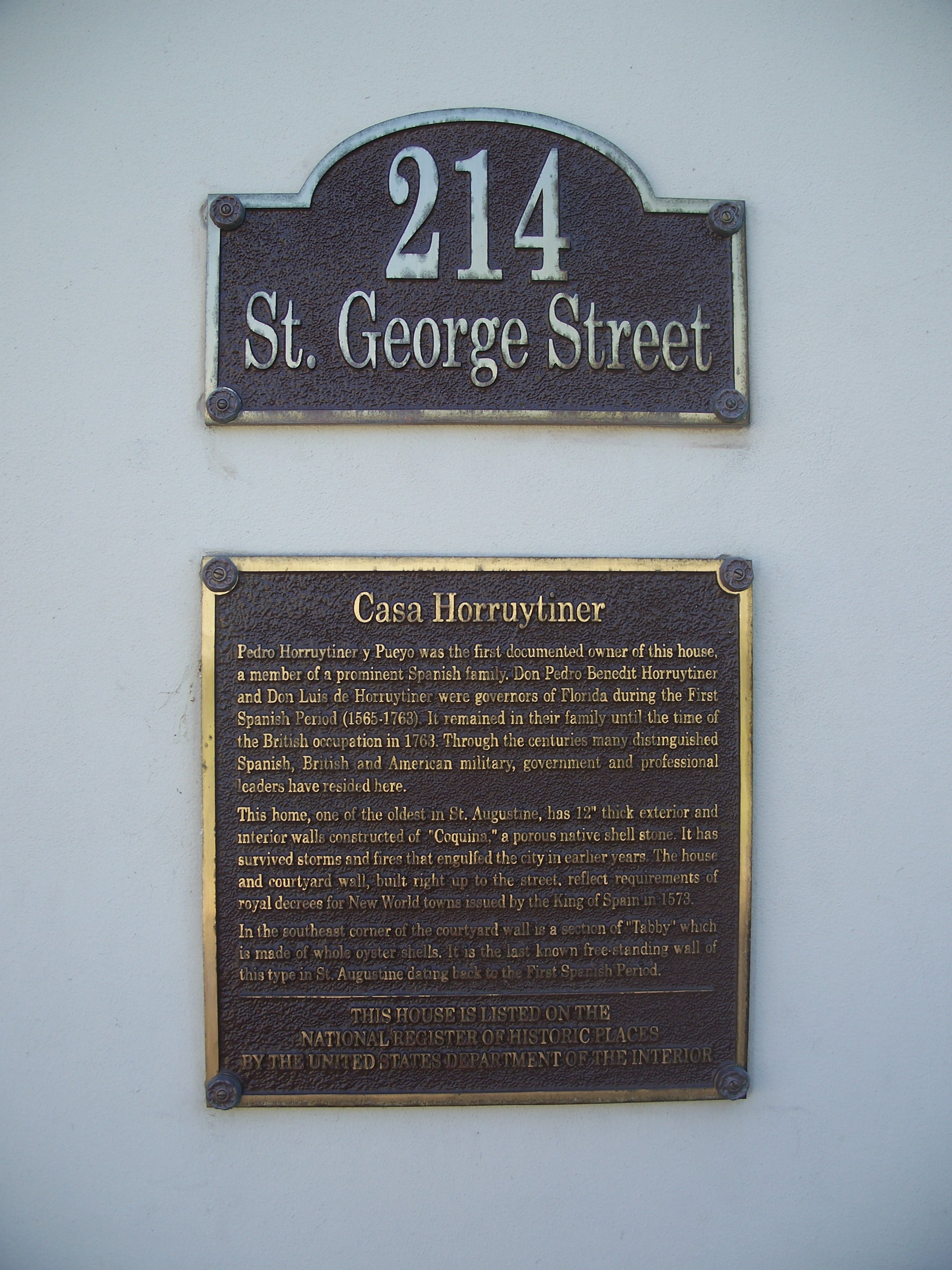

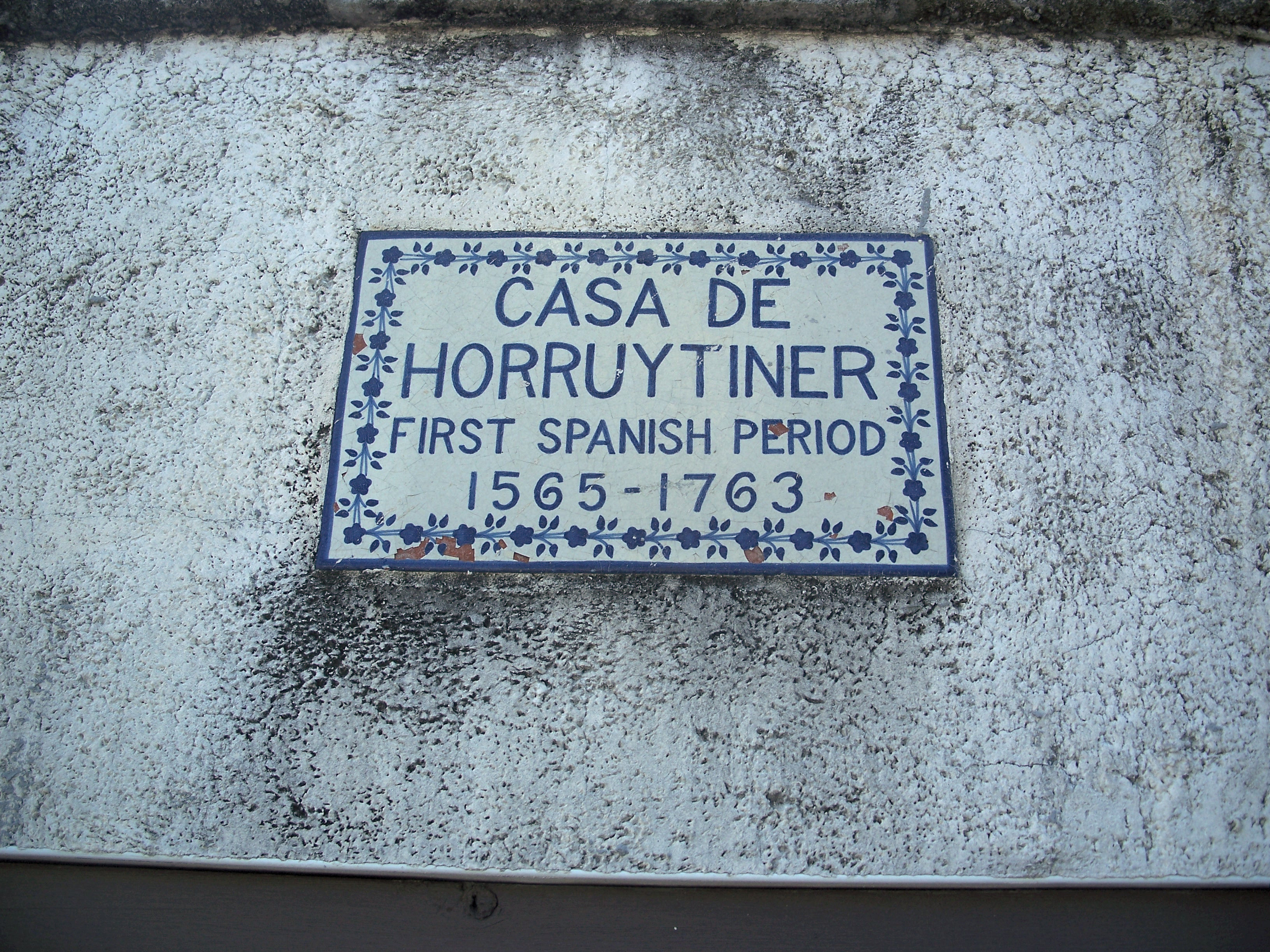
