= Merrill House (Florida) =

Museum in Jacksonville, Florida

Coordinates: 30.32613°N 81.64327°W

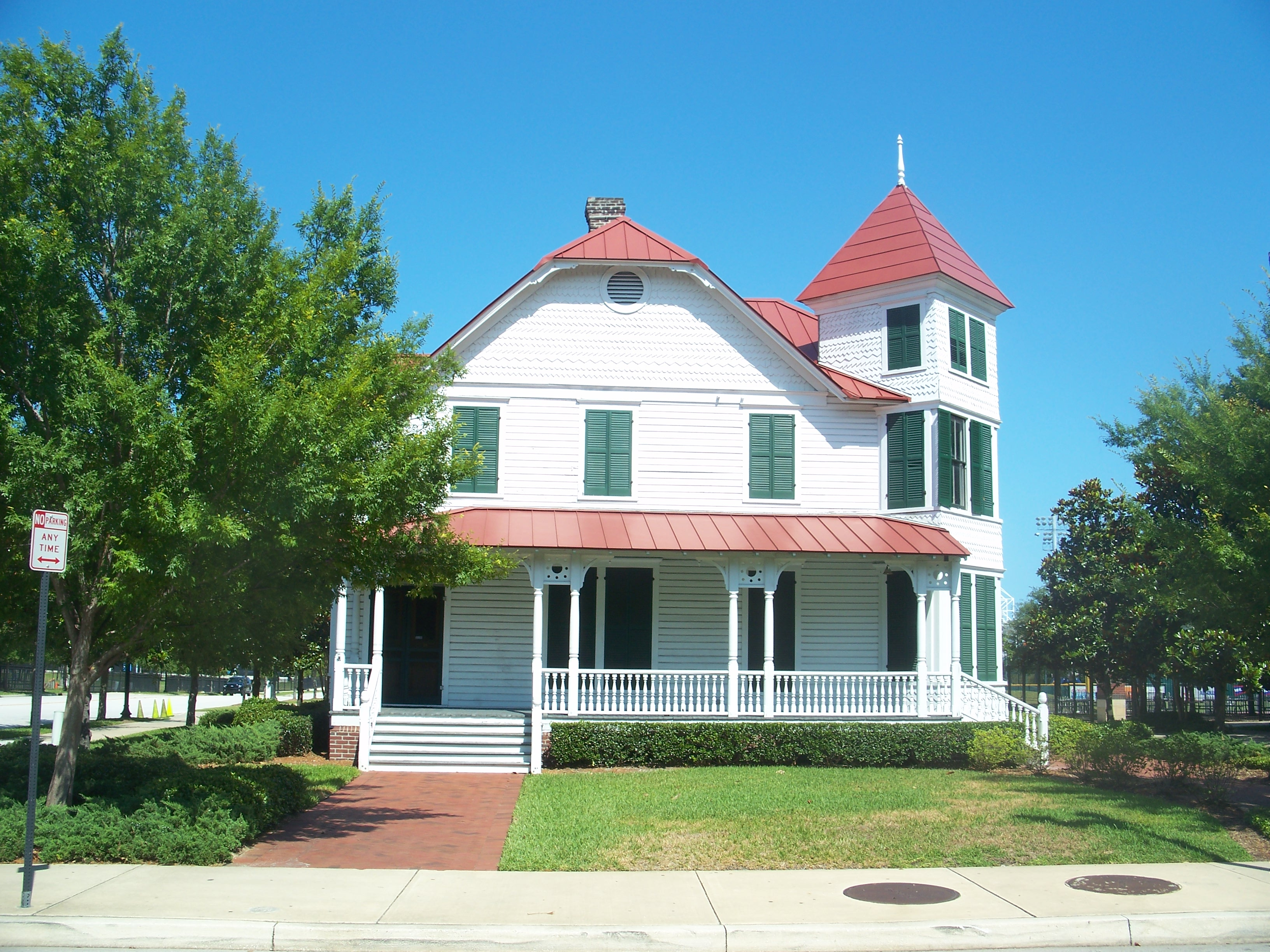

General information
- Architectural style: Victorian
- Completed: 1875

The Merrill House is a Victorian home operated by the Jacksonville Historical Society as a museum in Jacksonville, Florida. The home was built in 1879 at 229 Lafayette Street. It is in the Queen Anne style with Eastlake architecture features. In 2000, the house was designated a local historic landmark.

It exemplifies the Queen Anne style, with a square tower on the southwest corner and an elaborate bargeboard in the north gable. The porch posts, brackets, and spindles reflect the Eastlake style.

== History ==
The Merrill family lived in the house from 1879 to 1920. In 1920, the house was sold to Alfred Leach, whose son George sold the house to the city of Jacksonville in 1999. By the 1990s, the house was abandoned and in poor condition. The city acquired the house in its preparations to build the Vystar Veterans Arena. Instead of demolishing the house, the city gave the house to the Jacksonville Historical Society, who then moved the house in 2000 to 317 A Philip Randolph Blvd. In 2002, it was moved again to make space for the 121 Financial Ballpark. In 2006, the Historical Society completed its restorations. The house was restored to reflect the early 1900s.

== Gallery ==
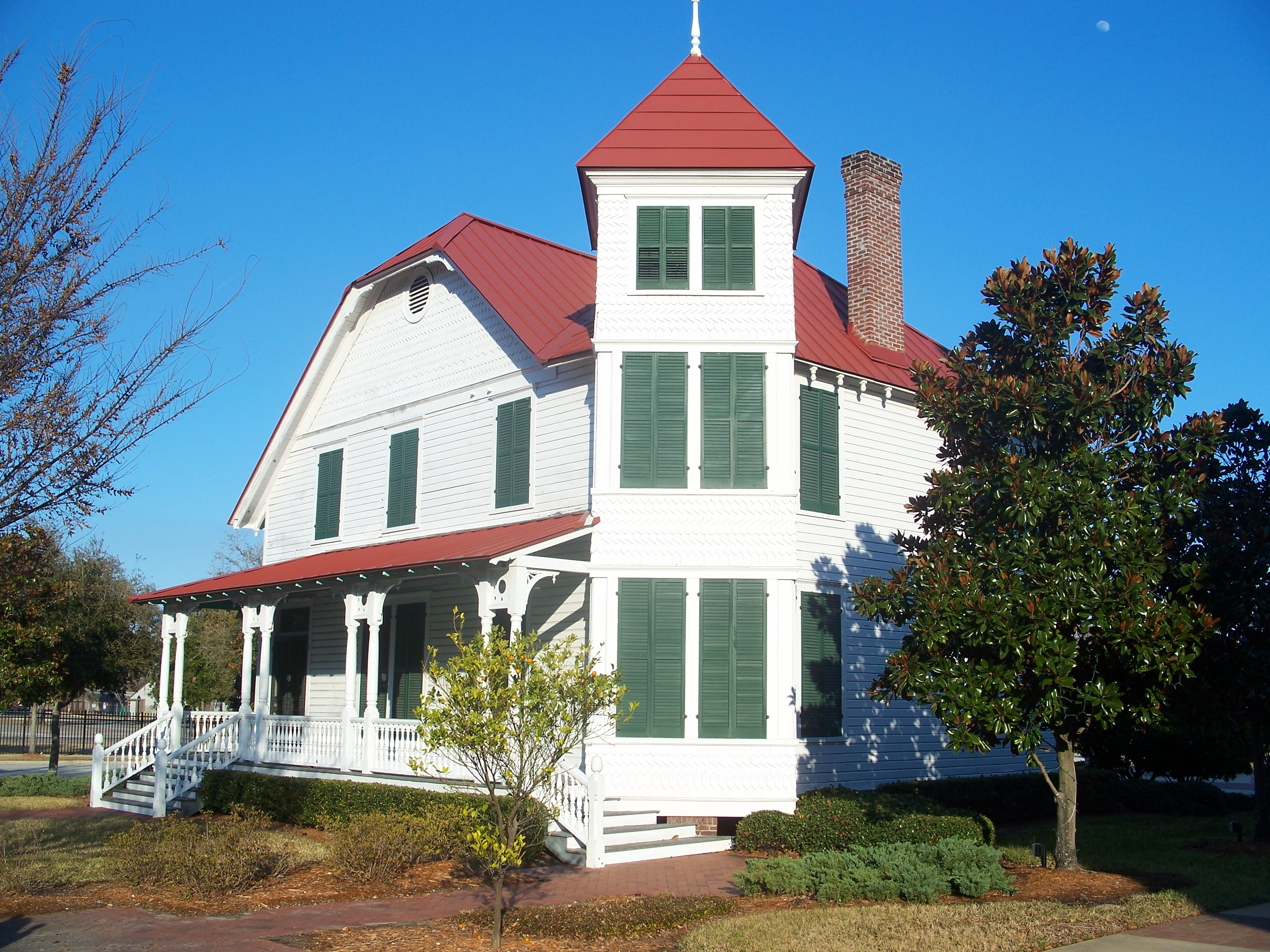

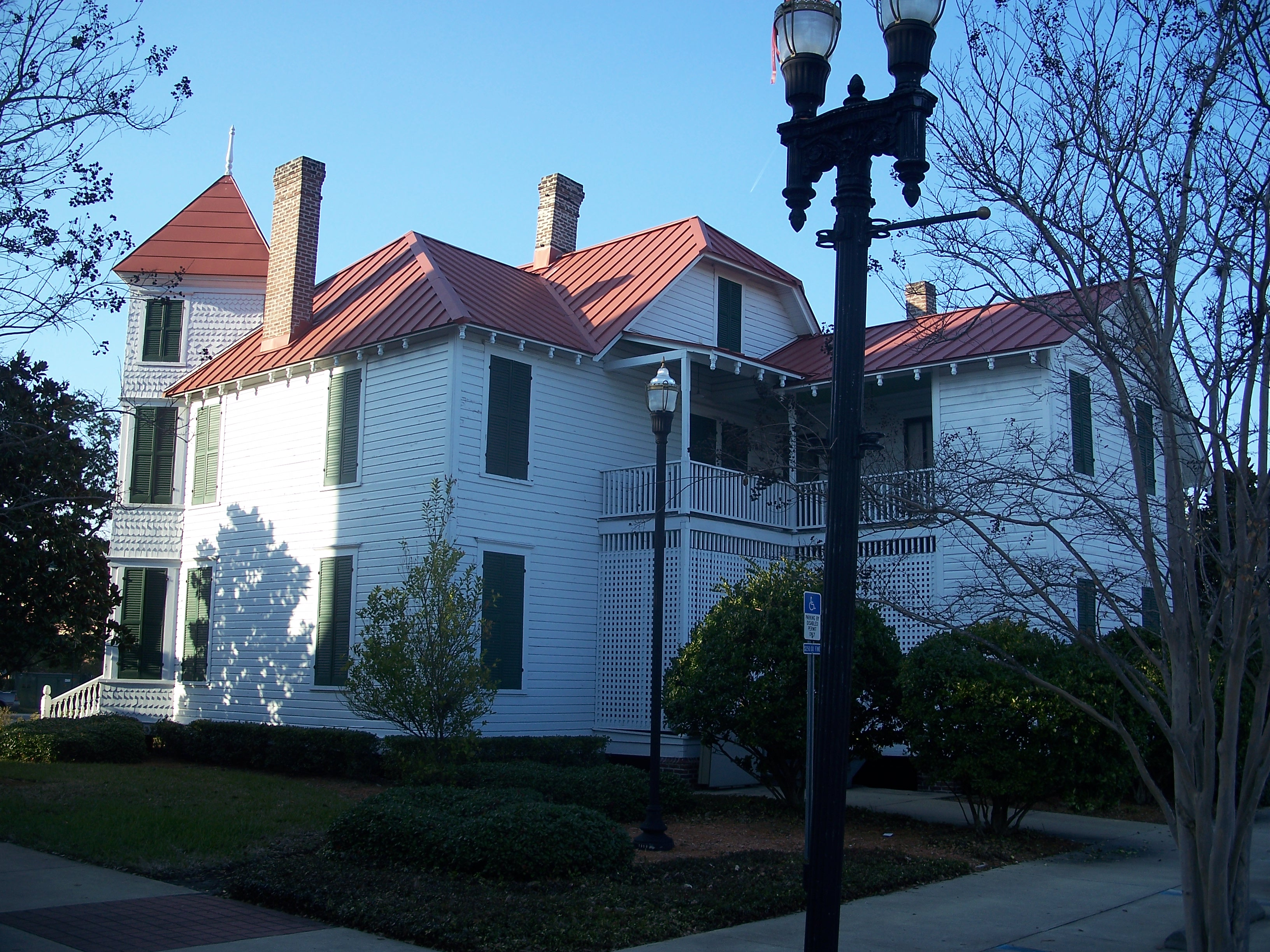

== See also ==
- List of museums in Florida
