= U.S. Route 17 =

Highway in the Eastern United States

U.S. Route 17
- Coastal Highway
- US 17 highlighted in red

Route information
- Length: 1,206.47 mi (1,941.63 km)
- Existed: 1926–present

Major junctions
- South end: US 41 in Punta Gorda, FL
- I-75 in Solana, FL; I-4 in Orlando, FL; I-10 / I-95 in Jacksonville, FL; I-16 in Savannah, GA; I-26 in Charleston, SC; I-64 at Newport News, VA; I-95 (multiple times); I-66 near Warrenton, VA; I-81 at Winchester, VA
- North end: US 11 / US 50 / US 522 in Winchester, VA

Location
- Country: United States
- States: Florida, Georgia, South Carolina, North Carolina, Virginia

Highway system
- United States Numbered Highway System; List; Special; Divided
← US 16	→ US 18

U.S. Route 17, U.S. Highway 17, or US 17, also known as the Coastal Highway, is a north–south United States Numbered Highway that spans in the Southeastern United States. It runs close to the Atlantic Coast for much of its length, with the exception of the portion between Punta Gorda and Jacksonville, Florida, and the portion from Fredericksburg to Winchester, Virginia, both of which follow a more inland route. Major metropolitan areas served along US 17's route include the Punta Gorda, Greater Orlando, and Jacksonville metropolitan areas in Florida, the Brunswick and Savannah metropolitan areas in Georgia, the Charleston and Myrtle Beach metropolitan areas in South Carolina, the Cape Fear and New Bern metropolitan areas in North Carolina, and the Hampton Roads and Winchester metropolitan areas in Virginia.

The highway's southern terminus is in Punta Gorda, Florida, at an intersection with US 41. Traveling north, US 17 joins up with US 50 in Paris, Virginia, and the northern terminus of US 17 is in downtown Winchester. This is also the point at which the portion of US 50 called the Northwestern Turnpike begins.

Though US 1 is generally considered to be the highway that runs alongside Interstate 95 (I-95), US 17 runs parallel to I-95 for much of its extent and even shares the same physical road for short spans in Fredericksburg, Virginia, and Ridgeland, South Carolina. As such, US 17 is out of sequence in the U.S. Highway numbering plan (US 17 would, under the plan, run parallel to and between US 15 and US 19; the U.S. Highway following that path is instead marked US 219).

== Route description ==
Lengths
	mi	km
FL	317	510
GA	124	200
SC	221	356
NC	286	460
VA	256	412
Total	1,204	1,938

=== Florida ===
US 17 begins in downtown Punta Gorda at US 41 (Cross Street), just to the west of the Tamiami Trail. After running east, it runs roughly north along the Peace River, through Arcadia, Zolfo Springs (where it crosses the Peace River), and Wauchula. At Fort Meade, it joins with US 98, which follows it northward (westward on US 98) until Bartow. While US 98 goes northwest, US 17 goes northeast.

US 17 begins a long concurrency with US 92 just north of Winter Haven in Lake Alfred (US 92 following eastbound), which takes both highways through Kissimmee, where they join US 192. Like US 92, US 17 roughly parallels I-4 along the overlap. When all three meet US 441, US 192 follows US 441 southbound, while US 17/US 92 follows US 441 north into downtown Orlando. US 17/US 92 then splits from US 441 at State Road 50 (SR 50, Colonial Drive) and jogs east, splitting back north from SR 50 when it meets SR 15 (Mills Avenue).

In Sanford, US 17/US 92 crosses the St. Johns River into Volusia County via the Bill Benedict Bridge.

US 92 then splits away from US 17 north of DeLand, as US 92 continues east to Daytona Beach on International Speedway Boulevard, while US 17 continues north toward Palatka, where it again crosses the St. Johns River.

In Clay County, US 17 runs through suburban Jacksonville. The northern stretch of US 17 in Clay County is known as Park Avenue.

In Jacksonville, the southern portion of US 17 is known as Roosevelt Boulevard. Here, the highway goes past Naval Air Station Jacksonville (NAS Jax). Near downtown Jacksonville, US 17 joins I-10 for approximately one mile (1.6 km), before merging into I-95. US 17 then exits onto Union Street and continues as North Main Street until the Nassau County border. It then continues until it reaches the Georgia state line, crossing over the St. Marys River.

=== Georgia ===
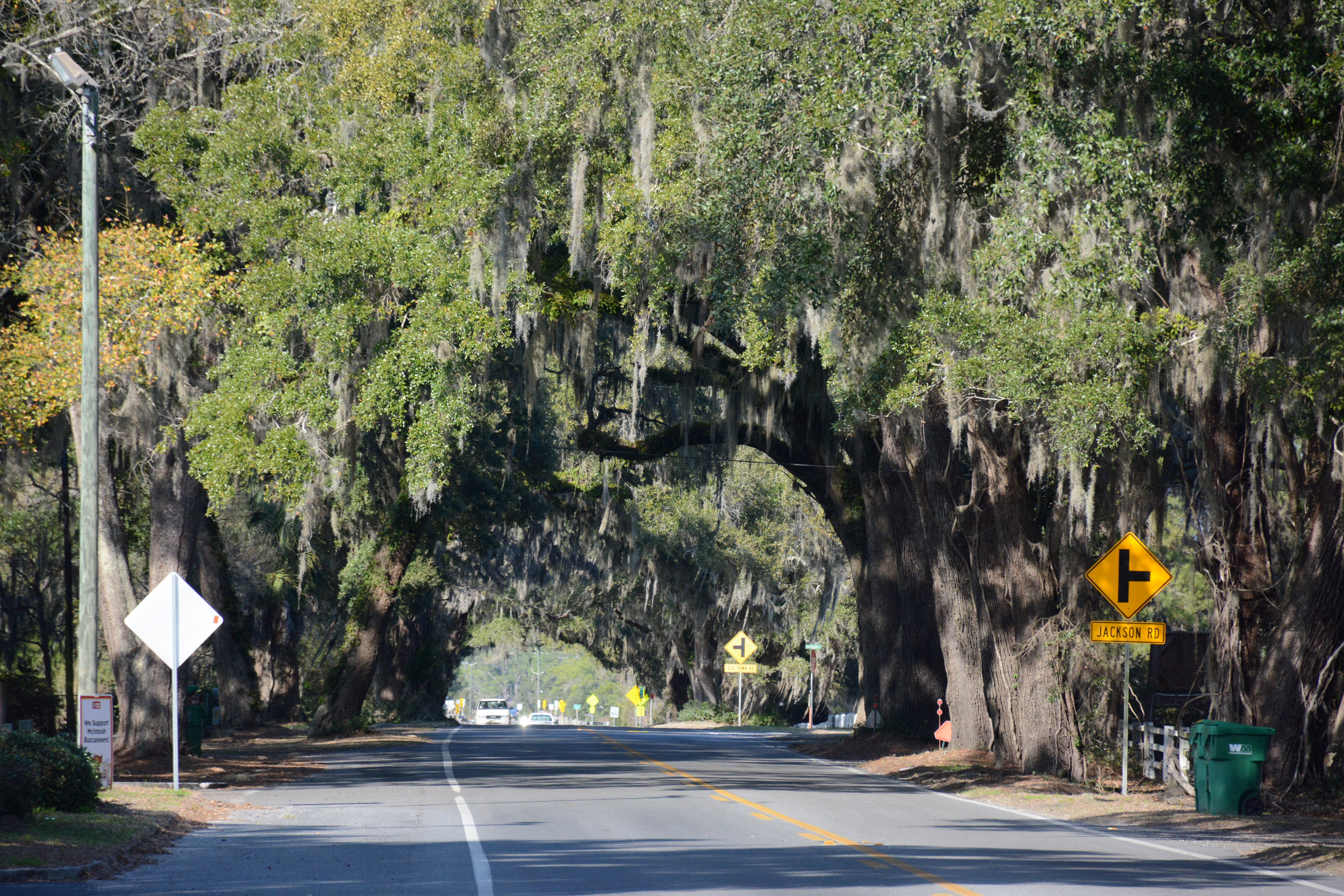
A canopy of oak trees over a section of US 17 in McIntosh County, Georgia

In Woodbine, US 17 crosses the Satilla River by way of the J. Edwin Godley Bridge. In Brunswick, the route traverses the South Brunswick River over the Sidney Lanier Bridge, then across the Altamaha River bridge between Glynn and McIntosh counties. At the South Carolina state line, US 17 crosses the Savannah River on the Talmadge Memorial Bridge.

=== South Carolina ===
US 17 enters South Carolina in Jasper County as a two-lane road and within eight miles (13 km) enters Hardeeville, where it becomes a four-lane configuration. US 17 intersects I-95 in Hardeeville and runs parallel to I-95 until Ridgeland, where it merges with the Interstate until Point South. At Point South, US 17 leaves I-95 and heads eastward into northern Beaufort County, sharing a concurrency with US 21 until Gardens Corner. US 21 splits off to Beaufort while US 17 heads northeast into the ACE Basin and Colleton County. This stretch of road has been upgraded from a two-lane to a four-lane configuration, due to safety concerns.

Once in Jacksonboro, the road enters Charleston County, crossing the Edisto River and maintains a four-lane configuration for the remainder of the state. The road passes through several rural communities as it approaches Charleston from the west. In Charleston, the 3.6-mile (5.8 km) section running from South Carolina Highway 171 (SC 171) to Sam Rittenberg Boulevard has been named the "Charleston Nine Memorial Highway", in honor of nine Charleston firefighters killed in the line of duty in the Charleston Sofa Super Store fire on June 18, 2007. US 17 passes through the West Ashley community before it traverses the Ashley River Drawbridges to the Charleston Peninsula. From the drawbridges, it is known as the Septima Clark Crosstown Connector and is mostly routed north of the affluent historical areas of the city. Upon reaching the I-26 terminus, US 17 becomes limited-access and above grade as it approaches the Cooper River via the Arthur Ravenel Jr. Bridge. The stretch of US 17 in Charleston is infamous among locals for its traffic congestion, especially on weekday mornings.

Upon crossing the river, the highway enters Mount Pleasant at grade and is signalized for several miles up through the second interchange with I-526 and connecting roads to the Isle of Palms and Sullivan's Island. The road leaves the Charleston metro area and enters the Francis Marion National Forest and going through the rural communities of Awendaw and McClellanville, where Hurricane Hugo made landfall in September 1989. US 17 continues on its northeastern journey to Georgetown and crosses the marsh-lined Santee River as it enters Georgetown County. US 17's route through Georgetown is a major thoroughfare through the city and skirts the historic district. After going through Georgetown and passing by DeBordieu Colony, Pawleys Island, Litchfield Beach, and Murrells Inlet, where it splits between a business route and the mainline route, which remains west of the beach and tourist areas served by US 17 Business. US 17 enters Horry County, passes Garden City Beach and Surfside Beach, and bypasses Myrtle Beach. The roads rejoin north of the city and continue as US 17 through Atlantic Beach, North Myrtle Beach, and Little River before crossing into North Carolina.

=== North Carolina ===
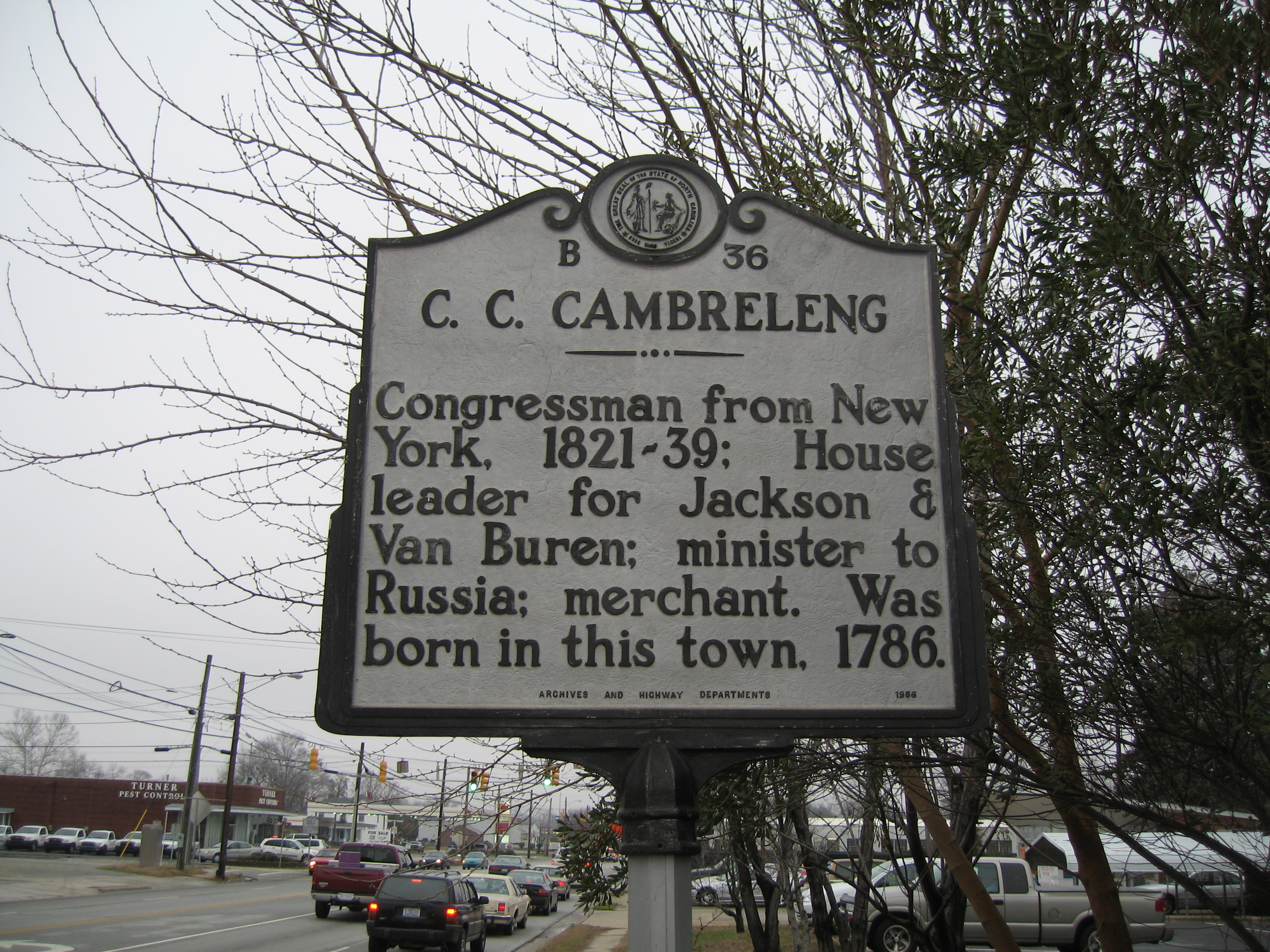
Historical marker on US 17

In Wilmington, US 17 (here concurrent with I-140) crosses the Northeast Cape Fear River between New Hanover and Brunswick counties over the Dan Cameron Bridge. Between New Bern and James City, US 17 (concurrent with US 70 and North Carolina Highway 55, or NC 55) crosses the Trent River by way of the Freedom Memorial Bridge. Farther east, between James City and Bridgeton, US 17, still concurrent with NC 55, crosses the Neuse River over the Neuse River Bridge.

In Washington, US 17 crosses the Pamlico River over the Pamlico-Tar River Bridge. Farther along, in Williamston, US 17 (concurrent with US 13) crosses the Roanoke River, then the Cashie River at Windsor. At the Bertie County–Chowan county line, US 17 traverses the Chowan River on the Chowan River Bridge, one of the longest bridges along US 17's route. In Perquimans County, US 17 (here concurrent with NC 37) crosses the Yeopim River and the Perquimans River at Hertford. Crossing into Pasquotank County over the Little River, US 17 enters Elizabeth City and begins a short concurrency with US 158. At Morgan's Corner, the US 158 concurrency ends, and US 17 crosses the Pasquotank River into Camden County before heading north into Virginia.

=== Virginia ===
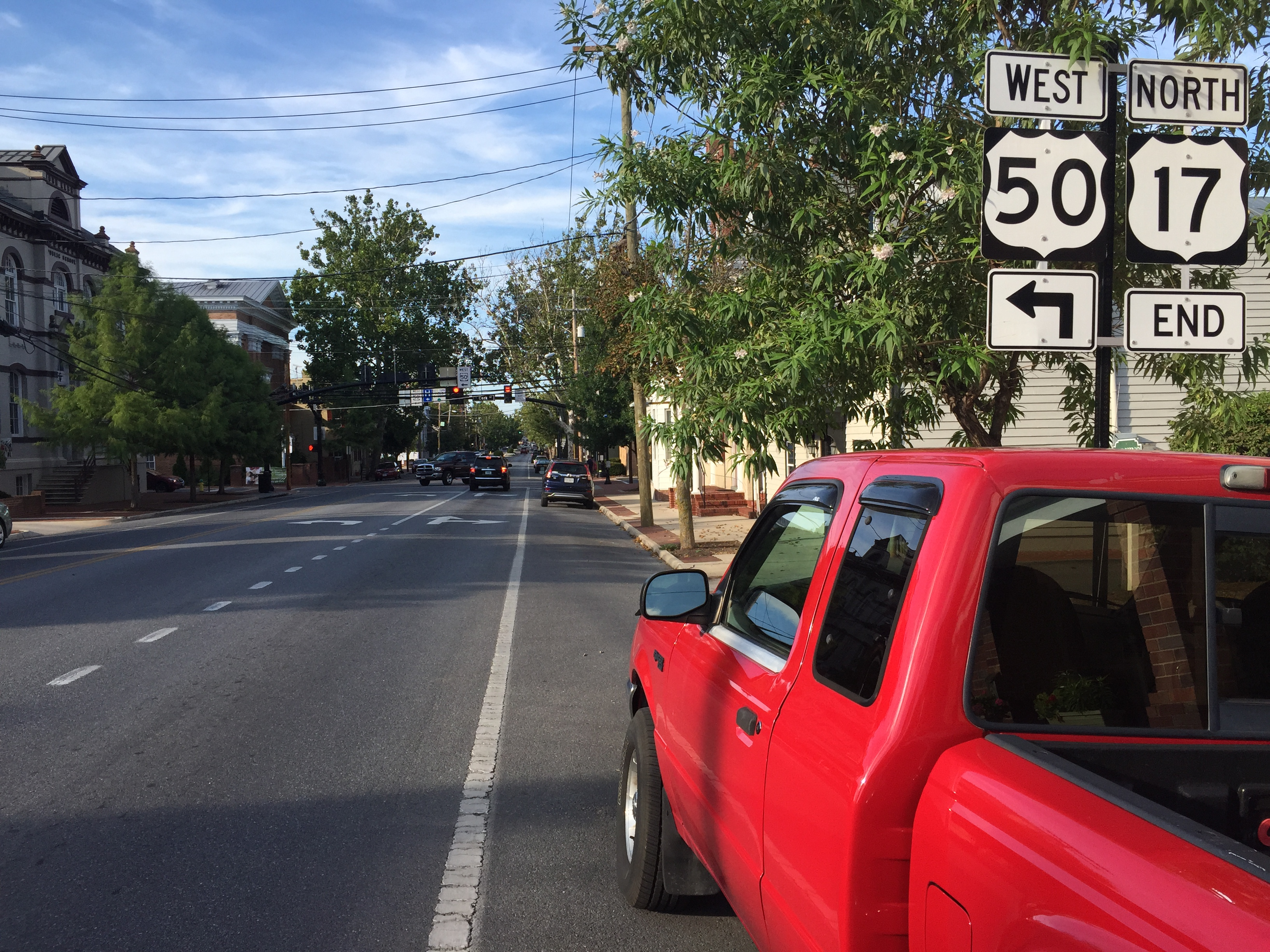
View north along US 11, US 522, and west along US 50 (Cameron Street) at the northern terminus of US 17 in Winchester, Virginia

US 17 enters Virginia into the city of Chesapeake, running along the border of the Great Dismal Swamp. It runs through more of the city of Chesapeake and around the cities of Portsmouth and Norfolk before it crosses the James River between Newport News and Isle of Wight County on the James River Bridge concurrent with US 258. The route also crosses the York River between Gloucester and York counties at Yorktown on the George P. Coleman Memorial Bridge. Finally, US 17 traverses the Rappahannock River between Stafford and Spotsylvania counties at Fredericksburg as it overlaps I-95. Then it traverses the Blue Ridge Mountains through Fauquier County and crosses the town of Warrenton. It then merges with I-66 in Marshall and runs concurrently until Delaplane. The highway terminates at a junction with US 11, US 50 and US 522 in Winchester.

== History ==
=== Florida ===
A US 17 shield used in Florida prior to 1993

From 1956 until 1993, US 17 signs in Florida featured black numbering on a yellow shield. The color coding of U.S. Highways by the Florida Department of Transportation was stopped when the state could only use federal funding for standard black-and-white; a few yellow US 17 signs remain.

=== South Carolina ===
US 17 has had slight variations over its history in South Carolina. US 17 once traversed the Cooper River on the John P. Grace and Silas N. Pearman memorial bridges before the Arthur Ravenel Jr. Bridge replaced both in 2005. US 17, first paved in 1940 and known as Kings Highway (named for the historic route), also ran through downtown Myrtle Beach before the new bypass route was finished in the early 1980’s to alleviate heavy traffic. US 17 Alternate was commissioned as a route between Point South and Georgetown, mostly for trucks who wished to bypass Charleston and the weight restrictions of the former bridges.

=== Hurricane Charley Highway ===
On August 13, 2004, Hurricane Charley made landfall near the southern terminus of US 17 at Punta Gorda. The hurricane threatened to hit much of the highway, affecting the route in Florida from Punta Gorda to north of Orlando (when Charley followed the route of I-4 out to sea). The Georgia stretch of US 17 was not hit but was under a hurricane warning. When Charley made landfall again in South Carolina, its trail through Virginia was close to US 17.

== Major intersections ==
Florida
US 41 in Punta Gorda.
I-75 on the Solana–Cleveland city line
US 98 in Fort Meade. The highways travel concurrently to Bartow.
US 92 in Lake Alfred. The highways travel concurrently to DeLand.
US 27 in Haines City
US 192 in Kissimmee. The highways travel concurrently through the city.
US 192 / US 441 in Kissimmee. US 17/US 441 travel concurrently to Orlando.
I-4 in Orlando
I-4 in Orlando
I-4 northwest of Sanford
I-295 in Jacksonville
I-10 in Jacksonville. The highways travel concurrently through the city.
I-95 in Jacksonville. The highways travel concurrently through the city.
I-95 / US 23 in Jacksonville. US 17/US 23 travel concurrently through the city.
US 1 / US 23 in Jacksonville. US 1/US 17 travel concurrently through the city.
I-295 in Jacksonville
I-95 in Yulee
Georgia
US 82 west of Brunswick. The highways travel concurrently for approximately 0.72 miles (1.16 km).
I-95 / US 82 west of Brunswick
US 341 in Brunswick
US 25 in Brunswick
I-95 south-southeast of Riceboro
US 84 in Midway
I-95 in Richmond Hill
I-516 / US 80 in Savannah. The highways travel concurrently through the city.
I-16 / I-516 / US 80 in Savannah. I-16/US 17 travel concurrently through the city.
South Carolina
I-95 in Hardeeville
US 321 in Hardeeville
US 278 in Hardeeville. The highways travel concurrently to Ridgeland.
I-95 in Ridgeland. The highways travel concurrently to Point South.
US 21 northeast of Pocotaligo. The highways travel concurrently to Gardens Corner.
I-526 in Charleston
I-26 in Charleston. The highways travel concurrently, on separate lanes, through the city.
US 78 in Charleston
US 52 in Charleston
I-526 in Mount Pleasant
US 521 in Georgetown
US 701 in Georgetown
US 501 in Myrtle Beach
North Carolina
I-140 southwest of Leland
US 74 / US 76 in Leland. US 17/US 74 travel concurrently to west of Wilmington. US 17/US 76 travel concurrently to west of Wrightsville Beach.
US 74 / US 421 west of Wilmington. US 17/US 421 travel concurrently to downtown Wilmington.
US 421 in Wilmington
US 117 in Wilmington
US 74 / US 76 in Wilmington west of Wrightsville Beach
NC 140 in Kirkland
US 70 west of New Bern. The highways travel concurrently to the New Bern–James City city line.
US 264 in Washington
US 13 / US 64 south-southwest of Williamston. US 13/US 17 travel concurrently to Windsor. US 17/US 64 travel concurrently to south of Williamston.
US 158 in Elizabeth City. The highways travel concurrently to southeast of Morgans Corner.
Virginia
I-64 / I-464 in Chesapeake. I-64/US 17 travel concurrently through the city.
US 13 / US 460 in Chesapeake
I-264 in Portsmouth
US 58 in Portsmouth
I-664 in Suffolk
US 258 in Bartlett. The highways travel concurrently to Newport News.
US 60 in Newport News
I-64 in Newport News
US 360 in Brays Fork. The highways travel concurrently to Tappahannock.
US 301 in Port Royal Cross Roads
US 1 south of Fredericksburg. The highways travel concurrently for approximately 1.18 miles (1.90 km).
I-95 south of Fredericksburg. I-95/US 17 travel concurrently to northwest of Falmouth.
US 15 / US 29 in Opal. The highways travel concurrently to Warrenton.
I-66 southeast of Marshall. The highways travel concurrently for approximately 4.69 miles (7.55 km).
US 50 southeast of Paris. The highways travel concurrently to Winchester.
US 340 in Waterloo
I-81 / US 522 southeast of Winchester. US 17/US 522 travel concurrently to Winchester.
US 11 in Winchester. The highways travel concurrently through the city.

== See also ==
- Interstate 74
- Interstate 73

=== Related routes ===
- U.S. Route 17-1
- U.S. Route 117
- U.S. Route 92

=== Special routes ===
- U.S. Route 17 Alternate from Georgetown, South Carolina to Pocotaligo, South Carolina
- U.S. Route 17 Alternate in Jacksonville, Florida (1951–1955)
- U.S. Route 17 Alternate in Jacksonville, Florida (c. 1960s−2007)
- U.S. Route 17 Alternate in Savannah, Georgia
- U.S. Route 17 Business in Fredericksburg, Virginia
- U.S. Route 17 Business in Elizabeth City, North Carolina
- U.S. Route 17 Bypass near Elizabeth City, North Carolina
- U.S. Route 17 Bypass in Myrtle Beach, South Carolina
- U.S. Route 17 Business Truck in Elizabeth City, North Carolina
- U.S. Route 17 Business in Jacksonville, North Carolina
- U.S. Route 17 Business in Wilmington, North Carolina
- U.S. Route 17 Business near Bolivia, North Carolina
- U.S. Route 17 Business in Shallotte, North Carolina
- U.S. Route 17 Business in Williamston, North Carolina
- U.S. Route 17 Business in Myrtle Beach, South Carolina
- U.S. Route 17 Truck in Kissimmee, Florida
- U.S. Route 17 Truck in Winter Park, Florida
