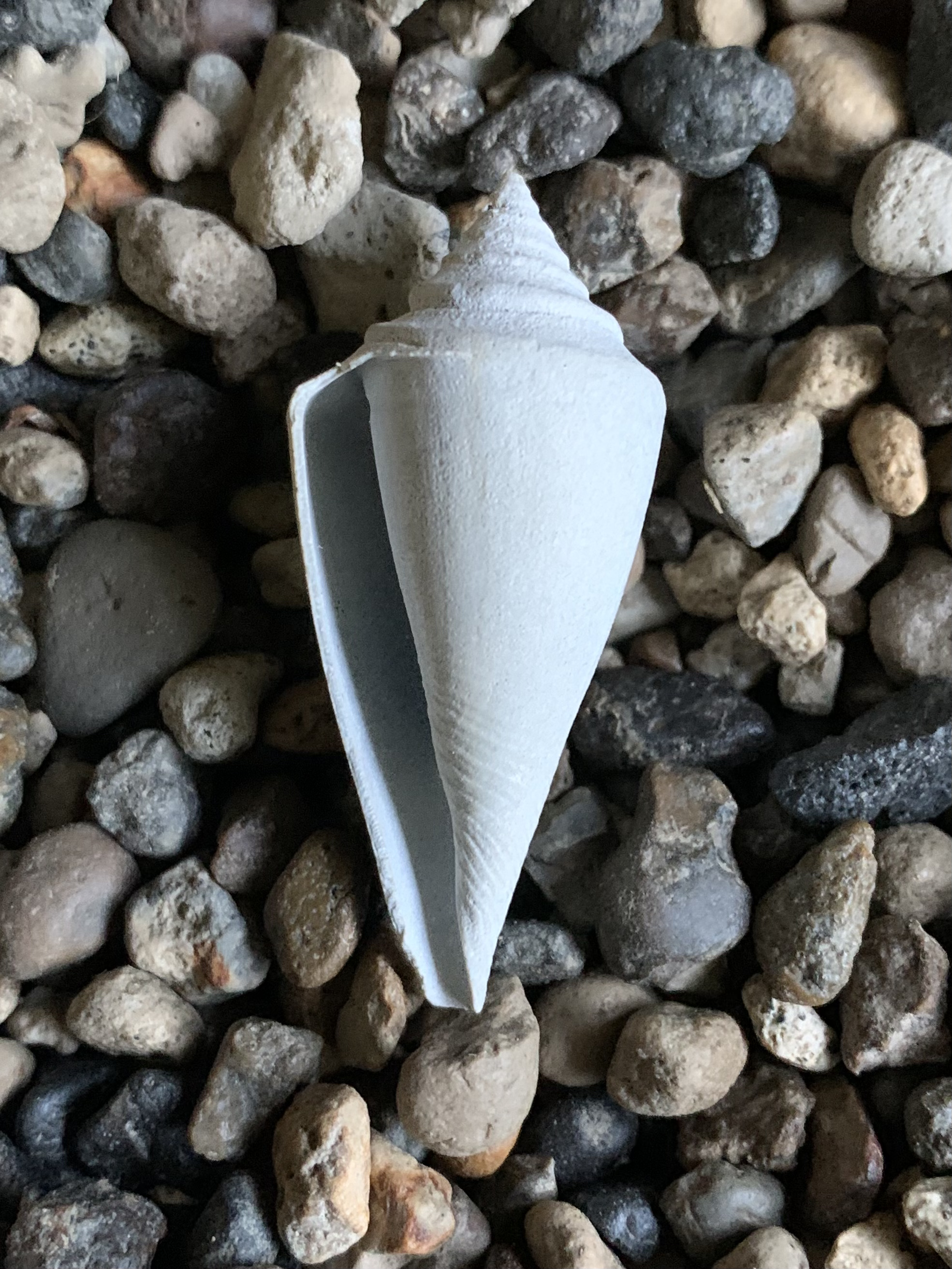
- A specimen of Contraconus adversarius

Scientific classification
- Kingdom: Animalia
- Phylum: Mollusca
- Class: Gastropoda
- Subclass: Caenogastropoda
- Order: Neogastropoda
- Family: Conidae
- Genus: †Contraconus
- Species: †C. adversarius

Binomial name
- †Contraconus adversarius Conrad, 1840

Synonyms
- † Conus adversarius Conrad 1840; † Conus (Contraconus) adversarius Conrad 1840; †Contraconus berryi Petuch 1994; †Contraconus heilprin Petuch 1994; †Contraconus lindajoyceae Petuch 1991; †Contraconus mitchellorum Petuch 1994; †Contraconus osceolai Petuch 1991; †Contraconus petiti Petuch 2001; †Contraconus schmidti Petuch 1991; †Contraconus scotti Petuch 1994; †Contraconus tryoni Heilprin 1886; †Conus tryoni Heilprin 1886

= Contraconus adversarius =

Contraconus adversarius Temporal range: Zanclean-Gelsian

Extinct sinistral cone snail

Contraconus adversarius is an extinct species of venomous sea snail in the genus Contraconus. It lived from the Early Pliocene until the Early Pleistocene. The genus that is entirely sinistral (left handed).

Initially described by T. A. Conrad in 1840 in Duplin County, North Carolina. The species is present in formations from south Florida to Virginia. It occupied a multitude of different marine ecosystems, which include reefs and deep sea environments.

== Name ==
The species name “adversarius” is a Latin word that means “against” or “opposed to”. This name is likely in reference to the sinistral nature of the species, which sets it apart from other species in the genus.

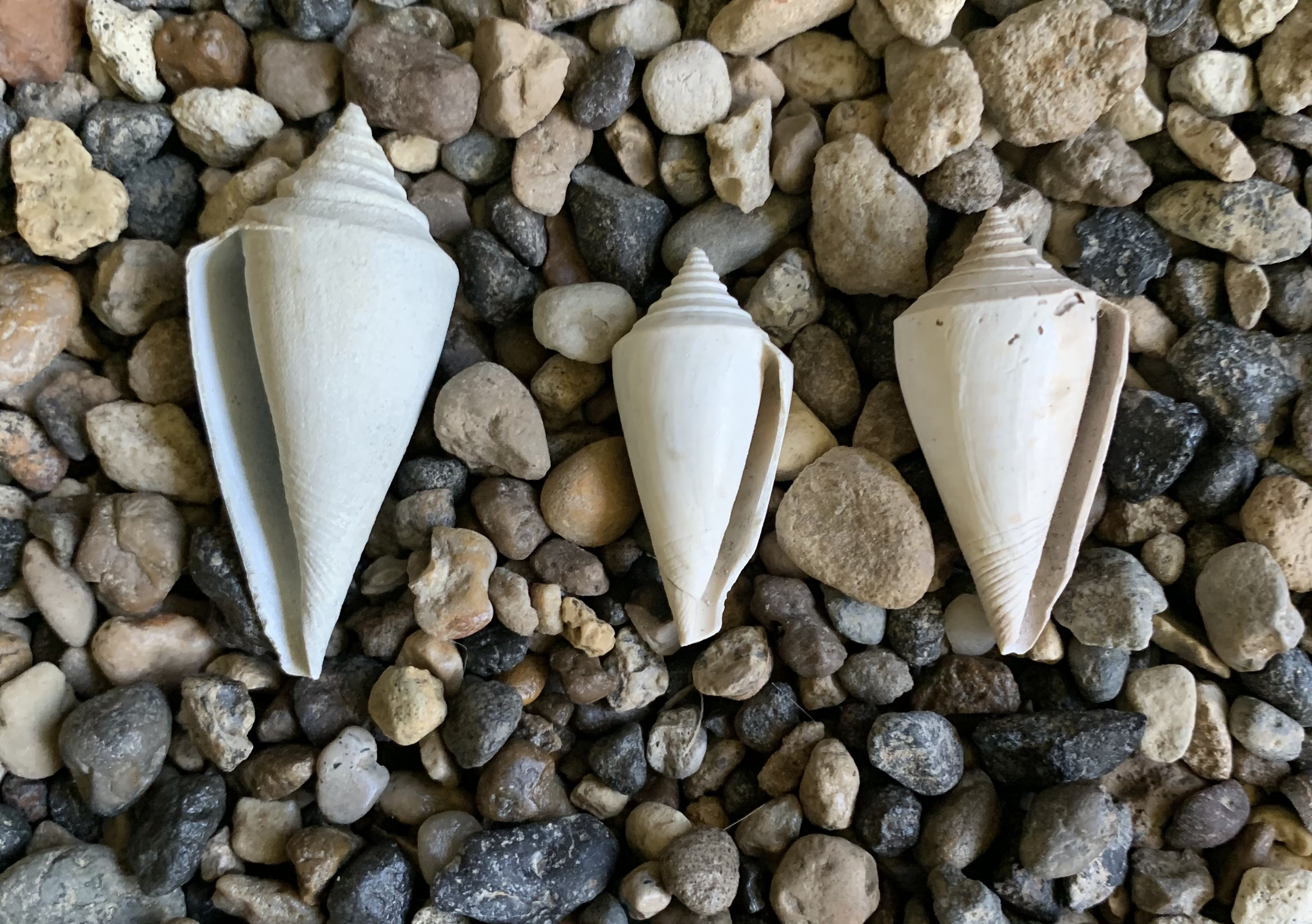
A Contraconus adversarius alongside two other fossil cones; highlighting the sinistral nature of the shell, in which the name is in reference to.

== Discovery ==
The first specimen of Contraconus adversarius was collected by Professor Mitchell of Chapel Hill, North Carolina. It was found in (what is termed by Conrad) as the “Medial tertiary” of Duplin County. Some time afterwards, it (and some other fossils) came into the possession of an individual by the name of Daniel B. Smith. Daniel was a friend of T. A. Conrad who was the first to recognize the importance of the fossils.

The species was first described in 1840, on page 388 of the American Journal of Science and Art, vol 39. Conrad had written to the editors of the journal that he had acquired some fossil shells of species that he believed to be new, and had given the descriptions of each to be published.

== Description ==
Contraconus adversarius can be almost immediately distinguished from most my all other Conidae species due to the sinistral nature of its shell. It is also the largest fossil conid in the southeastern United States: specimens from Florida are known to 27 cm.

== Ecology ==
Habitat

Contraconus adversarius occupied a variety of habitats around the southeastern United States. These include reefs, open-marine environments, the deep sea, coastal waters, restricted shallow subtidal and offshore environments. The mean annual temperature analyzed between 3 specimens recorded from the Tamiami formation (pinecrest beds) was 24.9, 22.67 and 23.3°C.

Life span

Research into the same 3 specimens has shown the largest and smallest both lived the same amount of time, 2 years each.

Predators

Natural predators of Contraconus adversarius included Crabs, Octopuses and Moon snails, as evidenced by damage to their shells.

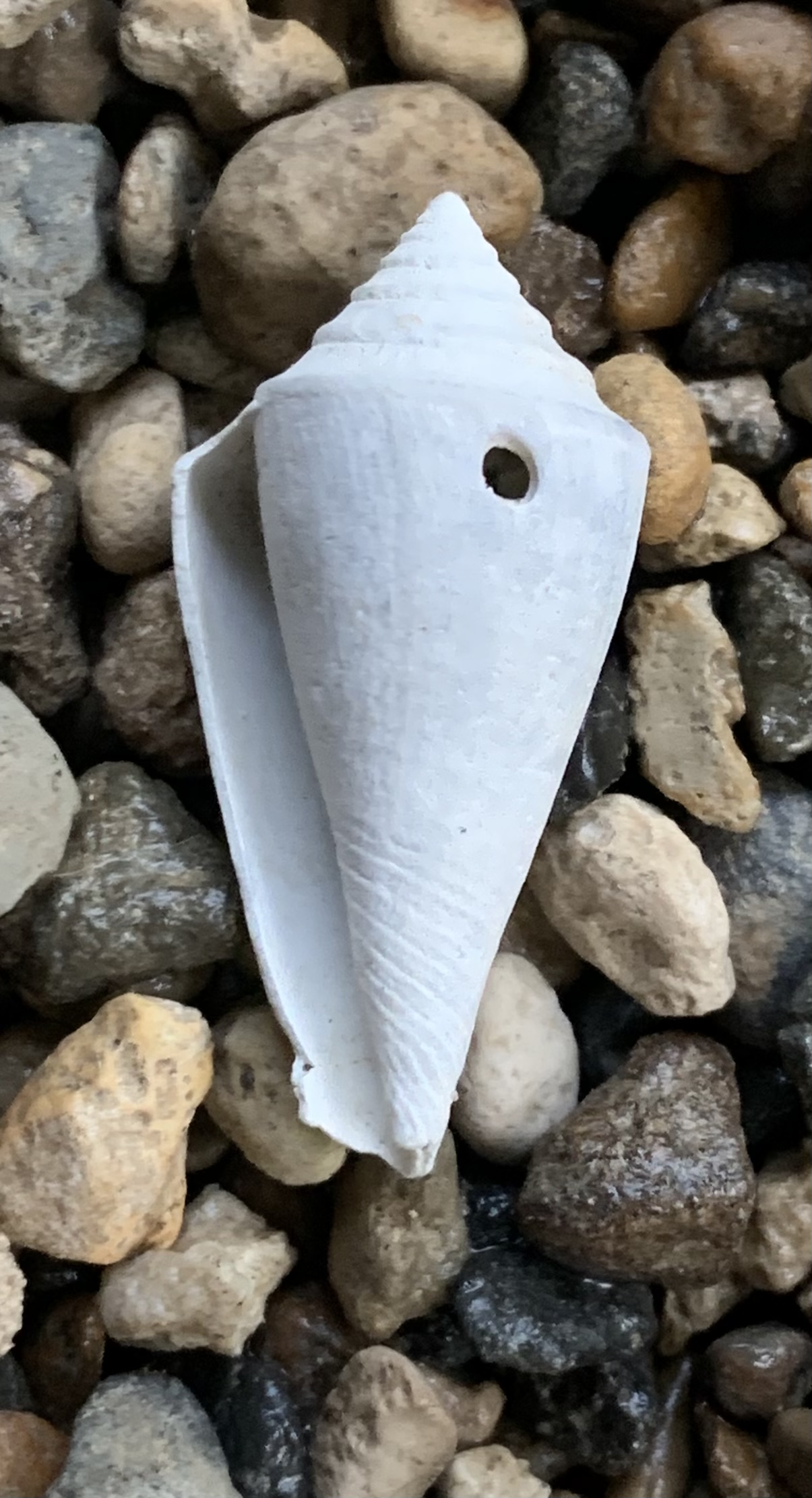
A Contraconus adversarius shell featuring an octopus drill hole

Prey

Juvenile and adult Contraconus adversarius would have featured differing diets, which would change with age. As with modern cones, they would’ve used a harpoon-like organ to stun prey, before dragging them back to the snail for consumption. Juveniles would’ve eaten small sea worms, whilst the larger adults would’ve fed on fish and other snails.
