= Beulaville, North Carolina =

- Town
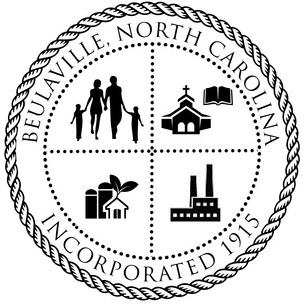
- Seal
- Motto: "A Place to Come Home To"
- Location within the state of North Carolina
- Coordinates: 34°55′22″N 77°46′21″W
- Country: United States
- State: North Carolina
- County: Duplin

Government
  - Mayor: Hutch Jones

Area
  - Total: 1.54 sq mi (4.00 km^{2})
  - Land: 1.54 sq mi (4.00 km^{2})
  - Water: 0 sq mi (0.00 km^{2})
- Elevation: 82 ft (25 m)

Population (2020)
  - Total: 1,116
  - Density: 722.4/sq mi (278.93/km^{2})
- Time zone: UTC-5 (Eastern (EST))
  - Summer (DST): UTC-4 (EDT)
- ZIP code: 28518
- Area codes: 910, 472
- FIPS code: 37-05660
- GNIS feature ID: 2405259
- Website: www.townofbeulaville.com

Beulaville is a town located in Duplin County, North Carolina, United States. As of the 2020 census, the population was 1,116. The community lies within the Limestone Creek Township.

== History ==
=== Native American Presence ===
The earliest Native Americans thought to have lived in the area were the Joara (whose settlements date back to AD 1000), based out of present-day Burke County. The Joara were the chiefdom of the Mississippian culture. Immediately prior to European colonization in the early 18th century, the coastal plain of North Carolina was home to many distinct Native American tribes: the Coree, Coharie, several small Neusiok communities, and the Tuscarora. This latter tribe gradually became the most dominant in the region as smaller tribes were either exterminated by Europeans or peacefully assimilated into the Tuscarora for collective security. By the time of permanent European settlement, the Tuscarora were utilizing the heavily forested areas of eastern Duplin County as a hunting ground.

Native American burial mounds are numerous in Duplin County, in the rural areas surrounding Beulaville especially. There are four sizable mounds within a ten-mile radius of the town, the two largest being in the vicinity of Hallsville and Sarecta. Combined, these mounds contain roughly one hundred bodies.

=== European Settlement ===
The arrival of the Palatines at New Bern and the ensuing wave of English and Welsh settlers sparked a conflict known as the Tuscarora War (1710–1715). With the elimination of the last Tuscarora stronghold at Fort Neoheroka and subsequent exodus of the remainder of the tribe to New York (they became the sixth nation of the Iroquois Confederacy), the interior of the coastal plain was made available for European settlement. Many of the original European settlers of what is now Beulaville arrived from Beaufort, Craven, Jones, and Onslow counties.

In 1736, Duplin County (then upper New Hanover County) was the destination of several hundred Ulster Scots (Scotch-Irish) and a handful of Swiss Protestants. They settled on a plot of land, 71,160 acres (28,800 ha) between the Northeast Cape Fear River and Black River, obtained from the Crown by Henry McCulloh of London. Their first settlements were Soracta (Sarecta) on the Northeast Cape Fear, an area at the lower end of Goshen Swamp (then called Woodward's Chase), and the grove where the Duplin County Courthouse now stands. According to census records, several families of Sarecta and the settlement at the south end of Goshen Swamp had gravitated to the crossroads of what would become Beulaville by the middle of the nineteenth century.

Beulaville proper was founded as "Snatchet" in 1873 out of necessity for a trading center for nearby farmers and those in the business of logging and turpentine production. Also colloquially referred to as "Tearshirt" by locals, the town was once notorious for alcoholism and frequent street brawls. Indeed, the manufacture and distribution of corn liquor remained a steady source of income for many families well into the 20th century. Upon demolition of a prominent downtown building (which had formerly served as a soda shop in the 1950s) to make way for a McDonald's, a moonshine still and several barrels of the drink were uncovered in the basement.

The Kinston Carolina Railroad and Lumber Company constructed a railway from Kinston to Pink Hill around 1900. In response, residents of Limestone Creek Township spent $15,000 to lobby for the creation of the "Duplin County Railroad" in 1916, extending the Kinston line through Beulaville and Chinquapin. The rail, which ran alongside present-day Railroad Street, has since been destroyed. The post office of Snatchet was officially re-designated "Beulaville" in 1910, and the town was incorporated five years later. The town's name is derived from the Beulah Baptist Church (now the Beulaville Baptist Church). Beulaville is the most recent town to be incorporated in Duplin County.

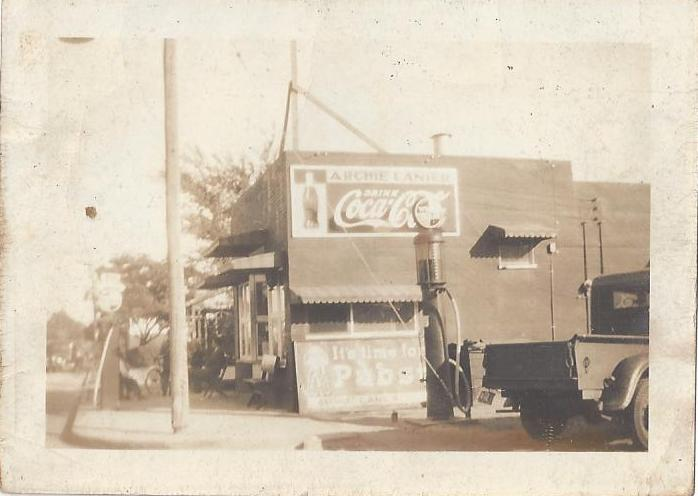
Archie Lanier's Store

== Education ==
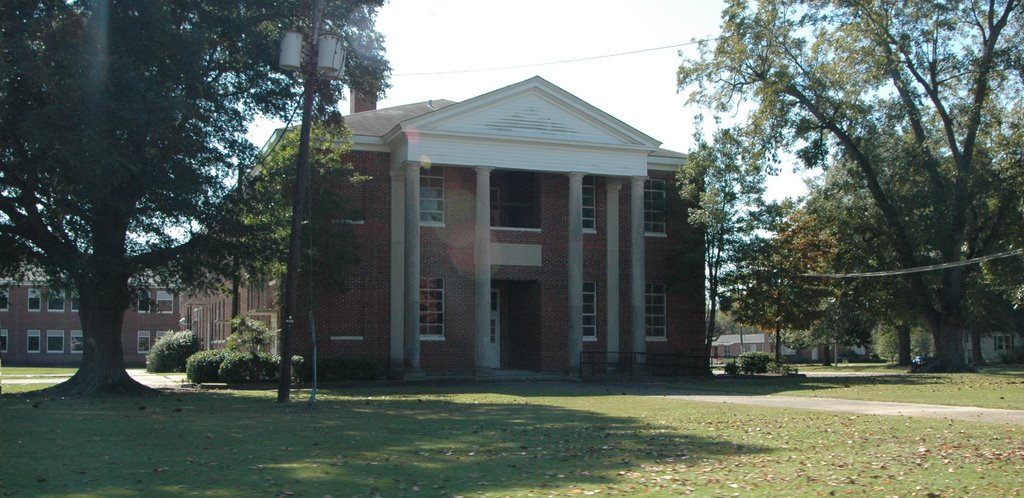
Former Beulaville High School, Currently Town Hall

In 1839, the county passed a tax for the creation of a public school system. Several decades later (sometime around 1870) the first public school in what would become Beulaville was constructed. The facility - which was no more than a small wood cabin - employed only one teacher. By 1901, however, four teachers were working out of the schoolhouse. In 1906, property was purchased for a new school. A new two-story wooden building was erected and first used in the school year of 1917–1918; the enrollment for that year was nearly 200. Three additions – the auditorium, gym, and band building – were added in 1923, and additional tracts of land were purchased for the school between 1933 and 1950. On November 6, 1945, the school's main building burned to the ground. Only the John Hargett Gymnasium and auditorium were spared. School continued in these buildings and the teacherage located next door until the fall of 1947, when the elementary school building was rebuilt and a new high school building had been constructed. Potter's Hill Elementary merged with Beulaville in 1960, and integration was implemented shortly after.

Beulaville is home to one elementary/middle school (Beulaville Elementary) and one secondary school (East Duplin High School). The mascot for both schools, as well as nearby B. F. Grady, is the panther, referring to the eastern cougar which once roamed the swamps and forests of eastern North Carolina. East Duplin High School was built in 1963 and consolidates the elementary schools of Beulaville, B. F. Grady, and Chinquapin.

== Geography ==
Beulaville is located on the coastal plain of North Carolina in Duplin County. It is situated at 85 feet (26 m) above sea level, with only minimal changes in topography. Limestone Creek, a small body of water that runs into the Northeast Cape Fear River at Hallsville, borders the western boundary of town. Beulaville is 90 miles (140 km) southeast of Raleigh and 312 miles (502 km) south of Washington, D.C.

According to the United States Census Bureau, the town has a total area of 1.5 square miles (3.9 km^{2}), all land.

== Demographics ==
Historical population
Census	Pop.	Note	%±
1880	32		—
1890	51		59.4%
1920	354		—
1930	494		39.5%
1940	567		14.8%
1950	724		27.7%
1960	1,062		46.7%
1970	1,156		8.9%
1980	1,060		−8.3%
1990	933		−12.0%
2000	1,067		14.4%
2010	1,296		21.5%
2020	1,116		−13.9%
U.S. Decennial Census

=== 2020 census ===
Beulaville racial composition
Race	Number	Percentage
White (non-Hispanic)	684	61.29%
Black or African American (non-Hispanic)	278	24.91%
Native American	9	0.81%
Asian	6	0.54%
Other/Mixed	47	4.21%
Hispanic or Latino	92	8.24%

As of the 2020 United States census, there were 1,116 people, 748 households, and 388 families residing in the town.

=== 2000 census ===
As of the census of 2000, there were 1,067 people, 442 households, and 274 families residing in the town. The population density was 734.8 inhabitants per square mile (283.7/km^{2}). There were 501 housing units at an average density of 345.0 per square mile (133.2/km^{2}). The racial makeup of the town was 73.48% White, 20.81% African American, 0.28% Native American, 0.19% Asian, 3.94% from other races, and 1.31% from two or more races. Hispanic or Latino of any race were 5.81% of the population.

There were 442 households, out of which 26.0% had children under the age of 18 living with them, 43.7% were married couples living together, 15.6% had a female householder with no husband present, and 38.0% were non-families. 35.5% of all households were made up of individuals, and 16.5% had someone living alone who was 65 years of age or older. The average household size was 2.24 and the average family size was 2.89.

In the town, the population was spread out, with 23.1% under the age of 18, 6.2% from 18 to 24, 21.3% from 25 to 44, 25.7% from 45 to 64, and 23.7% who were 65 years of age or older. The median age was 44 years. For every 100 females, there were 76.9 males. For every 100 females age 18 and over, there were 69.4 males.

The median income for a household in the town was $32,059, and the median income for a family was $40,347. Males had a median income of $30,104 versus $24,583 for females. The per capita income for the town was $19,571. About 15.4% of families and 18.9% of the population were below the poverty line, including 24.0% of those under age 18 and 11.7% of those age 65 or over.

== Recreation ==
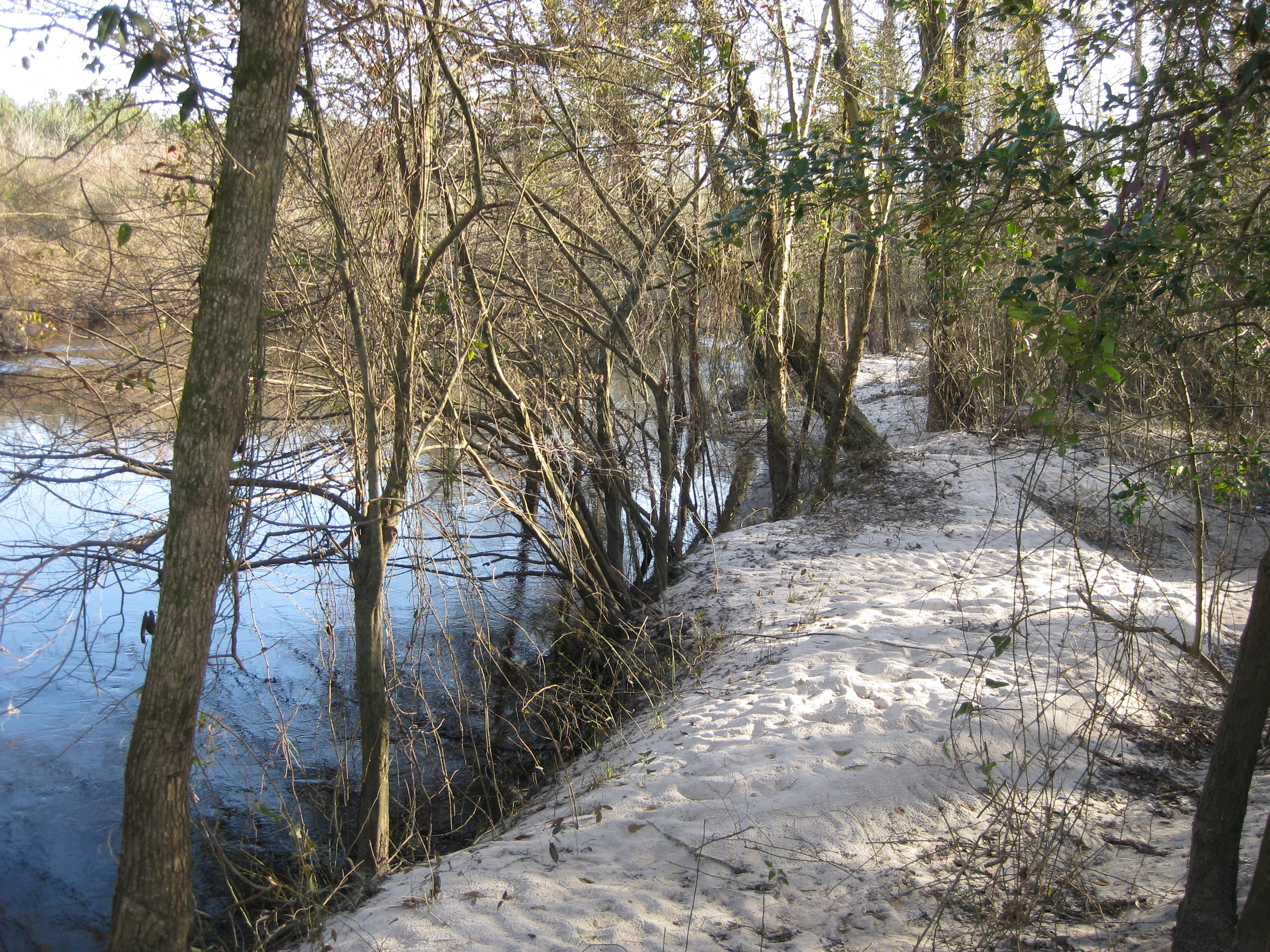
On the banks of the Northeast Cape Fear River at Hallsville

Situated 4 miles (6 km) east of the meandering Northeast Cape Fear River, Beulaville offers much in the way of outdoor recreation. There are two boat landings on the Northeast Cape Fear River within a 7-mile (11 km) radius of town. The communal landing at Hallsville, which had, for centuries, been used by locals for activities ranging from baptisms to bonfires, has been closed off to the public. The other landing is located west of Beulaville, off Highway 24, halfway to Kenansville. Several golf courses can also be found near Beulaville and in the greater Duplin area.

Within the town limits there are three public parks providing a variety of recreational needs, to include the William Ray Humphrey Athletic Park, a ballpark converted from the former elementary school's recreational fields. The park, located behind the Beulaville Municipal Complex, boasts three baseball fields, two tennis courts, two outdoor basketball courts, and the John Hargett indoor gymnasium.

5 miles (8 km) north of Beulaville on Highway 111, the 167-acre Cabin Lake County Park attracts many locals and visitors for year-round camping, canoeing, and hiking. Additionally, the Tarkil Branch Farm Museum at Cedar Fork, 7 miles (11 km) southeast of Beulaville, features a genuine 1830s homestead complete with over 850 artifacts; the operation is situated on a 375-acre working farm.

== Economy ==
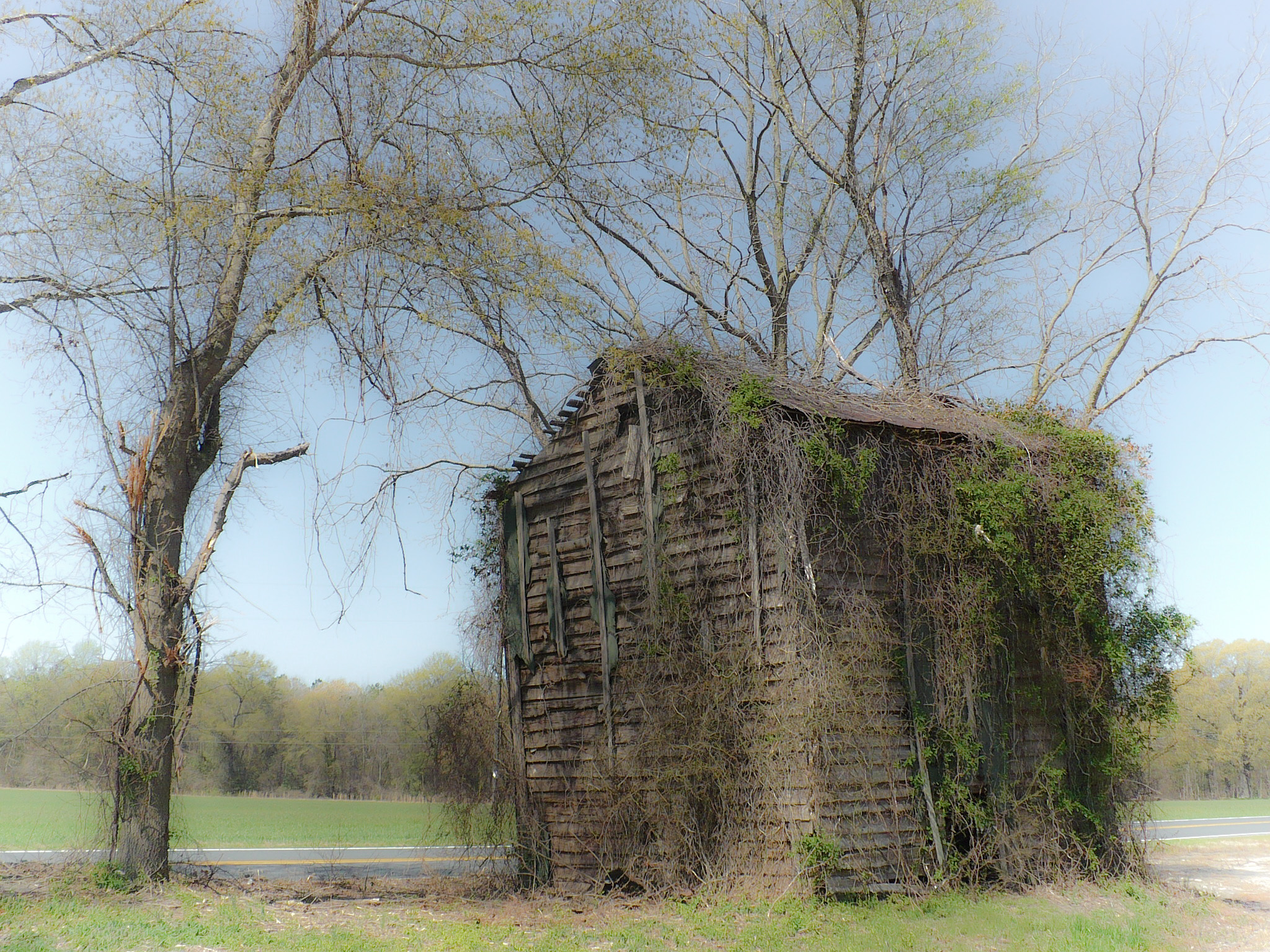
Roadside tobacco barn near Sarecta

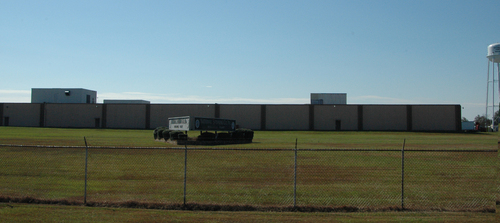
National Spinning, Beulaville location, which is no longer in business

The manufacture of naval stores and lumbering were the first marketable enterprises for the families inhabiting what is now Limestone Creek Township. These commodities were ferried down the Northeast Cape Fear River (which, in the early nineteenth century, had been made navigable) to Wilmington. As demand for naval stores fell, however, the cultivation of corn and, most importantly, tobacco moved to the forefront. As many of the small-scale tobacco growers dropped out of the market due to tobacco buyouts, an economic stimulus was needed; it came in the form of hogs. Agriculture is still the economic lifeline of Beulaville (Duplin now boasts the second highest hog-to-human ratio in the country), though service industries and manufacturing jobs are gradually supplanting this tradition. Viticulture has noticeably increased throughout the area over the past decade as well. The North Carolina Global TransPark, a 2,500-acre (1,000 ha) multi-modal industrial air terminal, is located 30 miles (48 km) to the north in Kinston and is a perk for industry to locate to the area. Beulaville has also benefited from its proximity to Marine Corps Base Camp Lejeune 35 miles (56 km) to the southeast in both traffic volume on NC 24 en route to Interstate 40 and in job opportunities for citizens.

=== Notable nearby employers ===
Company	Industry	Employment (countywide)
Butterball, LLC	Manufacturing	1000+
Smithfield Foods, Inc	Manufacturing	1000+
Duplin County Schools	Education	1000+
House of Raeford, Inc	Manufacturing	1000+
Guilford Mills, Inc	Manufacturing	500-999
County of Duplin	Public Admin	500-999
Murphy Family Ven.	Natural Res.	500-999
James Sprunt CC	Education	250-499
Eastpointe Human Services	Managed Care Organization	100-249
Goshen Medical	Health Svc.	100-249
Superior Metal Structures & Concrete, LLC	Manufacturing	10-15
Precision Hydraulic	Manufacturing	100-249
McDonald's	Hospitality	50-99

== Churches ==
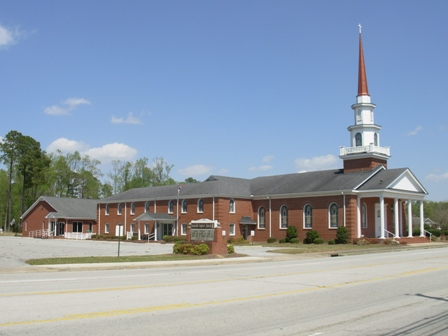
Beulaville Baptist Church

- Beulaville Baptist Church
- Pathway Church
- Beulaville Independent Church of God
- Beulaville Presbyterian Church
- Beulaville United Methodist Church
- Bible Believers Fellowship
- Cedar Fork Baptist Church
- Church of Christ
- Cross of Christ Community Church
- Daisy Chapel Missionary Baptist Church
- Faith Deliverance and Restoration Ministries
- Grace Covenant Church
- Imprint Church (formerly located in Chinquapin, NC)
- Macedonia Holiness Church
- Maranatha Pentecostal Free Will Baptist Church
- Pathway Church (formerly known as "Beulaville Pentecostal Free Will Baptist Church")
- Pentecostal Church of God
- Piney Grove Pentecostal Free Will Baptist Church
- Santa Teresa del Niño Jesús Catholic Mission

== Main highways ==
- NC 24
- NC 41
- NC 111
- NC 241

== Notable people ==
- Charles W. Albertson (b. 1932), Democratic politician who represented the 5th and 10th districts in the North Carolina State Senate from 1993 to 2010. Albertson also served in the North Carolina House of Representatives from 1989 to 1992 and held the position of Democratic Caucus Secretary from 2005 to 2010. He has earned the nickname "The Singing Senator."
- Grady Mercer (1906–1982). A Democrat, Mercer practiced law and farmed. Mercer became a county judge and, in 1959, a member of the North Carolina State Senate, representing the 9th District. Baptist. Member, Farm Bureau; Woodmen; Freemasons; Order of the Eastern Star; Shriners.
