= Eagles Nest Airport =

Eagles Nest Airport may refer to:

- Eagles Nest Airport (New Jersey) in West Creek, New Jersey, USA
- Eagles Nest Airport (North Carolina) in Potters Hill, North Carolina, USA
- Eagle Nest Ranch Airport in Estacada, Oregon, USA
- Eagle's Nest Airport (Virginia) in Waynesboro, Virginia, USA

== See also ==
- Nest of Eagles Airport, an airport in Spooner, Wisconsin, USA
- US Park Police Eagle's Nest Heliport, a heliport in Washington, D.C., USA
