= Hallsville, North Carolina =

- Town
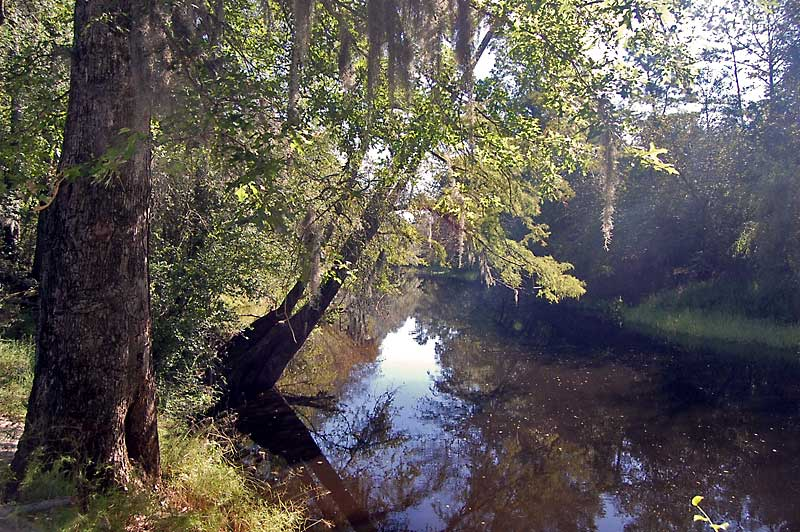
- The Northeast Cape Fear River at Hallsville

- Location within the state of North Carolina
- Coordinates: 34°54′26″N 77°50′21″W
- Country: United States
- State: North Carolina
- County: Duplin
- Established: 1828
- Elevation: 39 ft (12 m)
- Time zone: UTC-5 (Eastern (EST))
  - Summer (DST): UTC-4 (EDT)
- ZIP code: 28518
- Area codes: 910, 472
- FIPS code: 37-29080
- GNIS feature ID: 1020595

Hallsville is an unincorporated community located adjacent to the Northeast Cape Fear River in Duplin County, North Carolina, United States.

== History ==
Hallsville was served by a post office from 1828 until March 1930; its first postmaster was Zebulon Simpson. In 1736, Duplin County (then upper New Hanover County) was the destination of several hundred Ulster Scots (Scotch-Irish) and a handful of Swiss Protestants. They settled on a plot of land, 71,160 acres between the N. E. Cape Fear River and Black River, obtained from the Crown by Henry McCulloh Esq. of London - this tract included what would become Hallsville.

The namesake of the Hall family, which had been living in the area since the mid-1700s, Hallsville was once the site of a plantation owned by Thomas Pearsall Hall. Hall, who was also a prominent dealer of turpentine, owned 51 slaves, making him one of the largest slaveholders in the county at that time.

Hallsville was the scene of a brief commotion when, on July 6, 1863, a retreating Federal cavalry detachment being pursued by Colonel Thorburn, the Confederate Commandant for the City of Wilmington, passed through. The Confederates had hoped that they could trap the Federals at the river, but they had already crossed before any plan could materialize. The 1890 Census puts the population of Hallsville at a mere 24 persons. In 1899, however, Hallsville became the upper-most loading point for the steamship Saint Peter, which made runs to the port of Wilmington. The primary export of Hallsville during this period was lumber and naval stores. The community, now being serviced by a steamship, saw a sudden, although marginal, population increase. The upper stretch of the "Northeast River", however, could be quite treacherous and was not conducive to frequent travel by steamship. When the Kinston Carolina Railroad Company laid track through the eastern portion of Duplin County in 1916, Hallsville was bypassed. With the incorporation of nearby Beulaville at the advantageous intersection of several major thoroughfares the following year, the importance of Hallsville was negated and the remainder of the community's population began dispersing, save but a few families.

=== Notable residents ===
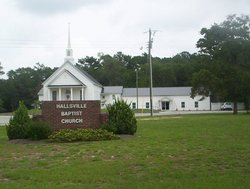
Hallsville Baptist Church

- Parker Robbins (1834-1917), soldier, legislator, inventor, postmaster, agriculturalist; Black descendant of a chief of the Chowan tribe
