= Angola Swamp =

Coordinates: 34°42′00″N 77°50′00″W

Angola Swamp is a pocosin in southern coastal North Carolina near Jacksonville, in Duplin and Pender counties. Much of the swamp is included in the 34,063-acre (13,785 ha) Angola Bay Game Land, administered by the North Carolina Wildlife Resources Commission. The southern section of the swamp was logged and has a road grid, while the northern portion is wild and roadless. The swamp is drained by the Northeast Cape Fear River.
