= Interstate 140 (North Carolina) =

Highway in North Carolina

Interstate 140 and North Carolina Highway 140
- John Jay Burney Jr. Freeway
- I-140 highlighted in red, NC 140 highlighted in purple

Route information
- Auxiliary route of I-40
- Maintained by NCDOT
- Length: 25.4 mi (40.9 km)
- Existed: August 22, 2005–present

Interstate 140
- West end: US 17 near Winnabow
- Major intersections: US 74 / US 76 near Leland; US 421 near Wrightsboro
- East end: I-40 near Murraysville

North Carolina Highway 140
- West end: I-40 near Murraysville
- East end: US 17 in Kirkland

Location
- Country: United States
- State: North Carolina
- Counties: Brunswick, New Hanover

Highway system
- Interstate Highway System; Main; Auxiliary; Suffixed; Business; Future; North Carolina Highway System; Interstate; US; State; Scenic
← NC 138	→ NC 141

Interstate 140 (I-140) and North Carolina Highway 140 (NC 140) is a 25.4-mile (40.9 km) auxiliary Interstate Highway and state highway in the U.S. state of North Carolina. Officially designated the John Jay Burney Jr. Freeway, it serves as a bypass of Wilmington. The western terminus of the highway is at U.S. Route 17 (US 17) near Winnabow. It heads north in western Leland before turning to the east north of an interchange with U.S. Route 74 (US 74)/U.S. Route 76 (US 76). I-140 crosses the Cape Fear River north of Navassa and the Northeast Cape Fear River northwest of Wrightsboro. I-140 ends at Interstate 40 (I-40), and the route number changes to NC 140. NC 140 continues to the east, ending at US 17 in Kirkland.

The need for a bypass north of Wilmington was identified by the North Carolina Department of Transportation (NCDOT) in 1972. However, the first contract for construction was not awarded until 2000. In August 2005, the first segment of I-140 between I-40 and North Carolina Highway 133 (NC 133) opened. This was followed by a westward extension to U.S. Route 421 (US 421) and an eastward extension to US 17 in June 2006. US 17 was routed along the entirety of the freeway between Kirkland and US 421, running concurrently with I-140. Construction on the western segment between Winnabow and US 74/US 76 began in March 2010 and was opened in September 2014. This segment was temporarily designated as NC 140 as it lacked connection with I-140 to the east. The final segment between US 74/US 76 and US 421 began construction in 2014 and was completed in 2017. I-140 was routed along the entirety of the freeway west of I-40. Additionally, US 17 was removed from its concurrency with I-140, being rerouted through Wilmington in 2017. The remaining section between I-40 and Kirkland was subsequently renumbered as NC 140.

== Route description ==
The western terminus of I-140 is located at a trumpet interchange with US 17 north of the community of Winnabow and southwest of Leland. The I-140 bridge crossing over US 17 at the interchange is named after Wilber E. Rabon, a former Brunswick County Commissioner. I-140 begins running to the northwest, paralleling NC 87 to the east. The highway adjusts and turns to the north, running to the west of a railroad track owned by Military Ocean Terminal Sunny Point. The highway meets US 74/US 76 (exit 5) at a partial cloverleaf interchange. Immediately to the north of the interchange, I-140 enters a residential area, with neighborhoods located on both sides of the highway. The highway also makes a turn to the southeast and east, bypassing both Leland and Navassa to the north. Two additional interchanges at Mount Misery Road (exit 8) and Cedar Hill Road (exit 10) are located along I-140 in Brunswick County. The Interstate crosses the Cape Fear River along the L. Bobby Brown Bridge and enters New Hanover County to the northwest of Wilmington.

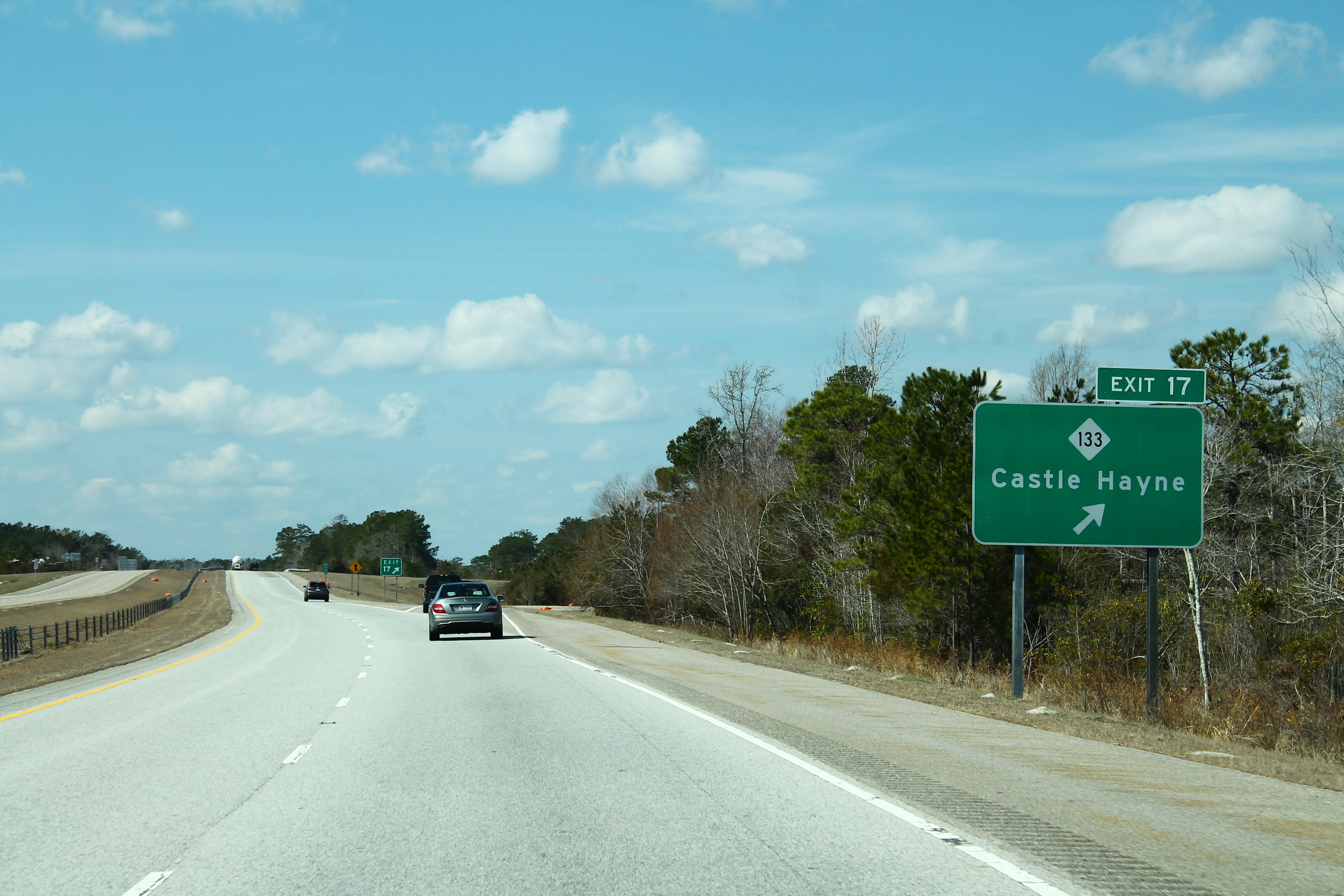
I-140 approaching NC 133 north of Wrightsboro

Entering New Hanover County, I-140 crosses through an industrial area and begins a turn to the northeast. I-140 meets with US 421 (exit 14) at another partial cloverleaf interchange. Continuing past US 421, I-140 continues in a northeasterly direction, crossing the Northeast Cape Fear River on the Dan Cameron Bridge. The bridge measures 1.43 miles (2.30 km) in length with a main span of 479 feet (146 m) and 82 feet (25 m) of vertical clearance above the river, Rat Island, and adjacent marshlands. Northeast of the bridge, I-140 begins a turn to the east, running alongside a General Electric/Hitachi facility. I-140 meets with NC 133 (exit 17) north of Wrightsboro while turning to the southeast. Crossing Blue Clay Road, I-140 makes another turn to the northeast but turns back to the east before crossing under US 117 and NC 132. I-140 reaches its eastern terminus at a modified cloverleaf interchange with I-40 (exit 20). The ramp between I-140 East and I-40 West uses a flyover design instead of the traditional cloverleaf design.

At the I-40 interchange, the route number changes to NC 140 as the freeway continues to the east. Between I-40 and US 17, the highway runs slightly to the southeast primarily through a wooded area. An interchange is currently under construction with the proposed US 17 Byp. (Military Cutoff Road) northeast of Murraysville. The eastern terminus of NC 140 is located at a trumpet interchange with US 17 in the census-designated place of Kirkland. US 17 merges onto the road and continues as a multilane arterial highway to the northeast.

== History ==
=== First proposal: Raleigh to Sanford ===
During the 1990s, North Carolina originally proposed the I-140 designation for 32.36 miles (52.08 km) along the recently upgraded US 1 freeway between the Raleigh–Cary line and Sanford. The American Association of State Highway and Transportation Officials (AASHTO) ultimately disapproved of the routing in their 1999 meeting.

=== Wilmington northern bypass ===
The idea of constructing a northern bypass for Wilmington was initially identified by NCDOT as a need in 1972. The outer loop was viewed as a means to help relieve traffic congestion along Market Street and the Cape Fear Memorial Bridge, serving as an additional crossing of the Cape Fear River and providing for better regional connectivity. However, the project was not included as part of the department's construction schedule until 1989. In 1991, NCDOT initiated the evaluation of a pair of proposed routes for the Northern Outer Loop. The northern routing was to have been approximately 22 miles (35 km) in length; it would have resulted in the relocation of 19 homes and 19 businesses while traversing 1,247 acres (505 ha) of wetlands, nine potential hazardous waste sites, and five historic sites. The southern routing was to have been approximately 20 miles (32 km) in length; it would have resulted in the relocation of 58 homes and eight businesses while traversing 2,064 acres (835 ha) of wetlands, seven potential hazardous waste sites, and eight historic sites.

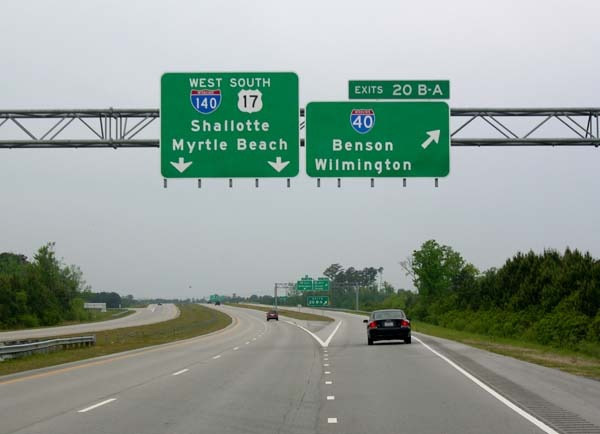
The I-40 interchange (pictured) was the first segment to begin construction.

In November 1994, the North Carolina Board of Transportation elected to move forward with the southern routing. The initial 5.8-mile (9.3 km) link between I-40 and US 421 was originally to begin construction in 1998 and open by 2001. Due to significant opposition by both local residents and officials, NCDOT unveiled a revised routing in April 1996 that located the route one mile (1.6 km) north of the initial proposal. This revised "central route" was selected as the final routing by NCDOT in April 1997. At the time of its announcement, the route was estimated to cost $126.5 million (equivalent to $233 million in 2024) to complete and result in the displacement of 20 homes, eight businesses, the loss of 118 acres (48 ha) of wetlands, and the loss of 290 acres (120 ha) of farmland. Planning would continue through the late 1990s, culminating with the first contract awarded for its construction in November 2000 for the I-40 interchange.

In 1997, local officials initially stated that an Interstate designation was sought for the bypass. In September 2002, the Federal Highway Administration announced that it would grant NCDOT's request and designate the Northern Outer Loop as Interstate 140. The designation was to apply to the initial western segment constructed between I-40 and US 421 and the initial eastern segment constructed between I-40 and US 17. At the time of its announcement, the designation was touted as a significant means to enhance economic development opportunities along its route in addition to potentially serving as a tie-in for moving the proposed eastern terminus of I-74 from Myrtle Beach to Wilmington. Later that month, it was announced the segment east of I-40, would be named the John J. Burney Freeway after the state senator and trustee of the University of North Carolina at Wilmington.

In an effort to protect scenic viewsheds for motorists utilizing the freeway, the Special Highway Overlay District of the New Hanover County Zoning Ordinance was adopted by the County Commission in June 2001. Some of the restrictions of the overlay include banning the construction of billboards, limiting outdoor storage, and increasing setback requirements for structures adjacent to the roadway. Only nine applications for billboards along I-140 were processed and approved prior to its passage.

=== Construction and opening ===
The initial $36.7-million (equivalent to $59.8 million in 2024) contract for construction of a 6.5-mile (10.5 km) segment of the eastern leg was awarded by NCDOT to Barnhill Contracting Company in November 2003. Its construction had been delayed due to several conflicts. This included the handling of stormwater runoff into Futch Creek and a slight redesign of an offramp at the Market Street interchange in Kirkland to avoid a 450-year-old oak tree. Construction of the eastern segment commenced on December 29, 2003. As late as May 2005, NCDOT remained undecided as to whether or not to open only a portion of the road prior to completion of the elevated section due to the bridge section running behind schedule. The first segment of I-140 opened to traffic on August 22, 2005. Formally dedicated with Governor Mike Easley and US Representative Mike McIntyre in attendance, the 3.2-mile (5.1 km) segment was located between I-40 and NC 133 (Castle Hayne Road). In November 2005, the North Carolina Board of Transportation voted unanimously to name the I-140 bridge across the Northeast Cape Fear River in honor of former Wilmington mayor and businessman Dan Cameron.

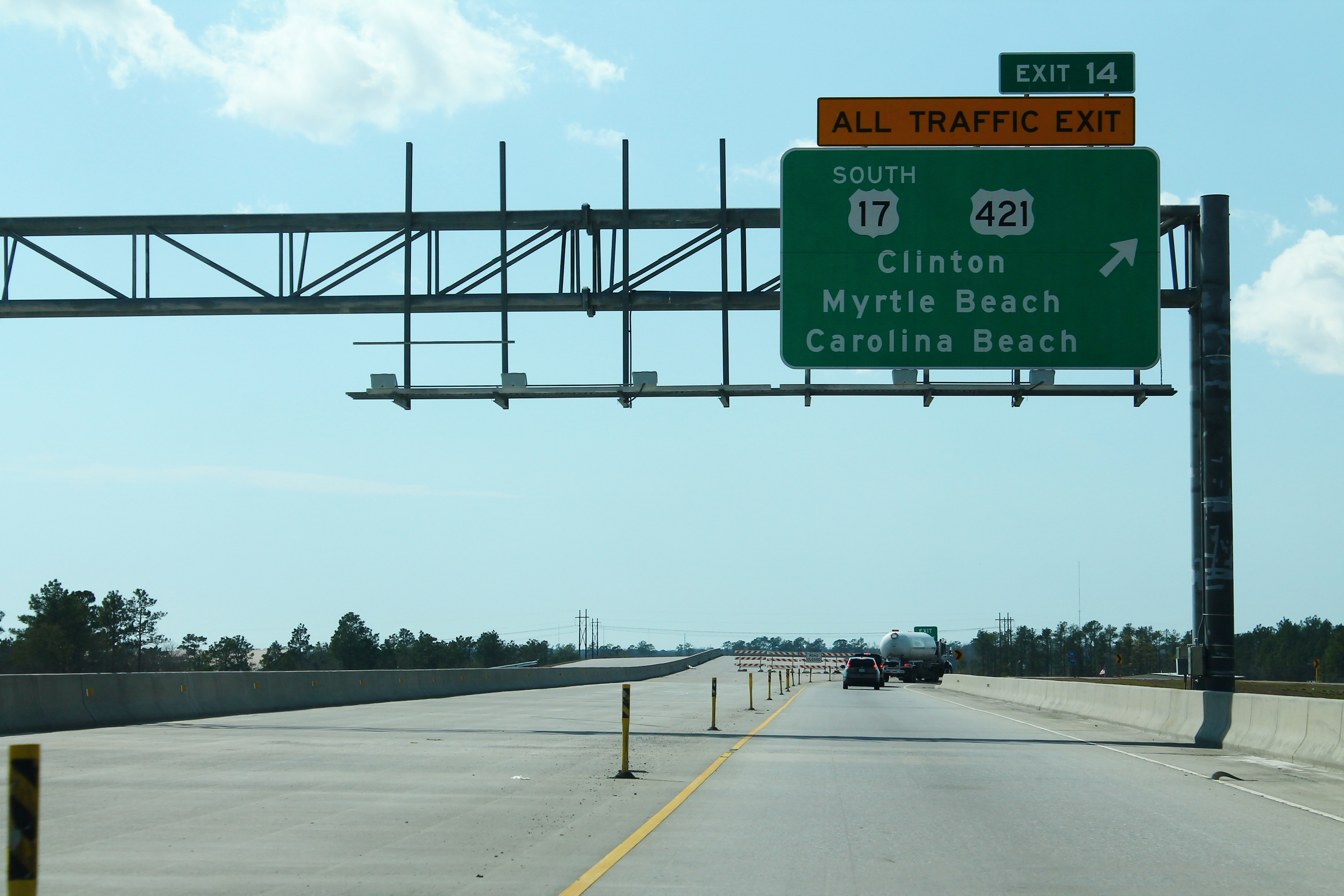
The former western terminus of I-140 at US 421 northwest of Wilmington

In June 2006, NCDOT announced two additional segments of the I-140 project would open by the end of the month. Costing $187 million (equivalent to $279 million in 2024) to complete, the US 17 expressway segment between Market Street and I-40 and the segment between NC 133 and US 421 both opened to traffic on June 30, 2006. Concurrent with its opening, the routing of US 17 through Wilmington was also moved to the newly opened expressway; the previous routing of US 17 through Wilmington was changed to U.S. Highway 17 Business (US 17 Bus.), and the U.S. Highway 17 Truck (US 17 Truck) designation was removed from Military Cutoff Road and Oleander Drive upon the opening of the bypass, with through trucks being directed to utilize the newly constructed freeway.

=== Brunswick County extension ===
Originally, the freeway was scheduled to be extended west from its current terminus at US 421 to US 74/US 76 first. However, in 2009, NCDOT announced plans to complete the segment between US 17 in Winnabow and US 74/US 76 before the central segment, which would require a bridge across the Cape Fear River. In response to this decision, town leaders from Navassa filed a discrimination complaint against NCDOT, claiming the town was frequently denied funding for infrastructure improvements and other projects. Planning for future construction continued, and, in March 2010, NCDOT awarded an $81.7-million (equivalent to $114 million in 2024) contract to Barnhill Contracting Company. The project involved the construction of the 6.118-mile (9.846 km) segment between the US 74/US 76 intersection and US 17 south of Leland. Construction of the segment began in March 2010 as a result of receiving partial funding through the American Recovery and Reinvestment Act.

As part of the expansion into Brunswick County, NCDOT designed several wildlife crossings to allow the black bear and other animals to safely cross the corridor in the vicinity of the Battle Royal Natural Heritage Site. The crossings included the extension of four bridges to provide some upland areas from animal crossings along water bodies and the construction of a 12-by-6-foot (3.7 by 1.8 m) wildlife tunnel just north of the US 74/US 76 interchange. The section between US 17 and US 74/US 76 was opened to traffic in September 2014.

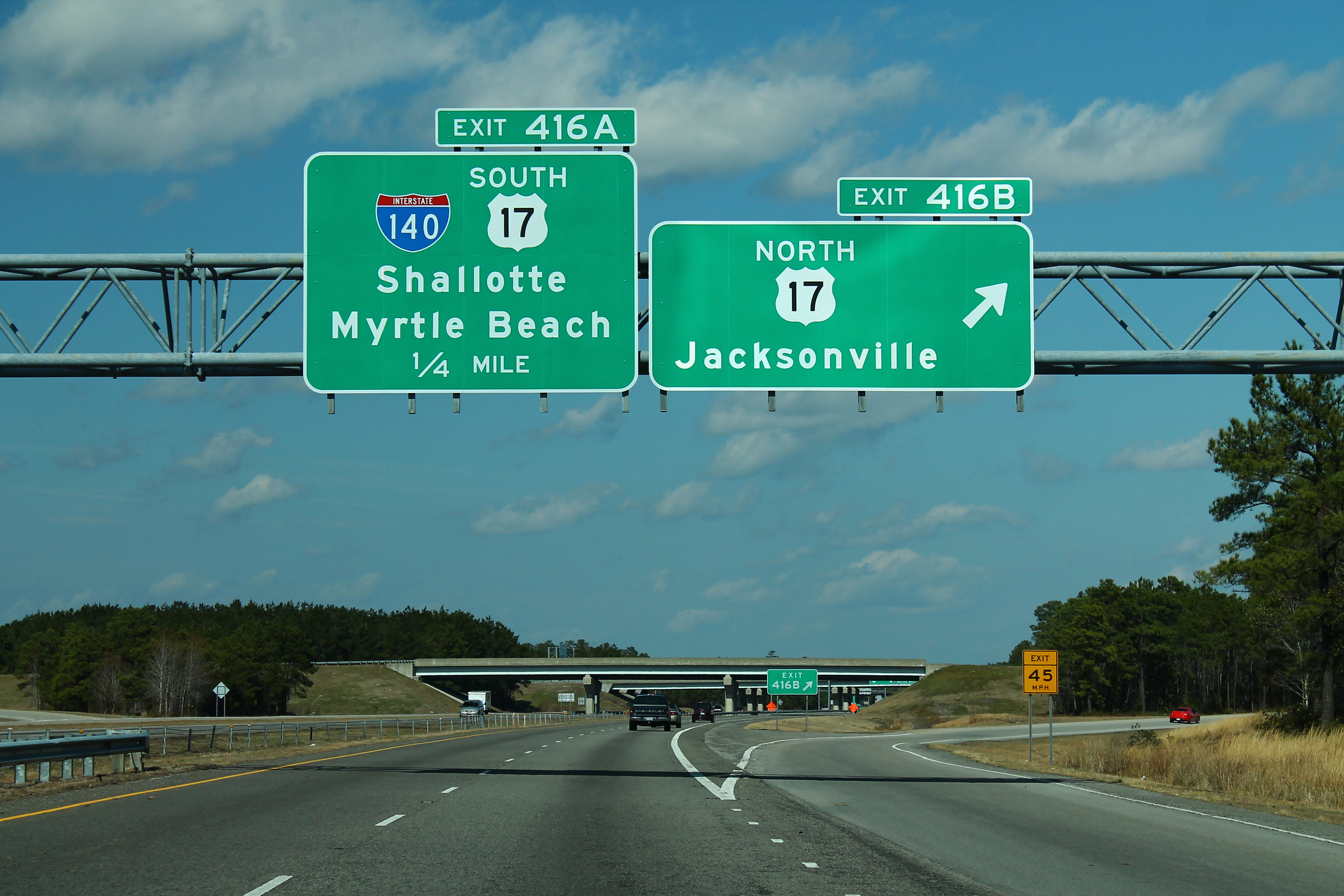
A former directional sign along I-40 showing I-140 and US 17 running concurrently to the west; this designation was removed in 2017.

With the opening of the Brunswick segment, NC 140 was routed along the entirety of the new freeway. On January 14, 2015, the Certification of Rulemaking was released, confirming the establishment of the new designation along not only the Brunswick segment but all existing and future sections of the Wilmington bypass. The justification in the paperwork for using NC 140 was it would serve as a temporary designation until the entire bypass was complete and the remaining segments could be submitted to AASHTO approval as I-140. The other rationalization was to provide an alternate designation for the entire bypass if a proposal to return US 17 to the streets of Wilmington was enacted. This was prevalent as only the New Hanover segment of I-140 was concurrent with US 17. NCDOT officials in the summer of 2014 called for returning US 17 to its original routing through Wilmington on Market Street, with the exception of placing a part of it on Military Cutoff Road and Oleander Drive. This was due to traffic volume on these roads being large enough to merit a route designation. The proposal was endorsed by the Wilmington Area Transportation Advisory Committee in August 2014. AASHTO's Special Committee on U.S. Route Numbering approved the request on May 14, 2015. On May 17, 2017, US 17 was officially rerouted through Wilmington.

On December 15, 2017, a ribbon-cutting ceremony was held for the final section of the freeway between US 74/US 76 and US 421, officially completing I-140 around Wilmington. However, this segment of road did not officially open to traffic until December 19, 2017, due to the road requiring final construction and cleanup. The section costed $204 million (equivalent to $256 million in 2024) and included two 1.4-mile-long (2.3 km) bridges over the Cape Fear River, with 300,000 short tons (270,000 long tons) of stone and 5,000,000 cubic yards (3,800,000 m^{3}) of fill material. I-140 was officially extended west to replace NC 140 between US 17 and US 74/US 76 on August 7, 2018.

== Future ==
In 2002, the North Carolina Board of Transportation appropriated $10 million for the construction of an interchange at Blue Clay Road. The interchange would serve in providing better access to both Wilmington International Airport and the Cape Fear Community College North Campus. There is currently no timeline for the completion of the interchange.

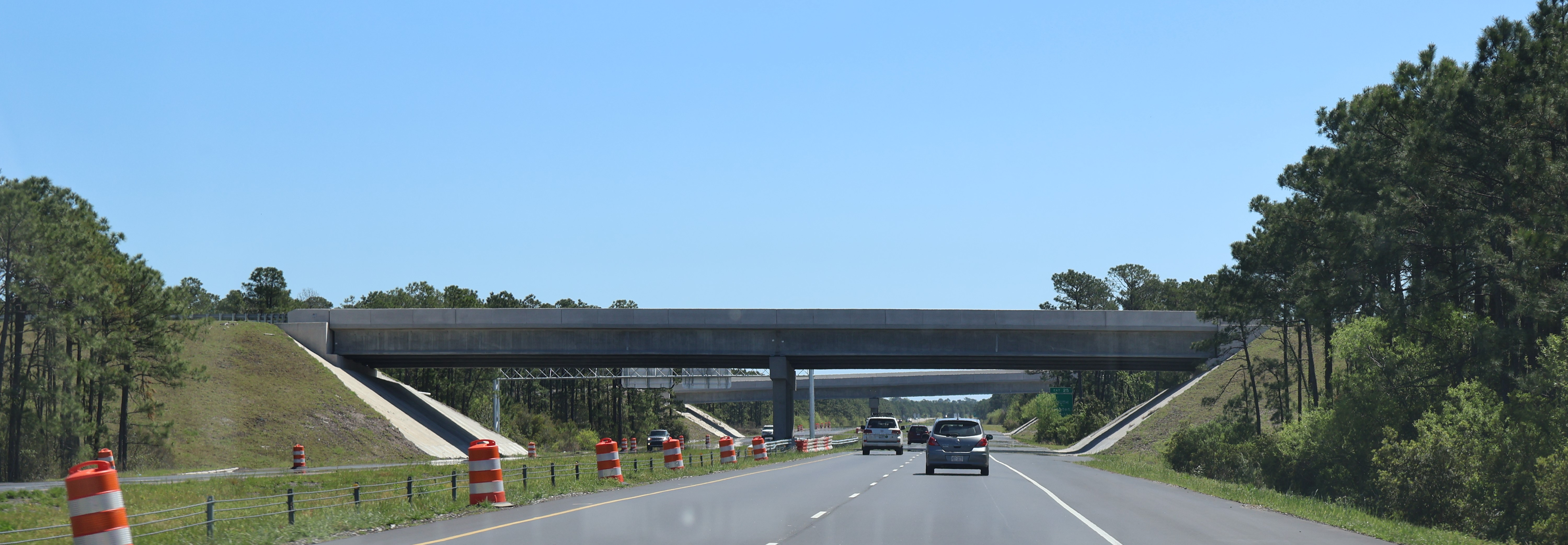
Construction of the US 17 Byp. (temporarily signed as NC 417)/NC 140 interchange in April 2023

An interchange is currently being constructed with the proposed Hampstead Bypass as part of the extension of Military Cutoff Road and Hampstead Bypass. Once completed, US 17 Byp. and I-140/NC 140 will form a bypass of US 17 from Winnabow to Hampstead. Construction on the Military Cutoff Road extension began in 2017, and opened to traffic on September 28, 2023. Work is expected to begin on the Hampstead Bypass north of NC 210 in late 2020, with construction of the segment between NC 140 and NC 210 beginning in 2023. Roadwork of the entire bypass is expected to be completed in 2030.

The proposed Cape Fear Crossing project is proposed to have its western terminus at I-140 in Brunswick County. The proposed freeway would extend east, crossing the Cape Fear River along a newly constructed bridge. The project is currently funded for right-of-way acquisition in the 2019–2029 State Transportation Improvement Plan. However, no construction funding is currently allocated to the project. Once funding is received, it would take approximately five years to complete.

== Exit list ==
County	Location	mi	km	Exit	Destinations	Notes
Brunswick		0.0	0.0	—	US 17 south to NC 87 – Shallotte, Myrtle Beach	Continuation as US 17
Brunswick		0.9	1.4	1	US 17 north – Wilmington, Leland	Left exit westbound
Brunswick	Leland	5.6	9.0	5	US 74 / US 76 – Leland, Whiteville	
Brunswick	Leland	8.0	12.9	8	Mount Misery Road	
Brunswick	Navassa	9.9	15.9	10	Cedar Hill Road – Navassa	
Cape Fear River		11.0	17.7	L. Bobby Brown Bridge		
New Hanover		13.1	21.1	14	US 421 – Clinton, Carolina Beach	
New Hanover	NE Cape Fear River	14.2	22.9	Dan Cameron Bridge		
New Hanover	Wrightsboro	17.0	27.4	17	NC 133 – Castle Hayne, Burgaw	
New Hanover	Murraysville	19.7	31.7	20	I-40 – Raleigh, Wilmington	Eastern end of I-140 and western end of NC 140; signed as exits 20A (west) and 20B (east) from westbound NC 140; to UNC Wilmington
New Hanover	Kirkland	22.2	35.7	23	NC 417 south (Military Cutoff Road)	Opened on September 28, 2023
New Hanover	Kirkland	24.8	39.9	25	US 17 south – Wilmington	
New Hanover	Kirkland	25.4	40.9	—	US 17 north – Jacksonville, New Bern	Road continues onto US 17
1.000 mi = 1.609 km; 1.000 km = 0.621 mi: Route transition; Unopened
