= Eagles Nest Airport (North Carolina) =

- IATA: none; ICAO: none; FAA LID: 6N9

Summary
- Airport type: Public use
- Owner: Elton Williams
- Serves: Potters Hill, North Carolina
- Elevation AMSL: 115 ft (35 m)
- Coordinates: 34°58′52″N 077°41′59″W

Map
- Location of airport in North Carolina

Runways
Direction	Length		Surface
Direction	ft	m	Surface
13/31	1,850	564	Turf
- Source: Federal Aviation Administration

Eagles Nest Airport (FAA LID: 6N9) is a privately owned, public use airport located in Potters Hill, a census-designated place in Duplin County, North Carolina, United States.

== Facilities ==
Eagles Nest Airport covers an area of 8 acres (3 ha) at an elevation of 115 feet (35 m) above mean sea level. It has one runway designated 13/31 with a turf surface measuring 1,850 by 75 feet (564 x 23 m).
