= Holly Shelter Swamp =

Pocosin in North Carolina, USA

Coordinates: 34°31′00″N 77°43′00″W

Holly Shelter Swamp is a pocosin in southern coastal North Carolina near Jacksonville, in Pender County. Much of the swamp is included in the 63,494-acre (25,695 ha) Holly Shelter Game Land, administered by the North Carolina Wildlife Resources Commission. The Bear Garden tract of the northern swamp has been logged and has a road grid. The swamp is drained by the Northeast Cape Fear River.
