= Duplin Winery =

North Carolina winery

- Location: Rose Hill, North Carolina, United States
- Coordinates: 34°49′50″N 78°1′27″W
- Appellation: North Carolina
- Founded: 1975
- Key people: Dave Fussell Jr. President/CEO Jonathan Fussell President Retail Operations Bill Hatcher Vice President of Sales
- Cases/yr: 450,000
- Known for: Hatteras Red
- Varietal: Muscadine
- Other products: Duplin Jams, Jellies and sauces, Nutra Grape. Health products from muscadine by products
- Distribution: regional (OH, VA, NC, SC, GA, WV, KY, TN, MD, DC, FL, DE, PA, AL, MS )
- Tasting: open to public
- Website: Official website

Duplin Winery is North Carolina's oldest operating winery, established in 1975. It is located in Duplin County, North Carolina, producing approximately 450,000 cases per year and is known primarily for muscadine wines.

A second and third locations were opened in North Myrtle Beach, South Carolina and Panama City Beach, Florida in 2015 and 2023, respectively.
