= Navassa, North Carolina =

- Town
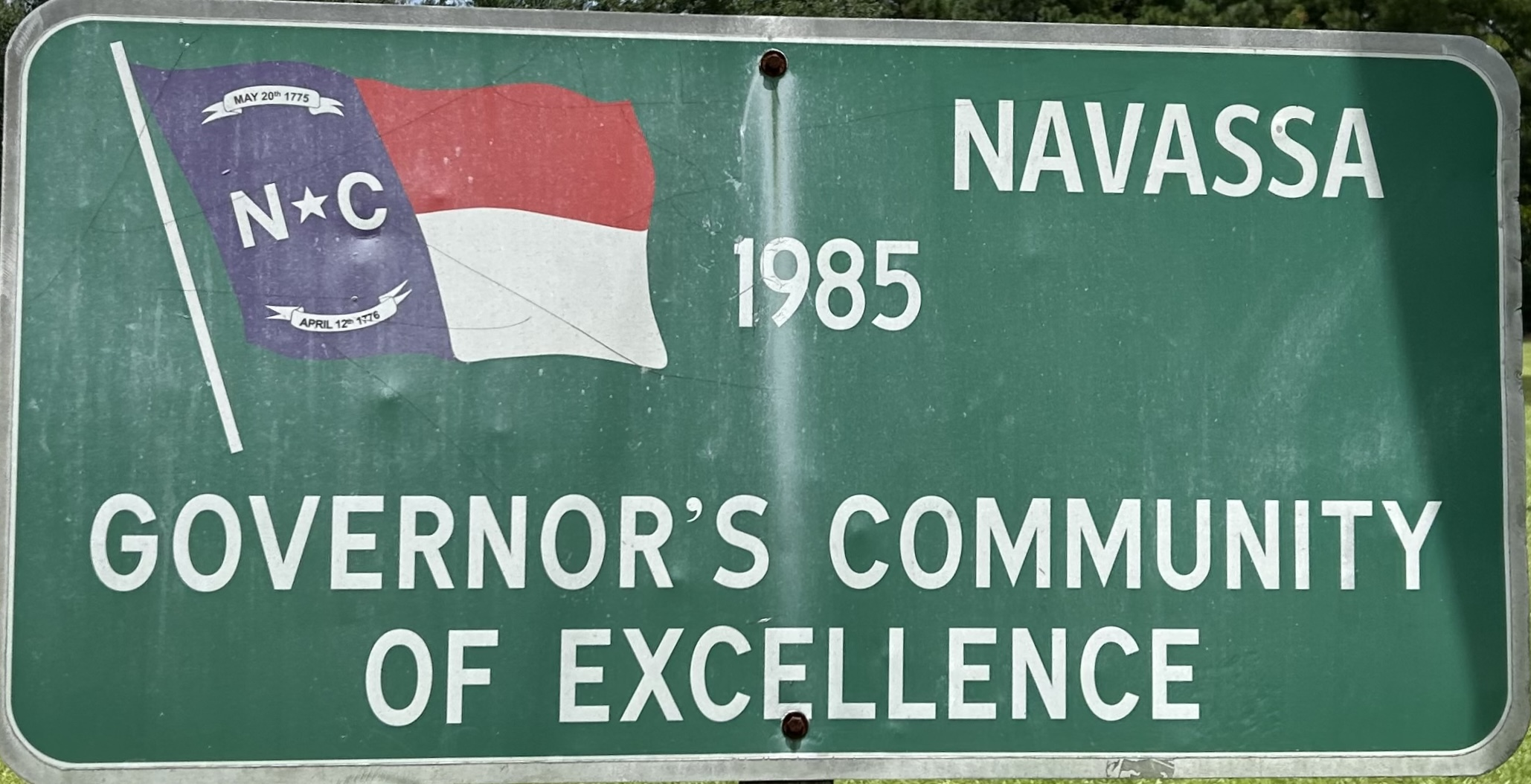
- Governor’s Community of Excellence

- Seal
- Motto: "People Working For People"
- Location within the state of North Carolina
- Coordinates: 34°15′51″N 77°59′39″W
- Country: United States
- State: North Carolina
- County: Brunswick
- Incorporated: 1977

Government
  - Mayor: Eulis Willis

Area
  - Total: 13.79 sq mi (35.71 km^{2})
  - Land: 13.33 sq mi (34.52 km^{2})
  - Water: 0.46 sq mi (1.19 km^{2})
- Elevation: 23 ft (7.0 m)

Population (2020)
  - Total: 1,367
  - Density: 103/sq mi (39.6/km^{2})
- Time zone: UTC-5 (Eastern (EST))
  - Summer (DST): UTC-4 (EDT)
- ZIP code: 28451
- Area codes: 910, 472
- FIPS code: 37-46060
- GNIS feature ID: 2406968
- Website: townofnavassa.org

Navassa is a town in Brunswick County, North Carolina, United States. As of the 2020 census, Navassa had a population of 1,367.

Navassa is part of the Wilmington, NC Metropolitan Statistical Area.

== History ==
A post office called Navassa was established in 1903. The community was named after Navassa Island. Navassa was incorporated as a town in 1977. Eulis Willis has served as mayor since 1999.

== Geography ==
Navassa is located along the Brunswick and Cape Fear rivers.

According to the United States Census Bureau, the town has a total area of 13.8 square miles (35.8 km^{2}), of which 13.3 square miles (34.5 km^{2}) is land and 0.50 square miles (1.3 km^{2}) (3.50%) is water.

=== Biodiversity ===
The Navassa and Cape Fear region in southeastern North Carolina is considered an exceptionally rich biodiverse area in the United States. This region hosts 50 different habitat types supporting 300 species of plants and animals. Twenty-two of these species are considered "endemic", meaning they are found nowhere else in the world. An assessment of biodiversity was completed by the State and prioritized terrestrial habitats based on the presence and quality of significant natural areas, rare species, important bird areas, high quality wildlife habitat, and wetlands. Aquatic habitats were assessed based on aquatic significant natural heritage areas, native trout waters, anadromous fish spawning areas, high quality benthic communities, high quality waters, outstanding resource waters, oyster sanctuaries, shellfish harvest areas, fish nursery areas, submerged aquatic vegetation, and stream buffers. Anadromous means that fish are born in fresh water nurseries of Navassa's creeks and rivers, spend most of their life in the sea (Atlantic Ocean) and return to the town's fresh waters to spawn.

The Cape Fear River and Brunswick River marshes along Navassa's eastern limits are an extensive 330 acres (130 ha) of tidal marshes upstream of saltwater influence. This tidal freshwater marsh is characterized by tall herbs, grasses and wildflowers. This site supports the only known population of Carolina Bishop Weed in North Carolina. The natural area has been altered by human influences of ditching, diking and roadbed construction. Sturgeon Creek, along Navassa's southern limits, is a tributary of the Brunswick River and supports the same uncommon natural community type of Tidal Freshwater Marsh. The 154-acre (62 ha) marsh contains a population of Cypress Knee Sedge, a rare plant species.

== Demographics ==
Historical population
Census	Pop.	Note	%±
1980	439		—
1990	445		1.4%
2000	479		7.6%
2010	1,505		214.2%
2020	1,367		−9.2%
2023 (est.)	1,737	▲	27.1%
U.S. Decennial Census

=== Racial and ethnic composition ===
Navassa town, North Carolina – Racial and ethnic composition Note: the US Census treats Hispanic/Latino as an ethnic category. This table excludes Latinos from the racial categories and assigns them to a separate category. Hispanics/Latinos may be of any race.
Race / Ethnicity (NH = Non-Hispanic)	Pop 2000	Pop 2010	Pop 2020	% 2000	% 2010	% 2020
White alone (NH)	58	351	381	12.11%	23.32%	27.87%
Black or African American alone (NH)	413	942	788	86.22%	62.59%	57.64%
Native American or Alaska Native alone (NH)	4	7	2	0.84%	0.47%	0.15%
Asian alone (NH)	0	2	4	0.00%	0.13%	0.29%
Native Hawaiian or Pacific Islander alone (NH)	0	0	4	0.00%	0.00%	0.29%
Other race alone (NH)	0	2	8	0.00%	0.13%	0.59%
Mixed race or Multiracial (NH)	2	51	41	0.42%	3.39%	3.00%
Hispanic or Latino (any race)	2	150	139	0.42%	9.97%	10.17%
Total	479	1,505	1,367	100.00%	100.00%	100.00%

=== 2020 census ===
As of the 2020 United States census, there were 1,367 people, 704 households, and 385 families residing in the town.

=== 2010 census ===
As of the census of 2010, there were 1,505 people living in the town. The racial makeup of the town was 27.1% White, 63.6% African American, 0.5% Native American, and 3.8% from two or more races. Hispanic or Latino of any race were 3.8% of the population.

There were 177 households, out of which 28.8% had children under the age of 18 living with them, 38.4% were married couples living together, 23.7% had a female householder with no husband present, and 30.5% were non-families. 26.0% of all households were made up of individuals, and 11.3% had someone living alone who was 65 years of age or older. The average household size was 2.71 and the average family size was 3.27.

In the town, the population was spread out, with 27.3% under the age of 18, 7.9% from 18 to 24, 26.9% from 25 to 44, 23.6% from 45 to 64, and 14.2% who were 65 years of age or older. The median age was 37 years. For every 100 females, there were 107.4 males. For every 100 females age 18 and over, there were 93.3 males.

The median income for a household in the town was $35,607, and the median income for a family was $35,179. Males had a median income of $21,875 versus $18,529 for females. The per capita income for the town was $11,328. About 24.8% of families and 27.1% of the population were below the poverty line, including 44.6% of those under age 18 and 14.5% of those age 65 or over.

== Culture ==
The town of Navassa has a rich cultural heritage supported by strong roots in the Gullah-Geeche culture. Gullah describes a group of African Americans along the southeast coast of the United States from Jacksonville, North Carolina, to Jacksonville, Florida. They have a distinct culture, language, and lifestyle that have been preserved since the early 1700s. In the southeastern North Carolina area, the Gullah people of today are direct descendants of slaves who worked in the rice and peanut plantations of the Cape Fear River valley. Residents of Navassa have a direct link to this culture. At one time there were five different rice plantations in what is today Navassa. As the plantation system came to a close, the slaves who worked these plantations eventually resettled the area.

In 2006, the US Congress established the east coast Gullah-Geeche Cultural Heritage Corridor to help preserve and educated the public on the importance of this culture in our history. The corridor is preserved with the assistance of an executive committee, of which the Mayor of Navassa is vice-chairman.
