= Goshen Swamp =

American creek swamp

Coordinates: 35°00′49″N 77°50′28″W

Goshen Swamp is a blackwater creek swamp located in Duplin County, North Carolina, near the towns of Faison and Calypso. It is a tributary of the Northeast Cape Fear River and has a watershed area of 479 km^{2}.
