= Fair and Equitable Tobacco Reform Act =

The Fair and Equitable Tobacco Reform Act is a component of the American Jobs Creation Act, passed in the United States in October 2004. The main component of the Fair and Equitable Tobacco Reform Act is the Tobacco Transition Payment Program (TTPP, otherwise known as the "Tobacco Buyout"), which was formalized by the United States Department of Agriculture in February 2005.

== Tobacco Transition Payment Program ==
The Tobacco Buyout ended all aspects of the federal tobacco marketing quota and price support loan programs that were established by the Agricultural Adjustment Act in 1938. Beginning in 2005, there were no planting restrictions, no marketing cards, and no price support loans, all traditional components of tobacco agriculture in the United States. Along with the end of these policies, the Tobacco Buyout also entails the TTPP, which provides payments to tobacco quota holders and tobacco producers from 2005 to 2014.
