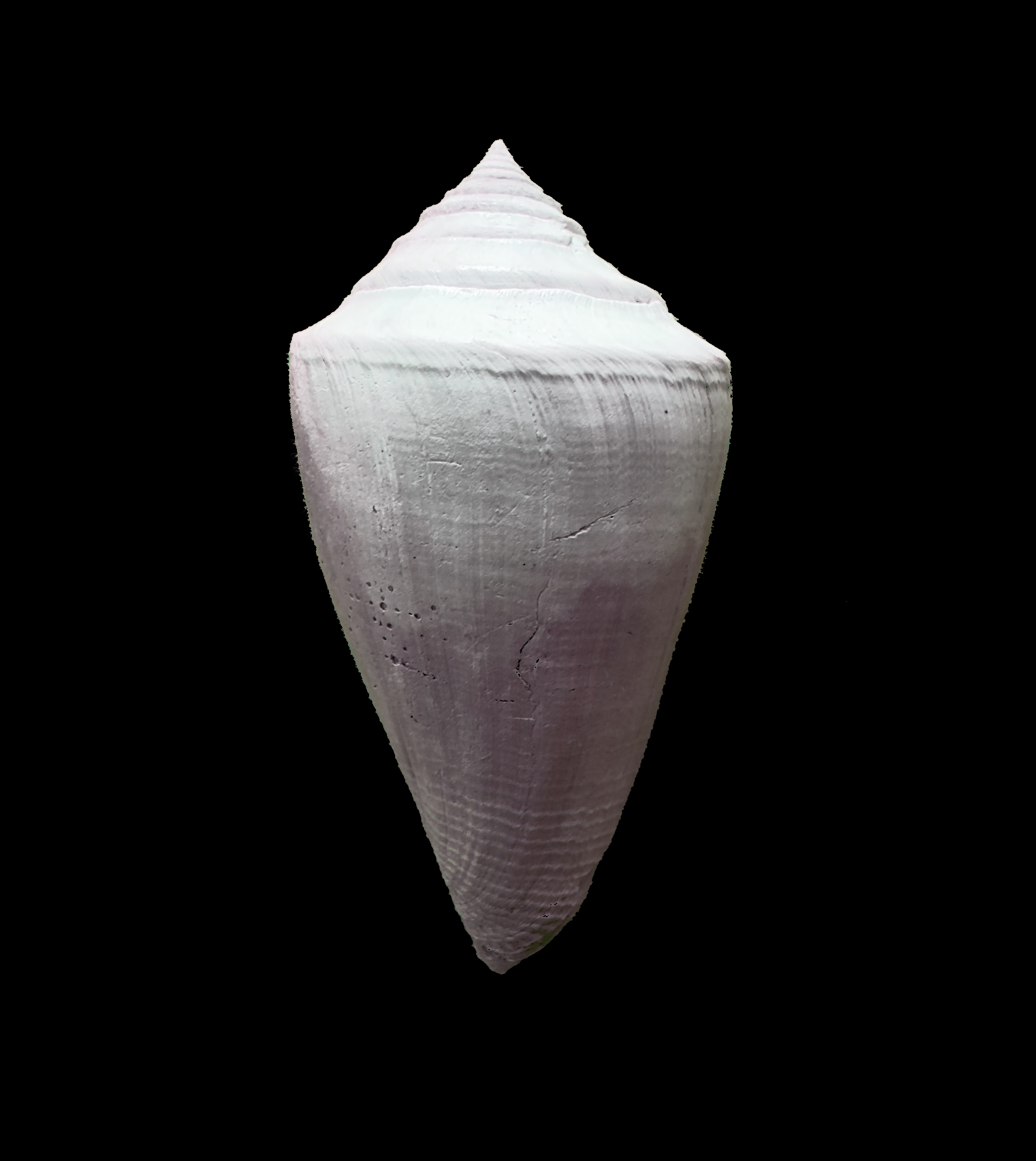

Scientific classification
- Kingdom: Animalia
- Phylum: Mollusca
- Class: Gastropoda
- Subclass: Caenogastropoda
- Order: Neogastropoda
- Family: Conidae
- Genus: Contraconus; Olsson & Harbison 1953

Type species
- † Conus adversarius Conrad, 1840

Synonyms
- †Conus (Contraconus)

= Contraconus =

Contraconus Temporal range: Miocene–Pleistocene

Genus of Gastropoda

Contraconus is a genus of extinct venomous cone snails from Florida. The type species was discovered in 1840 by Timothy Abbott Conrad. It was originally described as a subgenus of Conus.
