= Dan Cameron Bridge =

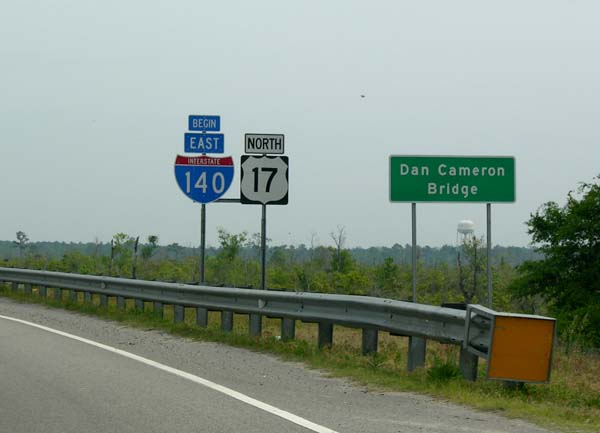
- Begin East I-140 and the Dan Cameron Bridge, at the US 421 interchange
- Coordinates: 34.3011°N 77.9571°W
- Carries: I-140 (4 lanes)
- Crosses: Northeast Cape Fear River and US 421
- Locale: Wilmington, North Carolina
- Named for: Dan Cameron
- Owner: NCDOT
- Maintained by: NCDOT

Characteristics
- Design: Box girder bridge
- Total length: 7,402.3 feet (2,256.2 m)
- Width: 107.6 feet (32.8 m)
- Clearance below: 65.0 feet (19.8 m)

History
- Opened: 2005

Statistics
- Daily traffic: 16,000 (as of 2011)

Location
- Interactive map of Dan Cameron Bridge

The Dan Cameron Bridge is a four-lane automobile bridge spanning the Northeast Cape Fear River and US 421, located in New Hanover County. The bridge carries I-140 and is named after Dan Cameron, who was a successful civic leader, businessman and one-term mayor of Wilmington from 1955 to 1957.
