= Duplin County, North Carolina =

County in North Carolina, United States

- County
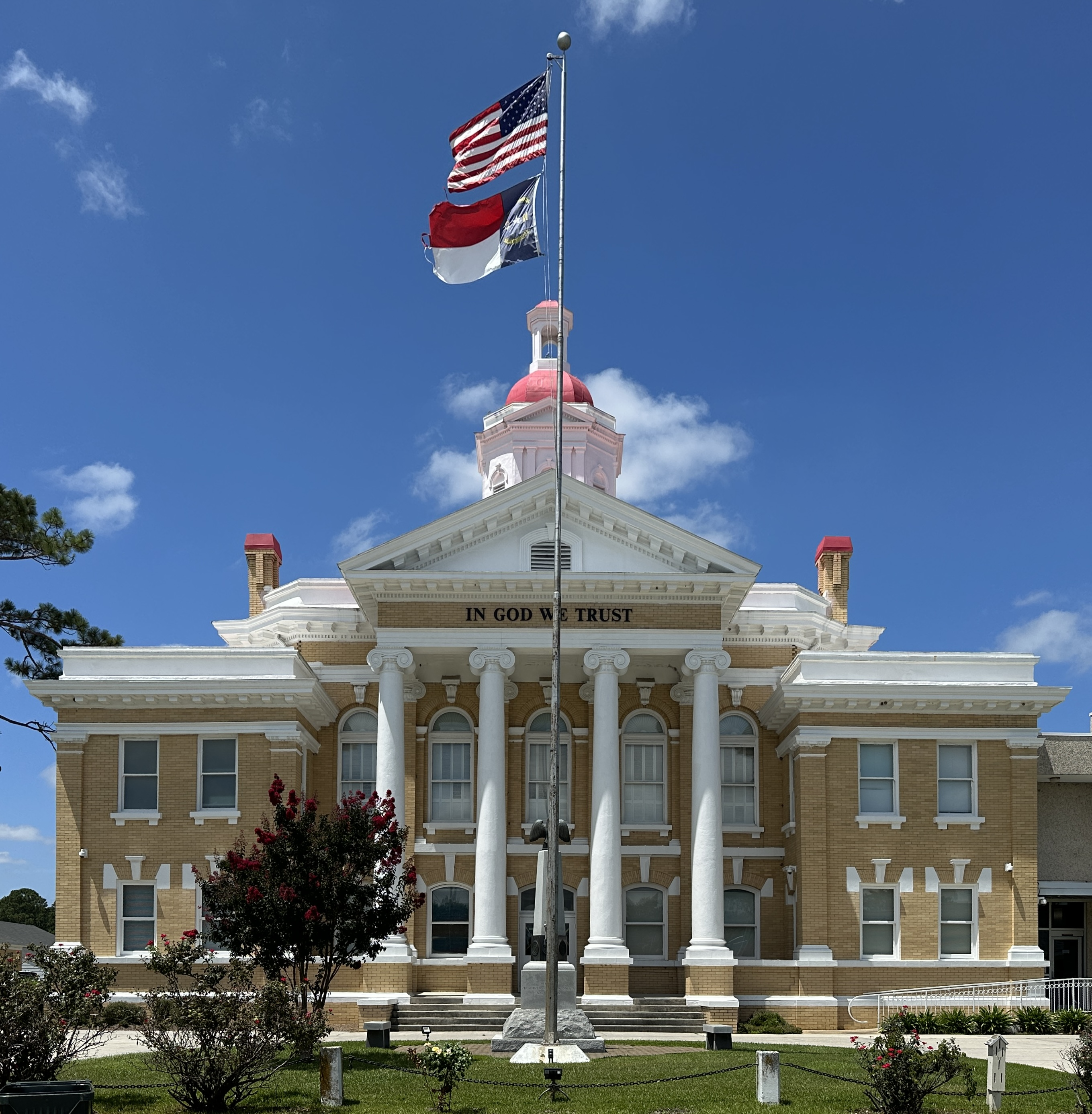
- Duplin County Courthouse in Kenansville

- Flag Seal Logo

- Location within the U.S. state of North Carolina
- Interactive map of Duplin County, North Carolina
- Coordinates: 34.93°N 77.93°W
- Country: United States
- State: North Carolina
- Founded: 1750
- Named for: Thomas Hay, Viscount Dupplin
- Seat: Kenansville
- Largest community: Wallace

Area
  - Total: 820.22 sq mi (2,124.4 km^{2})
  - Land: 814.72 sq mi (2,110.1 km^{2})
  - Water: 5.50 sq mi (14.2 km^{2}) 0.67%

Population (2020)
  - Total: 48,715
  - Estimate (2025): 51,571 ▲
  - Density: 59.8/sq mi (23.1/km^{2})
- Time zone: UTC−5 (Eastern)
  - Summer (DST): UTC−4 (EDT)
- Congressional district: 3rd
- Website: www.duplinnc.gov

Duplin County (/ˈduːp.lɪn/ DOOP-lin) is a county located in the U.S. state of North Carolina. As of the 2020 census, its population was 48,715. Its county seat is Kenansville.

== History ==
The county was formed in 1750 from New Hanover County. It was named for Thomas Hay, Viscount Dupplin (later 9th Earl of Kinnoull), as he was known when he served on the Board of Trade and Plantations in England in the 1740s.

In 1784, the western part of Duplin County became Sampson County.

John Miller, a merchant in Duplin, was appointed as postmaster. In the 19th century, he migrated to Leon County in the panhandle of Florida, with other North Carolinians during the period of Indian Removal in the 1830s–1840s. There, he developed a successful cotton plantation. He called it Miccosukee Plantation, after one of the Seminole bands. (They are now a federally recognized tribe.)

== Geography ==
According to the U.S. Census Bureau, the county has a total area of 820.22 square miles (2,124.4 km^{2}), of which 5.50 square miles (14.2 km^{2}) (0.67%) are covered by water.

=== State and local protected area ===
- Angola Bay Game Land (part)
- Cabin Lake County Park

=== Major water bodies ===
- Doctors Creek
- Goshen Swamp
- Groove Creek
- Island Creek
- Limestone Creek
- Little Limestone Creek
- Maxwell Creek
- Millers Creek
- Northeast Cape Fear River
- Stewards Creek

=== Adjacent counties ===
- Wayne County – north
- Lenoir County – northeast
- Jones County – east
- Onslow County – east
- Pender County – south
- Sampson County – west

=== Major highways ===
- I-40
- Future I-795
- US 117
- US 117 Alt.
- US 117 Conn.
- US 421
- NC 11
- NC 24
- NC 24 Bus.
- NC 41
- NC 50
- NC 111
- NC 241
- NC 403
- NC 903

=== Major infrastructure ===
- Duplin County Airport
- Eagles Nest Airport
- Henderson Field Airport (ACZ)

== Climate ==
Duplin County is located in the humid subtropical climate (Köppen climate classification Cfa) zone, with mostly moderate temperatures year round. Winters are mild across Duplin, with the warmest winter temperatures found in the southeastern areas of the county due to the influence of the nearby Atlantic Ocean. The average high temperature in January is around 55 °F (13 °C). Summers are hot and humid, with the hottest summer temperatures found in the northern areas of Duplin County. The average high temperature in July is around 90 °F (32 °C).

The USDA hardiness zone for Duplin County is Zone 8A (10 °F to 15 °F or -12 °C to -9 °C).

== Demographics ==
Historical population
| Census | Pop. | Note | %± |
|---|---|---|---|
| 1790 | 5,663 | | — |
| 1800 | 6,796 | | 20.0% |
| 1810 | 7,863 | | 15.7% |
| 1820 | 9,744 | | 23.9% |
| 1830 | 11,291 | | 15.9% |
| 1840 | 11,182 | | −1.0% |
| 1850 | 13,514 | | 20.9% |
| 1860 | 15,784 | | 16.8% |
| 1870 | 15,542 | | −1.5% |
| 1880 | 18,773 | | 20.8% |
| 1890 | 18,690 | | −0.4% |
| 1900 | 22,405 | | 19.9% |
| 1910 | 25,442 | | 13.6% |
| 1920 | 30,223 | | 18.8% |
| 1930 | 35,103 | | 16.1% |
| 1940 | 39,739 | | 13.2% |
| 1950 | 41,074 | | 3.4% |
| 1960 | 40,270 | | −2.0% |
| 1970 | 38,015 | | −5.6% |
| 1980 | 40,952 | | 7.7% |
| 1990 | 39,995 | | −2.3% |
| 2000 | 49,063 | | 22.7% |
| 2010 | 58,505 | | 19.2% |
| 2020 | 48,715 | | −16.7% |
| 2025 (est.) | 51,571 | ▲ | 5.9% |
U.S. Decennial Census; 1790–1960 1900–1990; 1990–2000 2010 2020

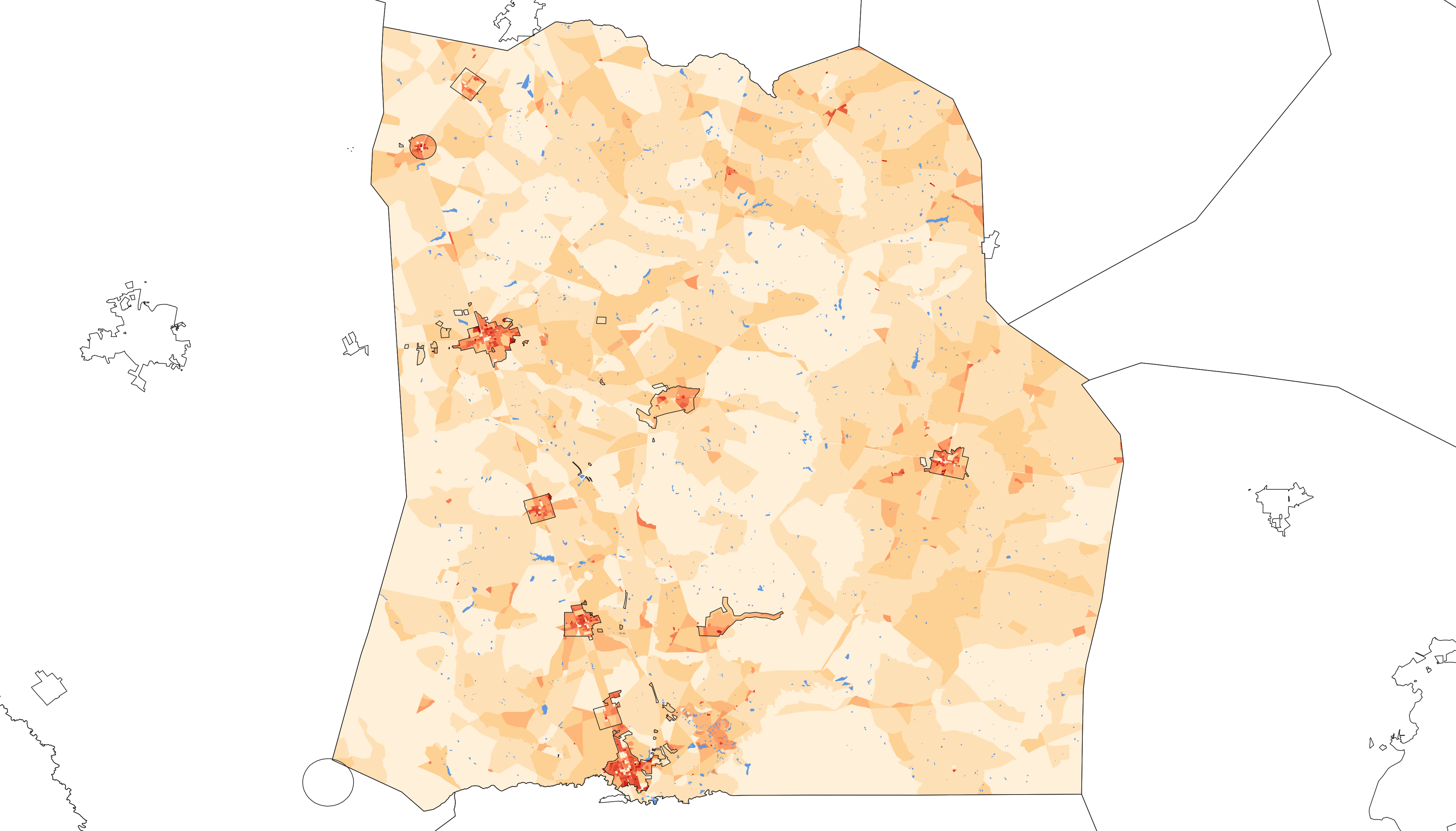
2020 population density of Duplin County NC by census block

=== Racial and ethnic composition ===
Duplin County, North Carolina – Racial and ethnic composition Note: the US Census treats Hispanic/Latino as an ethnic category. This table excludes Latinos from the racial categories and assigns them to a separate category. Hispanics/Latinos may be of any race.
| Race / Ethnicity (NH = Non-Hispanic) | Pop 1980 | Pop 1990 | Pop 2000 | Pop 2010 | Pop 2020 | % 1980 | % 1990 | % 2000 | % 2010 | % 2020 |
|---|---|---|---|---|---|---|---|---|---|---|
| White alone (NH) | 26,733 | 25,635 | 27,094 | 30,959 | 24,945 | 65.28% | 64.10% | 55.22% | 52.92% | 51.21% |
| Black or African American alone (NH) | 13,852 | 13,200 | 14,116 | 14,640 | 11,437 | 33.82% | 33.00% | 28.77% | 25.02% | 23.48% |
| Native American or Alaska Native alone (NH) | 51 | 97 | 90 | 173 | 154 | 0.12% | 0.24% | 0.18% | 0.30% | 0.32% |
| Asian alone (NH) | 19 | 44 | 73 | 135 | 155 | 0.05% | 0.11% | 0.15% | 0.23% | 0.32% |
| Native Hawaiian or Pacific Islander alone (NH) | x | x | 20 | 28 | 4 | x | x | 0.04% | 0.05% | 0.01% |
| Other race alone (NH) | 16 | 4 | 15 | 46 | 120 | 0.04% | 0.01% | 0.03% | 0.08% | 0.25% |
| Mixed race or Multiracial (NH) | x | x | 229 | 465 | 1,087 | x | x | 0.47% | 0.79% | 2.23% |
| Hispanic or Latino (any race) | 281 | 1,015 | 7,426 | 12,059 | 10,813 | 0.69% | 2.54% | 15.14% | 20.61% | 22.20% |
| Total | 40,952 | 39,995 | 49,063 | 58,505 | 48,715 | 100.00% | 100.00% | 100.00% | 100.00% | 100.00% |

=== 2020 census ===
As of the 2020 census, 48,715 people, 19,195 households, and 14,504 families resided in the county. The median age was 41.2 years, with 24.0% of residents under the age of 18 and 19.5% aged 65 or older.

For every 100 females, there were 95.1 males, and for every 100 females age 18 and over there were 91.5 males age 18 or over.

The racial makeup of the county was 53.5% White, 23.8% Black or African American, 1.0% American Indian and Alaska Native, 0.4% Asian, less than 0.1% Native Hawaiian and Pacific Islander, 14.8% from some other race, and 6.4% from two or more races. Hispanic or Latino residents of any race comprised 22.2% of the population.

Less than 0.1% of residents lived in urban areas, while 100.0% lived in rural areas.

Of the 19,195 households, 31.5% had children under the age of 18 living in them, 44.9% were married-couple households, 18.7% were households with a male householder and no spouse or partner present, and 30.8% were households with a female householder and no spouse or partner present. About 28.9% of all households were made up of individuals and 14.3% had someone living alone who was 65 years of age or older.

There were 23,704 housing units, of which 19.0% were vacant. Among occupied housing units, 70.7% were owner-occupied and 29.3% were renter-occupied. The homeowner vacancy rate was 1.0% and the rental vacancy rate was 6.3%.

=== 2000 census ===
At the 2000 census, 49,063 people, 18,267 households, and 13,060 families were residing in the county. The population density was 60 people per square mile (23 people/km^{2}). The 20,520 housing units had an average density of 25 units per square mile (9.7 units/km^{2}). The racial makeup of the county was 58.67% White, 28.94% African American, 0.23% Native American, 0.15% Asian, 0.07% Pacific Islander, 10.87% from other races, and 1.06% from two or more races. About 15.14% of the population were Hispanics or Latinos of any race.

Of the 18,267 households, 33.2% had children under 18 living with them, 52.2% were married couples living together, 14.2% had a female householder with no husband present, and 28.5% were not families. About 24.5% of all households were made up of individuals, and 11.1% had someone living alone who was 65 or older. The average household size was 2.63 and the average family size was 3.10.

In the county, the age distribution was 26.1% under 18, 9.6% from 18 to 24, 29.3% from 25 to 44, 22.1% from 45 to 64, and 12.9% who were 65 or older. The median age was 35 years. For every 100 females, there were 98.3 males. For every 100 females 18 and over, there were 95.6 males.

The median income for a household in the county was $29,890, and for a family was $34,760. Males had a median income of $26,212 versus $20,063 for females. The per capita income for the county was $14,499. About 15.30% of families and 19.40% of the population were below the poverty line, including 22.50% of those under age 18 and 22.70% of those 65 or over.

== Government and politics ==
Duplin County is a member of the regional Eastern Carolina Council of Governments. It is represented by Senator William Brent Jackson, a Republican member of the North Carolina Senate, in the 10th district and Jimmy Dixon, a Republican member of the North Carolina House of Representatives, in the 4th district.

United States presidential election results for Duplin County, North Carolina
| Year | Republican | | Democratic | | Third party(ies) | |
| Year | No. | % | No. | % | No. | % |
|---|---|---|---|---|---|---|
| 1912 | 33 | 1.15% | 1,757 | 61.46% | 1,069 | 37.39% |
| 1916 | 1,527 | 45.57% | 1,824 | 54.43% | 0 | 0.00% |
| 1920 | 2,697 | 44.25% | 3,398 | 55.75% | 0 | 0.00% |
| 1924 | 1,542 | 34.24% | 2,924 | 64.93% | 37 | 0.82% |
| 1928 | 2,911 | 52.37% | 2,647 | 47.63% | 0 | 0.00% |
| 1932 | 1,173 | 19.94% | 4,674 | 79.46% | 35 | 0.60% |
| 1936 | 1,546 | 20.58% | 5,966 | 79.42% | 0 | 0.00% |
| 1940 | 1,260 | 18.94% | 5,394 | 81.06% | 0 | 0.00% |
| 1944 | 1,437 | 20.82% | 5,464 | 79.18% | 0 | 0.00% |
| 1948 | 1,024 | 14.18% | 5,866 | 81.25% | 330 | 4.57% |
| 1952 | 2,115 | 24.86% | 6,392 | 75.14% | 0 | 0.00% |
| 1956 | 2,110 | 23.34% | 6,931 | 76.66% | 0 | 0.00% |
| 1960 | 2,953 | 28.89% | 7,269 | 71.11% | 0 | 0.00% |
| 1964 | 3,821 | 34.77% | 7,169 | 65.23% | 0 | 0.00% |
| 1968 | 2,724 | 22.22% | 3,451 | 28.16% | 6,082 | 49.62% |
| 1972 | 7,153 | 70.61% | 2,857 | 28.20% | 120 | 1.18% |
| 1976 | 3,912 | 33.45% | 7,696 | 65.81% | 86 | 0.74% |
| 1980 | 5,403 | 41.34% | 7,524 | 57.57% | 142 | 1.09% |
| 1984 | 7,708 | 52.96% | 6,830 | 46.93% | 17 | 0.12% |
| 1988 | 5,774 | 49.24% | 5,945 | 50.70% | 7 | 0.06% |
| 1992 | 5,286 | 38.45% | 6,816 | 49.58% | 1,645 | 11.97% |
| 1996 | 5,432 | 43.83% | 6,179 | 49.86% | 781 | 6.30% |
| 2000 | 7,840 | 54.48% | 6,475 | 45.00% | 75 | 0.52% |
| 2004 | 9,611 | 57.96% | 6,923 | 41.75% | 49 | 0.30% |
| 2008 | 10,834 | 54.43% | 8,958 | 45.01% | 112 | 0.56% |
| 2012 | 11,416 | 55.44% | 9,033 | 43.87% | 143 | 0.69% |
| 2016 | 12,217 | 58.58% | 8,283 | 39.72% | 356 | 1.71% |
| 2020 | 13,793 | 60.72% | 8,767 | 38.60% | 155 | 0.68% |
| 2024 | 14,677 | 64.10% | 8,057 | 35.19% | 164 | 0.72% |

== Economy ==
Duplin County is important in raising animals for food. It has more hogs than any other county in the United States—2.2 million in 1998, which is greater than the hog population of most states. The county is also the home to a major chicken and turkey industry.

Duplin County is also home to Duplin Winery, the oldest winery in North Carolina and the largest winery in the Southeast.

== Education ==
Duplin County is home to James Sprunt Community College.

Duplin County Schools oversees 16 schools.

== Communities ==
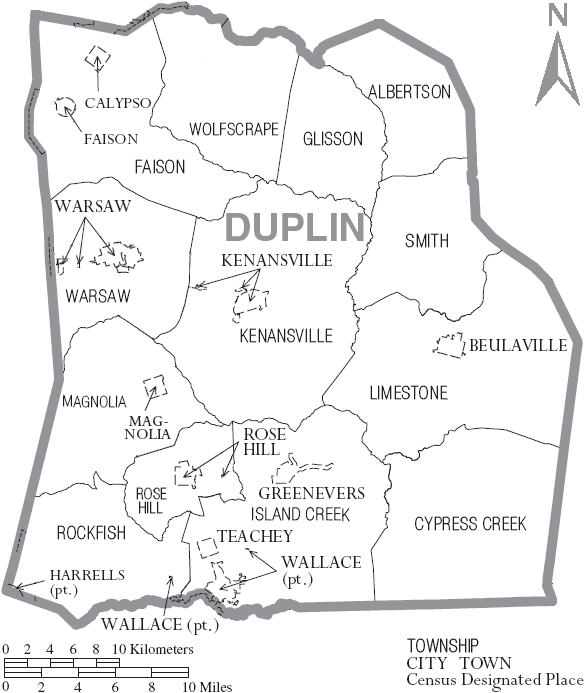
Map of Duplin County with municipal and township labels

=== Towns ===
- Beulaville
- Calypso
- Faison (part)
- Greenevers
- Harrells (part)
- Kenansville (county seat)
- Magnolia
- Mount Olive (part)
- Rose Hill
- Teachey
- Wallace (largest community; parts within Pender County)
- Warsaw

=== Townships ===
- Albertson
- Cypress Creek
- Faison
- Glisson
- Island Creek
- Kenansville
- Limestone
- Magnolia
- Rockfish
- Rose Hill
- Smith
- Warsaw
- Wolfscrape

=== Census-designated places ===
- Bowdens
- Chinquapin
- Potters Hill

=== Unincorporated communities ===
- Fountaintown
- Hallsville
- Kornegay
- Murphey
- Sarecta

== Notable people ==
- Caleb Bradham (1867–1934), an American pharmacist, is best known as the inventor of the soft drink Pepsi. Bradham was born in Chinquapin.
- Benjamin F. Grady (1831–1914), a U.S. congressman, author, teacher, and farmer, was born near Sarecta on October 10, 1831. He taught mathematics and natural sciences at Austin College in Texas when the Civil War begann and was the superintendent of public instruction for Duplin County from 1881 to 1890. In 1891, he was elected for two terms as U.S. representative for North Carolina's 3rd congressional district.
- James Kenan (1740–1810) was a colonial and state official, Revolutionary officer, founder of Kenansville, and sheriff of Duplin County. Kenan was born in Turkey, North Carolina, at his father's plantation, the Lilacs.
- Peter Weddick Moore (1859–1934), a North Carolina educator and the first president of Elizabeth City State University, was born near Faison, to Weddick and Alecy Thompson Moore, who were both enslaved African Americans.
- Charles S. Murphy (1909–1983), an American attorney, served as the White House Counsel to U.S. President Harry S. Truman from 1950 to 1953, and during the Kennedy and Johnson administrations as Undersecretary of Agriculture, from 1960 to 1965; he was chairman of the Civil Aeronautics Board from 1965 to 1968. Murphy was born on a farm in Wallace.
- Parker David Robbins (1834–1917) was an American soldier, legislator, inventor, and postmaster. He was of African and Native American descent and considered a "free black". In 1877, he moved to Duplin County and established a cotton gin and sawmill, and built a steamboat. Robbins was born in Bertie County.
- Ruth Faison Shaw (1889–1969), American artist and educator, is credited with introducing finger painting into the United States' education system. She was born in Kenansville.

== See also ==
- List of counties in North Carolina
- National Register of Historic Places listings in Duplin County, North Carolina
