= Potters Hill, North Carolina =

- Census-designated place
- Location within the state of North Carolina
- Coordinates: 34°58′6″N 77°42′38″W
- Country: United States
- State: North Carolina
- County: Duplin

Area
  - Total: 5.36 sq mi (13.87 km^{2})
  - Land: 5.35 sq mi (13.86 km^{2})
  - Water: 0 sq mi (0.00 km^{2})
- Elevation: 92 ft (28 m)

Population (2020)
  - Total: 437
  - Density: 81.6/sq mi (31.52/km^{2})
- Time zone: UTC-5 (Eastern (EST))
  - Summer (DST): UTC-4 (EDT)
- Area codes: 910, 472
- GNIS feature ID: 1025627

Potters Hill is an unincorporated community and census-designated place (CDP) in Duplin County, North Carolina, United States. At the 2020 census, the population was 437.

Potters Hill is located in eastern Duplin County along North Carolina Highway 41, which leads northeast 5 miles (8 km) to U.S. Route 258 and southwest 5 miles (8 km) to North Carolina Highway 24 at Beulaville. The northeastern portion of the Potters Hill CDP is adjacent to Jones and Onslow counties.

Historical population
Census	Pop.	Note	%±
2020	437		—
U.S. Decennial Census
