= Northeast Cape Fear River =

Stream in North Carolina, USA

Northeast Cape Fear River Tributary to Cape Fear River
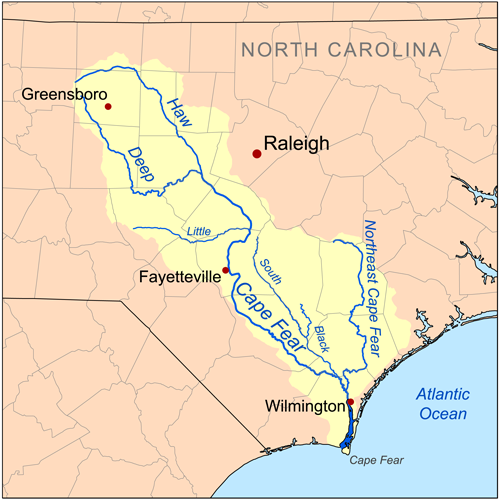
- Map of the Cape Fear River drainage basin showing the Northeast Cape Fear River

- Location of Northeast Cape Fear River mouth Northeast Cape Fear River (the United States)

Location
- Country: United States
- State: North Carolina
- Counties: Duplin; Lenoir; New Hanover; Pender; Wayne

Physical characteristics
- Source: divide between Northeast Cape Fear River and Goshen Swamp
  - location: about 1 mile southeast of Mount Olive, North Carolina
  - coordinates: 35°10′19″N 078°02′36″W
  - elevation: 146 ft (45 m)
- Mouth: Cape Fear River
  - location: Wilmington, North Carolina
  - coordinates: 34°14′28″N 077°57′14″W
  - elevation: 0 ft (0 m)
- Length: 131.25 mi (211.23 km)
- Basin size: 1,714.70 square miles (4,441.1 km^{2})
- Discharge
  - location: Cape Fear River
  - average: 2,090.03 cu ft/s (59.183 m^{3}/s) at mouth with Cape Fear River

Basin features
- Progression: Cape Fear River → Atlantic Ocean
- River system: Cape Fear River
- Tributaries
  - left: Poley Branch; Jumping Run; Great Branch; Matthews Creek; Burn Coat Creek; White Oak Branch; Tandam Branch; Jump and Run Branch; Limestone Creek; Muddy Creek; Cypress Creek; Holly Shelter Creek; Ashes Creek; Lillington Creek; Harrisons Creek; Island Creek; Ness Creek; Smith Creek
  - right: Rattlesnake Branch; Polly Run Creek; Mire Branch; Beaverdam Branch; Horsepen Branch; Sandy Run; Camp Branch; Housland Branch; Goshen Swamp; Grey Run; Welch Branch; Dark Branch; Grove Creek; Stocking Head Creek; Island Creek; Oakie Branch; Rockfish Creek; Washington Creek; Lewis Creek; Watermelon Run; Burgaw Creek; Cypress Creek; McIntire Creek; Pike Creek; Old Creek; Turkey Creek; Long Creek; Cowpen Branch; Tonys Creek; Lagoon Creek

Northeast Cape Fear River is a 131.2 mi (211.1 km) long 5th order tributary to the Cape Fear River in southeastern North Carolina.

== Variant names ==
According to the Geographic Names Information System, it has also been known historically as:

- North East River
- Northeast Fork

== Course ==
Northeast Cape Fear River rises about 1 mile southeast of Mount Olive, North Carolina in Wayne County and about 10 mi (16 km) south of Goldsboro and then flows south to the Cape Fear River at Wilmington, North Carolina. On its course it flows past Albertson, Hallsville, and Chinquapin. In Pender County near the Atlantic coast, it passes along the west side of Angola Swamp and Holly Shelter Swamp. It joins the Cape Fear River on the north end of Wilmington, forming an estuary that emerges at Cape Fear. The lower 50 mi (80 km) of the river is tidal.

== Watershed ==
Northeast Cape Fear River drains 1,714.70 square miles (4,441.1 km^{2}) of area, receives about 53.8 in/year of precipitation, and has a wetness index of 593.72 and is about 19% forested.

== Animals and plants ==
The river and its valley are home to a variety of interesting and uncommon flora and fauna, including the palmetto, cypress, alligator, pileated woodpecker, venus flytrap, and bowfin.

== Bridges ==
- Isabel Stellings Holmes Bridge (US 74/NC 133)
- Dan Cameron Bridge (I-140)
- Frank H. Kenan Bridge (I-40)
- Northeast Cape Fear Bridge (US 117/NC 133)

== See also ==
- Goshen Swamp
- List of North Carolina rivers
