= Casa Monica Hotel =

Historic hotel in St. Augustine, Florida, US

Coordinates: 29.89200°N 81.31363°W

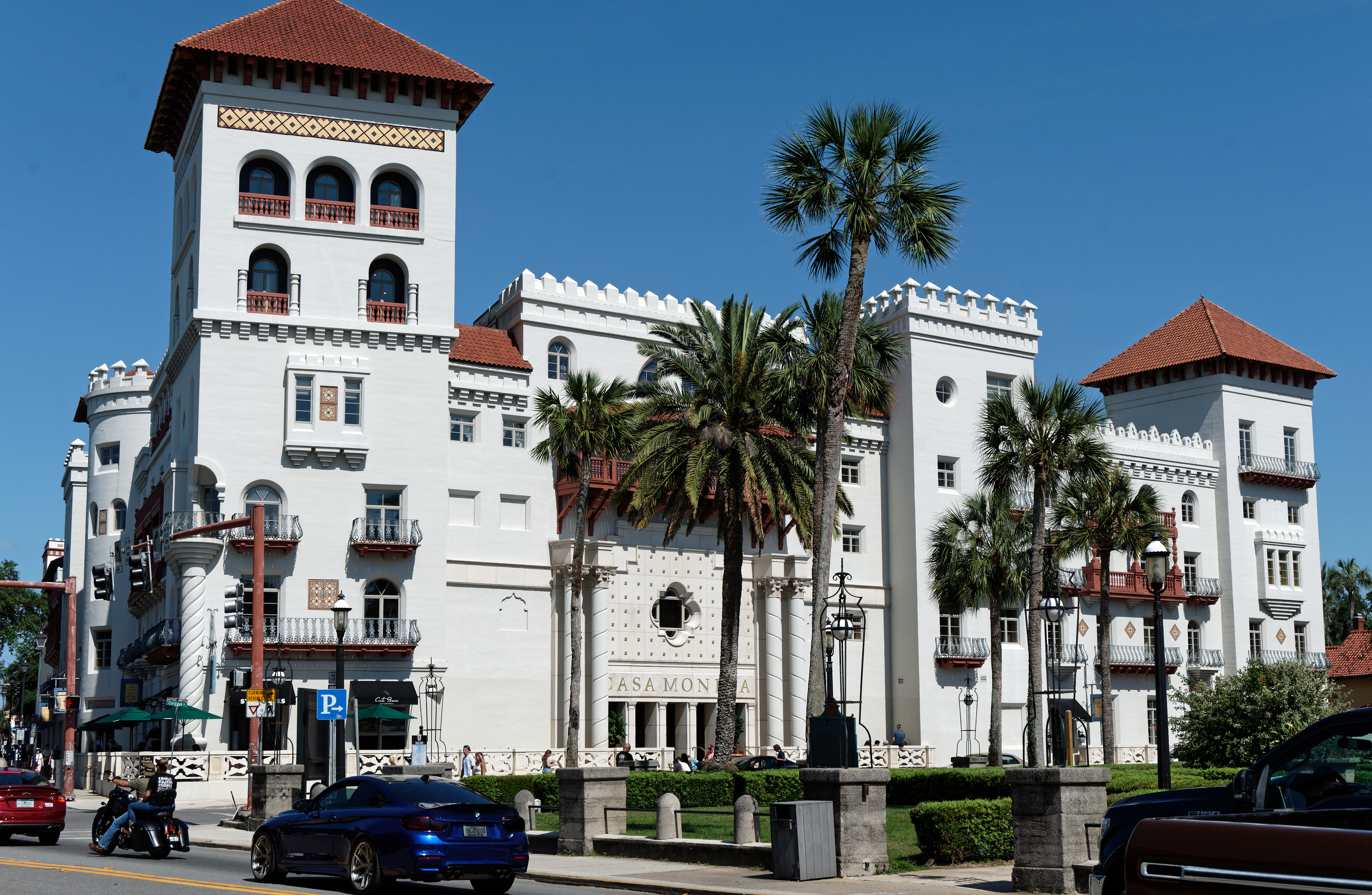
The Casa Monica Hotel in 2022

The Grand Bohemian Casa Monica is a historic hotel located in St. Augustine, Florida, in the United States. It is one of the oldest hotels in the United States and is a member of the Historic Hotels of America program of the National Trust for Historic Preservation.

== History ==
=== Early years ===
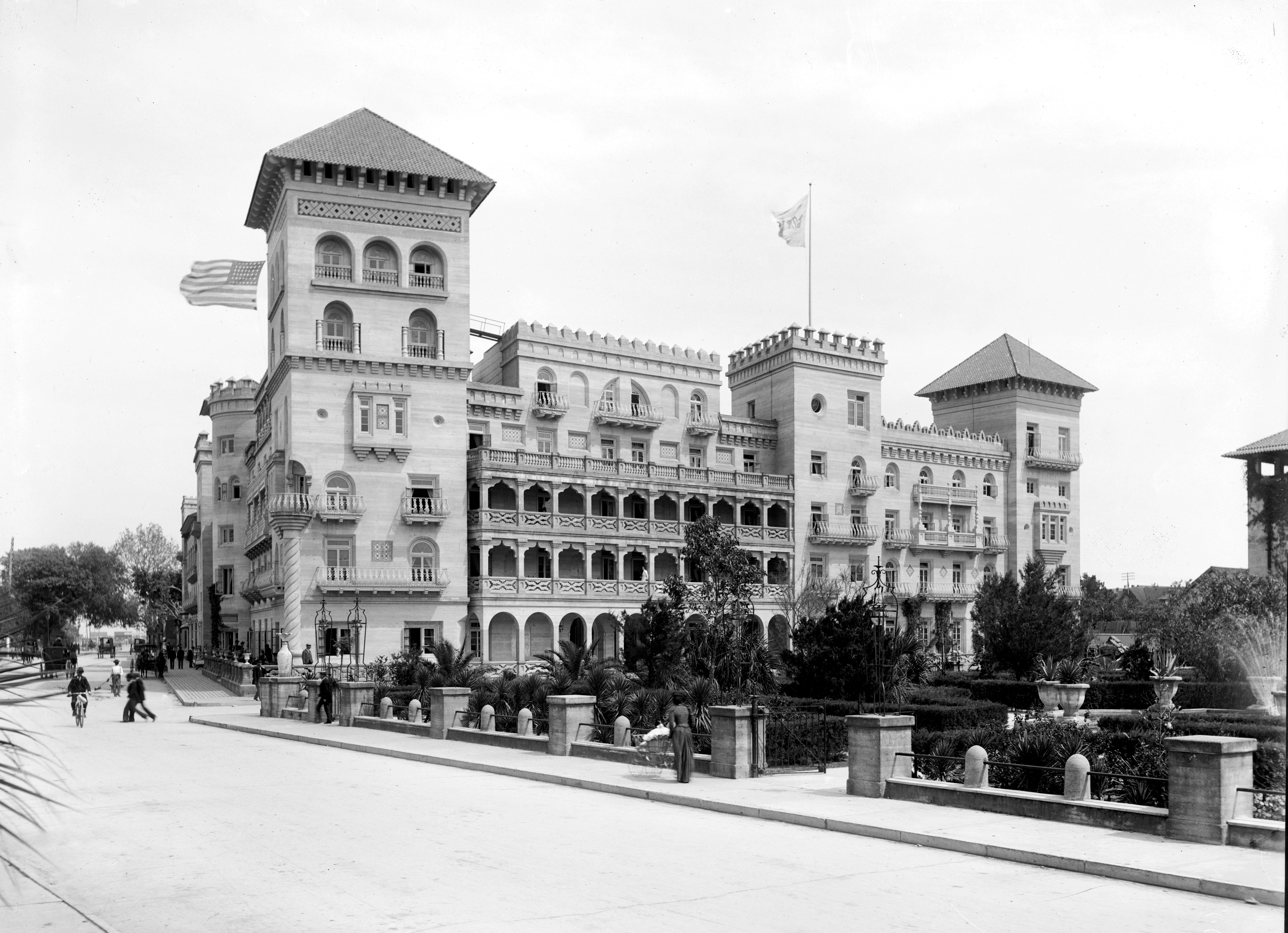
The Casa Monica Hotel, renamed the Cordova Hotel by Flagler in 1889, c. 1891

The Casa Monica Hotel was opened in 1888 by Franklin W. Smith, a notable Victorian architecture enthusiast and social reformer who earned a place in Florida history for interesting Henry Flagler in investing in the state. The hotel was named for Saint Monica, the North African mother of St. Augustine, Bishop of Hippo, for whom the city is named. The construction material was poured concrete, of which Franklin Smith was a leading experimenter. The original exterior finish was natural, leaving horizontal pour marks visible, and matching other grand Flagler era structures in downtown St. Augustine. The exterior was covered with stucco in the 1960s. The architectural style was a mix of Moorish Revival and Spanish Baroque Revival, which Smith was a pioneer promoter of. His winter home, Villa Zorayda, a block to the west, was the first Moorish Revival building in St. Augustine. The hotel's Sun Parlor was the most notable interior room, but it was gutted after the hotel closed.

Soon after completing the hotel, Smith ran into financial difficulties and sold the hotel, including all fixtures, furnishings, linen, and all other chattel, for $325,000 to oil and railroad tycoon Henry Flagler. Upon purchasing the hotel, Henry Flagler renamed the property the Cordova Hotel. Flagler founded the Standard Oil Company with John D. Rockefeller. Flagler already owned two hotels in St. Augustine, the Ponce de Leon Hotel (now Flagler College) and the Hotel Alcazar (now City Hall and the Lightner Museum). From 1888 to 1902, the hotel featured parties, balls, fairs and charity events.

The famous travel agency "Ask Mr. Foster" had its headquarters in the hotel. It was started by Ward G. Foster of St. Augustine, became a national business, and was owned for a time in the 20th century by Peter Ueberroth, one time Commissioner of Baseball. The building once featured an historic marker as the birthplace of the agency.

In 1902, a short bridge was constructed over Cordova Street, connecting the second floors of the Cordova Hotel and the Hotel Alcazar. The Cordova Hotel was turned into a wing of the other hotel, renamed the Alcazar Annex. In 1903, the Alcazar and Alcazar Annex were advertised as "enlarged and redecorated". In 1932, the conjoined parts of the hotel were closed due to the Great Depression. In 1945, the bridge between the Annex portion and the Alcazar Hotel was removed.

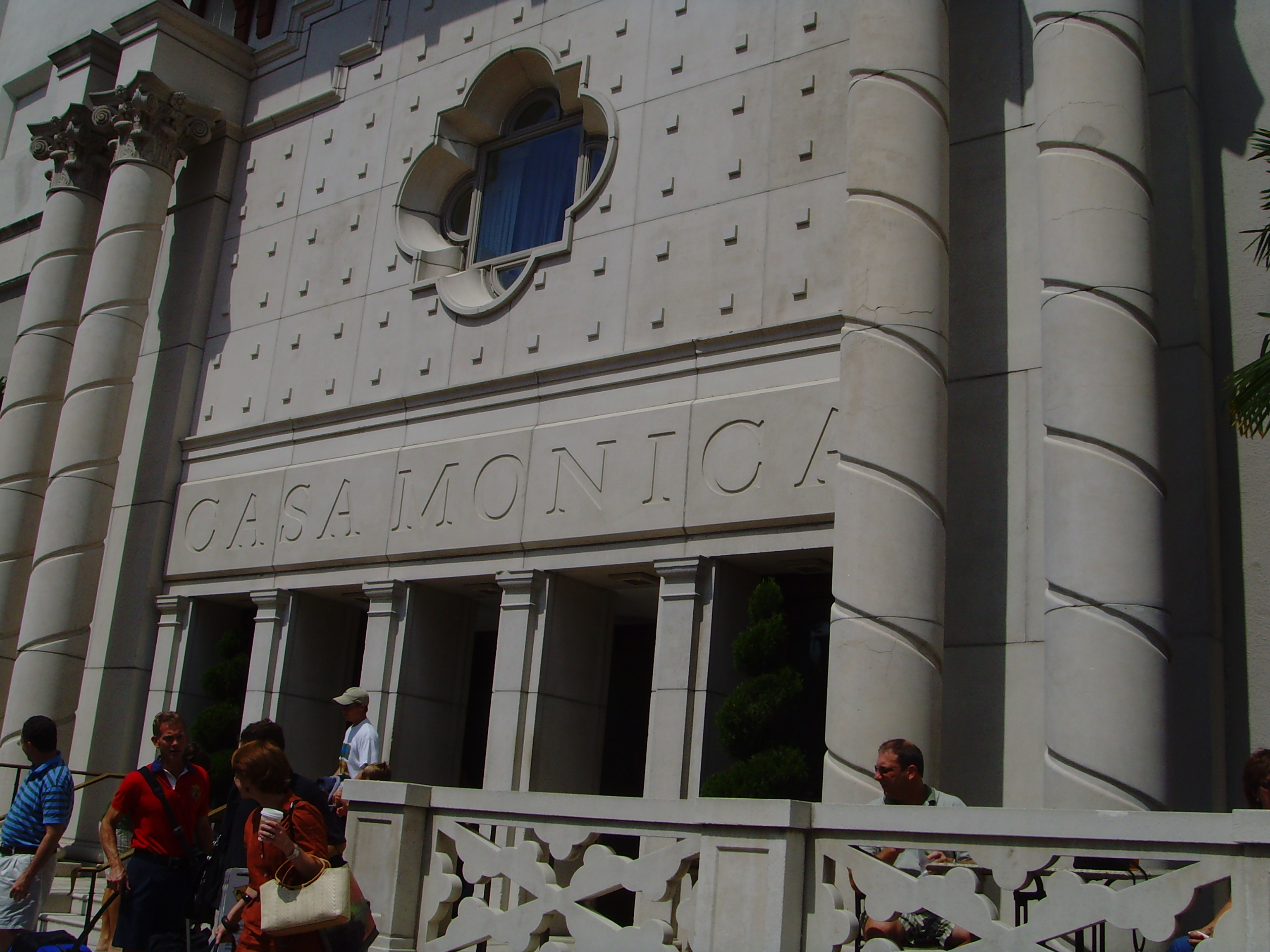
Entrance to the Casa Monica Hotel

=== Courthouse ===
In February 1962, St. Johns County Commission voted to purchase the former Casa Monica Hotel for $250,000 for use as the St. Johns County Courthouse. In 1964 the lobby of the then-vacant hotel was used to house police dogs that were used against civil rights demonstrators during the mass campaign led by Dr. Martin Luther King Jr. and Dr. Robert Hayling, see St. Augustine movement. The renovation took over six years to complete. It was finally dedicated as a courthouse in May 1968, and filled that role until the 1990s, housing government offices and archives as well as courtrooms. A notable feature of the courthouse were murals by the artist Hugo Ohlms, whose distinctive work was also featured in the nearby Catholic Cathedral and at the Ponce de Leon Motor Lodge (another civil rights landmark, where the arrest of Mrs. Peabody, the 72-year-old mother of the governor of Massachusetts, while trying to be served in a racially integrated group, made national headlines in 1964). The Ohlms murals were removed when the courthouse was returned to use as a hotel. Also removed were the stained glass scales of justice that had been in the quatrefoil window over the main door.

=== Renovation as a hotel ===
In February 1997, Richard Kessler, who had previously been involved with the Days Inn chain, was setting up his own Kessler Collection of lodgings. He purchased the building from St. Johns County for $1.2 million and began to remodel the building to once again become a hotel. The county Tax Collector's office and Property Appraiser's office were given until 1998 to relocate, so workers had to avoid a section of the building for several months. The renovation was completed in less than two years and the property opened in December 1999 under its original name as the Casa Monica Hotel. Richard Kessler and architect Howard Davis decided to keep the historic Moorish Revival style of the hotel. Tina Guarano Davis painted the Moorish-style woodwork in the hotel lobby. The Casa Monica sign on the Cordova Street side of the hotel covers over an earlier sign for the St. Johns County Courthouse. State historic preservation officials told them to preserve the courthouse sign, so they covered it rather than removing it. The huge flagpole on top of the hotel is actually a lightning rod.

=== Recent history ===
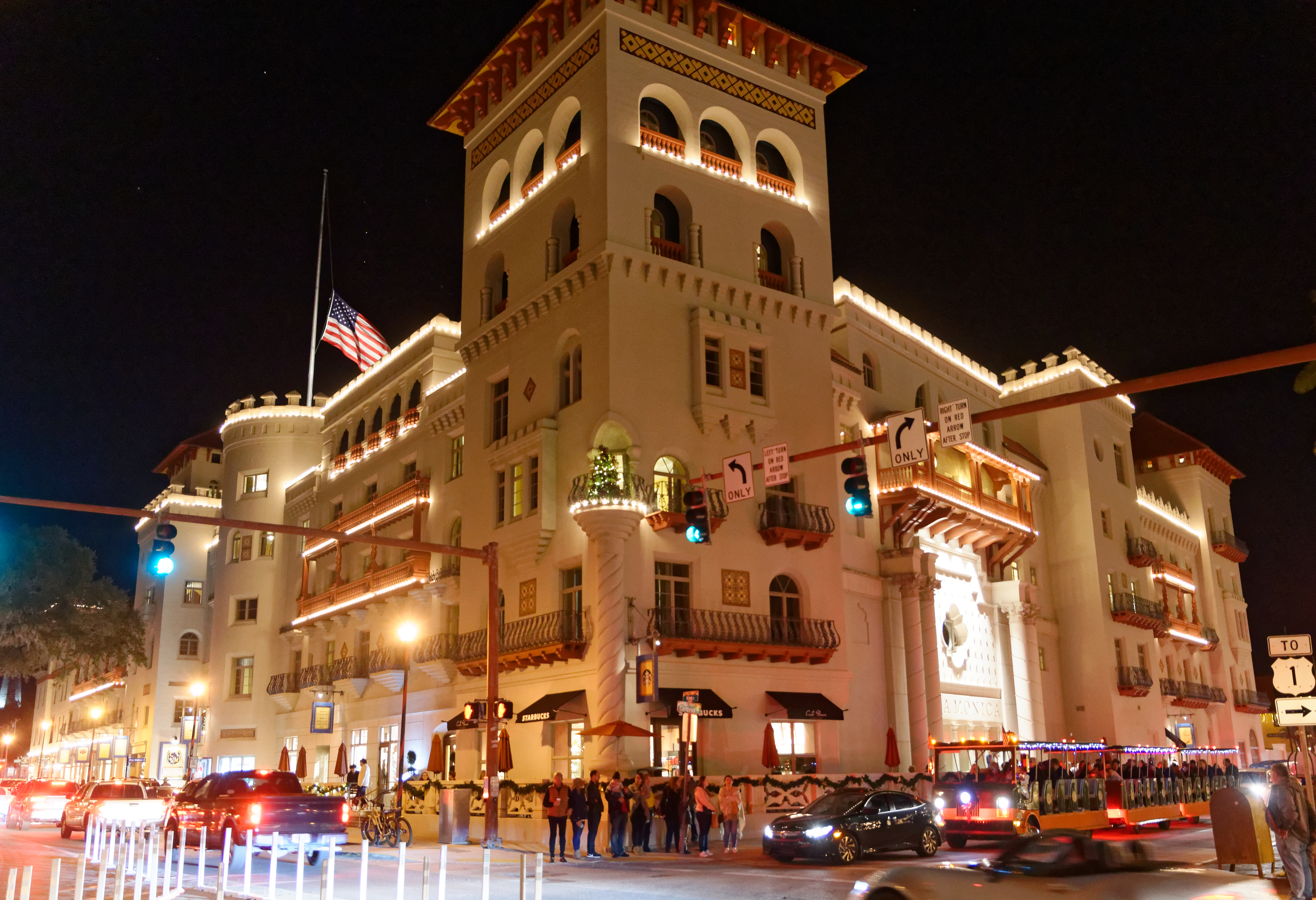
The hotel at night

Today, the Casa Monica Hotel operates as part of the Kessler Collection, headquartered in Orlando, Florida. In 2010, it became the first property to join the Autograph Collection, Marriott's brand of independent hotels and resorts. In November 2026, the hotel was renamed Grand Bohemian Casa Monica, St. Augustine.
