= Ponce de Leon Hotel =

Historic hotel in St. Augustine, Florida

- Ponce de León Hotel
- U.S. National Register of Historic Places
- U.S. National Historic Landmark
- U.S. National Historic Landmark District – Contributing property
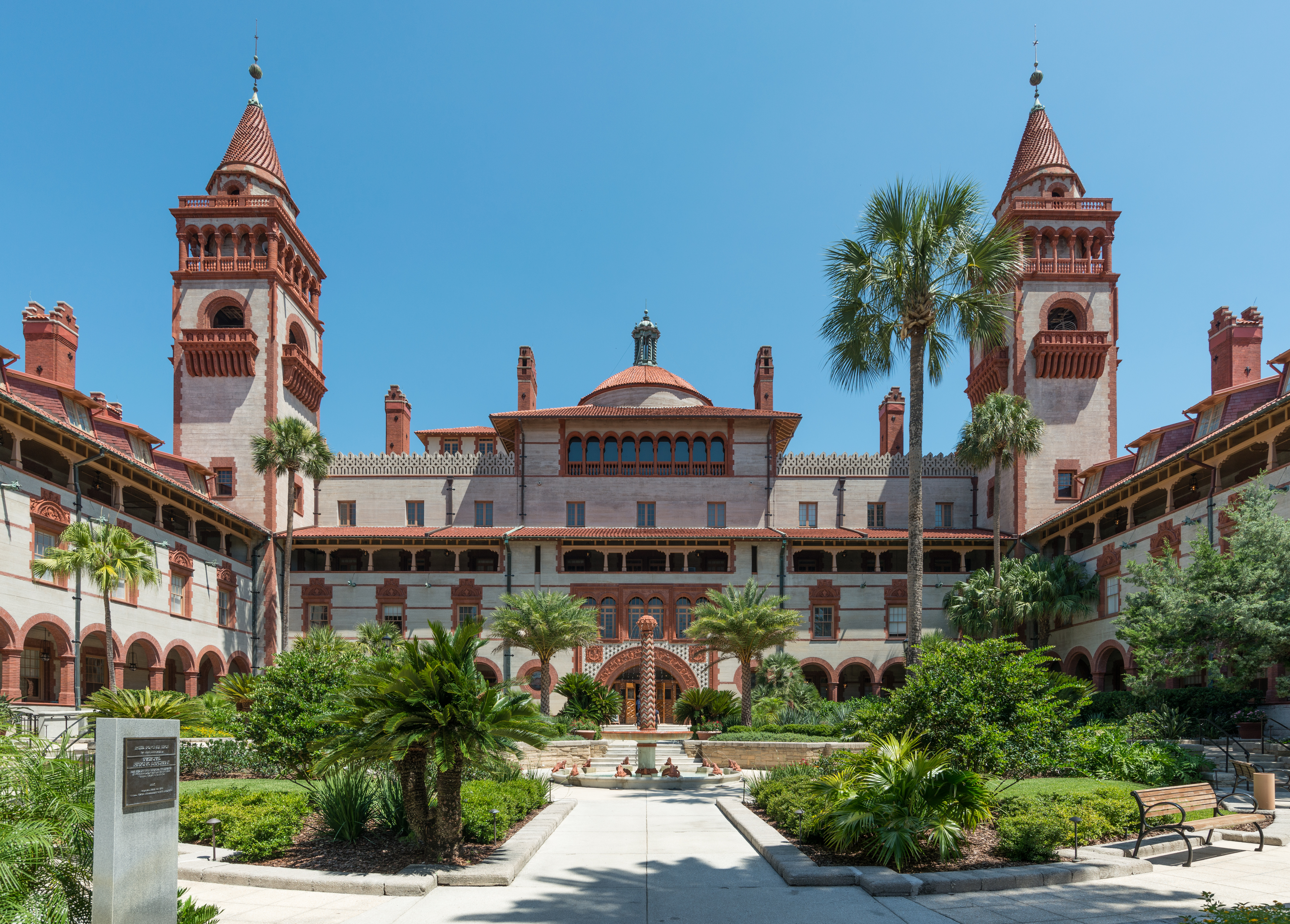
- The Ponce de León Hotel, today Flagler College

- Location within Florida Location within the United States
- Location: 74 King Street St. Augustine, Florida, US
- Coordinates: 29°53′32″N 81°18′54″W
- Built: 1885–1887
- Architect: John M. Carrere and Thomas Hastings
- Architectural style: Spanish Colonial Revival architecture
- Part of: St. Augustine Town Plan Historic District (ID70000847)
- NRHP reference No.: 75002067

Significant dates
- Added to NRHP: May 6, 1975
- Designated NHL: February 17, 2006
- Designated NHLDCP: April 15, 1970

The Hotel Ponce de Leon, also known as The Ponce, is a former luxury hotel in St. Augustine, Florida, built by millionaire developer and Standard Oil co-founder Henry M. Flagler. Built between 1885–1887, the winter resort opened in January 1888. The hotel was designed in the Spanish Colonial Revival style as the first major project of the New York architecture firm Carrère & Hastings, which gained world renown for more than 600 projects.

The hotel is the first of its kind constructed entirely of poured concrete, using the local coquina stone as aggregate. The hotel is one of the first buildings in the country wired for electricity from the onset, with the power being supplied by DC generators installed by Flagler's friend, Thomas Edison.

Since 1968, with the founding of Flagler College, the original building and grounds of the hotel have served as the centerpiece of the college campus.

== Background ==
Henry Flagler spent the winter of 1882–1883 in St. Augustine where he became interested in the historic city and its potential for a winter resort for wealthy northerners. He was particularly impressed with the poured concrete construction method of the Villa Zorayda, the recently constructed winter home of businessman Franklin Smith. Flagler offered to buy it for his wife, but Smith would not sell it to him.

Flagler returned to St. Augustine in 1885 and made Smith an offer. If Smith could raise $50,000, Flagler would invest $150,000 and they would build a hotel together. Smith couldn't come up with the funds, so Flagler began construction of the 540-room Ponce de León Hotel by himself, spending several times his original estimate. Smith helped train the masons on the mixing and pouring techniques he used on the Zorayda. Two years later, Smith would build the Casa Monica Hotel opposite the Ponce de Leon, on land sold to him by Flagler.

== Design and construction ==
The Hotel Ponce de Leon is built on land that was part of a former orange grove and salt marsh belonging to Dr. Andrew Anderson, owner of the nearby Markland house. Construction began in 1885 by contractors and former New England shipbuilders James McGuire and Joseph McDonald; the building was completed in 1887.

Various famed and notable designers, architects, and painters worked on the project. The hotel was designed by the New York architecture firm of John Carrère and Thomas Hastings, as their first major project. Soon after, they would design the New York Public Library in Manhattan. Interior design of the hotel was headed by Louis Comfort Tiffany, and his company, Tiffany & Co, which provided the stained glass windows in the hotel's dining room. The landscape was designed by Nathan Franklin Barrett. The hotel's furnishings were provided by Pottier & Stymus, a prominent New York City furniture and design firm at the time. Bernard Maybeck, whose later designs include the Palace of Fine Arts in San Francisco, served as a draftsman on the project and designed its 540 guest rooms. Architect Emmanuel Louis Masqueray, who had recently arrived from Paris and would go on to supervise the 1904 World's Fair in St. Louis, created the watercolor elevation of the hotel. Canvases depicting angels were painted by Virgilio Tojetti and stretched across the ceilings, while murals in the rotunda and dining room were completed by the well-known artist George W. Maynard, who a decade later painted a second set of the Exploration series murals in the Treasures Gallery at the Thomas Jefferson Building of the Library of Congress.

The murals at the Ponce were well known at the time. Writing of a visit to St Augustine, Ring Lardner has one of his characters say:

In the evenin' we strolled acrost the street to the Ponce—that's supposed to be even sweller yet than where we were stoppin' at. We walked all over the place without recognizin' nobody from our set. I finally warned the Missus that if we didn't duck back to our room I'd probably have a heart attack from excitement; but she'd read in her Florida guide that the decorations and pitchers was worth goin' miles to see, so we had to stand in front o' them for a couple hours and try to keep awake. Four or five o' them was thrillers, at that. Their names was Adventure, Discovery, Contest, and so on, but what they all should of [sic] been called was Lady Who Had Mislaid Her Clo'es.

The hotel's named after the fella that built it. He come from Spain and they say he was huntin' for some water that if he'd drunk it he'd feel young. I don't see myself how you could expect to feel young on water. But, anyway, he'd heard that this here kind o' water could be found in St. Augustine, and when he couldn't find it he went into the hotel business and got even with the United States by chargin' five dollars a day and up for a room.

— Gullible's Travels (1917)

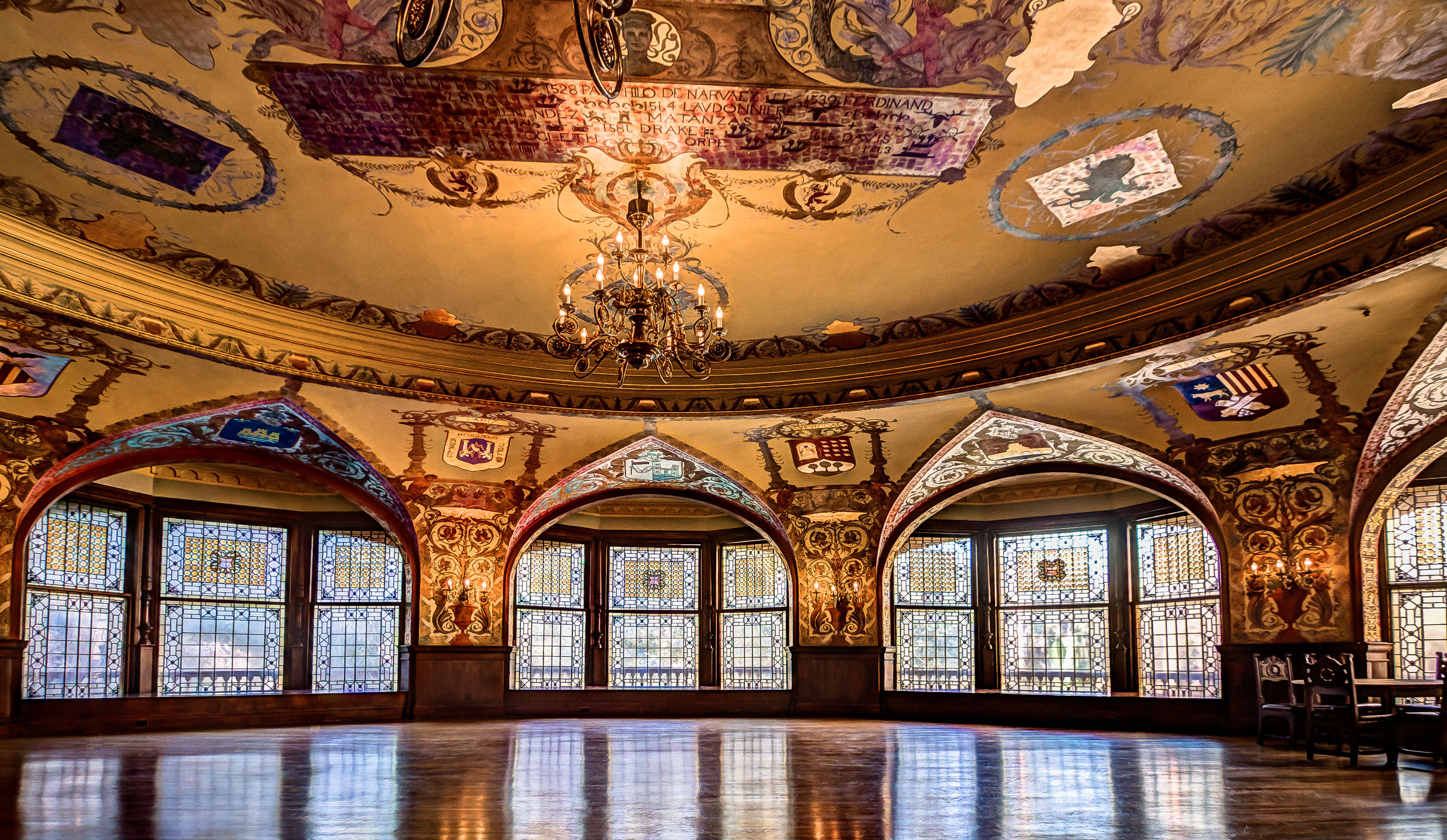
The Hotel Ponce de Leon dining room, with Tiffany stained glass windows

Electricity was supplied by the Edison Electric Company, as Thomas Edison was a personal friend of Henry Flagler and architect Thomas Hastings' brother Frank, who was the company's secretary-treasurer. Edison oversaw the installation of DC dynamos in the hotel. The building was one of the first in the world to be wired for electricity and constructed with it in mind. When the hotel first opened, Flagler hired staff to turn power on and off for his residents, because the people staying at the hotel were too afraid to turn the switches on and off themselves.

Originally, the twin towers of the hotel were water storage tanks which contained 8,000 gallons each, providing running water for hotel guests. During World War II, a small room to the east of the central dome served as a brig when the hotel served as the founding headquarters of the Coast Guard Reserve U.S. Coast Guard.

== Operation ==
The Hotel Ponce de Leon opened on January 10, 1888. It was an instant success, and within two years, Flagler opened another hotel in St. Augustine, the Alcazar. Just across the street, it absorbed guests that the Ponce could not accommodate and eased the massive demand. A year later, in 1888, he purchased friend and colleague Franklin Smith's Casa Monica Hotel, renovating it and reopening it as the Cordova. The projects were Flagler's first three projects as a partner in PICO, the Plant Investment Company. In 1882, Henry Plant, Flagler and nine other northern businessmen established the corporation to develop the Southernmost Frontier of the US – the Florida peninsula from Orlando south.

With the success of the Ponce de Leon, Flagler realized the need for a sound transportation system to support his resorts, and he purchased short-line railroads to form what would later become known as the Florida East Coast Railway. He modernized the existing railroads for them to accommodate heavier loads and more traffic, allowing guests to reach the hotel from New York City and other northern cities. Over the next two decades, Flagler expanded the system further south, until it reached Key West. The Overseas Extension is known as the Eighth Wonder of the Modern World.

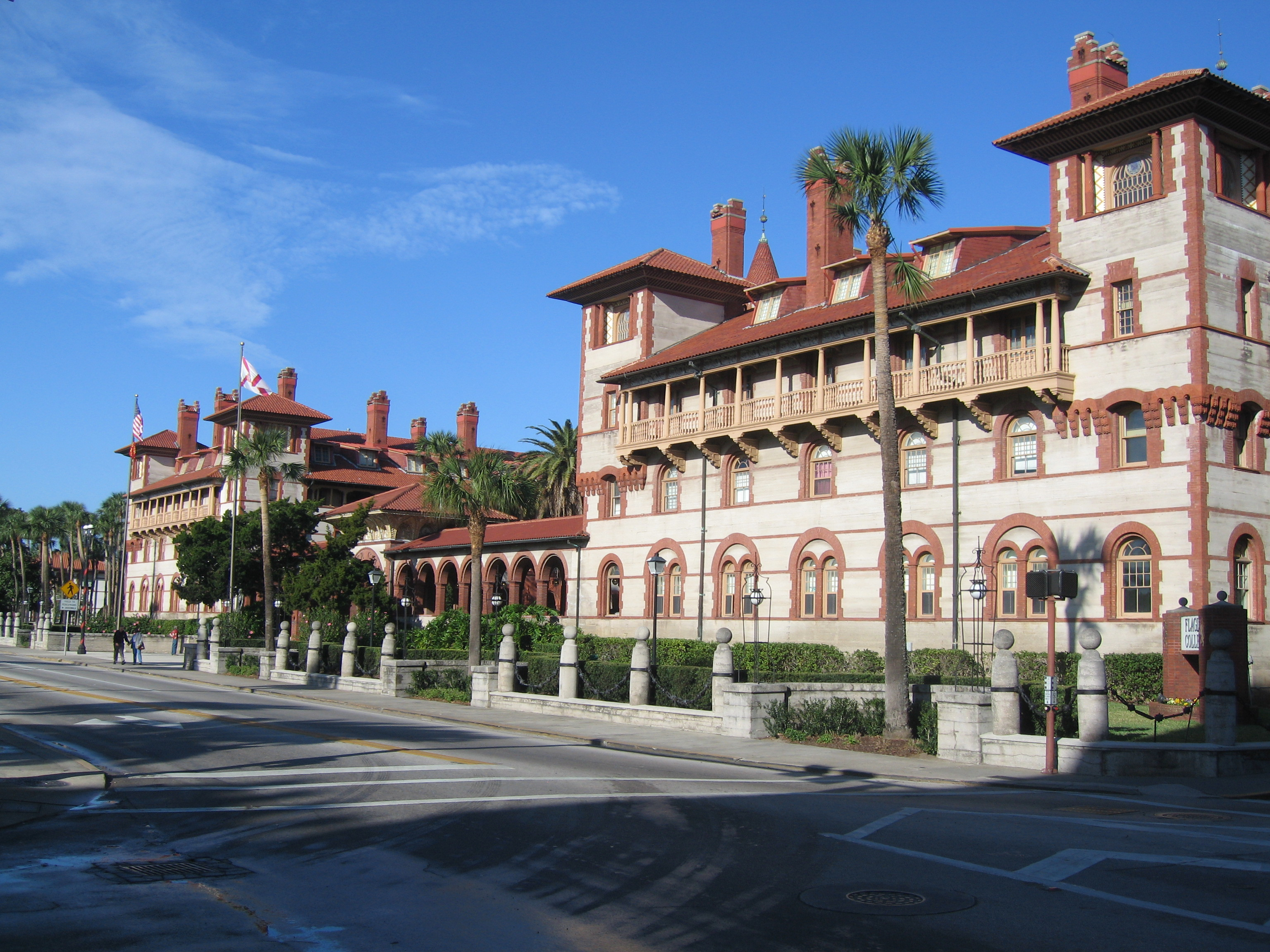
The front facade of the hotel, facing King Street in downtown St. Augustine.

Noted personalities that stayed at the hotel during its operation included President Grover Cleveland, Mark Twain, future President Franklin D. Roosevelt, as a college student on spring break, President Theodore Roosevelt, President Warren G. Harding, future President John F. Kennedy at age 13 with his family, Vice President Lyndon B. Johnson, Somerset Maugham, Babe Ruth and Babe Didrikson.

The headwaiter of the Ponce in the 1880s and 1890s was Frank Thompson, who was a pioneer civil rights advocate and an organizer of the professional black baseball team that became the Cuban Giants. One member of the team, Frank Grant, was elected to the Baseball Hall of Fame.

The hotel saw declining visitor numbers throughout the 1910s and 1920s. A major cause of this was the continuous extension of Flagler's railway, which allowed tourists to vacation in the warmer, tropical climates further south, giving rise to cities like West Palm Beach and Miami. However, even as the Alcazar and Cordova Hotels closed, the Ponce remained open and was one of three Flagler hotels in the state to survive the Great Depression and operate into the mid-20th Century.

== Art colony ==
Flagler established an artist colony at the hotel, with an Artists' Studios building constructed to the rear of the resort. The colony attracted many up-and-coming American artists of the time, including Martin Johnson Heade, who painted, among other works, "Giant Magnolias on a Blue Cloth" in Studio No. 7. The painting now hangs in the National Gallery of Art in Washington, D.C., and Heade has been honored on a U.S. postage stamp. Other works of his are in the White House and various significant galleries.

Other artists of the colony included Felix de Crano, Reynolds Beal, Arthur Vidal Diehl, the flower painter Albert Fuller Graves, the Provincetown artist and teacher Charles Webster Hawthorne, the impressionist painter Harry L. Hoffman, and Heinrich Pfeiffer.

During the Great Depression, the federal government had organized several of its direct aid programs in the city with the goal of revitalizing the area's tourism economy. Authors such as Ernest Hemingway, Zora Neale Hurston, Robert Frost, John Dos Passos, and, most particularly, Marjorie Kinnan Rawlings, visited or lived in St. Augustine during this time, and there was an active community of artists.

== Coast Guard Reserve training center ==
During World War II, the Ponce de Leon Hotel was taken over by the federal government and was used as a Coast Guard Training Center. St. Augustine is considered to be the birthplace of the Coast Guard Reserve, as one of the first classes to graduate from Reserve officer training did so at St. Augustine in May 1941. From 1942 until the end of the war in 1945, thousands of young recruits received their basic and advanced training at the hotel, with up to 2,500 trainees living in the building at any one time.

One of the Coast Guardsmen the trained at the hotel was Jacob Lawrence, already a famous artist. According to the official Coast Guard history,

In October 1943 Lawrence was drafted into the Coast Guard, then part of the Navy. As the armed services were still segregated, he, along with all African-American recruits, were automatically limited to the steward's mate rate. After his basic training at Curtis Bay, Maryland he was assigned to the Ponce de Leon Hotel (commandeered by the Coast Guard) in St. Augustine. Despite his rate, Lawrence was urged to continue his artistic endeavors by his commanding officer, Captain J.S. Rosenthal. He was later transferred to USCGC Sea Cloud [1944], the first integrated ship in the naval services.

He became the first African-American artist to have his work hung in both the Vatican and the White House.

== Post-war return to hotel ==
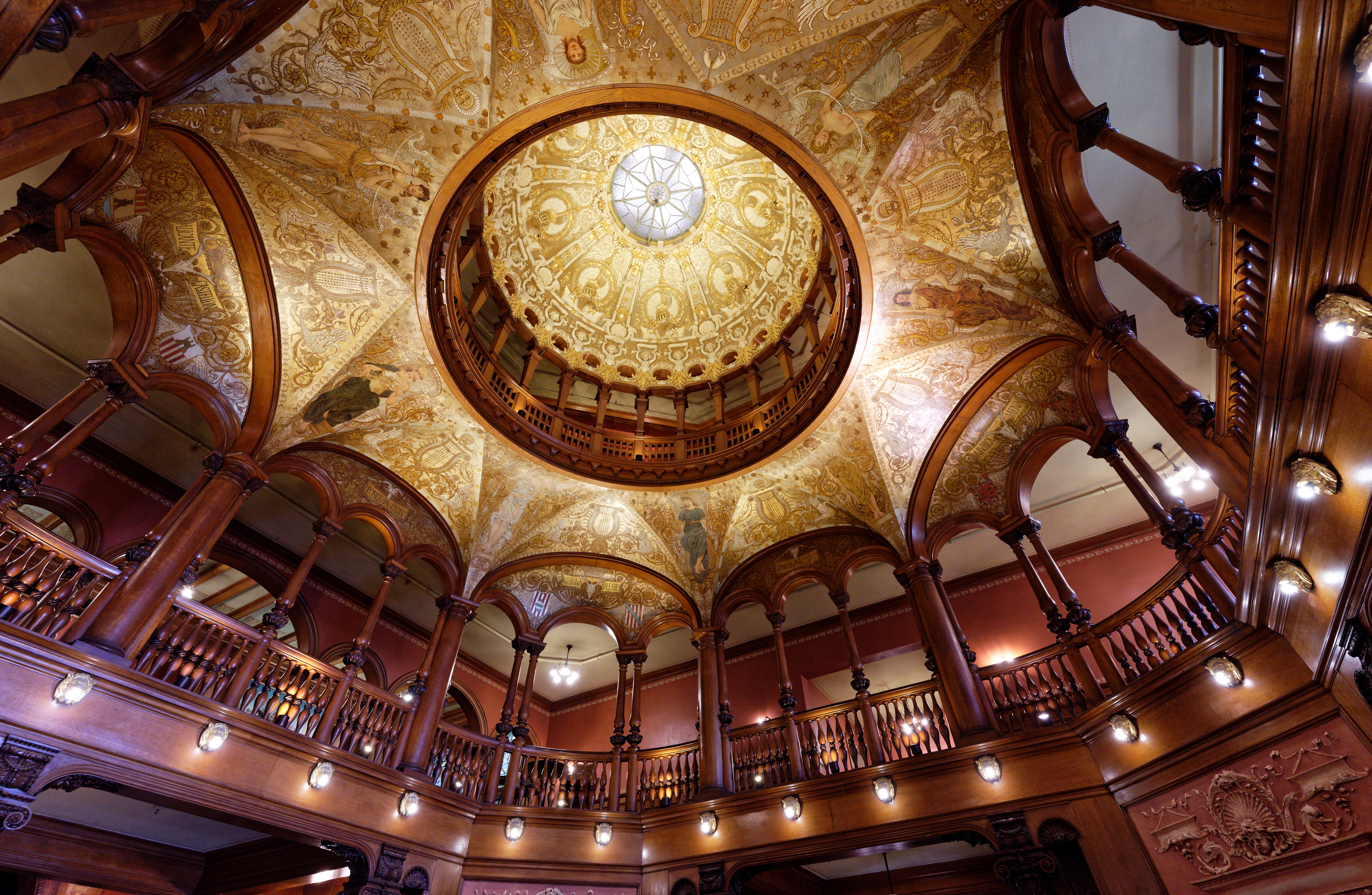
An interior view of the hotel's rotunda and ceiling mural.

After the war ended, the building was deactivated by the Coast Guard and returned to operation as a hotel. Large crowds that had stayed away from the city during the war returned, but the boom did not last.

The hotel saw declining visitor numbers in the following years, and in 1967 it was permanently closed.

== Flagler College ==
In 1968 the hotel became the centerpiece of the newly-established Flagler College. Beginning in 1976, with the nation's bicentennial anniversary, Flagler College embarked on an ambitious campaign to restore the hotel and other Flagler-era campus buildings to their original grandeur. In 1988 the College celebrated the centennial of the Ponce de Leon Hotel, and a decade later students created the Flagler's Legacy program, which provides guided historic tours of the former hotel to thousands of visitors annually.

The building was added to the US National Register of Historic Places in 1975, and became a U.S. National Historic Landmark on February 21, 2006.

== In popular culture ==
- The 1920 silent film Stolen Moments, starring Rudolph Valentino, was partially filmed and set in the Ponce de Leon Hotel and its courtyard.
- Route 66, Season four, Episode 19, titled "This Is Going to Hurt Me More Than It Hurts You", was filmed at the hotel.

== Gallery ==
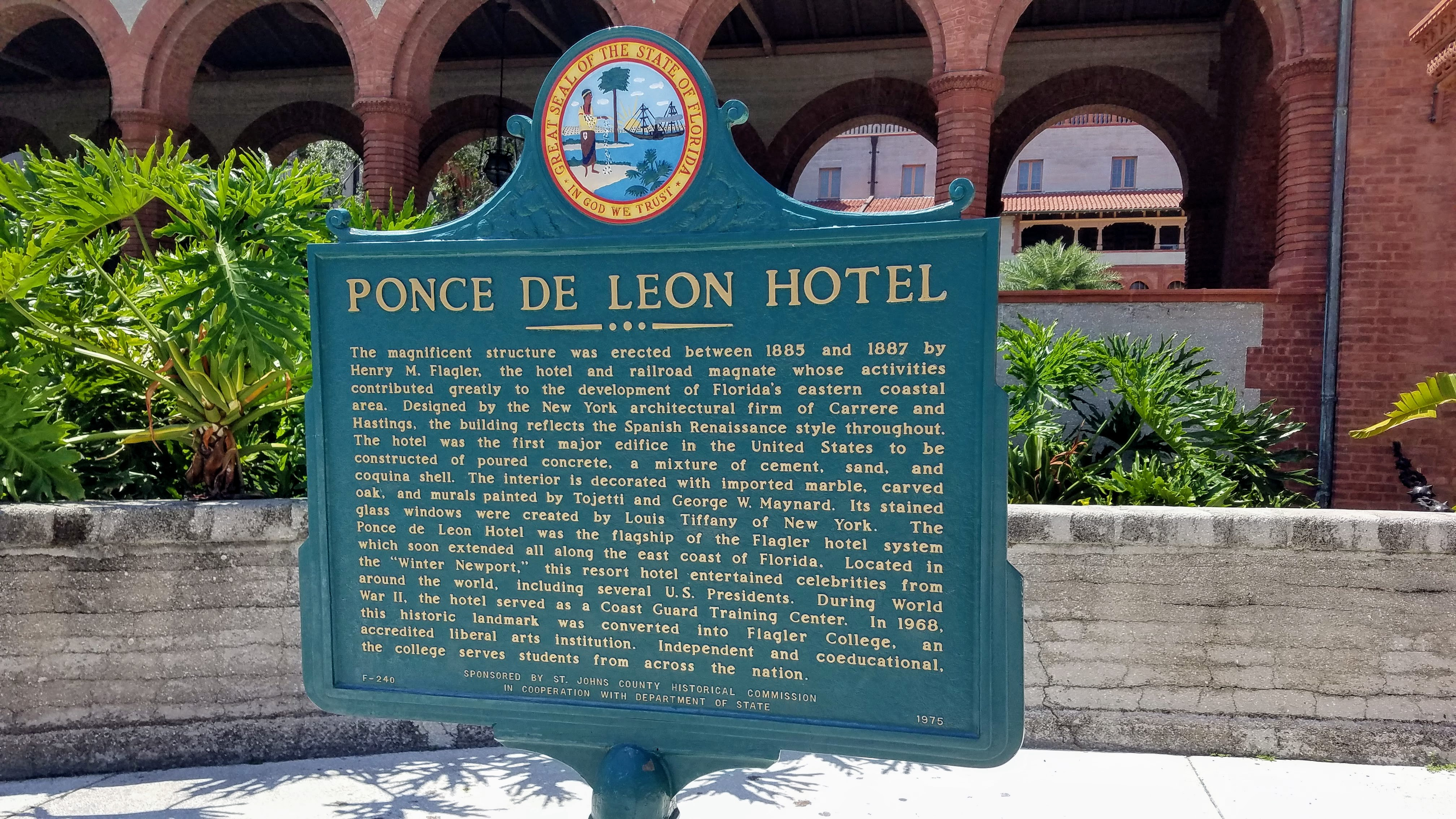
Ponce de Leon Hotel Historic Marker

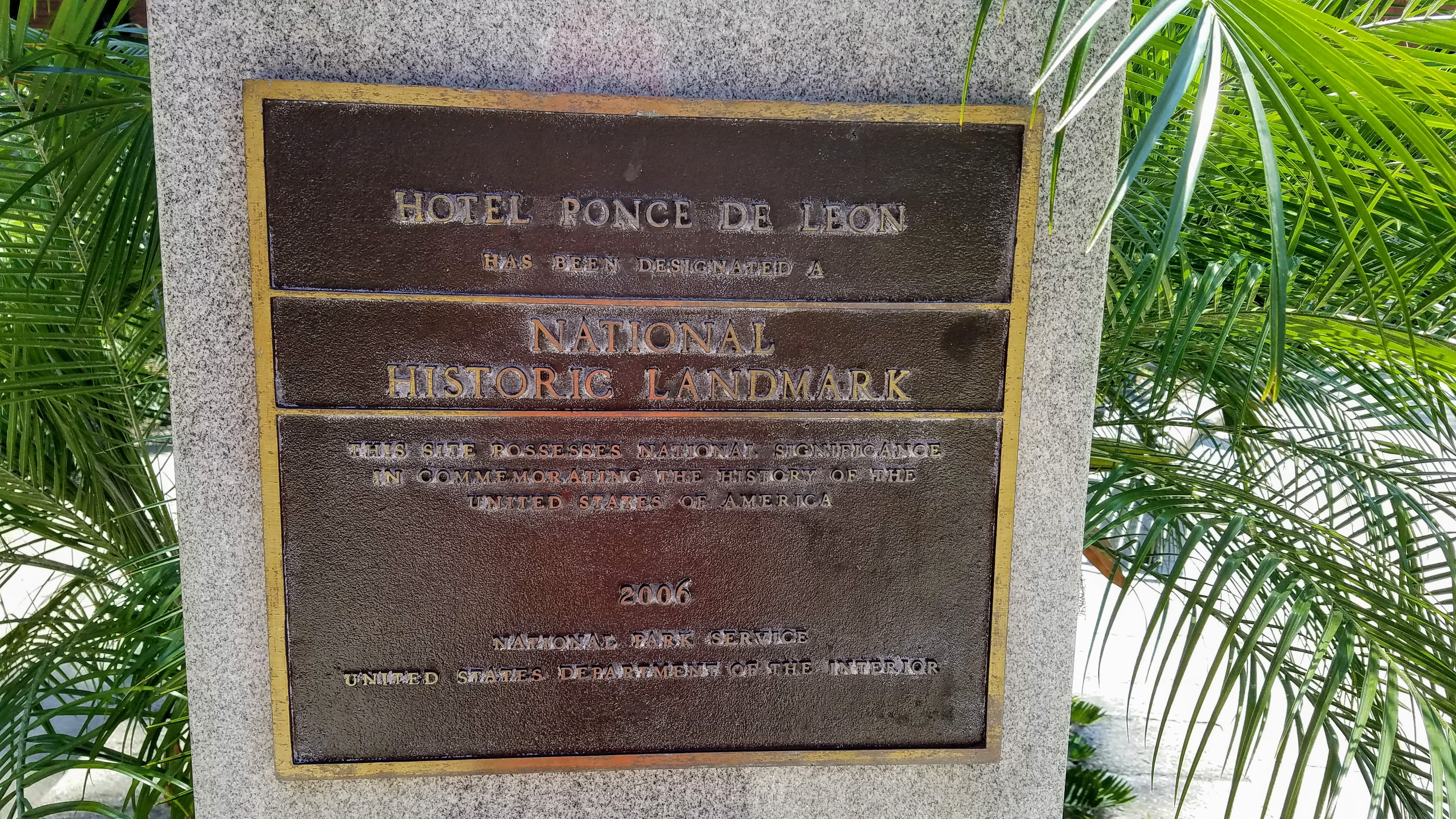
Ponce de Leon Hotel National Historic Landmark

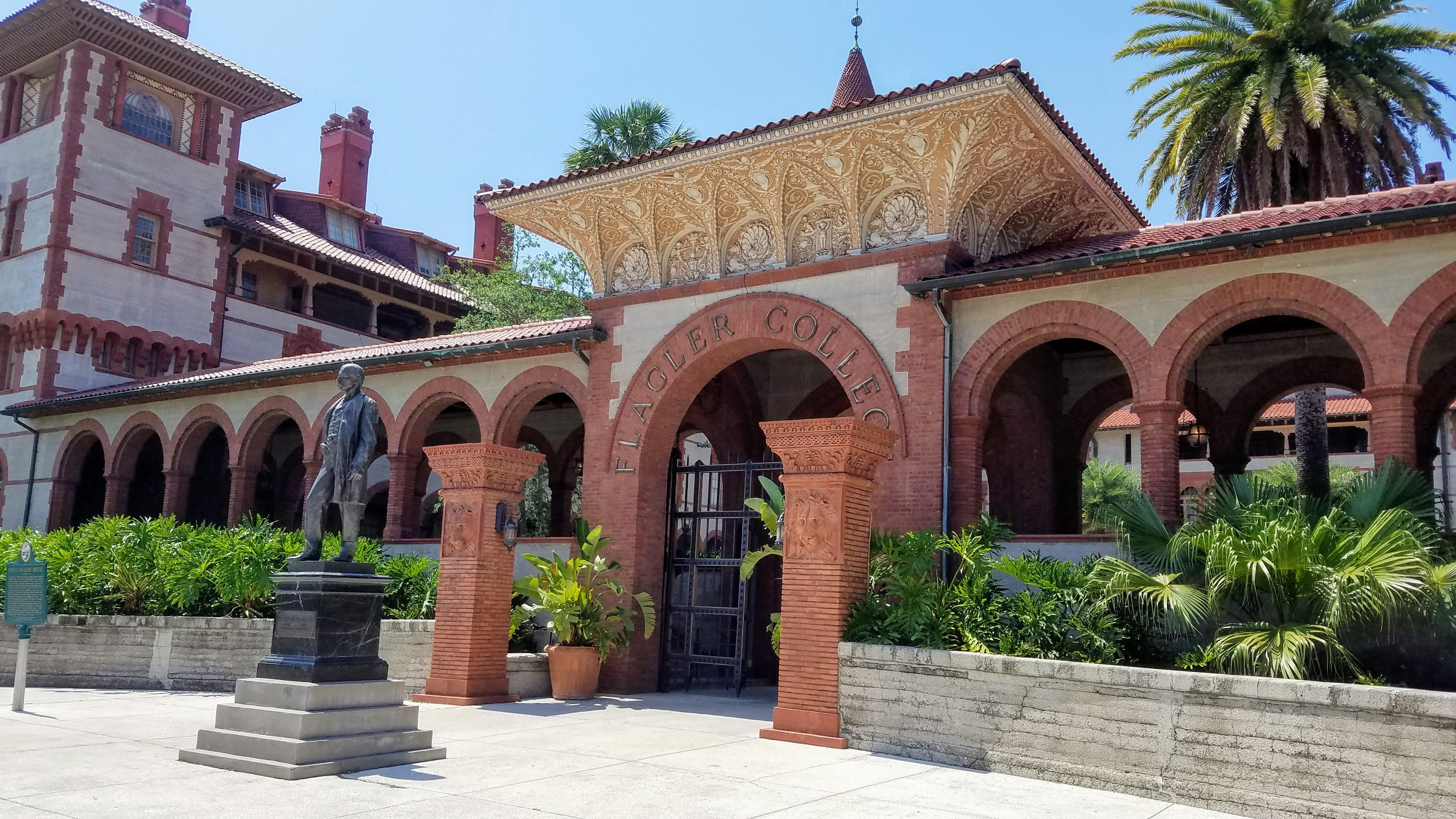
Entrance - May 2019

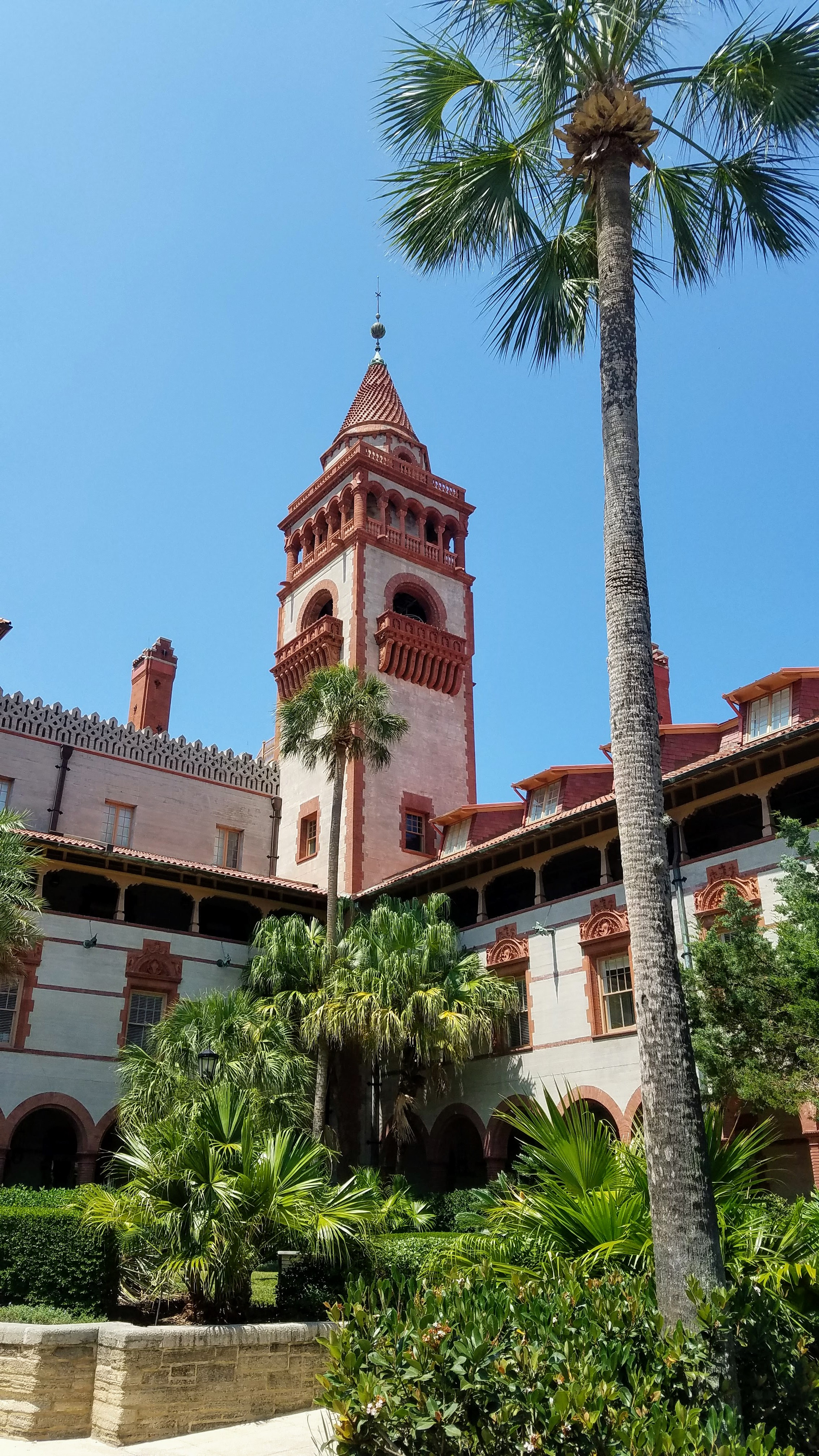
May 2019

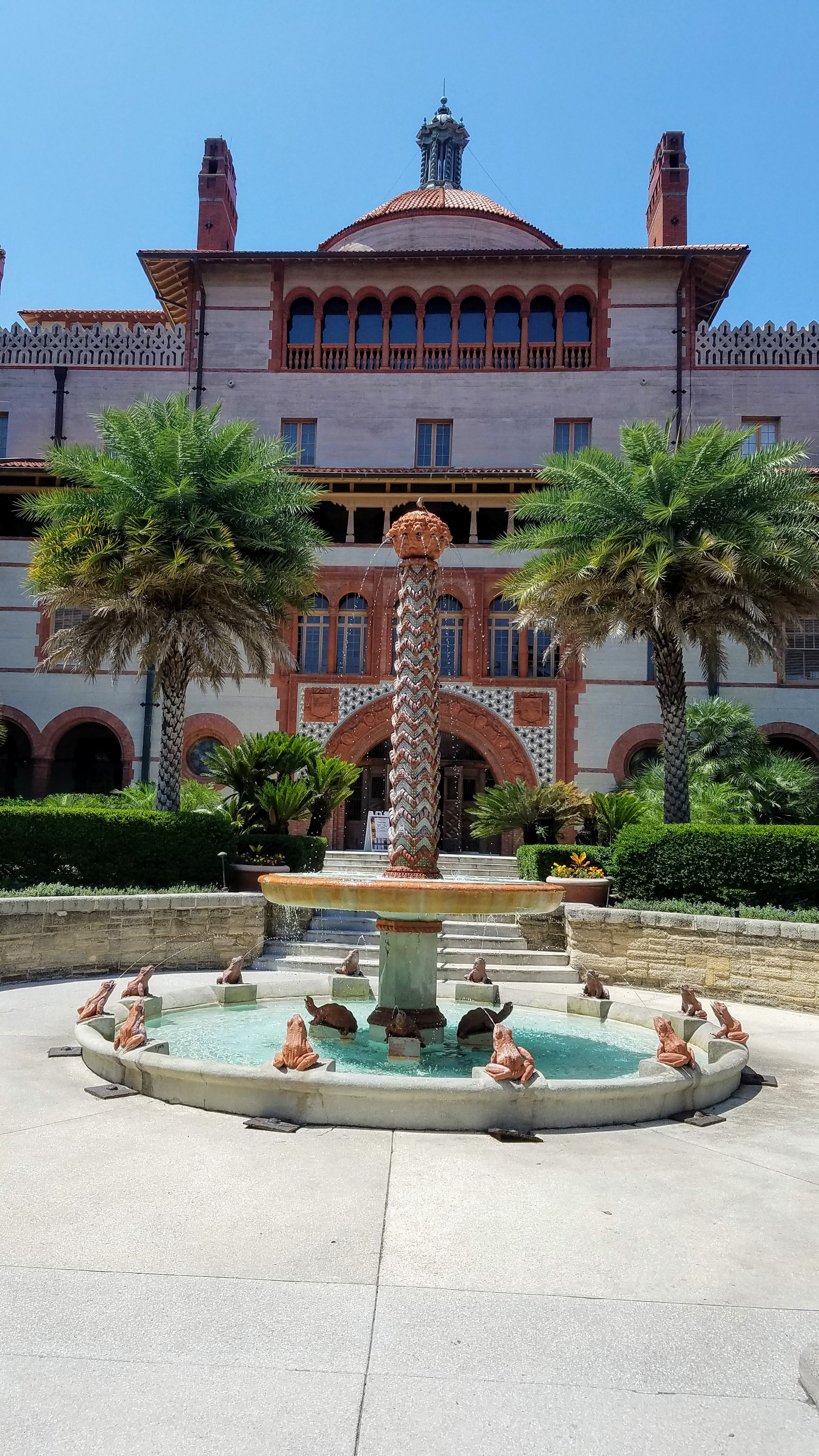
May 2019

== Bibliography ==
- Graham, Thomas (2004). Flagler's St. Augustine Hotels. Pineapple Press.
- Akin, Edward (1988). Flagler. Kent State University Press.
- Ossman, Laurie; Ewing, Heather (2011). Carrère and Hastings, The Masterworks. Rizzoli USA. ISBN 9780847835645.
- Keys, Leslee F. (2015). Hotel Ponce de Leon: The Rise, Fall, & Rebirth of Flagler's Gilded Age Palace. University Press of Florida.
- Branch, Taylor (1998). Pillar of Fire: America in the King Years 1963–65. Simon & Schuster.
- Colburn, David (1985). Racial Change and Community Crisis: St. Augustine, Florida, 1877–1980. Columbia University Press.
