= Franklin W. Smith =

American businessman (1826–1911)

Franklin Smith
- Born: October 9, 1826; Boston, Massachusetts, US
- Died: October 11, 1911 (aged 85); Cambridge, Massachusetts, US
- Occupation: Hardware Merchant
- Political party: Republican
- Spouse: Laura A. Smith
- Children: 2

Franklin Webster Smith (1826–1911) was an American idealistic reformer who made his fortune as a Boston hardware merchant. He was an early abolitionist, defendant in a civilian court-martial in 1864, author, and architectural enthusiast who proposed transforming Washington, D.C., into a "capital of beauty and cultural knowledge".

== Early life ==
Franklin Smith was born into a prominent Beacon Hill family in Boston, Massachusetts on October 9, 1826. His father, Benjamin, was the Tax Collector for the Port of Boston, and his great-grandfather, Urian Oakes, was president of Harvard University.

Benjamin and Mary Oakes Smith were his mother and father, and he was the younger brother of Mary O. (Loud) and Benjamin G. Smith, who became his partner in Smith Brothers & Company, a hardware business in Boston.

Smith was a moral and religious man and served as Sunday-school superintendent at his Baptist church, Tremont Temple, which he also helped renovate after a fire.

=== YMCA ===
When Smith was young, his family's wealth permitted him to travel abroad. At age 25, he attended The Great Exhibition in London, where he marveled at the examples of architecture and culture from around the world. Upon his return home, he was asked to raise funds for a new organization, the Young Men's Christian Association. With the memory of his trip still fresh, he planned a world bazaar, which was staged at the Tremont Temple. Facades of famous buildings around the world were constructed and staffed by well-known local residents who dressed in authentic costumes and sold items imported for the event. The function was spectacularly successful, and the YMCA of Boston was the first chapter of the organization in the United States. Smith was elected their first president in 1855.

== Politics and family ==
Smith joined other abolitionists including Anson Burlingame to organize the Republican Party in Massachusetts. He supported the 1860 election of Abraham Lincoln, and attended the inauguration on March 4, 1861, with his wife on their honeymoon. Laura Bevan had been born in Baltimore, Maryland and was several years younger than he. They had three children who lived to adulthood: George Stuart, born in 1863; Lillian, born in 1865; and Nina, born in 1877.

== U.S. Navy vs Franklin W. Smith ==
=== Reformer ===
Smith Brothers did considerable trade with the military. Whenever Franklin observed dishonesty, he felt compelled to report it to authorities, then wrote an account of each offense, had it printed, and distributed the pamphlets throughout the city. He wrote to the chairman of the House Naval Affairs Committee in 1863 and testified before a Senate committee, resulting in the passage of a law simplifying honest bidding and making manipulation difficult. Smith identified the names of clerks who accepted bribes and created an Analysis of Certain Contracts for the United States Secretary of the Navy. The report showed how specific contractors were able to consistently bid low.

        Retail   Honest   Other
        price    bidder   bidder
item A    100      110      75    The other bidder learns that very few or none of item A
item B     50       60      90    will be purchased, so he prices that article artificially 
          ===      ===     ===    low and can price item B ridiculously high as long as  
total     160      170     165    his total bid is below that of the honest bidder.

The naval bureau chiefs were angered that a civilian contractor questioned their integrity and embarrassed them by appearing before Congress and documenting the charges. Instead of eliminating the dishonesty in their subordinates, they targeted the Smith Brothers. Every transaction with the company was examined, and justification was demanded for every error or imperfect item supplied by the company. Despite the scrutiny, Smith was always able to provide a convincing explanation.

=== Senate committee ===
In January 1864, a Senate committee chaired by John Parker Hale formed to investigate naval contract fraud. The Navy brass despised Hale since he helped convince Congress to ban flogging in 1850 and grog rations in 1862. Hearings lasted almost four months, with the Smith brothers providing key testimony. The committee's report was not released until June 29, but it was obvious from testimony that it would confirm Smith's accusations and dismiss the Navy's allegations against the Smith brothers.

=== Arrest ===
On June 17, 1864, two weeks after the conclusion of the Hale hearings and two weeks before the report was to be made public, both the Smith brothers were arrested. The timing was not an accident; having the principal witnesses in jail would tend to discredit the Senate report when it was released. Early in the morning, a detail of marines grabbed Franklin and dragged him to a waiting boat, where he was transported across the harbor to Georges Island and Fort Warren. They had no warrant, only a telegraphed order from Gideon Welles, Secretary of the Navy. The marines broke down the door of Smith Brothers & Company, seizing records and correspondence, then did the same at his residence. Company clerks were arrested when they arrived for work the next morning; they were questioned and released. The business was forced to close because the company's books and papers had been taken. When family members went to post bail, they were told that bail had not been set. Next, no one claimed authority to accept bail for a military charge. When bail was finally set, it was an unbelievable half a million dollars. However, Smith was so highly regarded by his fellow businessmen that nearly $1 million was pledged in less than two days. Even then, Smith was denied counsel and visitors. The Massachusetts Congressional delegation, including Charles Sumner, Henry Wilson, Henry L. Dawes, George S. Boutwell, William B. Washburn, Thomas D. Eliot, John Denison Baldwin and John B. Alley went to the office of Navy Secretary Welles and offered to guarantee Smith's court appearance personally, but to no avail. Smith was finally released on July 1, two weeks after his arrest and two days after the Hale report was submitted to Congress. At the time, he still had not been charged with a specific crime, just "fraud upon the United States" and "wilful neglect of duty as a contractor" with the Navy. However, his bond was lowered to $20,000.

=== Court martial ===
Smith expected to be tried in United States federal courts. Instead, he was ordered to report to a military general court-martial in Philadelphia, 266 miles (428 km) distant.

During the Civil War, such a surprising number of dishonest contractors had taken advantage of the Army and Navy's need for war material that a legal provision was enacted by Congress on July 17, 1862, which stated that any civilian who supplied material under contract to the military became a member of the military and was subject to court-martial.

Once again, the Massachusetts Congressional delegation talked to Welles, but got nowhere. They appealed to President Abraham Lincoln, who read a tribute to Smith's reputation that Senator Sumner had written and the other congressmen had endorsed, then scanned the testimonial to Smith's business integrity, signed by ninety prominent Boston merchants. Lincoln offered to have the case dismissed. Senator Sumner replied,

Mr. President, we trust you will do nothing of the sort. To do that would leave a stigma on a good man's name. Smith Brothers want it never to be said that this charge was fixed up through influence. They challenge the fight but want protection against a conspiracy and a court chosen by their enemies. We only come to ask you that when the court convicts, as it is evident it means to do, you will personally review the case.

Lincoln agreed and pledged, "If I find that men have been pursuing the Smiths, I will lay my long hand upon them, no matter who they are." He then ordered that the court-martial be conducted in Boston and asked Navy Secretary Welles to send him the trial record at the conclusion for his review. Welles was told to delay execution of the sentence until the president gave his approval.

=== Trial ===
The trial began September 15, 1864 and lasted four months, with the Navy questioning fewer than a dozen transactions among 12,554 items totalling $1.2 million in government purchases from the Smith Brothers. Only one article—a delivery of Revely Tin metal was supplied instead of the Banca variety—shorted the Navy, by $100–200. Predictably, the trial ended in judgment against the defendants, who were sentenced to two years in prison and fined $25,000. The judgment and sentence were approved by the Secretary of the Navy; all that remained was a presidential sanction.

=== Presidential action ===
Charles Sumner again met with President Lincoln on the Smiths' behalf. The president asked Sumner to review the lengthy report from the Navy Secretary which identified the key elements in the court-martial, then render an opinion. Senator Sumner studied the document overnight and wrote an opinion which summarized the treatment of Franklin Smith:

It is hard that citizens enjoying a good name, who had the misfortune to come into business relations with the Government, should be exposed to such a spirit; that they should be dragged from their homes, and hurried to a military prison; that, though civilians, they should be treated as military offenders; that they should be compelled to undergo a protracted trial by courtmartial, damaging their good name, destroying their peace, breaking up their business, and subjecting them to untold expense—when, at the slightest touch, the whole case vanishes into thin air, leaving behind nothing but the incomprehensible spirit in which it had its origin. Of course, the findings and sentence of the Court ought, without delay, to be set aside. But this is only the beginning of justice. Some positive reparation should be made to citizens who have been so deeply injured.

After reflection, the president wrote his decision to Welles, the court-martial board and the Navy:

I am unwilling for the sentence to stand and be executed, to any extent, in this case. In the absence of a more adequate motive than the evidence discloses, I am wholly unable to believe in the existence of criminal or fraudulent intent on the part of one of such well-established good character as is the accused. If the evidence went as far toward establishing a guilty profit of one or two hundred thousand dollars, as it does of one or two hundred dollars, the case would, on the question of guilt, bear a far different aspect. That on this contract, involving from one million to twelve hundred thousand dollars, the contractors should attempt a fraud which at the most could profit them only one or two hundred, or even one thousand dollars, is to my mind beyond the power of rational belief. That they did not, in such a case, strike for greater gains proves that they did not, with guilty or fraudulent intent, strike at all. The judgment and sentence are disapproved and declared null, and the accused ordered to be discharged.

Lincoln never got the opportunity to "lay my long hand upon them" who pursued the Smiths. A few short weeks after the president vacated the sentence, he was killed by an assassin's bullet.

=== Aftermath ===
After he was freed by Lincoln, Smith spent some time restoring his business. When the city mourned the death of the president, Smith was asked to lead the gathering at Tremont Temple. He then decided to go abroad and left for Europe.

There were three issues at the center of these events: The first was control of the military. The secretary of the Navy is a civilian, but he was manipulated by his assistant secretary, a career officer, into persecuting an innocent man, thereby allowing the military to follow its own agenda. Lincoln's actions shifted the power back to civilian control.

Second was the attempt by Congress to suspend the constitutional rights of individual citizens in defiance of the Bill of Rights. The basic constitutional rights of habeas corpus, a jury of peers, and a grand jury hearing before being charged, were not accorded those facing military court-martial. The 1862 Military Contractor Court-Martial act that was the basis for Smith's trial was declared unconstitutional by a federal circuit court in Kentucky in 1866 when considering a case similar to that of Franklin Smith.

Finally, the president upheld the rights of an individual against the nearly unlimited resources and power of a federal government agency, which Lincoln called, "a fight between a department and a citizen, and the citizen has no fair show". Lincoln was protecting an honest man from retribution by those in power.

== Utopia ==
The Long Depression of 1873–79 resulted in the unemployment of thousands of former industrial workers. Smith authored four articles which were published in the Boston Advertiser in 1877, and the Boston Board of Aid to Land Ownership was formed that year "to divert workers from surplus in manufacturing to Tillage of the Earth—the basis of all industries, and the primary source of all wealth". The board selected a committee to investigate possible locations for a settlement. After learning that the Cincinnati Southern Railroad was constructing a rail line to the area, they chose the Cumberland Plateau in Tennessee. Smith, who was president of the board, travelled to Tennessee in 1878 and selected a site, engaged a surveyor to plot the town, and an architect to design a hotel there. The location, which Smith named Plateau City, was the most beautiful he found. It overlooked river gorges, contained broad hills and had sweeping mountain vistas, but it was seven long miles from the railroad. By this time, the depression was ending, and unemployment was falling. A few Bostonians were reconsidering their investment in the venture, so Smith found additional investors through Thomas Hughes, the English social reformer. Hughes wanted to establish a utopian settlement for younger sons of English gentry which was classless, because class conventions in England prevented those born into high society from becoming tradesmen or farmers. In 1879, the London Board of Aid to Land Ownership became the primary investors in the Tennessee project and renamed the colony Rugby. Smith thought that the key to growth was to become a resort, where guests would buy land and settle there. Hughes disagreed and refused to spend time or money on tourist endeavors. When Smith realized that his ideas was being ignored, he divested himself of the project in 1880 and took another trip abroad.

== St. Augustine ==
=== Travel ===
As a prosperous man, Smith enjoyed traveling throughout Europe, North Africa and the Middle East, studying architecture and the history of past civilizations. During his lifetime, he took more than a dozen trips across the Atlantic, and purchased numerous works of art and artifacts.

Smith's in-laws were Quakers, but they were financially able to construct and travel to a winter home near St. Augustine, Florida after the Civil War. Following a trip to Florida to visit his wife's family, Smith decided to build his own winter residence there, but wanted his house to stand out, both in design and composition. On his next tour abroad in 1882, Smith traveled through southern Spain and found his inspiration when he toured the 12th-century Moorish Alhambra Palace in Granada, Spain. The remainder of the excursion was spent searching Spain, Egypt and Morocco for decorations and furniture. On Lake Geneva in Switzerland, Smith observed the construction of a Château which used sand from the lake bottom to make concrete; thus he solved his question of building material.

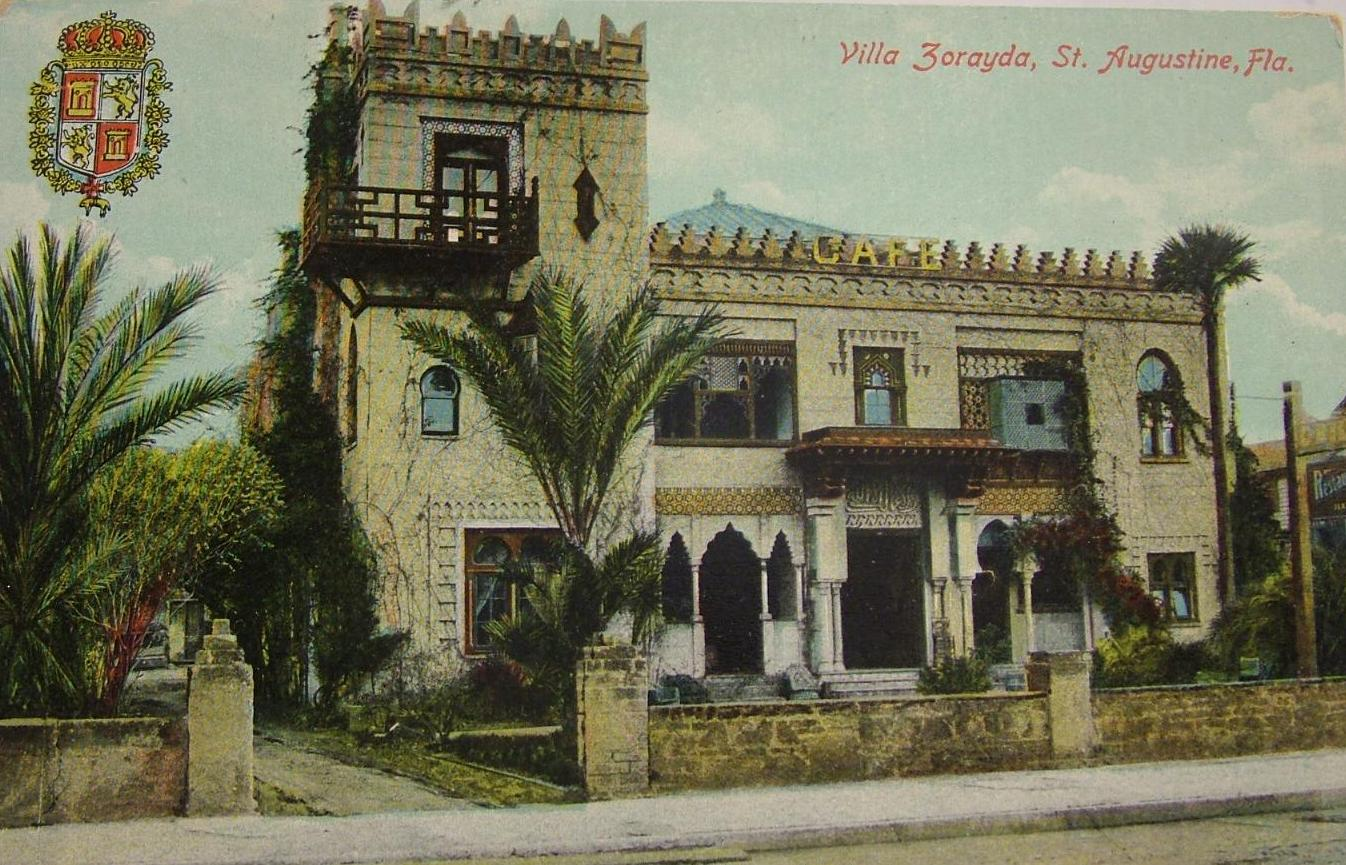
Villa Zorayda in the 1900s

=== Residence ===
In December 1883, Smith engaged a Boston mason to come to Florida to help build a special structure. They experimented making concrete blocks that used crushed coquina along with Portland cement. Satisfied with the results, they began to construct the Villa Zorayda cast in courses ten inches (250 mm) tall. After 48 hours, the concrete had hardened enough to pour the next course. The process was repeated until the desired height was reached, and the resulting structure was nearly monolithic. The material grew harder with age; after one month, it was as hard as building stone. The outside of the Villa Zorayda appears as three separate sections. To maintain structural integrity, there are railroad rails within the walls that extend the entire width of the erection. The Zorayda was not a copy of the Alhambra; it was an amalgamation of Moorish style.

=== Revolution ===
Moorish Revival architecture became the style of choice in St. Augustine. Across the country, building construction utilizing poured concrete became all the rage and replaced more costly brick in many applications.

In 1883, Henry Morrison Flagler and his new, young wife traveled to St. Augustine for their honeymoon and were impressed with Villa Zorayda. Flagler offered to buy it for his bride, but Smith would not sell. However, he planted the seed of St. Augustine's and Florida's future in Flagler's mind.

Flagler returned to St. Augustine in 1885 and made Smith an offer. If Smith could raise $50,000, Flagler would invest $150,000 and they would build a hotel together. Perhaps fortunately for Smith, he couldn't come up with the funds, so Flagler began construction of the 540-room Ponce de León Hotel by himself, but spent several times his original estimate. Smith helped train the masons on the mixing and pouring techniques he used on Zorayda.

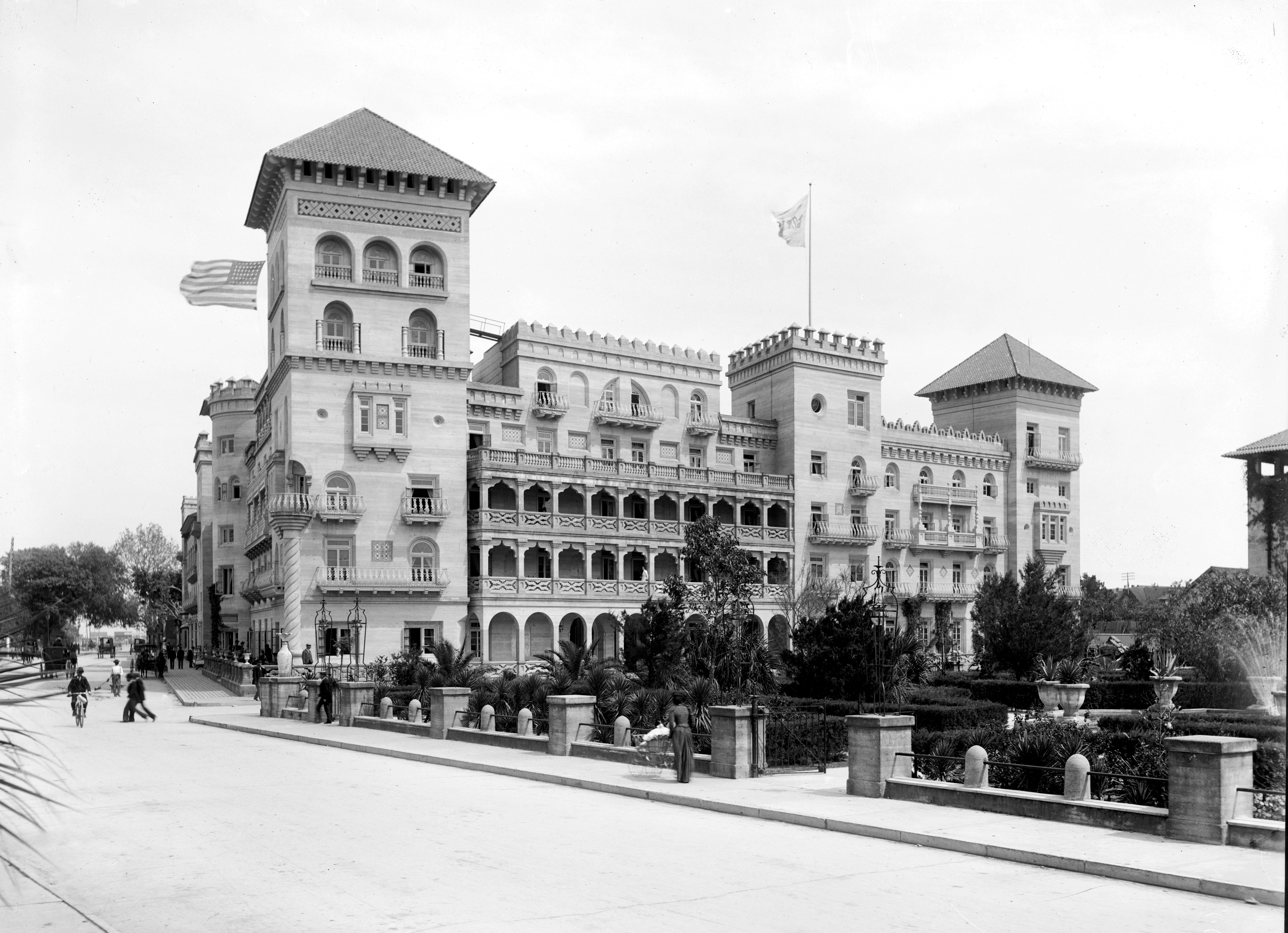
Casa Monica Hotel, renamed the Cordova Hotel c. 1891

=== Hotel ===
Henry Flagler sold Smith the land on which Smith built the Casa Monica Hotel in 1887. The Casa Monica is an impressive five-story structure, 400 feet (120 m) wide with towers on each end rising 100 feet (30 m), topped with tiled roofs. There are architectural features including turrets, balconies, parapets, ornate railings, cornices, arches, and battlements on the exterior, all composed of poured concrete and coquina. The flagpole in the center of the building serves a dual purpose: it is also a lightning rod. The hotel contained 138 guest rooms, including 14 suites. Several suites are located in the towers, with up to 3 bedrooms, and occupy 2 to 4 floors. The hotel opened on January 1, 1888, but Smith had financial troubles and was forced to sell it to Flagler after the winter season ended for $325,000. Smith built a shopping arcade across from the hotels where the hotel guests could spend money.

== Pompeia ==
After selling the Casa Monica, Smith left St. Augustine and moved to Saratoga Springs, New York. He wanted to create something educational to add culture to the town instead of gambling and horse racing for which it was known. Beginning in 1888, Smith built a full-scale reconstruction of a compilation of villas described in Edward Bulwer-Lytton's novel, The Last Days of Pompeii. The structure was 75 feet (23 m) wide and 200 feet (61 m) deep, for a total of 15,000 square feet (1,400 m^{2}). It was completed in 1889 and named Pompeia, or House of Pansa and furnished in the style of that era, 79 A.D. Smith commissioned artists and historians to copy the architecture, statues and paintings that would present a picture of the lifestyle of a Roman nobleman nearly two thousand years ago. Many of the artifacts and sculptures he purchased in Europe were displayed in the Pompeia.

The structure became a popular attraction for visitors, drawing over 60,000 people in the first four years. Smith wanted all schools in the region to visit Pompeia each year. His plan for the Acropolis and National Galleries was refined during his time there.

== Stupendous scheme ==
Franklin Smith travelled Europe extensively during his lifetime, studying the great architectural achievements and art from bygone eras. For one hundred years, the United States had directed its efforts toward industrial and commercial development while neglecting cultural development. Because America had no equivalent to the great national museums abroad, Smith began to form a plan for Washington, D.C., that would include the best work from eight major civilizations in history.

Design & Prospectus for the National Gallery

In the Spring of 1890, noted architect James Renwick Jr. was in Florida working on the bell tower design for the Cathedral Basilica of St. Augustine. One evening, he and his wife listened to Smith deliver a speech to garner support for his Design and Prospectus for a National Gallery of History of Art at Washington. Renwick endorsed the idea and offered to provide drawings, plans and illustrations for the project. Smith gratefully accepted and the firm of 'Renwick, Aspinwall & Russell' spent six months completing their contribution.

In 1891, Smith paid to print his Design and Prospectus... and distributed it widely at major cities in the northeast. Smith delivered a series of lectures, beginning at the Boston Art Club, then the Maryland Institute College of Art at Baltimore, Philadelphia's Drexel Institute, and finally New York University on December 17, 1892. However, the Panic of 1893 and depression that followed forced Smith to delay his plan until the world's economies began to recover in 1898.

Smith took every opportunity to talk about his grand scheme wherever he was, and he travelled constantly. He was a charming, enthusiastic speaker, and he made his lectures interesting. He was able to persuade many influential people to endorse his vision, and gained widespread support. Smith insisted that all he needed was $10 million and 70 acres (280,000 m^{2}) of land.

He lobbied both the House and the Senate, and made certain every member had a copy of his Design and Prospectus. He kept a file of 225 newspaper articles from 51 cities in 25 states that endorsed his plan. Another file held letters of support from politicians, educators, businessmen, scholars, museums and architects.

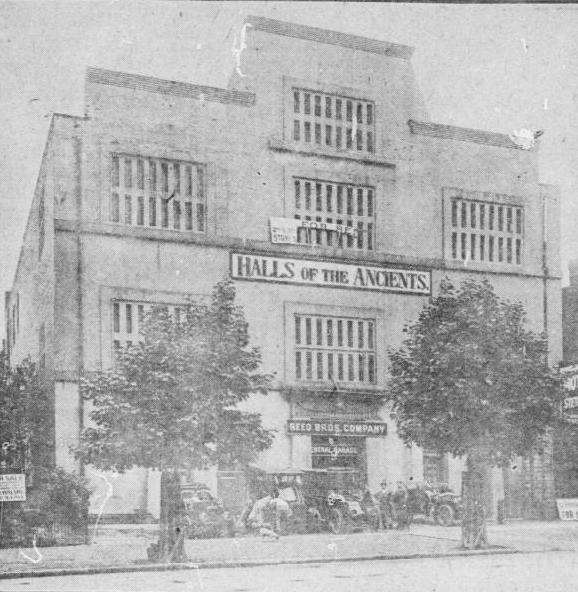
Halls of the Ancients in 1907

=== Prototype ===
Smith designed a museum in Washington, D.C., and Samuel Walter Woodward, founder of the Woodward & Lothrop department store chain, financed the construction at 1312 New York Avenue. It was built as an example of the historical and cultural displays that Smith advocated in his "Design and Prospectus". The Halls of the Ancients opened on February 4, 1899, with the entrance based on Great Hypostyle Hall, Karnak. Besides Egypt, the museum contained Greek and Roman sections that included furnishings and works of art that were historically accurate reproductions. The New York Times called it "A novel, artistic and educational institution".

=== Petition ===
Smith found a like-minded man in Massachusetts Senator George Frisbie Hoar, who presented Smith's petition to Congress on February 12, 1900. It was identified as Senate document number 209 by the 56th Congress, First Session, and 5,000 copies were printed. Unfortunately for Smith, the United States was engaged in the Philippine–American War, and Senator Hoar was one of President William McKinley's strongest critics. The majority of politicians were so preoccupied with the war that they paid scant attention to an issue of culture. When Hoar died in 1904, Smith's plan died with him. With no lawmaker to shepherd the legislation, it never made it out of committee.

Artist Conception of the National Gallery

== Death ==
Laura Smith separated from her husband during the 1890s. In the 1900 census, Franklin Smith's marital status was listed as "widowed", but Laura Smith did not die until 1915. The year 1906 ended Smith's dreams when the banks foreclosed on his properties in St. Augustine, Washington, D.C., and Saratoga Springs. Smith died in anonymity and poverty five years later, disowned by his family and residing with his older sister Mary in Boston. He was buried in the Smith family plot of Mount Auburn Cemetery at Cambridge, Massachusetts.

The Halls of the Ancients eventually was demolished and the site became a parking garage. During Prohibition, Villa Zorayda was a speakeasy with casino gambling, but today it is a museum. Pompeia was partially destroyed by a fire in 1926, became a Shriners Hall, and today is occupied by an advertising agency. The Casa Monica Hotel was purchased in 1997, renovated to its original grandeur, and re-opened in 1999.

In 2000, Franklin Smith was designated a Great Floridian by the Florida Department of State for his contributions in the development of Florida. His Great Floridian plaque is located at the Casa Monica Hotel in St. Augustine.

== Publications ==
- The Conspiracy In The U. S. Navy Department Against Franklin W. Smith Of Boston, 1861-1865 ISBN 1-141-49341-1 Nabu Press (1865)
- Wooden ships superseded by iron: Cheap Iron Indispensable For The Revival Of American Commerce ISBN 1-120-95925-X A. Mudge & Son (1869)
- The Hard Times; Agricultural Development The True Remedy ISBN 1-148-94976-3 (1877)
- The Pompeia: A Reproduction Of The House Of Pansa, In Pompeii, Buried By Vesuvius ISBN 1-104-32226-9 Kessinger Publishing (1889)
- Design & Prospectus for the National Gallery of Art and History ASIN 110497374X Gibson Brothers (1891)
- National Galleries Of History And Art: Descriptive Handbook Of The Halls Of The Ancients ISBN 1-104-97374-X Kessinger Publishing (1900)
