= Nina Larrey Duryea =

American writer

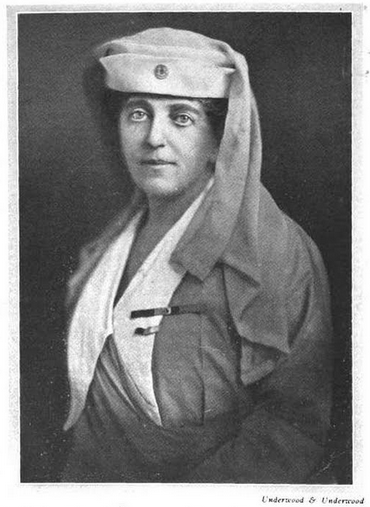
Nina Larrey Duryea, from a 1920 publication.

Nina Larrey Duryea (August 11, 1874 – November 1, 1951) was an American writer, decorated for her relief work during World War I.

== Early life ==
Nina Larrey Smith was born in Cohasset, Massachusetts, the daughter of Franklin Webster Smith and Laura Bevan Smith. Her father was a merchant in Boston, and a founder of the YMCA in the United States. She was educated in Boston and in Belgium.

== Career ==
Books by Duryea included Tales of St. Augustine (1891), Among the Palms (1903), House of Seven Gabblers (1911), The Voice Unheard: A Story of Dinard (1913), A Sentimental Dragon (1916), The Soul of Fighting France (1918), Mallorca the Magnificent (1927), and The Pride of Maura (1932). Of Duryea's A Sentimental Dragon, a magazine editor promised that "the characters are very much alive, the situations are drawn with deft and delicious humor, and the dialogue is filled with sparkling brilliants and epigrams that make one stop to read them a second time."

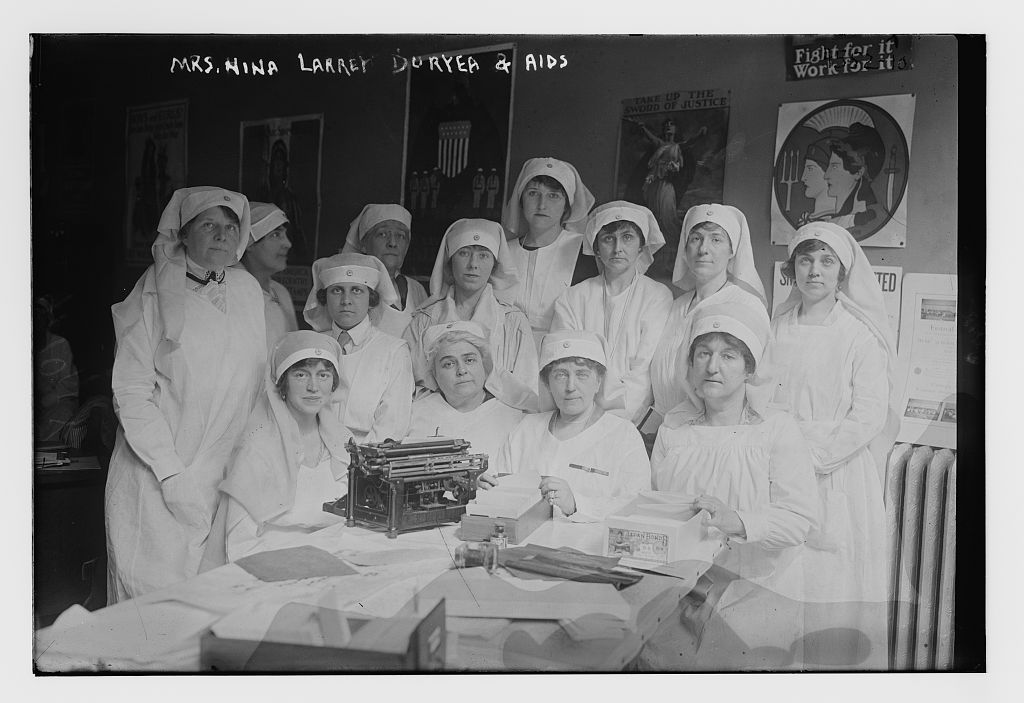
Mrs. Nina Larrey Duryea & aides (LOC) (25839560764)

Duryea spent her summers in Brittany. In autumn of 1914, Life magazine, The New York Times, and many other news outlets published Duryea's letters describing the refugees arriving in her town, Duryea founded Duryea War Relief (Secours Duryea) at Dinard. From a base in Roye, Somme, and a depot at Lille, she and her assistants distributed clothing, food, garden tools, medicine and other necessities to over 70,000 war survivors and refugees. Her organization also opened a children's center offering meals and a safe playground (while outdoor play was still dangerous from shrapnel, explosives and other hazards), a hospital for children with tuberculosis, and an orphanage. Duryea was named a member of the French Legion of Honour for her work, with further decorations from Belgium, Italy, Russia and Montenegro.

After the war, she served as vice president of the International Revival of Industrial Arts, building a market for handicrafts from war-affected regions. She also invented a textile named Sona and a garment called Torsolite, for protective use in hazardous situations.

In 1919, a comedy by Duryea, Mrs. Drummond's War Relief, was produced in New York, directed by Hilda Spong, with Duryea and others raising funds and giving speeches about post-war reconstruction during intermissions. Another play by Duryea, Love — Common or Preferred, was produced as a fundraiser in 1932.

== Personal life ==
Nina Larrey Smith married inventor Chester Burrell Duryea in 1898. The couple had one son, Chester, before separating in 1903. In 1914, her ex-husband was committed to Matteawan State Hospital in New York after killing his father, Civil War general Hiram Duryea. Smith died in 1951 in Great Barrington, Massachusetts, at the age of 77.
