= Felix F. de Crano =

American painter

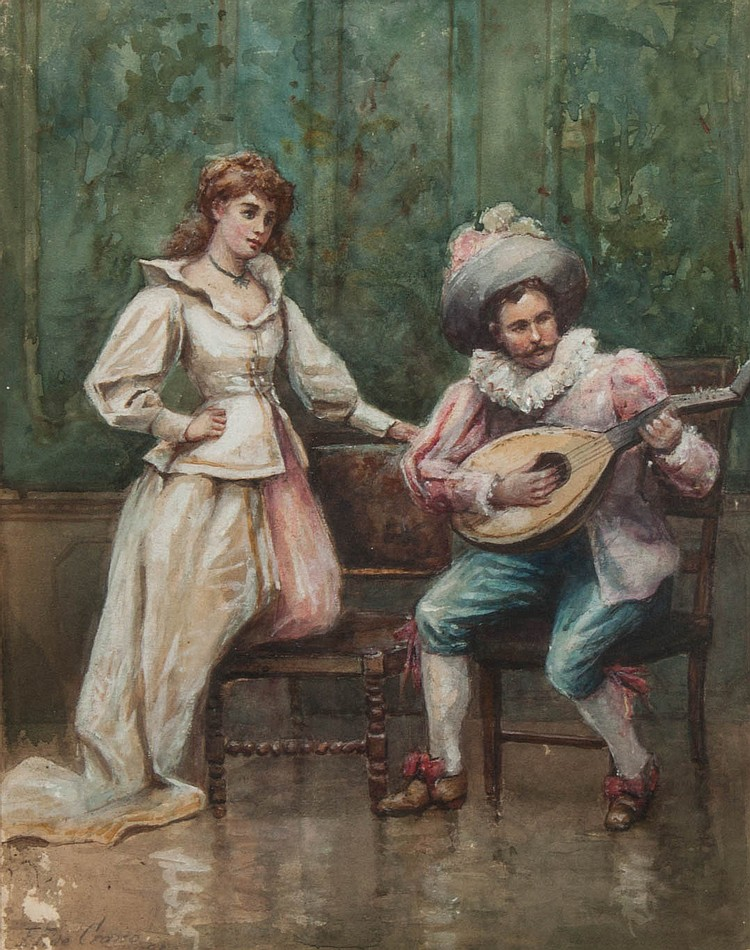
The Serenade (1893), watercolor on paper

Felix F. de Crano (1842 – September 15, 1908) (often written as DeCrano) was an impressionist artist in New England, St. Augustine, Florida, and Europe. He is listed as a Great Floridian.

De Crano studied in London, Paris, and Rome. He came to St. Augustine, Florida, from Philadelphia in 1893 to be part of Henry Flagler's Ponce de Leon Artist Colony. De Crano came to the colony with his wife in 1893 and lived in a house that later became Craig Funeral Home and eventually the Flagler College Auditorium. De Crano did portraits, landscapes, genre paintings and still-lifes. He is known for his lush garden views and bright realistic flower paintings sold to tourists. The artist colony was discontinued in 1902 when Flagler relocated to Palm Beach.

De Crano died September 15, 1908, in Wallingford, Pennsylvania. A marker at Ponce de Leon Studios on Valencia Street on the campus of Flagler College commemorates his life.
