= Lightner Museum =

Historic museum in Florida, US

- Alcazar Hotel
- U.S. National Register of Historic Places
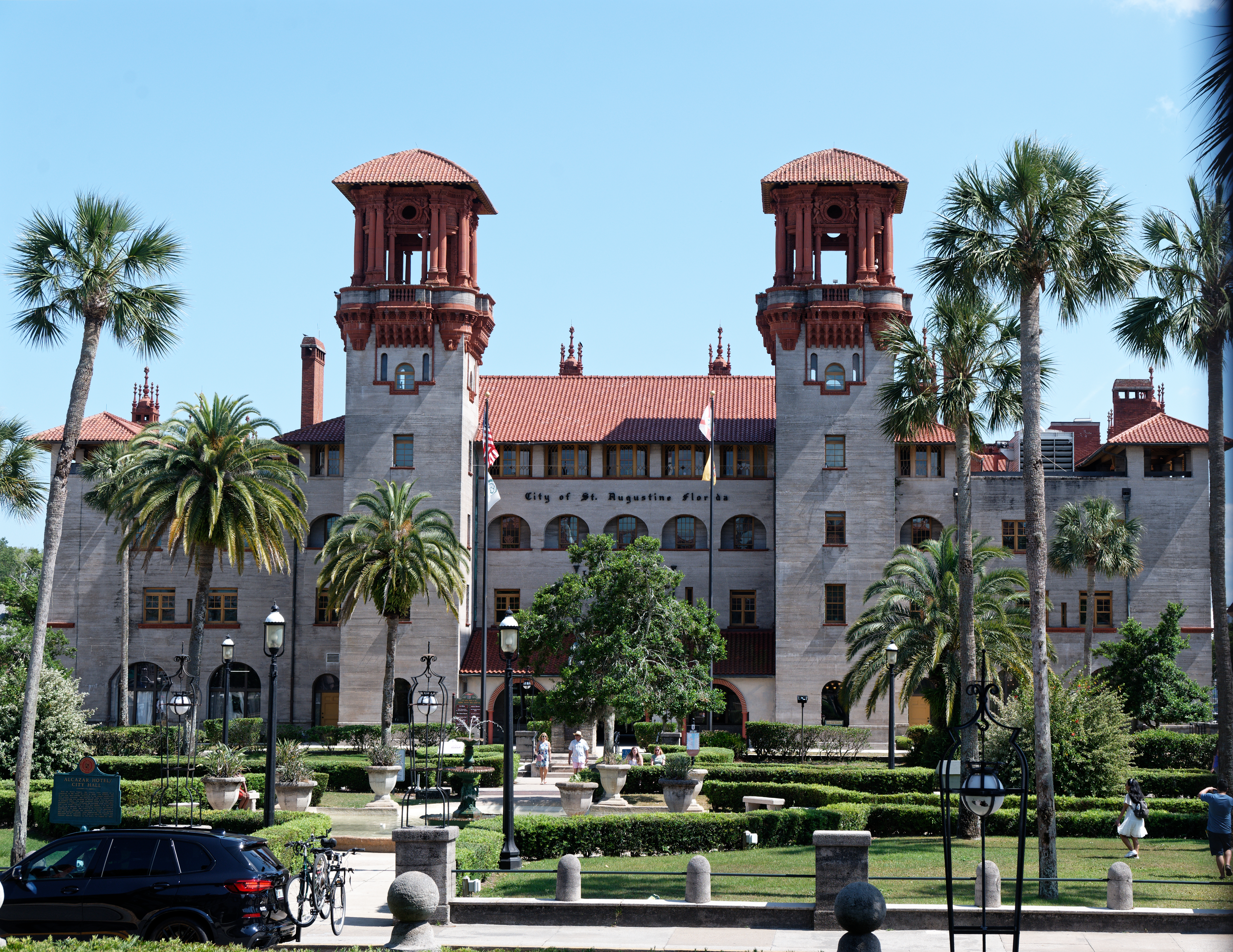
- The Lightner Museum, originally the Alcazar Hotel, with a statue of Pedro Menéndez de Avilés on the ground.

- Location within Florida Location within the United States
- Location: 75 King Street; St. Augustine, Florida
- Coordinates: 29°53′30″N 81°18′51″W
- Built: 1887 (museum opened 1948)
- Architect: Carrère and Hastings
- Architectural style: Spanish Renaissance Revival
- Website: www.lightnermuseum.org
- NRHP reference No.: 71001013
- Added to NRHP: February 24, 1971

The Lightner Museum is a museum of antiques, mostly American Gilded Age pieces, housed within the historic Hotel Alcazar building in downtown St. Augustine. This 1887 Spanish Renaissance Revival style building is listed on the National Register of Historic Places.

== History ==
=== Hotel Alcazar ===
The hotel was commissioned by Henry Flagler, to appeal to wealthy tourists who traveled south for the winter on his railroad, the Florida East Coast Railway. It was designed by New York City architects Carrère and Hastings, in the Spanish Renaissance Revival style. The firm also designed the Ponce de León Hotel across the street, now part of the campus of Flagler College. Both structures are notable for being among the earliest examples of poured concrete buildings in the world. These architects later designed the New York Public Library in New York City and the Russell Senate Office Building in Washington, D.C.

The hotel had a steam room, massage parlor, sulfur baths, gymnasium, a three-story ballroom, and the world's largest indoor swimming pool; however, after years as an elegant winter resort for wealthy patrons, the hotel closed in 1932.

On August 20, 1947 Chicago publisher Otto C. Lightner purchased the building to convert the old hotel into a hobbies museum. He used the space to house several collections, including his own extensive collection of Victorian era art. He then turned it over to the city of St. Augustine and the museum opened to the public in 1948.

The building is an attraction in itself, centering on an open courtyard with palm trees and a stone arch bridge over a koi pond.

== Museum ==
The museum occupies three floors of the former Hotel Alcazar and is housed in the former health facilities of the hotel, including the spa and the Victorian Turkish bath, in addition to its three-story ballroom.

The first floor of the museum houses a Victorian Science and Industry Room displays shells, rocks, minerals, and Native American artifacts in beautiful Gilded Age cases, as well as stuffed birds, a small Egyptian mummy, a model steam engine, elaborate examples of Victorian glassblowing, a golden elephant bearing the world on its back, and a shrunken head. Moreover, the first floor contains a music room, filled with mechanized musical instruments—including player pianos, reproducing pianos, orchestrions, and others—dating from the 1870s through the 1920s. It formerly featured a Victorian village, with shop fronts representing emporia selling period wares; this area is now the gift shop.

The second floor contains examples of cut glass, Victorian art glass and stained-glass work from Louis Comfort Tiffany's studio. The third floor, in the ballroom's upper balcony, exhibits paintings, sculptures, and furniture, including a grande escritoire created for Louis Bonaparte, Napoleon's brother and King of Holland between 1806 and 1810. The Ballroom Gallery has oil paintings by Paul Trouillebert (Cleopatra & the Dying Messenger), Léon Comerre (Maid of Honor), and Albert Bierstadt (In the Yosemite). It also has sculptures by Jean-Baptiste Carpeaux and Randolph Rogers.

On view from the ballroom's upper balcony is the now drained swimming pool. The pool now hosts the Cafe Alcazar.

The Lightner Museum partners with local tourism initiatives such as Visit Florida and Florida Attractions Association. In 2021, the museum developed a local artists initiative called Lightner Local, with support from the Benjamin and Jean Troemel Arts Foundation, awarding exhibition space for artists who lived in Northeast and Central Florida. The Lightner is a member of Culture Builds Florida, the Division of Arts and Culture for the state of Florida, as well as the St Johns Cultural Council. In 2021, the museum completed improvements to its storage facilities using a $162,000 grant award from the Institute of Museum and Library Services.

== Gallery ==
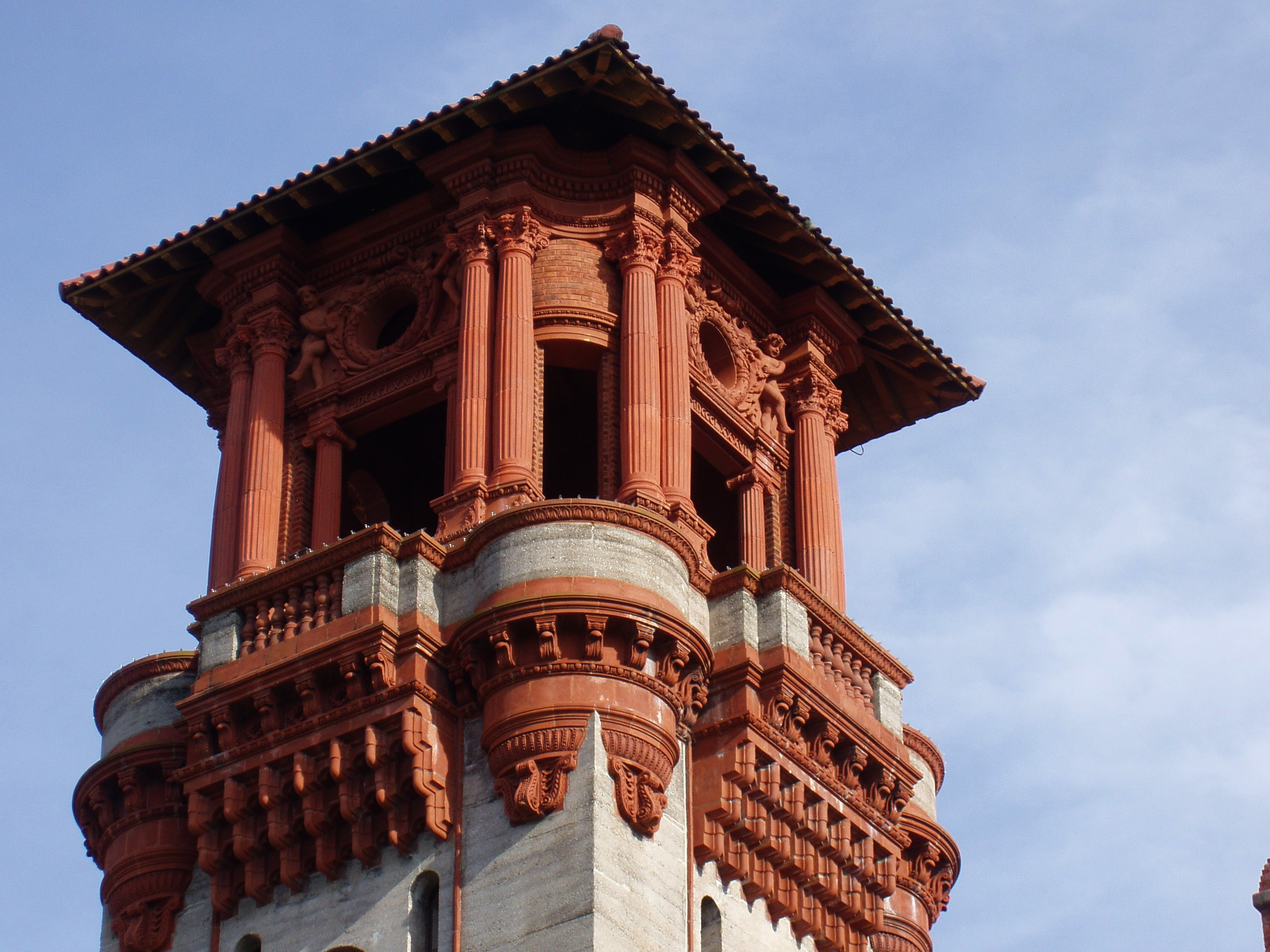
Tower detail of the Lightner Museum

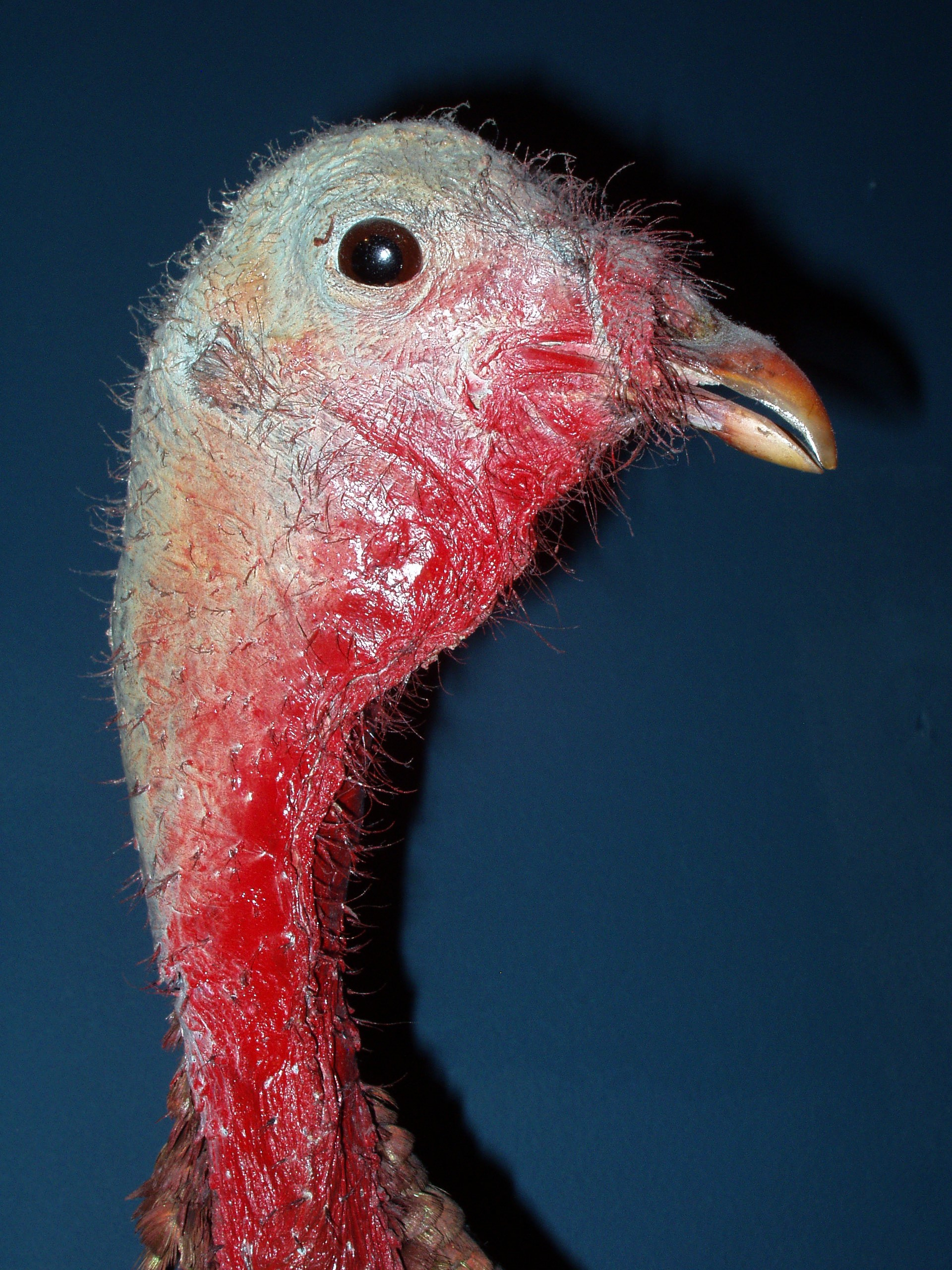
Taxidermic bird (detail) at the Lightner Museum

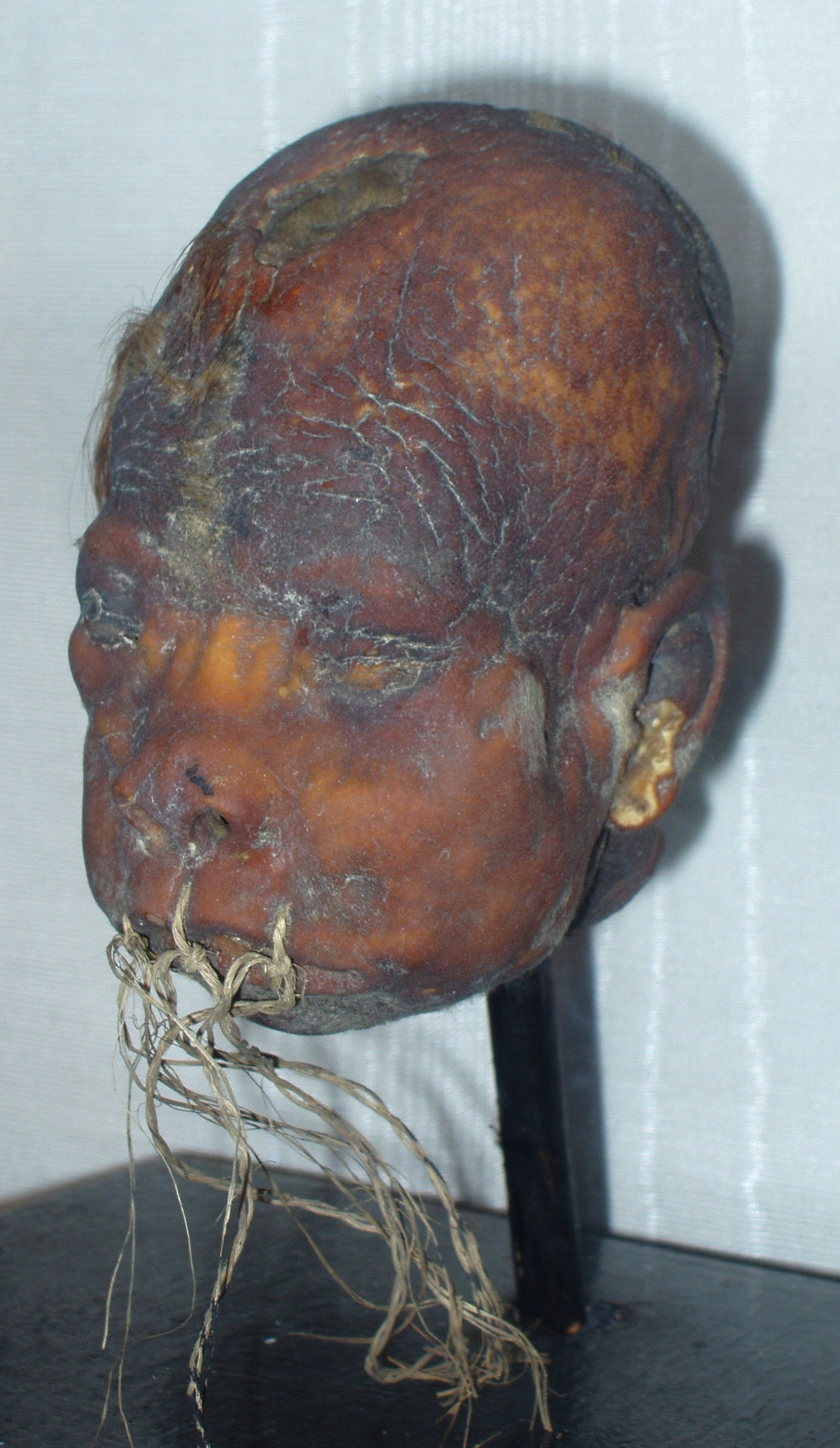
Shrunken head exhibited at the Lightner Museum

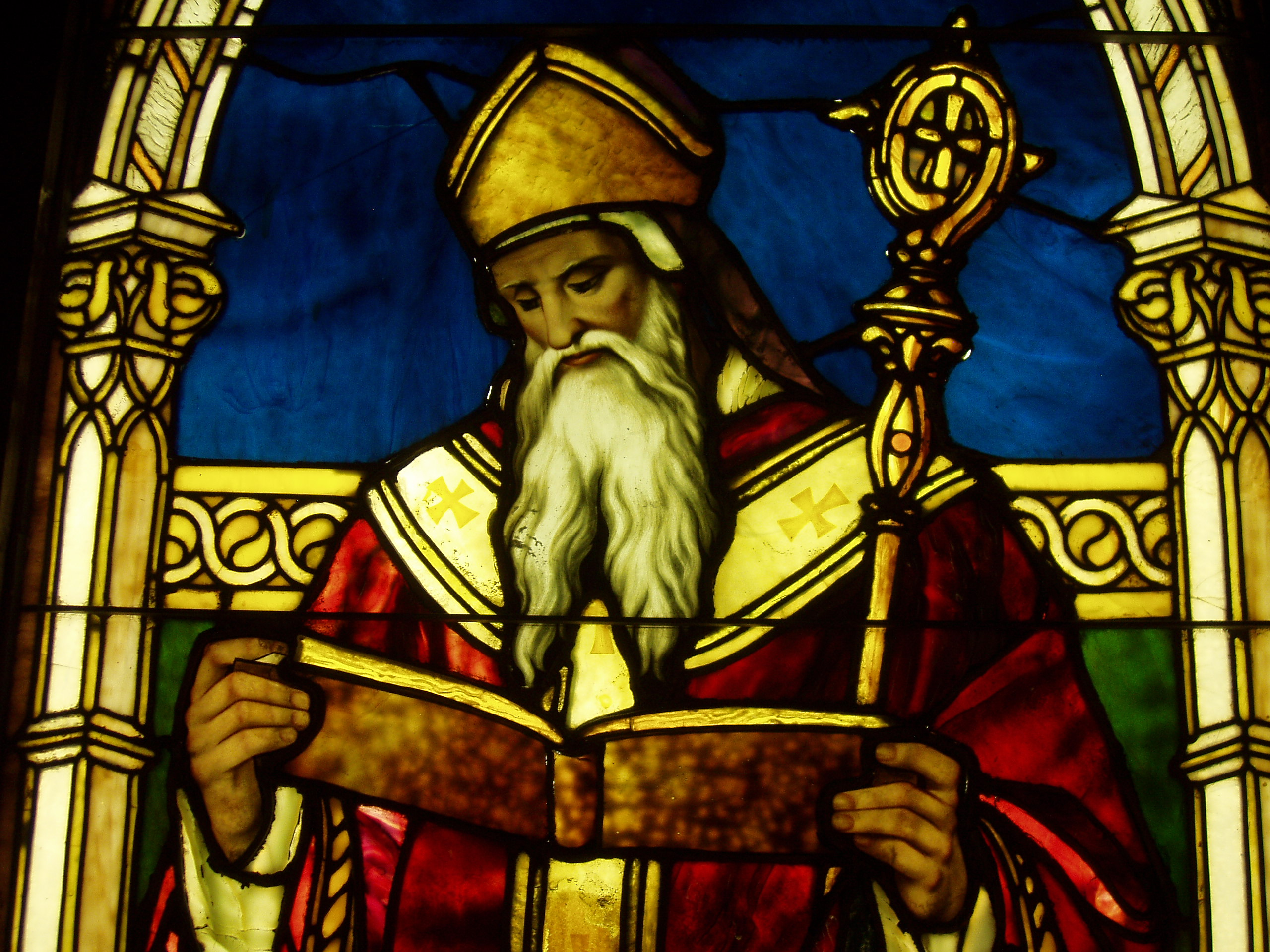
Louis Comfort Tiffany stained-glass window of St. Augustine, exhibited at the Lightner Museum

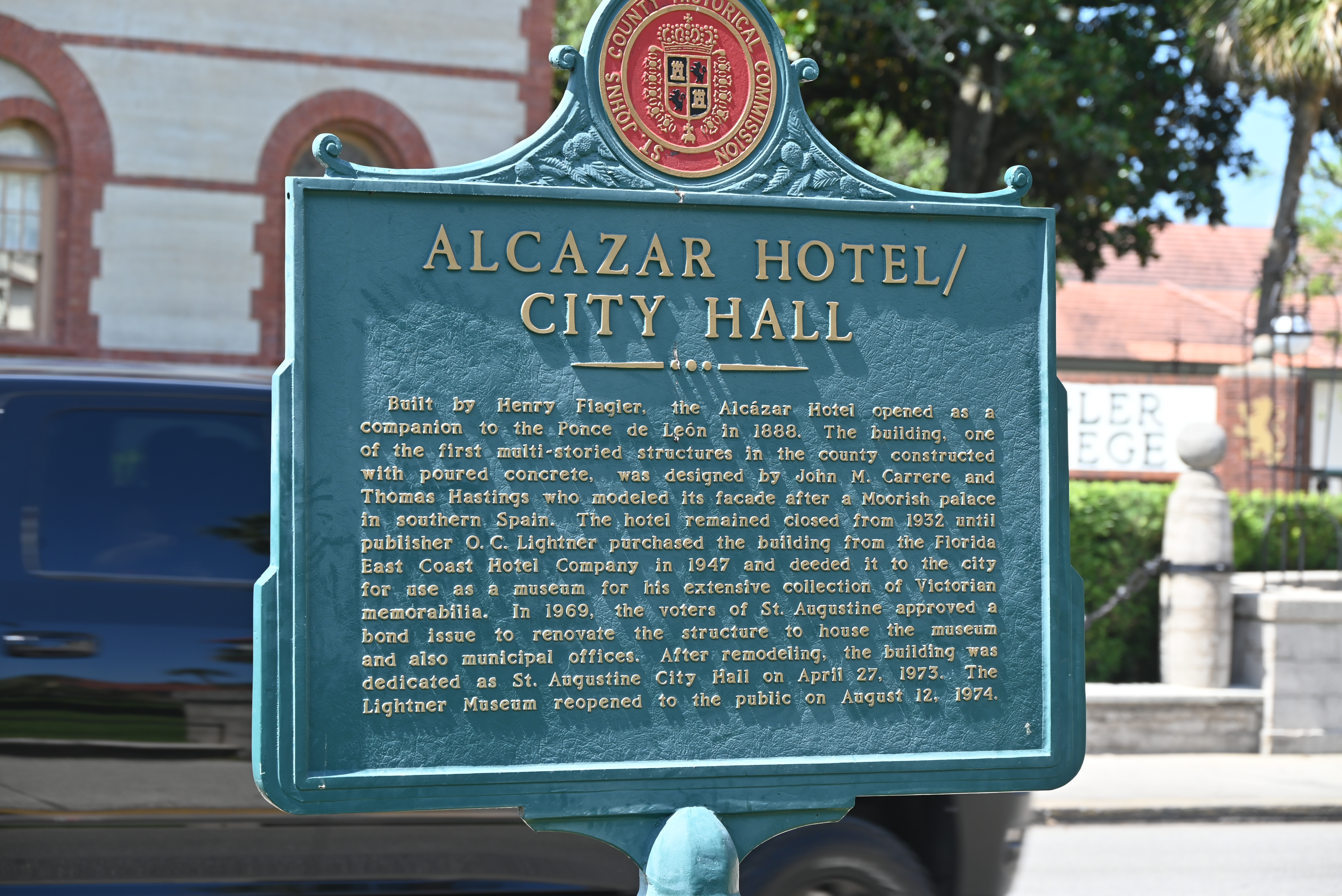
Historical marker

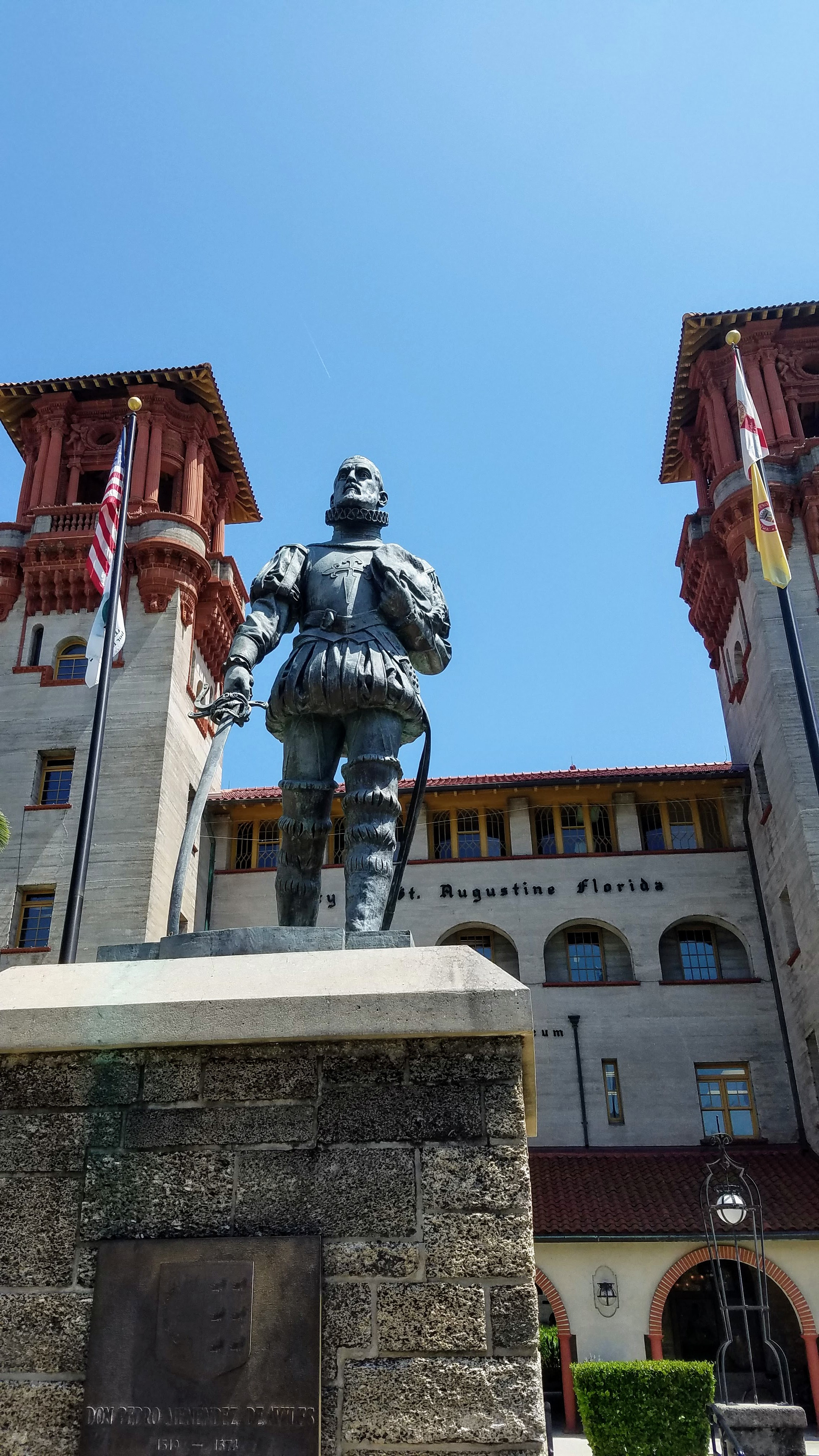
Pedro Menéndez de Avilés Statue - May 2019

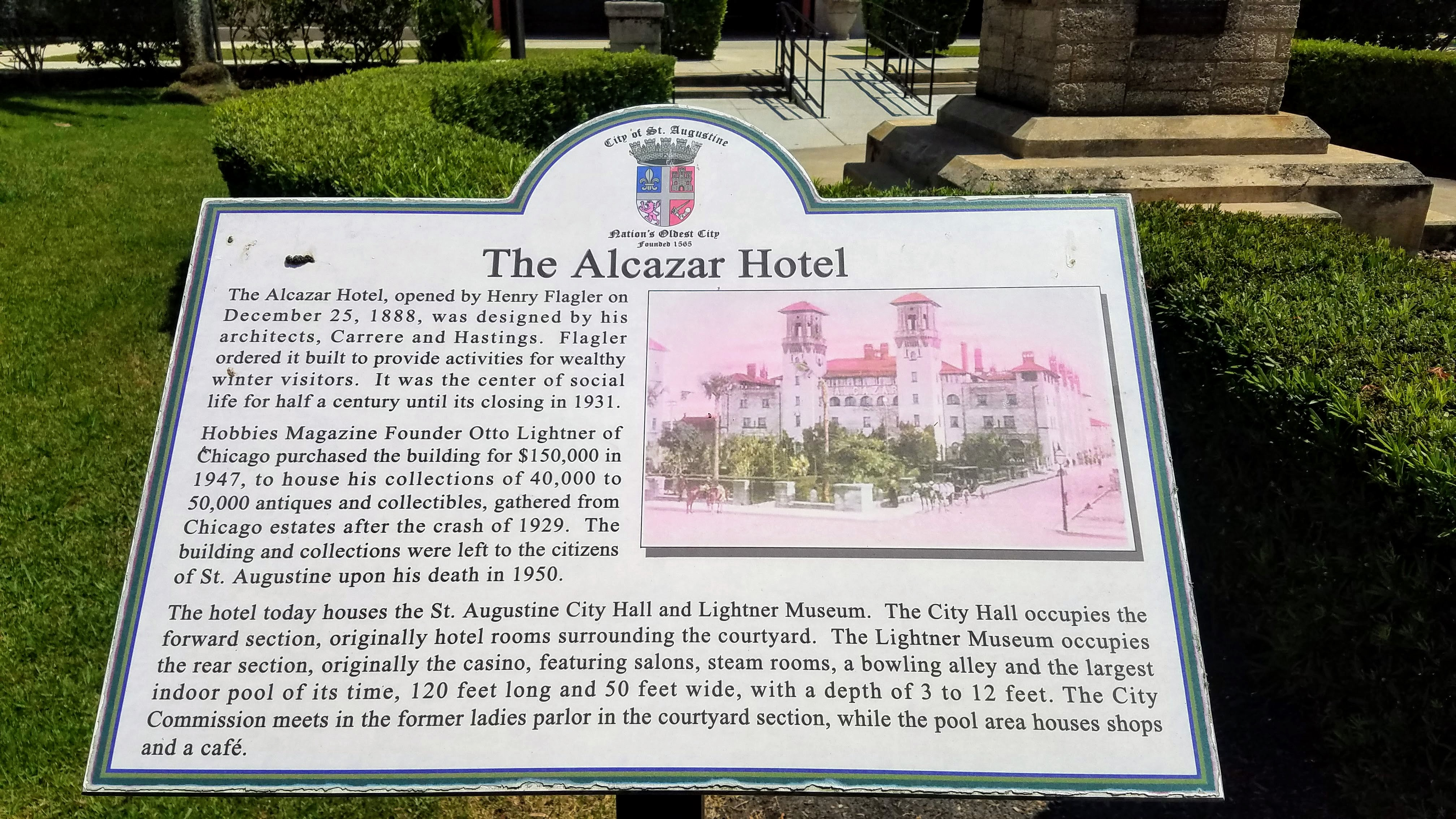
Alcazar Hotel Historic Marker

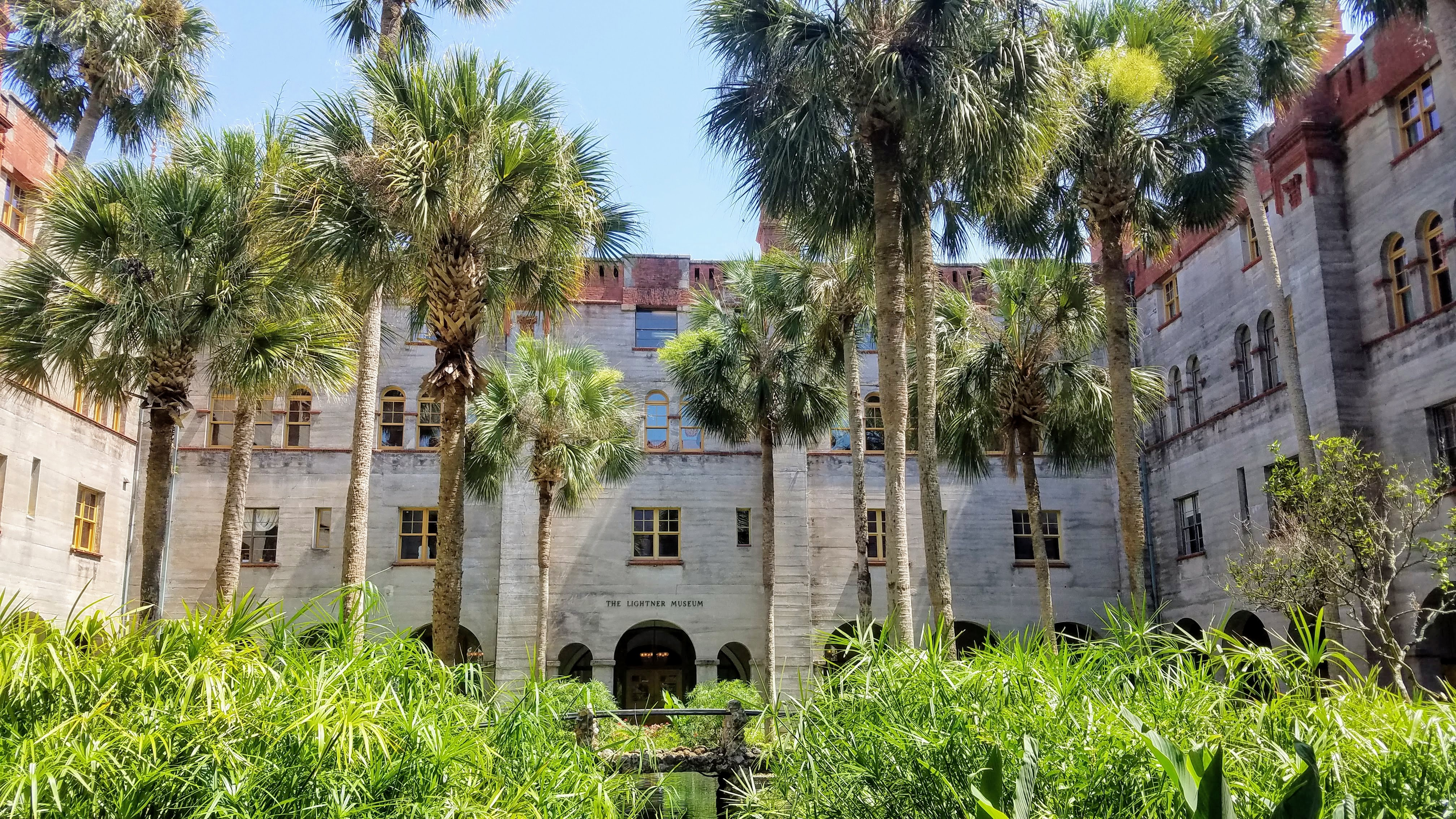
Courtyard - May 2019

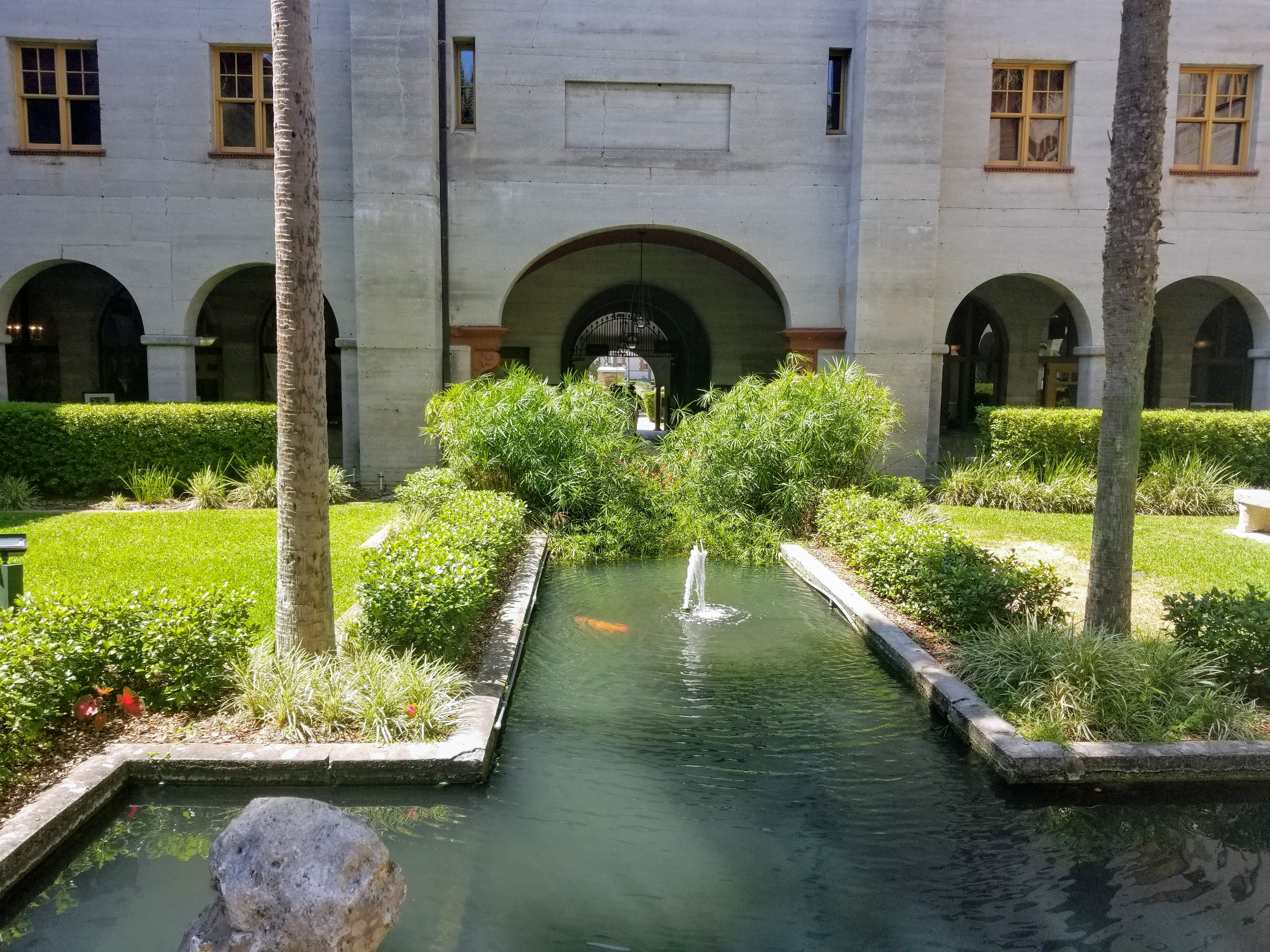
Courtyard Koi Pond - May 2019

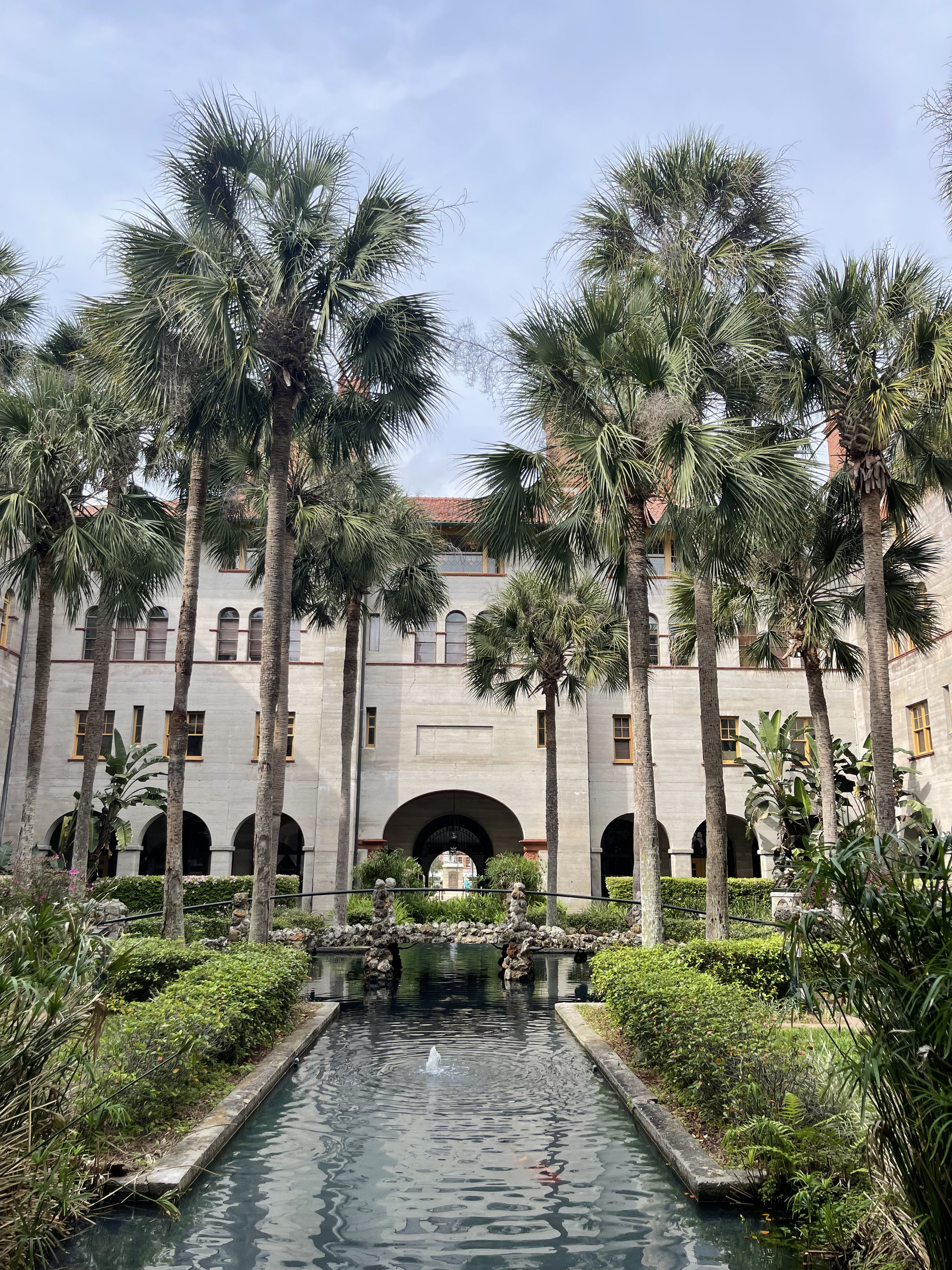
Lightner Courtyard

== See also ==
- National Register of Historic Places listings in St. Johns County, Florida
