= Kenan (surname) =

Surname

Kenan is a surname and may refer to:

- James Kenan, American milita officer and politician
- Mary Lily Kenan, American heiress and philanthropist
- Owen Rand Kenan, American politician
- Randall Kenan, American writer
- Richard M. Kenan, American politician
- Sarah Graham Kenan, American heiress and philanthropist
- Thomas S. Kenan, American planter
- Thomas Kenan (Civil War), American soldier and politician
- William Rand Kenan, American white supremacist
- William R. Kenan Jr., American chemist

== See also ==
- Kenan (name)
