= Sarah Graham Kenan =

American philanthropist (1876–1968)

- Born: February 17, 1876; Wilmington, North Carolina, U.S.
- Died: March 16, 1968 (aged 92); Wilmington, North Carolina, U.S.
- Resting place: Oakdale Cemetery
- Education: St. Mary's Junior College
- Occupation: philanthropist
- Spouse: Graham Kenan
- Parents: William Rand Kenan; Mary Hargrave
- Relatives: William R. Kenan, Jr. (brother)

Sarah Graham Kenan (February 17, 1876 – March 16, 1968) was an American heiress and philanthropist. She inherited a third of her sister's share of the Standard Oil fortune in 1917 and established the Sarah Graham Kenan Foundation. Through her foundation, Kenan contributed financially to various institutions including the Episcopal Diocese of East Carolina, the University of North Carolina, Duke University, Saint Mary's School, and the Duplin County Board of Education. Her home, located in the Market Street Mansion District in Wilmington, North Carolina, now serves as the official residence of the chancellor of the University of North Carolina at Wilmington. In 1930, through an endowment she made, the Southern Historical Collection was established at the University of North Carolina at Chapel Hill.

== Early life and family ==
Sarah Graham Kenan was born on February 17, 1876, in Wilmington, North Carolina, to William Rand Kenan, Sr. and Mary Hargrave Kenan. Her father, a Civil War veteran, businessman, white supremacist, and trustee of the University of North Carolina, participated in the Wilmington massacre in 1898. She was a sister of William R. Kenan Jr. and a sister-in-law of Henry Flagler, who co-founded the Standard Oil Company with John D. Rockefeller. Kenan was a descendant of the politician and American Revolutionary War veteran James Kenan. Her grandfather was the Confederate politician Owen Rand Kenan. Her family, members of North Carolina's planter class, owned Liberty Hall Plantation in Kenansville, a town named after her family.

Kenan was educated in New York and in Raleigh, graduating from St. Mary's Junior College in 1893.

== Philanthropy ==
After her brother-in-law's death, his oil fortune was inherited by her sister, Mary Lily Kenan Flagler Bingham. At her death in 1917, the fortune was divided equally between Kenan, her brother William, and her sister, Jessie Kenan Wise. She established the Sarah Graham Kenan Foundation and, throughout her life, made charitable contributions exceeded $12 million. She was a patron of the Catherine Kennedy Home in Wilmington, the Duplin County Board of Education, New Hanover County private schools, the Episcopal Diocese of East Carolina, St. James Episcopal Church, Duke University School of Medicine, the North Carolina Museum of Life and Science, Saint Mary's School, Durham Academy, Thalian Hall, the Kenansville Board of Education, and the University of North Carolina at Wilmington.

In 1930, she helped the University of North Carolina at Chapel Hill start the Southern Historical Collection in their new library, which included letters, diaries, and plantation records. She provided a $25,000 endowment for the project. In 1965, she established the Graham Kenan Professorship at the University of North Carolina School of Law in honor of her husband. In 1968 she created additional professorships at the UNC School of Medicine and UNC Kenan-Flagler Business School.

== Personal life ==
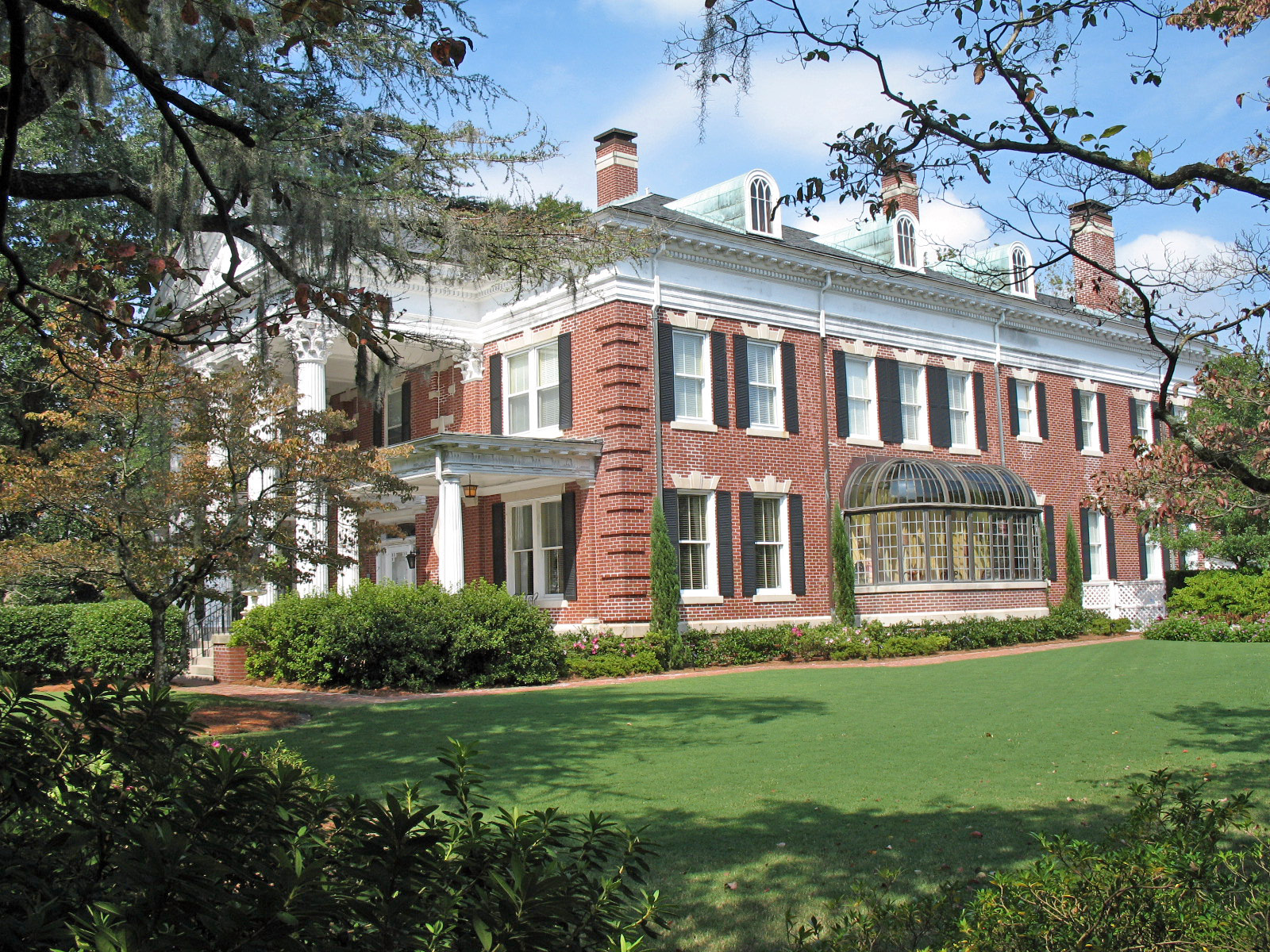
Kenan's home in Wilmington

Kenan married her cousin, the attorney Graham Kenan, on December 19, 1912. Her husband died on February 5, 1920, in New York City. They had no children. After her husband's death, Kenan purchased a brick colonial house on Market Street in Wilmington. She travelled extensively, spending time in Palm Beach and St. Augustine, Florida, and Lake Placid, New York.

== Death and legacy ==
Kenan died on March 16, 1968, in Wilmington. A funeral service was held at St. James Episcopal Church on March 20, 1968. She was buried next to her parents in Oakdale Cemetery.

After her death, her nephew, James Graham Kenan, gifted her home on Market Street to the state for the board of trustees of the University of North Carolina at Wilmington. The house is now used as the official residence of the university's chancellor. The Sarah Graham Kenan Auditorium on the university's campus is named after her. The library at Saint Mary's School is named in her honor. The University of North Carolina School of the Arts named a scholarship after her.
