= Isaac I. Moody Jr. =

American businessman and politician

- Early colorized photograph c. 1895
- Born: October 27, 1874; Appling County, Georgia
- Died: December 17, 1918 (aged 44); Bunnell, Florida
- Occupations: Woods rider, postmaster, businessman and politician
- Title: City Commissioner, County Commissioner, State Representative
- Spouse: Dora Lee (m. 1901–1918)
- Children: Gladys M. Moody Starkey (1906–1973); Leona Moody Knight (1908–1999); Dorothy Moody Locke (1910–1980)
- Parents: Isaac I. Moody Sr. (1847–1890) (father); Martha Elmira Miles Moody (1847–1920) (mother)

Isaac I. Moody Jr. (October 27, 1874 – December 17, 1918) was born in Appling County, Georgia, and in the early 1890s moved to St. Johns County, Florida, where he first worked in the turpentine business as a woods rider near present-day Bunnell, Florida. He ventured into various businesses including turpentine, shingle milling, real estate and banking. After getting into politics he quickly gained local and statewide influence and was instrumental in the establishment of Flagler County, Florida, in 1917. He became a 32nd degree Mason (both Scottish and York rites), and was elected as Worshipful Master of the Bunnell Lodge No. 200 in 1918. Moody was also a member of the Morocco Temple of Shriners at Jacksonville, FL. Today, he is remembered as the "Father of Flagler County."

== Business ventures ==
Moody formed a partnership in 1903 with James Frank "Major" Lambert (1862–1938), whom he met while working in the turpentine business, and together they purchased a shingle mill in Bunnell Stop (a rail stop which later became the city of Bunnell, Florida) from Fairhead and Strawn of Jacksonville, Florida. Two years later they purchased 30,000 acres of land around Bunnell and built homes and a turpentine still. Moody became the postmaster in Bunnell after a new post office was built.

In 1909, the Bunnell Development Company was chartered and Isaac I. Moody became its president; Claude E. Stewart of Jacksonville, vice president; J. R. Stone of Jacksonville, 2nd vice president; and James Frank Lambert, secretary and treasurer. All obtained equal ownership with each getting 25 shares of the venture.

The Bunnell Development Company started an advertising campaign aimed at people in the northeastern United States and placed ads in northern newspapers. An office was established in Chicago. They sectioned off ten- and twenty-acre tracts of land and transported people to the area for personal visits via the Florida East Coast Railway started by Flagler County's namesake Henry M. Flagler (1830–1913).

The town of Bunnell was chartered in 1913 and Issac I. Moody was appointed as a Councilman. In 1913, Moody was re-elected as President of the Bunnell State Bank.

== Political career ==
Moody held several political offices: Councilman for the Town of Bunnell (took office in 1913); County Commissioner for St. Johns County (District No. 3 - took office in 1911); Chairman of the Board for St. Johns County (elected in 1912, and re-elected in 1916); and was Flagler County's first State Representative (appointed in 1918).

== The Founding of Flagler County, Florida ==
In the early 1900s, people living in what is today Flagler County, which was then part of St. Johns County, had to travel many miles to transact business at the county seats of St. Augustine (St. Johns County) and Deland (Volusia County). This was a time-consuming, costly and an annoying inconvenience while the area's population and business activities were growing. These challenges fueled the desire of local residents to petition the Florida Legislature for the creation of a new county. An independent county also meant that local community leaders would have more control over political, administrative and economic decisions.

A local delegation attended the 1917 session of the Florida Legislature to convince the state Senate and House of Representatives that a new county needed to be established. This delegation was led by Isaac I. Moody Jr. who was chairman of the Board of County Commissioners of St. Johns County and represented a considerable portion of the area. The Senate and House of Representatives passed the legislation and Flagler County was founded on April 28, 1917.

Legislative delegations from St. Johns and Volusia counties worked with Senator William A. McWilliams (1863–1941) of St. Augustine to establish the borders for the new county. An allocation of 571 square miles which came from the southern section of St. Johns County and the northern section of Volusia County were incorporated to form Flagler County.

=== The Naming of Flagler County ===
Some members of the legislative delegation proposed the name of Moody County, but Isaac I. Moody declined having the county named after himself and suggested the name of Flagler County in honor of Henry Morrison Flagler. Some of the delegation thought the name "Flagler County", would entice Henry Flagler's widow, Mary Lily Kenan Flagler Bingham (1867–1917), to donate money to build a new county courthouse. She never donated any money, however, and died on July 27, 1917, soon after the county was founded.

== Death ==
Late in 1918, while in Tallahassee, Florida at a State Representative's session in the State Capitol building Moody contacted influenza (1918 flu pandemic). He returned home to Bunnell, Florida but struggled to overcome the flu complicated by double pneumonia. He died on December 17, 1918, at the age of 44.

== Legacy ==
Issac I. Moody has long been recognized as the "Father of Flagler County". State Road 11 (now known as State Road 100), between Bunnell and Flagler Beach, was renamed to Moody Boulevard by the 1949 Florida House Bill No. 42. Two Flagler County parks are named after Moody: the Moody Homestead Park is a 3.4-acre park located in Bunnell and is the former homestead of Isaac I. Moody and his brother Robert Moody, both of whom built houses on this site in 1916. The property was purchased with Environmentally Sensitive Lands (ESL) program funds, after being approved by the voters of Flagler County in 2008. The Moody Boat Launch is located at 825 Moody Lane in Flagler Beach on the eastern side of the Intracoastal Waterway and south of State Road 100. This boat launch park allows access to the Intracoastal Waterway, fishing from its pier and has picnic areas.
