= Kenan (disambiguation) =

Kenan was a patriarch mentioned in the Hebrew Bible.

Kenan may also refer to:

- Kenan (name)
- Kenan (surname)
- Cianán (fl. 489), Irish saint
- Kenan Institute for Ethics, Duke University
- Kenan Systems, a billing software company acquired by Lucent and later by Comverse
- Kenan (TV series), a 2021 American comedy series
- Kenan & Kel, a 1997 Nickelodeon sitcom

== See also ==
- Conan (disambiguation)
- Cynan
