= William Rand Kenan =

American merchant (1845-1903)

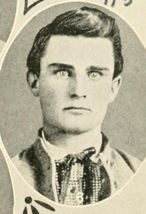

Collector of the Port of Wilmington
- In office 1889–1893
- President: Grover Cleveland
- Preceded by: John C. Dancy
- Succeeded by: John C. Dancy

Personal details
- Born: August 4, 1845 Kenansville, North Carolina, U.S.
- Died: April 14, 1903 (aged 57) Wilmington, North Carolina, U.S.
- Resting place: Oakdale Cemetery
- Party: Democratic
- Spouse: Mary Hargrave
- Children: 4 (including William, Sarah, and Mary)
- Parent(s): Owen Rand Kenan (father); Sarah Rebecca Graham (mother)
- Relatives: Henry Flagler (son in law), Lawrence Lewis Jr. (grandson)
- Education: University of North Carolina

Military service
- Allegiance: Confederate States
- Branch/service: Army
- Rank: Captain
- Commands: 43rd North Carolina Infantry Regiment • Company A
- Battles/wars: American Civil War

William Rand Kenan Sr. (August 4, 1845 – April 14, 1903) was an American merchant, military officer, and public official. He served as the Collector of the Port of Wilmington under President Grover Cleveland. Kenan was a prominent segregationist and white supremacist who was one of the lead perpetrators of the Wilmington massacre in 1898. In 1903, he was appointed to the board of trustees of the University of North Carolina.

== Early life and education ==
Kenan was born on August 4, 1845 in Kenansville, North Carolina to the planter and politician Owen Rand Kenan and Sarah Rebecca Graham Kenan. He grew up on his family's plantation, Liberty Hall. He was educated at Grove Academy and, in 1860, enrolled at the University of North Carolina.

== Career ==
Kenan withdrew from school in 1863 to enlist in the Confederate States Army during the American Civil War, serving as a private in the Company A Duplin Rifles of the 43rd North Carolina Infantry Regiment. He was promoted to the rank of captain.

After the war, he moved to Wilmington, North Carolina and worked as an insurance agent and wholesale merchant. Under President Grover Cleveland, Kenan served as Collector of the Port of Wilmington.

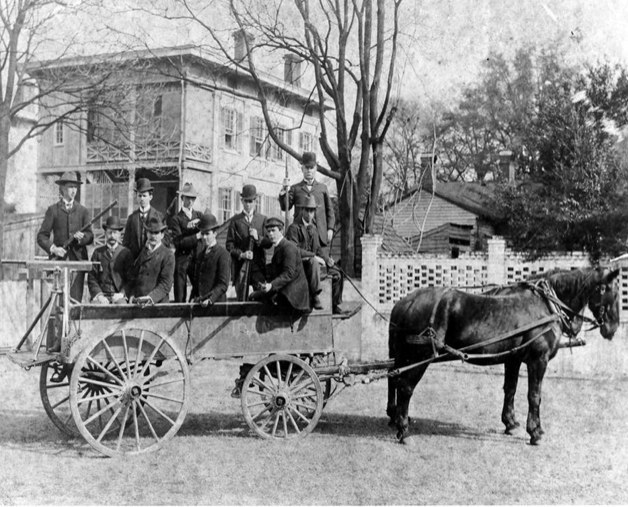
Kenan (standing on the far right) with the Wilmington Light Infantry Machine Gun Squad in 18989

In 1898, Kenan was the commander of the Wilmington Light Infantry Machine Gun Squad, a unit of Red Shirts who murdered at least twenty-five Black people during the Wilmington massacre. The unit had machine guns and were capable of firing 420 bullets per minute, gunning down Black residents in Wilmington at the intersection of Sixth Street and Brunswick Street. The unit used a mounted a Colt .23 caliber machine gun to a horse-drawn wagon and fired it while riding through the streets. Kenan wrote about his involvement in the massacre in his memoir.

In February 1903, he was appointed a trustee of the University of North Carolina.

== Personal life ==
Kenan was a Presbyterian, serving as a treasurer of his church and becoming ordained as a deacon and a ruling elder.

In 1864, he married Mary Hargrave, of Chapel Hill. They had four children: William, Sarah, Mary, and Jessie.

== Death and legacy ==
He died in Wilmington on April 14, 1903 and was buried in Oakdale Cemetery.

The Kenan Professor Trust Fund at the University of North Carolina was established in his honor. Kenan Stadium, the football stadium at the university, was originally named in his honor but was renamed after his son, William Kenan Jr., in 2018 due to Kenan's involvement in the Wilmington massacre.
