= Thomas Kenan (Civil War) =

Civil War Lt. Col and politician

Thomas Stephen Kenan
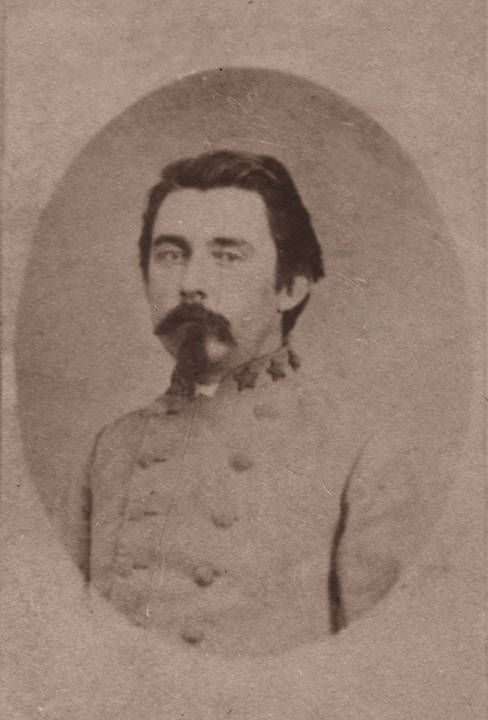
- Born: February 12, 1838
- Died: December 23, 1911 (aged 73)
- Alma mater: Wake Forest College; University of North Carolina
- Military career
- Allegiance: Confederate States of America
- Branch: Confederate States Army
- Service years: 1861–1865
- Rank: Colonel
- Unit: 43rd North Carolina Infantry Regiment
- Conflicts: American Civil War: Battle of Gettysburg
- Other work: Attorney General of North Carolina; Clerk of the North Carolina Supreme Court

Thomas Stephen Kenan (February 12, 1838 – December 23, 1911) was an American lawyer, Confederate soldier and politician. He served as the Attorney General of North Carolina in 1877–1885. He was a Democrat.

== Early life ==
Named after his grandfather U.S. congressman Thomas S. Kenan, his parents were Sarah Rebecca Graham and Owen Rand Kenan; he was the grandson of U.S. Congressman Thomas Kenan and great-grandson of Revolutionary War general James Kenan. He started his education in Duplin County at Old Grove Academy in Kenansville, North Carolina (the town was named for his great-grandfather in 1818). He spent a year at Central Military Institute in Selma, Alabama and started his freshman year at Wake Forest College in 1853-1854, but then transferred to the University of North Carolina, where he graduated in 1857. He read law for two years with Judge Pearson at Richmond Hill; he started to practiced law in Kenansville in 1860. In 1859 he helped to organize the Duplin Rifles, a militia unit, in Kenansville. In April 1861 he was elected as a captain of the Duplin Rifles

== Civil War ==
During the Civil War he served in the Confederate States Army. He was elected lieutenant colonel of the 43rd North Carolina Infantry Regiment in April 1862, and was promoted to colonel later that year. He was wounded on July 3, 1863 at the Battle of Gettysburg. While on an ambulance train, he and his older brother James Kenan were both captured; they were then imprisoned on Johnson's Island, Ohio. On March 22, 1865, he was released on parole. On his return home he was elected to the state legislature where he served from 1865 to 1867. Later that year he ran for the U.S. Congress and lost.

== Postbellum ==
Kenan moved to Wilson, North Carolina in 1869, where he was a mayor in 1872–1876, and then he was elected North Carolina Attorney General, serving from 1877 to 1885.

He was active in community and civic affairs of Wilson and the state. He served as the president of State Bar Association of North Carolina, was a member of the board of trustees of the University of North Carolina, among others.

== Family ==
In May 1868 he married Sarah "Sallie" Dortch, but they had no children.

Party political offices
Preceded by William Marcus Shipp	Democratic nominee for Attorney General of North Carolina; 1876, 1880	Succeeded by Theodore F. Davidson
