= Kenansville Historic District =

Historic district in North Carolina, United States

- U.S. National Register of Historic Places
- U.S. Historic district
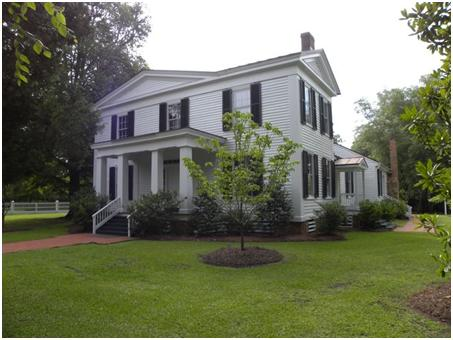
- Liberty Hall in 2011

- Location within North Carolina Location within the United States
- Location: Downtown area centered around Main St. and Limestone Rd. as far N as Hill St., Kenansville, North Carolina
- Coordinates: 35°57′38″N 77°57′47″W
- Area: 50 acres (20 ha)
- Built: c. 1818
- Architectural style: Greek Revival, Italianate, Federal
- NRHP reference No.: 75001256
- Added to NRHP: March 13, 1975

Kenansville Historic District is a national historic district located at Kenansville, Duplin County, North Carolina. The district encompasses 18 contributing buildings in Kenansville. It includes predominantly residential buildings with notable examples of Greek Revival, Federal, and Italianate style architecture. Notable buildings include the Brown-Jones House, Kelly-Farrier House, the Kenan House (Liberty Hall), the Pearsall House, the Graham House, the Isaac Kelly House, the Dr. David Gillespie House, the Grove Presbyterian Church, and the Kenansville Baptist Church.

It was added to the National Register of Historic Places in 1975.
