= James Sprunt Community College =

Public college in Kenansville, North Carolina, U.S.

Coordinates: 34.9469°N 77.9772°W

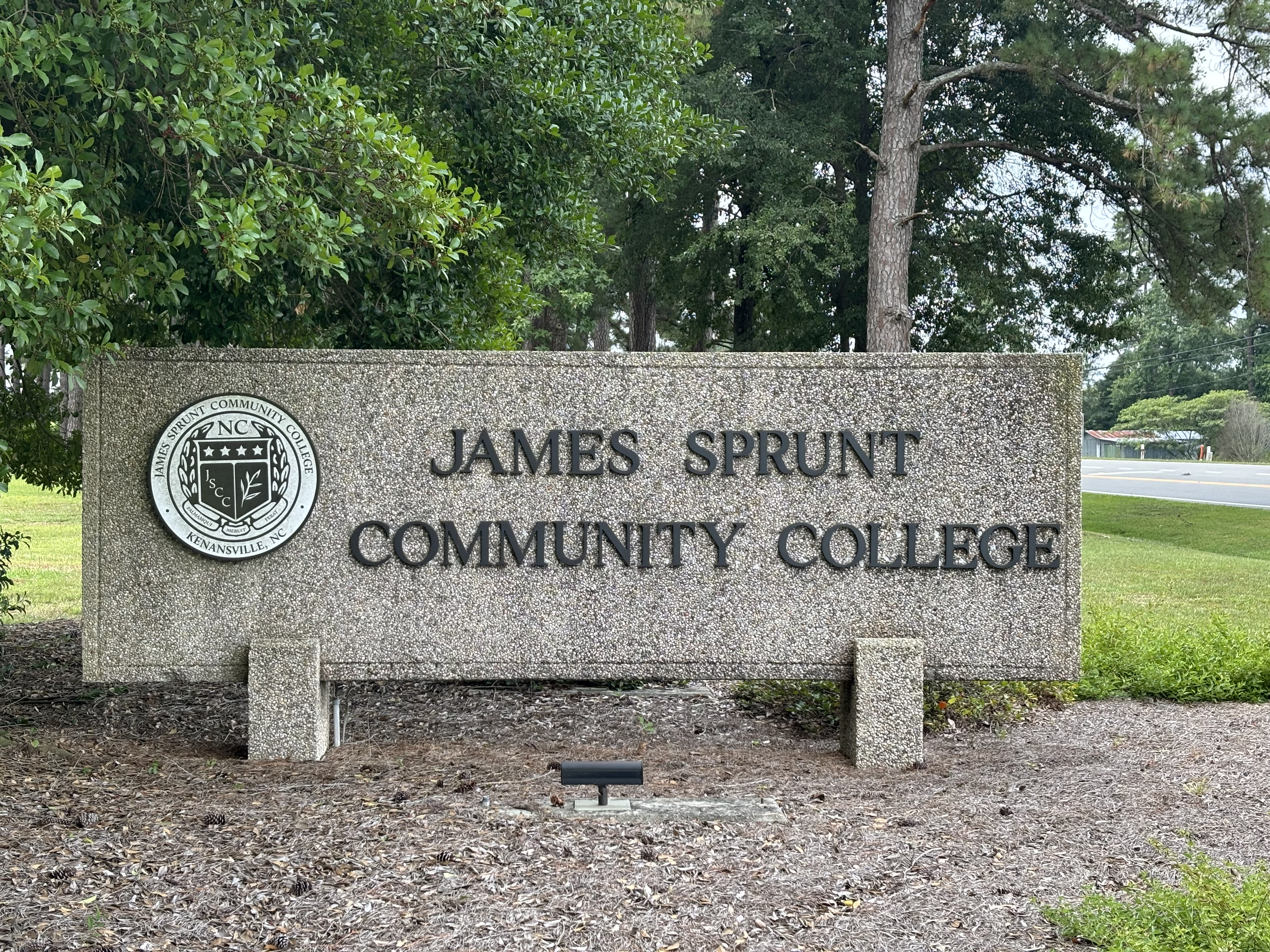
- James Sprunt Community College
- Type: Public community college
- Established: 1860
- Parent institution: North Carolina Community College System
- President: Jay Carraway
- Academic staff: 42 full-time faculty
- Students: 1,376 (fall 2023)
- Location: Kenansville, North Carolina, United States
- Campus: Rural
- Nickname: Spartans
- Website: jamessprunt.edu

James Sprunt Community College is a public community college in Kenansville, North Carolina. Founded in 1860 as James Sprunt Technical Institute, the college is named for James Menzies Sprunt (1818–1884), a Scottish immigrant who became a teacher, Presbyterian minister, and the longtime pastor of Grove Presbyterian Church in Kenansville. It is part of the North Carolina Community College System, and primarily serves Duplin County, North Carolina

== History ==
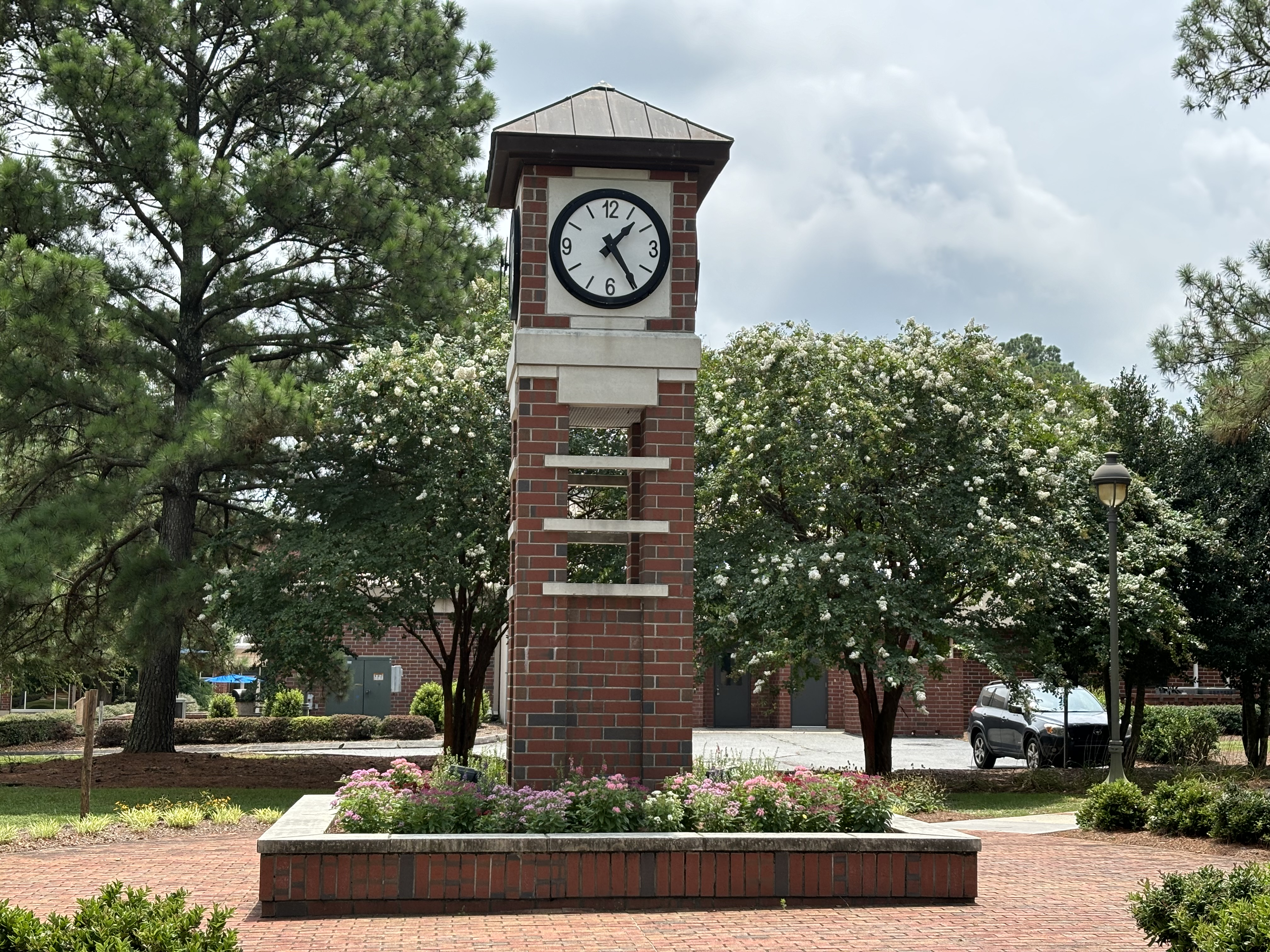
James Sprunt Clock Tower

James Sprunt became president of Grove Academy in 1840, a private academy for boys, which had opened in 1784. In 1860 he also assumed the presidency of Kenansville Seminary. The seminary would close down in 1896, 12 years after the death of Sprunt, but reopened as The James Sprunt Institute in 1960.

== Notable alumni ==
- Charles W. Albertson, politician
- Rachel Darden Davis, physician and politician
- William Rand Kenan, merchant
- James Smith, boxer
