= Cynan =

Cynan (also spelled Conan or Kenan) is a Welsh masculine given name. It may refer to:

- Cynan, the bardic name of Albert Evans-Jones (1895–1970), Welsh poet and dramatist
- Cynan ab Iago (11th century), prince of Gwynedd and father of Gruffydd ap Cynan
- Cynan ab Owain Gwynedd (fl. 1169–1174), Lord of Meirionnydd, illegitimate son of Owain Gwynedd
- Cynan ap Hywel (fl. 999–1005), Prince of Gwynedd
- Cynan ap Maredudd (fl. 1294–1295), Welsh nobleman
- Cynan Dindaethwy, king of Gwynedd
- Cynan Garwyn (fl. 6th century), king of Powys
- Cynan Jones (born 1975), Welsh writer
- Cynan Nant Nyfer (9th century), Welsh warrior
