= William R. Kenan Jr. =

American chemist, engineer and manufacturer (1872–1965)

- Born: April 30, 1872; Wilmington, North Carolina
- Died: July 28, 1965 (aged 93)
- Occupations: Chemist; engineer; manufacturer; dairy farmer; philanthropist
- Spouse: Alice Pomroy
- Parent(s): William Rand Kenan; Mary Hargrave
- Relatives: Sarah Graham Kenan (sister); Mary Lily Kenan Flagler Bingham (sister); Owen Rand Kenan (grandfather)

William Rand Kenan Jr. (April 30, 1872 – July 28, 1965) was an American chemist, engineer, manufacturer, dairy farmer, and philanthropist.

== Early life ==
William Rand Kenan Jr. was born in Wilmington, North Carolina, on April 30, 1872, son of William Rand Kenan (1845–1903) and Mary Hargrave. His father, who became a trustee of the University of North Carolina, was a Civil War veteran, customs collector, life insurance agent, and wholesale merchant. He was a brother of Sarah Graham Kenan and a grandson of Owen Rand Kenan. Kenan attended Horner Military Academy and graduated from the University of North Carolina at Chapel Hill in 1894 where was a member of Sigma Alpha Epsilon.

== Career ==
He started his career by establishing plants for acetylene production in the United States, Australia, and Germany. In 1896, he worked for Union Carbide (now a subsidiary of Dow Chemical Company) in Niagara Falls, New York.

Between 1899 and 1900, he helped develop Florida's east coast with oilman Henry Flagler. This included the construction of the Florida East Coast Railway and the Florida East Coast Hotel Company, including the Breakers Hotel in Palm Beach, Florida.

In 1901, Flagler married Kenan's sister Mary Lily. In 1904, William Kenan married Alice Pomroy, whom he had met at Flagler's home. After Flagler's death in 1913, Mary Lily and Flagler's surviving two sisters inherited his estate. In 1917, Mary Lily died and Kenan inherited most of Flagler's estate.

He moved to Lockport, New York, his wife Alice's hometown, and ran the Western Block Company, the largest maker of block and tackle in the United States. He maintained Randleigh Farm, a model dairy farm for research with Jersey cattle. He spent the rest of his life writing and donating resources to philanthropic endeavors.

In 1944, Kenan was awarded an honorary Doctor of Laws degree by the University of North Carolina.

== Death and legacy ==
Kenan died in 1965. In 1986, the Kenan Center was founded at the University of North Carolina at Chapel Hill. It houses the Kenan Institute for the Study of Private Enterprise as well as the William R. Kenan Jr. Charitable Trust and the William R. Kenan Jr. Fund. Moreover, he provided the funds for Kenan Memorial Stadium and it was named, at his request, in honor of his parents. When it was revealed that his father participated in the murder of innocent African Americans during the Wilmington massacre of 1898, the stadium was rededicated to William Kenan Jr. The Kenan–Flagler Business School at UNC is named for him and his sister, Mary Kenan Flagler. The Kenan Institute for Ethics at Duke University was founded in 1995. More than eighty-five endowed professorships at colleges and universities in the United States are named for him. One of the professors sponsored by the trust is controversial UNC virologist Ralph Baric.

Another Kenan Center is located in Lockport, New York. The Lockport area also benefited significantly from Kenan's philanthropy.

== Writings ==
- Kenan, William R. (1950). History of Randleigh Farm (9th ed.). Lockport, New York: (self-published).
- Kenan, William R. (1958). Incidents by the Way: More Recollections (5th ed.). (self-published).
