= Cynan Nant Nyfer =

9th-century Welsh warrior

Cynan Nant Nyfer ("Cynan of the Nevern Valley"; fl. 865) was a 9th-century Welsh warrior whose death was recorded by most of the surviving Welsh histories. He was credited with many victories against the Saxons. Among the variations of his name was Cynan Nawdd Nifer ("Cynan, Protection of Many").
