= Harry Harkness Flagler =

American philanthropist (1870–1952)

- Born: December 2, 1870; Cleveland, Ohio
- Died: June 30, 1952 (aged 81); Millbrook, New York
- Education: Columbia University
- Spouse: Anne Lamont (m. 1894; died 1938)
- Father: Henry Flagler

Harry Harkness Flagler (December 2, 1870 – June 30, 1952) was president of the Philharmonic Symphony Society of New York and the National Orchestral Association.

== Biography ==
He was born in Cleveland, Ohio, on December 2, 1870, to Henry Flagler, a founder of Standard Oil and Mary Harkness Flagler. He graduated from Columbia University in 1897.

He married Anne Lamont in 1894 and had a daughter, Mary Flagler Cary. He became president of the Philharmonic Symphony Society of New York in 1914. In 1928 the Symphony Society merged with the Philharmonic Society, and he became president of the combined New York Philharmonic until 1934, when he resigned because of his ill health. He was succeeded as president by Marshall Field III.

His wife died in 1938 after being ill for a year and a half.

He died on June 30, 1952 in Millbrook, New York.
