= Whitehall (Henry M. Flagler House) =

Historic house in Florida, United States

- U.S. National Register of Historic Places
- U.S. National Historic Landmark
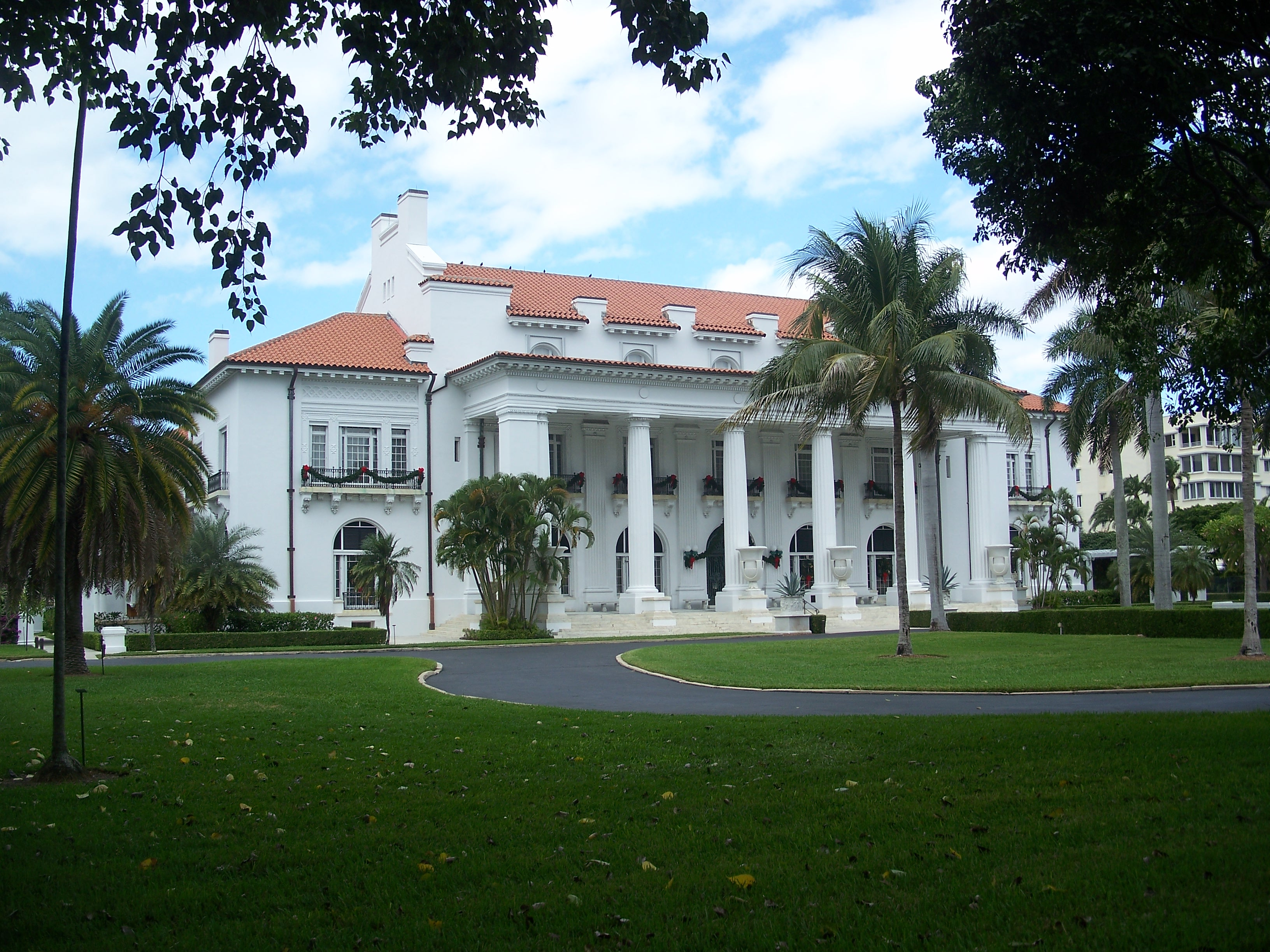
- Henry M. Flagler Mansion

- Location within Florida
- Location: Palm Beach, Florida, USA
- Coordinates: 26°42′51″N 80°2′30″W
- Built: 1900–1901
- Architect: Pottier & Stymus, Carrère and Hastings
- Architectural style: Beaux Arts
- NRHP reference No.: 72000345

Significant dates
- Added to NRHP: December 5, 1972
- Designated NHL: February 16, 2000

Whitehall is a 75-room, 60,000 square foot (5575 square meter) Gilded Age palace type mansion open to the public in Palm Beach, Florida in the United States. Completed in 1902, it is a major example of neoclassical Beaux Arts architecture designed by Carrère and Hastings for Henry Flagler, a leading captain of industry in the late 19th century, and a leading developer of Florida as a tourist destination. The building is listed a National Historic Landmark. It now houses the Henry Morrison Flagler Museum, named after its builder.

== History ==
Henry Flagler, one of the founders of Standard Oil, built Whitehall for his third wife, Mary Lily Kenan.

The site of the home was purchased for $50,000 in 1893 (equivalent to $1,792,000 in 2025) by Flagler. The site was later surveyed for construction in July 1900 and the home was completed in time for Flagler and his wife to move in on February 6, 1902. The architects were John Carrère and Thomas Hastings, who had earlier designed the Ponce de Leon Hotel and several other buildings in St. Augustine for Flagler. Whitehall was to be a winter residence, and Henry gave it to Mary Lily as a wedding present. They would travel to Palm Beach each year in one of their own private railcars, one of which was No. 91.

Flagler died of injuries sustained in falling down a flight of marble stairs at Whitehall in 1913, at the age of 83. Mary Lily died four years later, and the home was devised to her niece Louise Clisby Wise Lewis, who sold the property to investors. They constructed a 300-room, ten-story addition to the west side of the building, obliterating Mr. Flagler's offices and the housekeeper's apartment, and altering the original kitchen and pantry area. Carrere and Hastings were the architects of the 1925 reconstruction. In 1939 it was described as a $4,000,000 building and Palm Beach's second-largest hotel.

=== Museum ===
In 1959, the site was saved from demolition by one of Henry Flagler's granddaughters Jean Flagler Matthews. She established the Henry Morrison Flagler Museum non-profit corporation, which purchased the building in 1959, opening it as a museum in 1960. The upper ten stories of the hotel addition were demolished in 1963 in preparing the museum for the public.

Today, Whitehall is a National Historic Landmark and is open to the public as the Henry Morrison Flagler Museum, featuring guided tours, exhibits, and special programs. The museum offers several programs, many of which are seasonal, lasting only from October to January. In addition to an annual chamber music series, the Flagler hosts the Whitehall lecture series, which brings "experts and best-selling authors to discuss Gilded Age topics, events, and local history." Past lecture series include historical talks about the dawn of the Progressive Era, World War I, Gilded Age presidents, engineering feats, and Metaphysical America: Spirituality and Health Movements During the Gilded Age. The Flagler also holds a special exhibition each year, often showcasing Gilded Age paintings, sculptures, glamour photography, or material culture, such as board games, jewelry, cartoons, Tiffany & Co. silver pieces (including ones displayed at the 1893 Chicago World's Columbian Exposition), and women's fashion. It also hosts a variety of local galas and balls throughout the year. The Museum is located at Cocoanut Row and Whitehall Way in Palm Beach.

== Architecture ==
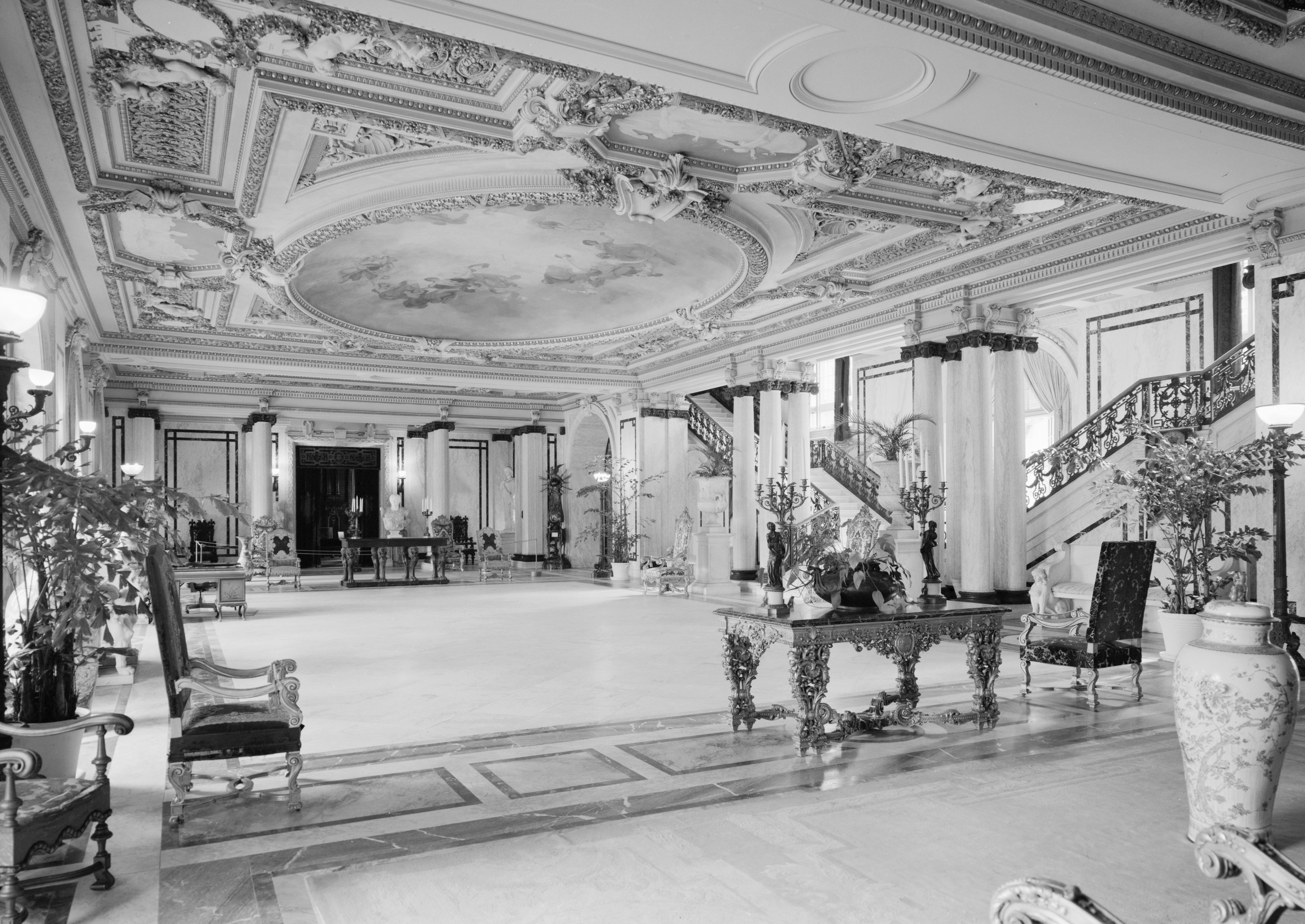
Interior of the Main Hall, 1972

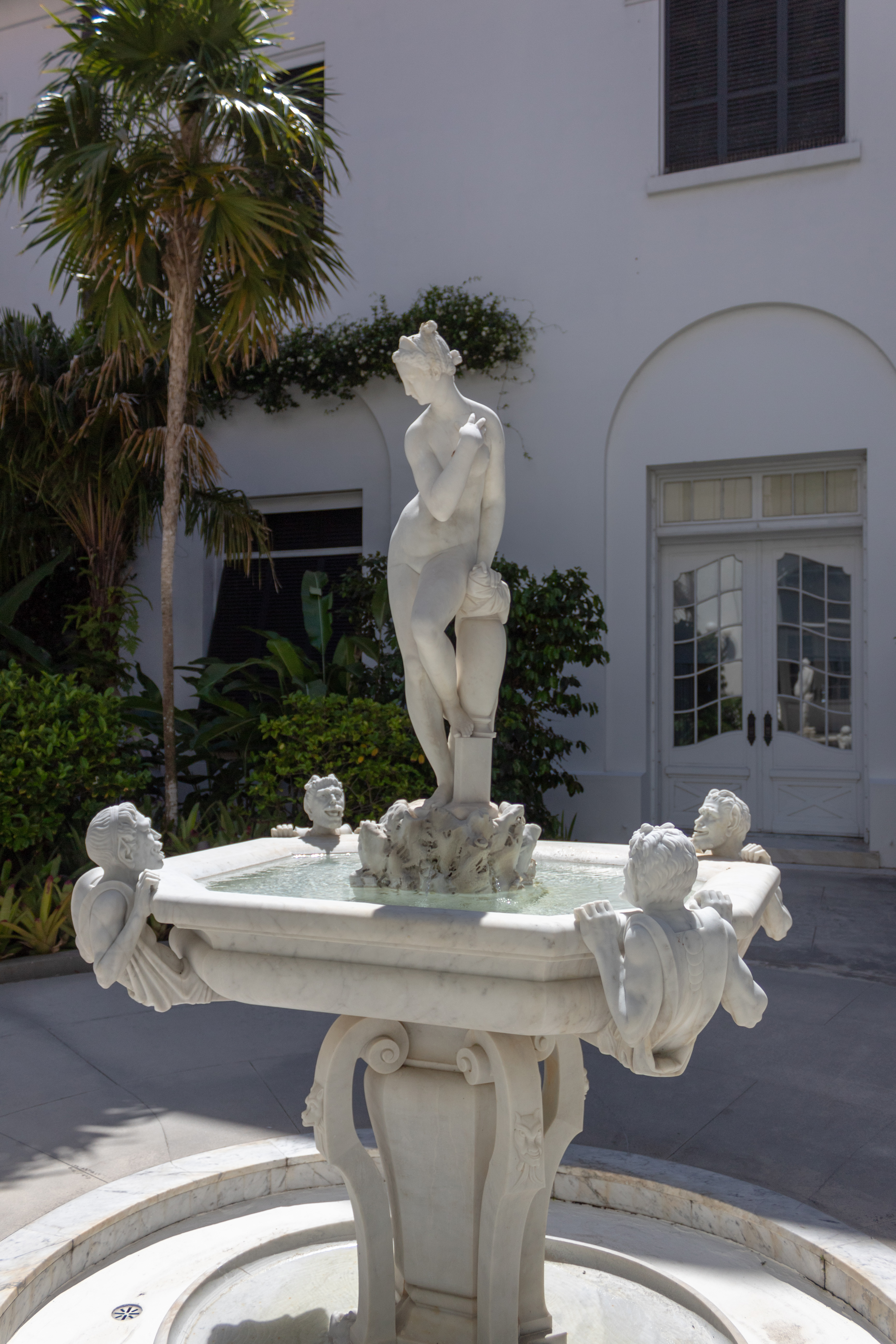
Fountain in the courtyard

When it was completed in 1902, Whitehall was hailed by the New York Herald as "more wonderful than any palace in Europe, grander and more magnificent than any other private dwelling in the world." It was designed in the Beaux Arts style, meant to rival the extravagant mansions in Newport, Rhode Island.

Distinct from these northern homes, Whitehall had no outbuildings or subsidiary structures. Nor had it elaborately planned or cultivated gardens. Plants, flowers, trees and shrubs were allowed to grow unaided.

The mansion is built around a large open-air central courtyard and is modeled after palaces in Spain and Italy. Three stories tall with several wings, the mansion has fifty-five fully restored rooms furnished with period pieces. These rooms are large with marble floors, walls and columns, murals on the ceilings, and heavy gilding.

=== Flagler Kenan Pavilion ===
Officially opened February 4, 2005, the $4.5-million Flagler Kenan Pavilion is the first addition to the property since 1925. The 8,100-square-foot (750 m^{2}) pavilion is named after the mogul and William R. Kenan Jr., Flagler's engineer, friend and brother-in-law. It was designed in the Beaux-Arts manner by Jeffery W. Smith of Palm Beach-based Smith Architectural Group, Inc. and took almost four years to build. The featured display in this pavilion is Railcar No. 91, Flagler's private railcar built in Delaware in 1886. According to the museum, the car was restored using "documentation from the National Museum of American History, the Smithsonian, the Delaware State Archives, and the Hagley Museum and Library in Delaware." It also houses the seasonal Pavilion Café and tea service.

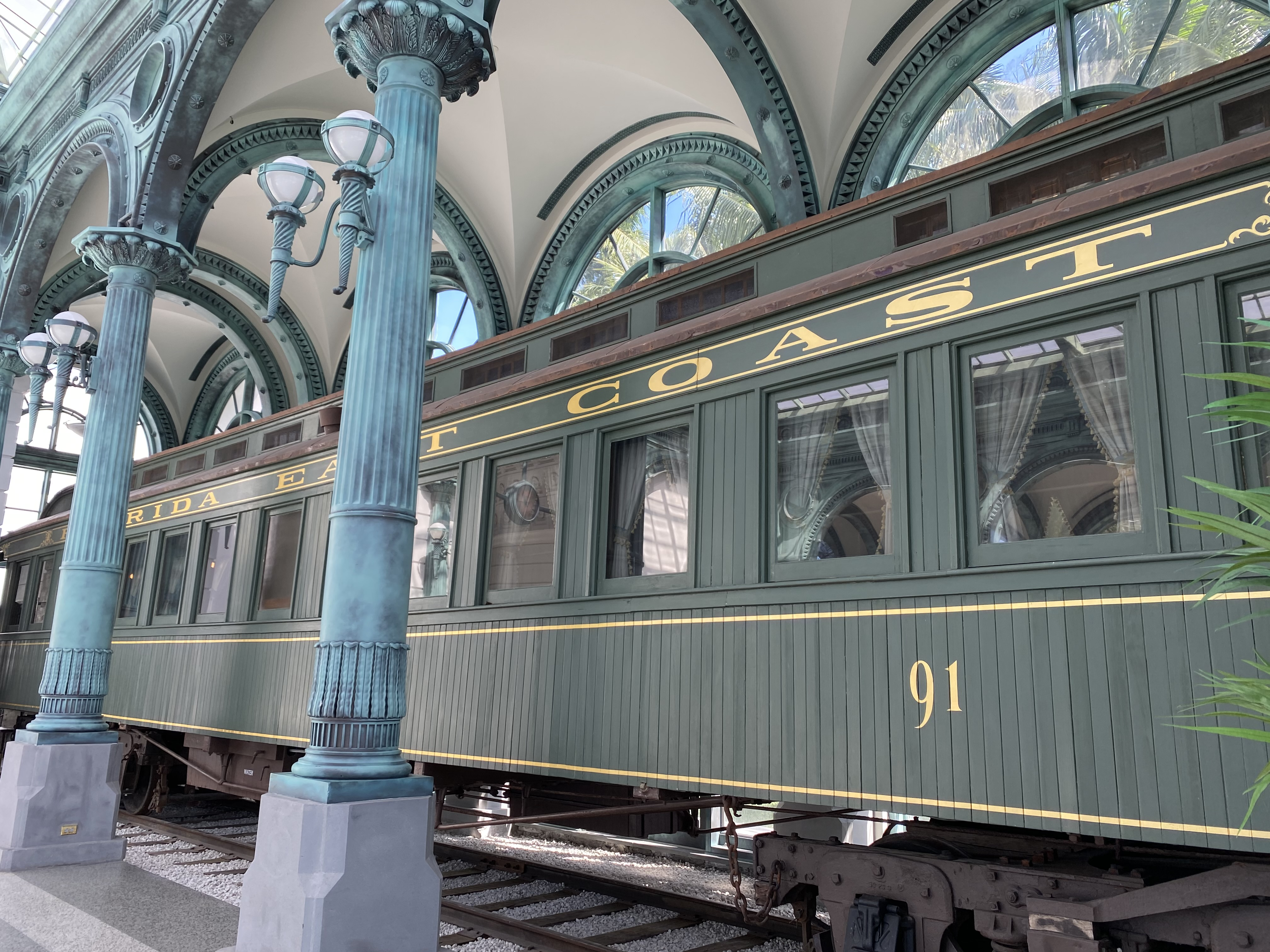
Exterior of Railcar No. 91 inside the Flagler Kenan Pavilion at the Henry Morrison Flagler Museum, 2021

== See also ==
- List of largest houses in the United States
- List of Gilded Age mansions
- List of National Historic Landmarks in Florida
- National Register of Historic Places listings in Palm Beach County, Florida
