= Market Street Mansion District =

Historic house in North Carolina, United States

- U.S. National Register of Historic Places
- U.S. Historic district
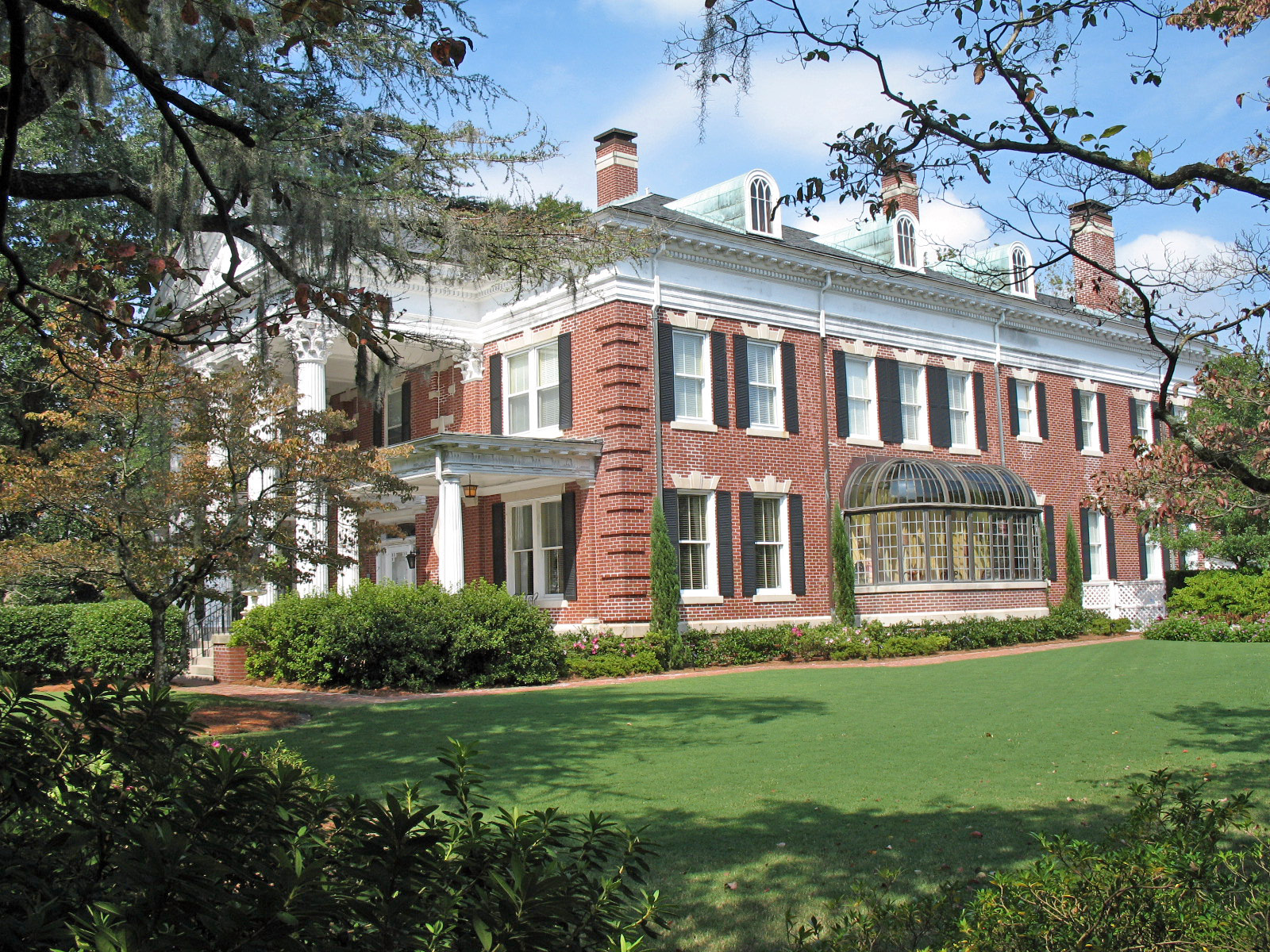
- Bridgers-Emerson-Kenan Mansion, September 2009

- Location within North Carolina Location within the United States
- Location: 1704, 1705, 1710, 1713 Market St., Wilmington, North Carolina
- Coordinates: 34°14′12″N 77°55′38″W
- Area: 10 acres (4.0 ha)
- Built: 1908-1917
- Architect: Stephens, Burett H.
- Architectural style: Classical Revival, Georgian Revival
- NRHP reference No.: 75001284
- Added to NRHP: April 21, 1975

Market Street Mansion District is a national historic district located at Wilmington, New Hanover County, North Carolina. The district encompasses four large impressive early-20th century dwellings set on large lots. They are the Georgian Revival style Bridgers-Emerson-Kenan Mansion (1907-1908), the Classical Revival style Holt-Wise Mansion (1908), Classical Revival style Bridgers-Brooks Mansion (1909-1911), and the Georgian Revival style Bluethenhal House (1917).

It was listed on the National Register of Historic Places in 1975.
