= Kenan (name) =

Name list

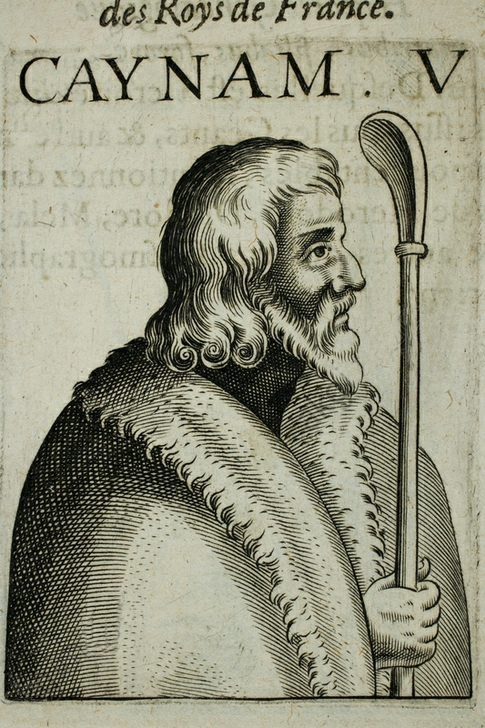
- Kenan as depicted in Jacques de Charron's Histoire universelle (1630)
- Gender: Male

Other names
- Related names: Cainan

Kenan is a male given name. The name refers to the Abrahamic patriarch Kenan and to the region of Canaan. In the Balkans, Kenan is used among Bosniaks in the former Yugoslav nations. The name is also used in Turkey. Notable persons with the given name include:

- Kenan Yıldız (born 2005), Turkish footballer
- Kenan Babaoğlu (born 1982), Turkish para-archer
- Kenan Doğulu (born 1974), Turkish singer
- Kenan Evren (1917–2015), Turkish president
- Kenan Erim (1929–1990), Turkish archaeologist
- Kenan Halilović, Bosnian artist of Witch Creek Road (2017–2021) and Witch Creek High (2023; on hiatus)
- Kenan Horić (born 1990), Bosnian footballer
- Kenan İmirzalıoğlu (born 1974), Turkish actor
- Kenan Kodro (born 1993), Spanish footballer of Bosnian descent
- Kənan Kərimov (born 1976), Azerbaijani footballer
- Kenan Özer (born 1987), Turkish Cypriot footballer
- Kenan Şahin (born 1984), German footballer of Turkish descent
- Kenan Şimşek (born 1968), Turkish Olympian wrestler
- Kenan Sipahi (born 1995), Turkish basketball player
- Kenan Sofuoğlu (born 1983), Turkish motorcycle racer
- Kenan Thompson (born 1978), American actor and comedian
- Kenan Yaghi (born 1976), Syrian politician
- Kenan Çoban (born 1975), Turkish actor

== See also ==
- Kenan (disambiguation)
- Kenan (surname)
