= Kenansville, North Carolina =

Town in North Carolina, United States

- Town
- Town of Kenansville
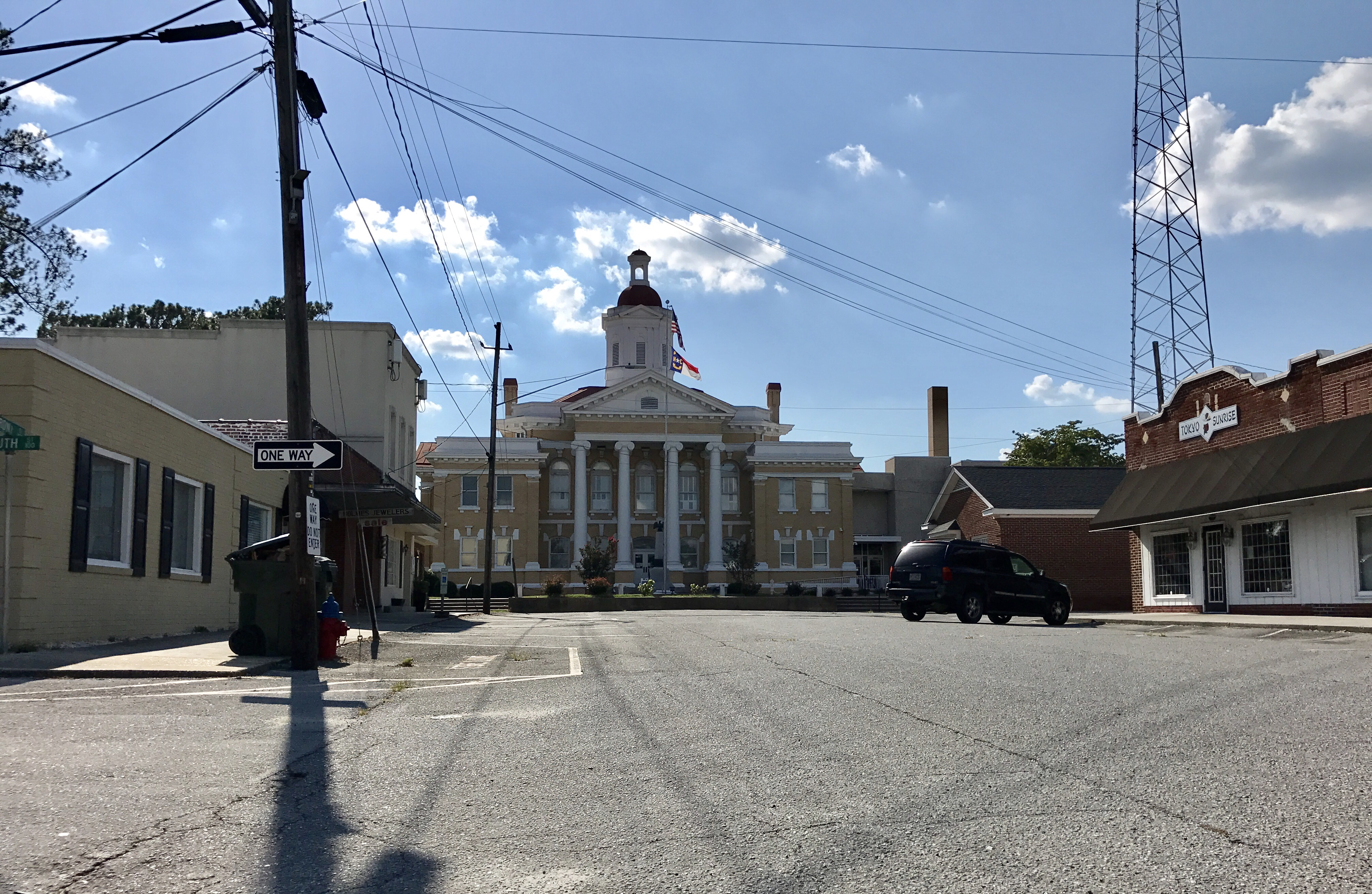
- Courthouse Square

- Seal

- Location within the state of North Carolina Kenansville (the United States)
- Coordinates: 34°57′35″N 77°57′58″W
- Country: United States
- State: North Carolina
- County: Duplin
- Incorporated: December 27, 1852
- Named for: James Kenan

Area
  - Total: 2.12 sq mi (5.48 km^{2})
  - Land: 2.12 sq mi (5.48 km^{2})
  - Water: 0 sq mi (0.00 km^{2})
- Elevation: 131 ft (40 m)

Population (2020)
  - Total: 770
  - Density: 363.9/sq mi (140.51/km^{2})
- Time zone: UTC-5 (Eastern (EST))
  - Summer (DST): UTC-4 (EDT)
- ZIP code: 28349
- Area codes: 910, 472
- FIPS code: 37-35460
- GNIS feature ID: 2405934
- Website: kenansville.org

Kenansville is a town in Duplin County, North Carolina, United States. Its population was 770 at the 2020 census. It is the county seat of Duplin County. The town was named for James Kenan, a member of the North Carolina Senate. Liberty Hall, his early 1800s era historic home, is located within Kenansville.

== History ==
The Needham Whitfield Herring House and Kenansville Historic District are listed on the National Register of Historic Places.

== Geography ==
Kenansville is located slightly west of the center of Duplin County. North Carolina Highways 11 and 50 pass through the center of town, while North Carolina Highway 24 bypasses the town as a four-lane highway to the southeast. NC 24 leads southwest 5 miles (8 km) to Interstate 40 at Exit 373 and east 38 miles (61 km) to Jacksonville. NC 11 leads northeast 33 miles (53 km) to Kinston and south 18 miles (29 km) to Wallace, while NC 50 leads southeast 46 miles (74 km) to Holly Ridge and west 8 miles (13 km) to Warsaw.

According to the United States Census Bureau, Kenansville has a total area of 2.1 square miles (5.5 km^{2}), all land.

== Demographics ==
Historical population
Census	Pop.	Note	%±
1880	376		—
1890	291		−22.6%
1900	271		−6.9%
1910	270		−0.4%
1920	302		11.9%
1930	450		49.0%
1940	571		26.9%
1950	674		18.0%
1960	724		7.4%
1970	762		5.2%
1980	931		22.2%
1990	856		−8.1%
2000	1,149		34.2%
2010	855		−25.6%
2020	770		−9.9%
U.S. Decennial Census

=== 2020 census ===
Kenansville racial composition
Race	Number	Percentage
White (non-Hispanic)	442	57.4%
Black or African American (non-Hispanic)	249	32.34%
Native American	1	0.13%
Asian	3	0.39%
Other/Mixed	48	6.23%
Hispanic or Latino	27	3.51%

As of the 2020 United States census, there were 770 people, 411 households, and 236 families residing in the town.

According to the 2023 American Community Survey (ACS) 5-Year Estimates released by the U.S. Census Bureau, the median age was approximately 43 years. The estimated age distribution across age groups is as follows: 31.3% under 18, 5.0% from 18 to 24, 19.5% from 25 to 44, 22.5% from 45 to 64, and 21.8% were 65 or older. For every 100 females, there were 80.5 males.

The median household income was estimated at $62,917, and the median income for a family was $73,958, with 22.7% of the population living below the poverty line, including 23.9% of those under age 18 and 16.6% of those age 65 or over.

=== 2000 census ===
As of the census of 2000, there were 1,149 people, 281 households, and 180 families residing in the town. The population density was 609.5 inhabitants per square mile (235.3/km^{2}). There were 314 housing units at an average density of 166.6 per square mile (64.3/km^{2}). The racial makeup of the town was 51.35% White, 45.95% African American, 0.26% Native American, 0.44% Asian, 1.83% from other races, and 0.17% from two or more races. Hispanic or Latino of any race were 2.70% of the population.

There were 281 households, out of which 22.4% had children under the age of 18 living with them, 50.2% were married couples living together, 10.7% had a female householder with no husband present, and 35.6% were non-families. 32.7% of all households were made up of individuals, and 17.4% had someone living alone who was 65 years of age or older. The average household size was 2.25 and the average family size was 2.83.

In the town, the population was spread out, with 11.8% under the age of 18, 8.2% from 18 to 24, 35.7% from 25 to 44, 21.3% from 45 to 64, and 23.0% who were 65 years of age or older. The median age was 42 years. For every 100 females, there were 167.2 males. For every 100 females age 18 and over, there were 167.3 males.

The median income for a household in the town was $36,053, and the median income for a family was $41,307. Males had a median income of $27,917 versus $23,021 for females. The per capita income for the town was $11,933. About 11.9% of families and 28.5% of the population were below the poverty line, including 11.3% of those under age 18 and 56.9% of those age 65 or over.

== Cultural resources ==
The Cowan Museum has artifacts from the early rural heritage of North Carolina and Duplin County. Also located in Kenansville is Liberty Hall, the early 1800s era historic home of James Kenan, after whom the town was named.

== Notable residents ==
- William Reynolds Allen, judge
- Michael English, singer
- Charles Hooks, politician
- Mary Lily Kenan Flagler Bingham, heiress and philanthropist
- James Kenan, militia officer and politician
- Owen Rand Kenan, planter and politician
- Thomas Kenan, Attorney General of North Carolina
- Thomas S. Kenan, planter
- William Rand Kenan, merchant
- Greg Peterson, football player
- Ruth Faison Shaw, artist
