= Thomas S. Kenan =

American politician

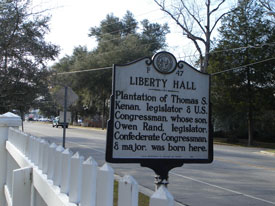
Liberty Hall marker outside of Liberty hall Restoration

Thomas Stephen Kenan (February 26, 1771 – October 22, 1843) was the son of Revolutionary War General James Kenan, a plantation owner and builder of the first "Liberty Hall". He was a U.S. Congressman from North Carolina between 1805 and 1811.

Born in Kenansville, North Carolina, Kenan was educated by private tutors at home. He married Mary Rand Kenan on January 3, 1800, and soon after the second Liberty Hall was built located in Kenansville after his father's home had been lost to fire.

Kenan was a member of the North Carolina House of Commons representing Duplin County from 1798 to 1799. Between 1799 and 1803 he served in the North Carolina Senate in 1804. In 1804, Kenan was elected to the 9th United States Congress and was reelected to terms in the 10th and 11th Congresses (March 4, 1805 – March 3, 1811). He did not stand for reelection in 1810.

He and Mary Rand had ten children and in March 1811 Thomas decided to move the family to Selma, Alabama, to start a new plantation. Thomas left behind his oldest son Owen Rand Kenan to look after the Liberty Hall Plantation and start his own family. While in Alabama, Thomas served as an Alabama State Representative.

Kenan later moved to Selma, Alabama in 1833, where he engaged in planting; he served in the Alabama House of Representatives for several years before dying near Selma in 1843, aged 72. He is buried in Selma's Valley Creek Cemetery.

He died in October 1843. He and his wife are buried at Valley Creek Cemetery near Selma.

U.S. House of Representatives
Preceded by James Gillespie	Member of the U.S. House of Representatives from North Carolina's 5th congressional district 1805–1811	Succeeded by William R. King
