= Mary Lily Kenan Flagler Bingham =

American philanthropist (1867–1917)

- Born: June 14, 1867
- Died: 1917 (aged 49–50)
- Spouses: Henry Flagler (m. 1901; died 1913); Robert Worth Bingham (m. 1916)
- Parent(s): William Rand Kenan Sr. Mary Hargrave

Mary Lily Kenan Flagler Bingham (1867–1917) was an American philanthropist and heiress. She married Henry Flagler, one of the richest men of the Gilded Age. She outlived him, inheriting his fortune, and married again three years later, before dying under suspicious circumstances at age fifty. She left the millions she inherited to members of her family and to the University of North Carolina at Chapel Hill.

== Childhood ==
Kenan grew up in an affluent family in North Carolina. She was the daughter of William Rand Kenan Sr. and Mary Hargrave Kenan, Mary Lily was born in Duplin County, on June 14, 1867. She was the sister of Sarah Graham Kenan and William R. Kenan Jr. When she was little, her father was a life insurance agent. By the late 1870s, her family lived in Wilmington, North Carolina Mary Lily attended Amy Bradley's Tileston school in Wilmington. Mary Lily was well-educated for a woman in the late 19th century: she both attended school in Wilmington, and attended Peace College in Raleigh. Kenan was also well known for her musical abilities and according to one account, she was North Carolina's "reigning belle" because of her vivaciousness, beauty, and accomplishments. By this time, Mary Lily had become well acquainted with some of the richest members of Wilmington society. She traveled with the Mr. and Mrs. Pembroke Jones and became socially intimate with the Jones' friend, Henry Walters, as well as Mr. and Mrs. Henry Flagler.

== Marriages ==
Mary Lily Kenan married the much-older Henry Morrison Flagler in 1901 at Liberty Hall, the Kenan family's plantation. She was his third wife. Henry Morrison Flagler was 72 years old and she was 34, but it wasn't only the age gap that scandalized the nation. In order to marry Mary Lily, Flagler had to obtain a divorce from his second wife, who had become mentally ill over the course of their marriage. At that time, one had to cite certain specific reasons for divorce, as no-fault divorce did not yet exist. Henry changed his legal residence to Florida, and persuaded the Florida legislature to allow divorce on the grounds of insanity. He was criticized for this action, partly due to societal attitudes toward Divorce in the United States, and partly because of her mental state. According to the Goldsboro Argus, "a Man who would thus cast off an aged wife, blameless herself, is simply beyond execration."

When the couple married in 1901 in Duplin County, Flagler gave Mary Lily Kenan "a check for $1,000,000, and $3,000,000 in bonds as a wedding present." After their marriage, Henry lavished gifts and attention on Mary Lily. Henry built Whitehall, a "75-room, 100,000-square-foot Gilded Age mansion...as a wedding present for his wife, Mary Lily Kenan Flagler. The couple used the home as a winter retreat from 1902 until Flagler's death in 1913, establishing the Palm Beach season for the wealthy of the Gilded Age."

Henry Flagler died in 1913, and passed the majority of his wealth on to Mary Lily. Three years later, Mary Lily married a college friend of her brother's, whom she had dated previously in the 1890s. She and Judge Robert Worth Bingham married in New York City, at the home of Mr. and Mrs. Pembroke Jones in 1916. This second marriage did not last long. Mary Lily Kenan Flagler Bingham died in July 1917.

== Death ==
Mary Lily Kenan Bingham's death also sparked scandal and controversy. Mary Lily died after a short illness, and, according to the Wilmington Morning Star, "...the news of her death produced a profound shock in the family and among many friends in the city and in other cities of the State..." Mary Lily was buried on July 31, 1917, after a service in the residence of Mary Lily's sister Sarah. The shock of Mary Lily's death seems to have quickly turned to suspicion about how she died. Headlines spoke of a "tragic mystery," "foul play" and "murder" and seemed to imply that Mary Lily's husband may have had something to do with her death. Before they married, Judge Bingham waived his rights to the Flagler fortune and most of the estate was left to Mary Lily's birth family members. Judge Bingham did receive $5 million, and some of the concerns about him seem to have stemmed from this inheritance, which was a late addition to Mary Lily's will.

Rather than remaining at rest in Oakdale Cemetery, Mary Lily Kenan Flagler Bingham's body was exhumed in September 1917, with armed guards stationed around the gravesite as her body was dug up in the night. The autopsy was requested by Graham Kenan, Mary Lily's sister Sarah's husband, not Robert Bingham. Despite these irregularities and mysterious circumstances, no charges were ever levied against anyone in the matter of Mrs. Bingham's death. Bingham went on to be an ambassador to England in the 1930s, and parlayed Mary Lily's money into a newspaper empire. The results of the autopsy were never released. Rumors of syphilis, drug use, alcoholism, and murder have swirled around the life of Mary Lily Kenan Flagler Bingham ever since.

The estate left was vast – "...estimated to be worth all the way from $65,000,000 to $130,000,000."

== Legacy ==
Mary Lily Kenan's marriage to Henry Flagler significantly increased the wealth and prominence of the Kenan family. Beneficiaries of her estate included her brother William R. Kenan Jr., her sisters Jessie Kenan Wise and Sarah Graham Kenan, her niece Louise Wise, and the University of North Carolina at Chapel Hill. One of her best-known contributions to the university was the establishment of the Kenan Professorship Fund, created in memory of her father and two uncles, all alumni of the university. Following Mary Lily Kenan's death, further donations to the university were later made by members of the Kenan family, including William R. Kenan Jr. and Sarah Graham Kenan.
