= Liberty Hall (Kenansville, North Carolina) =

Historic house museum in North Carolina, United States

Coordinates: 34.9599°N 77.9652°W

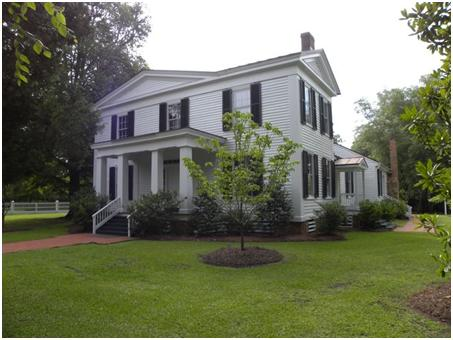

General information
- Type: plantation house
- Location: Kenansville, North Carolina, U.S.

Liberty Hall is a historic house museum in Kenansville, North Carolina. Built in the early 1800s, it was the home of North Carolina state senator and militia general James Kenan for whom the town is named. Kenan commanded local militia during the American Revolutionary War.

== History ==
=== Background ===
The first Liberty Hall was built by Thomas Kenan in the late 1730s. This home was located on what was then called Turkey Branch Plantation near the present town of Turkey, North Carolina. Thomas Kenan was the first Kenan to emigrate to the United States, sailing from Ireland in 1736 and arriving in Wilmington, North Carolina that same year. Thomas Kenan lived on this plantation until his death in 1766. His wife Elizabeth Johnson Kenan continued to live in the old place until her death in 1789 at which time it passed to their son Gen. James Kenan who named the home Liberty Hall due to the many political meetings and gatherings that took place during this in American history. This first Liberty Hall was furnished with many pieces brought over from Europe and also contained several American pieces in particular a few choice North Carolina pieces. This home burned to the ground prior to 1800; however, several furnishings were saved.

=== 19th century ===
In the late 18th century, Thomas S. Kenan built the present Liberty Hall in Kenansville. In 1833 he and his wife, Mary Rand of Raleigh and their two youngest children moved to Selma, Alabama where he died in 1860. Owen Rand Kenan; Thomas and Mary Rand's oldest son stayed behind and have his own plantation and family. Owen Rand married Sarah Rebecca Graham and made Liberty Hall their home. They did make a few structural changes including adding two porches and attaching the Kitchen to the house. Owen Rand and Sarah had four children, Thomas S Kenan, James Graham Kenan, William Rand Kenan, and Annie D. Kenan. All the children were well educated and enjoyed playing music. There were constant visitors and guests at Liberty Hall, and the motto that became associated with the house once hung as a needle point in the hallway "he who enters these open gates never comes too early or leaves too late".

According to Thomas Kenan of Chapel Hill, an eighth-generation descendant of the original settler, income from the Liberty Hall plantation was primarily from sales of timber, pinch tar, and turpentine. 20 to 50 enslaved laborers worked on the plantation.

During the American Civil War, Liberty Hall escaped harm during the war though Union troops were at times in the immediate area. Owen Rand Kenan's three sons also survived the war, came home, married and moved away. Owen died in 1887, and Liberty hall was left to his unmarried daughter Annie D. Kenan, who also lived out her life at Liberty Hall.

=== 20th century ===
In August 1901, Liberty Hall hosted the wedding of Annie's niece Mary Lilly Kenan and the "Father of Miami", Henry Flagler. Flagler was one of the richest men in America at that time, whose notable achievements included founding Standard Oil Company with John D. Rockefeller and putting the railroad through Florida. The wedding attracted international attention and well known people from various parts of the country attended. Mary Lilly's father had grown up in Liberty Hall and Mary Lilly herself had spent many summers in the home and cherished it for the many memories she had made there. One of Flagler's wedding gifts to Mary Lilly was a white marble mansion in Palm Beach, Florida called Whitehall, which is open to the public as a museum.

In April 1906, Annie Kenan died, the old home was boarded and closed up along with all its history and treasured family collections. Annie left Liberty Hall to her niece Mary Lilly. At Mary Lily's death she left the house to her nephew Owen Hill Kenan, a survivor of the 1915 sinking of the RMS Lusitania. The Kenan family had always cherished their ancestral home. However it was not until Owen Hill's death Frank H Kenan took the home and surrounding land and deeded to the board of Education in hopes the home would one day be a museum.

In 1965 the liberty Hall Restoration Commission was formed. Liberty Hall was structurally sound and full of priceless family heirlooms but needed much work done before it could be opened to the public. In 1968 Liberty Hall was opened to the public it was decided to decorate the house in a federal style (Civil War). Tom Kenan is the Current Head of the Restoration Committee and oversees all things associated with Liberty Hall. He also oversees several family trusts that pay for all of the upkeep and staff at Liberty Hall.

== Public access ==
Liberty Hall is open to the public; the fee for admission is $5 ($2.50 for children under 6) or $10 for the candlelight tour.

== See also ==
- List of museums in North Carolina
- List of plantations in the United States
