= Owen Rand Kenan =

American politician

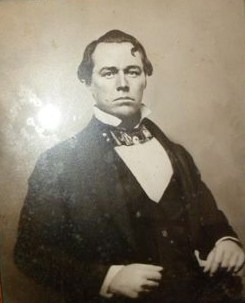

Member of the 1st Confederate States Congress
- In office 1862–1864

Member of the North Carolina House of Commons
- In office 1834–1838

Personal details
- Born: March 4, 1804 Kenansville, North Carolina, U.S.
- Died: March 3, 1887 (aged 82)
- Party: Democratic
- Spouse: Sarah Rebecca Graham
- Children: 4 (including William Rand Kenan)
- Parent: Thomas S. Kenan (father)
- Occupation: planter, politician

Owen Rand Kenan (March 4, 1804 – March 3, 1887) was a North Carolina politician. He was born in Kenansville, North Carolina in Duplin County, and served in the North Carolina House of Commons from 1834 to 1838. He also represented the state during the Civil War in the First Confederate Congress from 1862 to 1864. He grew up in Kenansville and took over his father Thomas S Kenan’s Plantation Liberty Hall, which became a hot spot for gala affairs. He married Sarah Rebecca Graham, the daughter of a physician. Owen Rand Kenan was a successful and prosperous planter; he and Sarah had four children, three sons that served in the Civil War and a daughter Annie. His wife Sarah died in 1871 and Owen died in March 1887; both he and Sarah's grave stones are located at the present day Liberty Hall Restoration. At Owen's death his unmarried daughter Annie Kenan became Mistress of Liberty Hall.
