= National Register of Historic Places listings in Duplin County, North Carolina =

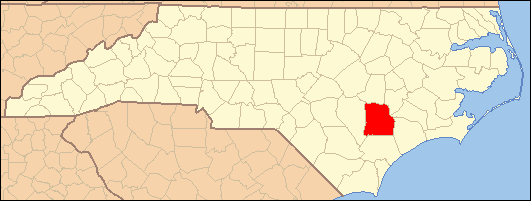

This list includes properties and districts listed on the National Register of Historic Places in Duplin County, North Carolina. Click the "Map of all coordinates" link to the right to view an online map of all properties and districts with latitude and longitude coordinates in the table below.

== Current listings ==
This National Park Service list is complete through NPS recent listings posted July 17, 2026.

	Name on the Register	Image	Date listed	Location	City or town	Description
1	Joshua James Blanchard House	Joshua James Blanchard House	August 28, 2012 (#12000572)	415 Carrolls Rd. 34°58′31″N 78°09′03″W	Warsaw	
2	Boney's Gristmill and Dam		July 28, 2026 (#100013054)	717 E. Southerland Street; 34°44′25″N 77°58′52″W	Wallace	
3	W. Stokes Boney House		July 8, 1999 (#99000812)	651 E. Southerland St. 34°44′31″N 77°59′09″W	Wallace	
4	Carter-Simmons House	Carter-Simmons House	April 15, 2015 (#15000162)	218 Coy Smith Rd. 35°05′48″N 77°48′27″W	Albertson	
5	Roger Dickson Farm		February 8, 1988 (#88000053)	E side of SR 1917; 34°51′42″N 78°00′28″W	Magnolia	
6	Faison Cemetery	Faison Cemetery	April 19, 2006 (#06000291)	East Main St. (NC 403); 35°06′59″N 78°07′54″W	Faison	
7	Faison Historic District	Faison Historic District	January 2, 1997 (#96001550)	Roughly bounded by College, Hill, Solomon, and Ellis Sts. 35°07′00″N 78°08′16″W	Faison	
8	William Wright Faison House		December 23, 2004 (#04001390)	NC 1304, 0.2 miles (0.32 km) southeast of the junction with NC 1354; 35°04′51″N 78°03′35″W	Bowdens	
9	B. F. Grady School		February 24, 1994 (#94000085)	North side NC 11, 0.3 miles (0.48 km) west of the junction with NC 111; 35°03′20″N 77°49′54″W	Kornegay	Destroyed April 1996
10	Hebron Presbyterian Church		February 24, 1995 (#95000144)	NC 1551 northwest side, 0.15 miles (0.24 km) northeast of the junction with NC 1554; 35°03′44″N 77°46′57″W	Pink Hill	
11	Bryan Whitfield Herring Farm		November 29, 2001 (#01001315)	NC 1311, 1 mile (1.6 km) east of the junction with NC 1302; 35°09′57″N 78°07′37″W	Calypso	
12	Needham Whitfield Herring House		May 26, 1994 (#94000529)	201 NC 24-50; 34°57′28″N 77°58′51″W	Kenansville	
13	Buckner Hill House		December 6, 1975 (#75001255)	Southeast of Faison on SR 1354; 35°05′00″N 78°05′13″W	Faison	
14	Kenansville Historic District	Kenansville Historic District	March 13, 1975 (#75001256)	Downtown area centered around Main St. and Limestone Rd. as far N as Hill St. 34°57′38″N 77°57′47″W	Kenansville	
15	Loftin Farm		December 31, 2001 (#01001426)	NC 1368, 0.65 miles (1.05 km) south of the junction with NC 1367; 35°09′15″N 78°01′28″W	Beautancus	
16	John Wesley Mallard House	John Wesley Mallard House	December 23, 2004 (#04001391)	NC 1301, 0.25 miles (0.40 km) south of NC 1329; 35°06′36″N 78°08′56″W	Faison	
17	Isaac M. Powers House		April 15, 1999 (#99000461)	NC 1154, 0.8 miles (1.3 km) south of the junction of NC 1154 and NC 4; 34°44′01″N 78°02′01″W	Wallace	
18	Wallace Commercial Historic District		October 20, 1995 (#95001179)	Roughly bounded by Southerland, College, Boney and Raleigh Sts. 34°44′08″N 77°59′35″W	Wallace	
19	Warsaw Historic District	Warsaw Historic District	December 13, 1996 (#96001484)	Roughly bounded by former Atlantic Coastline RR right-of-way, N. and S. Front, Pollock, Frisco, Plank, and Railroad Sts. 34°59′58″N 78°05′37″W	Warsaw	
20	Waterloo		January 8, 1975 (#75001254)	2 miles (3.2 km) south of Albertson on NC 111; 35°05′12″N 77°48′55″W	Albertson	

== See also ==
- National Register of Historic Places listings in North Carolina
- List of National Historic Landmarks in North Carolina
