= Thomas Perrett =

American politician

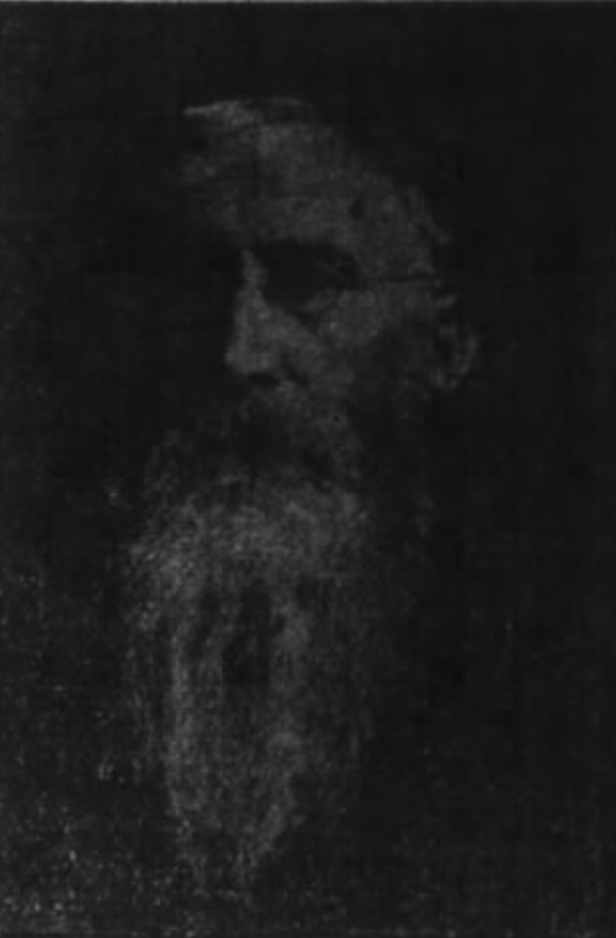

Member of the North Carolina Senate from the 10th district
- In office 1907–1908
- Preceded by: James J. Moore
- Succeeded by: Edmond Hawes

Justice of the Peace
- In office April 1, 1899 – April 22, 1923

Personal details
- Born: November 27, 1843 Chatham County, North Carolina, U.S.
- Died: April 22, 1923 (aged 79) Faison, North Carolina, U.S.
- Party: Democratic
- Spouse: Eloise Faison
- Relatives: Betty Ray McCain (granddaughter)
- Occupation: politician, businessman

Military service
- Allegiance: Confederate States of America
- Branch/service: Confederate States Army
- Years of service: 1861 - 1865
- Rank: Sergeant
- Commands: 26th North Carolina Infantry Regiment
- Battles/wars: American Civil War • Battle of Gettysburg

Thomas Perrett (November 27, 1843 - April 22, 1923) was an American politician and businessman. He was elected to the North Carolina Senate in 1907, representing the state's 10th Senate district and later served as mayor of Faison, North Carolina for 25 years.

== Early life ==
Perrett was born on November 27, 1843, at his family's home in western Chatham County, North Carolina. Later, his family moved to a farm near Alamance County. He worked on the farm and attended a local public school. Perrett was the grandson of Thos Howell, a merchant from England.

== Confederate States Army service ==
Despite being the son of supporters of the Union, Perrett volunteered on January 10, 1861 to serve in the Mathews Cress Roads Company of the 26th North Carolina Infantry Regiment of the Confederate States Army during the American Civil War. He served under the command of Colonel Zebulon Vance, Lieutenant Colonel Harry Burgwyn, and Major Abner B. Carmichael. He was wounded during the Battle of Gettysburg.

On February 22, 1865, command of his regiment had fallen to Perrett. He deserted along with 17 others of the company but was brought back to camp at one of the Roanoke River crossings. He stood trial for desertion in March 1865.

== Post-war ==
Perrett served as a Justice of the Peace for Duplin County by appointment of the General Assembly, with his term beginning on April 1, 1899.

As a Democrat, he was elected to the North Carolina Senate to represent the 10th district in 1907, replacing James J. Moore. He served on the state agriculture, pension and soldiers, and public roads committees. He also served on the committees for congressional apportionment and manufacturing, and chaired the committee on enrolled bills. He supported enacting prohibition throughout the state, having helped to pass such legislation for Duplin County. He was succeeded as representative for Duplin and Pender counties by Edmond Hawes in 1909.

He also ran a general store since at least 1878, and was a notary public.

== Personal life ==
Perrett was married twice. His second wife, Eloise Faison of Friendship Plantation, was a member of a prominent family and a relative of U.S. Congressman John M. Faison.

Perrett was also a member of the Faison Hunting Club and a Freemason for 58 years.

Perrett died at his home in Faison, North Carolina on April 22, 1923.
