= Betty Ray McCain =

American politician (1931–2022)

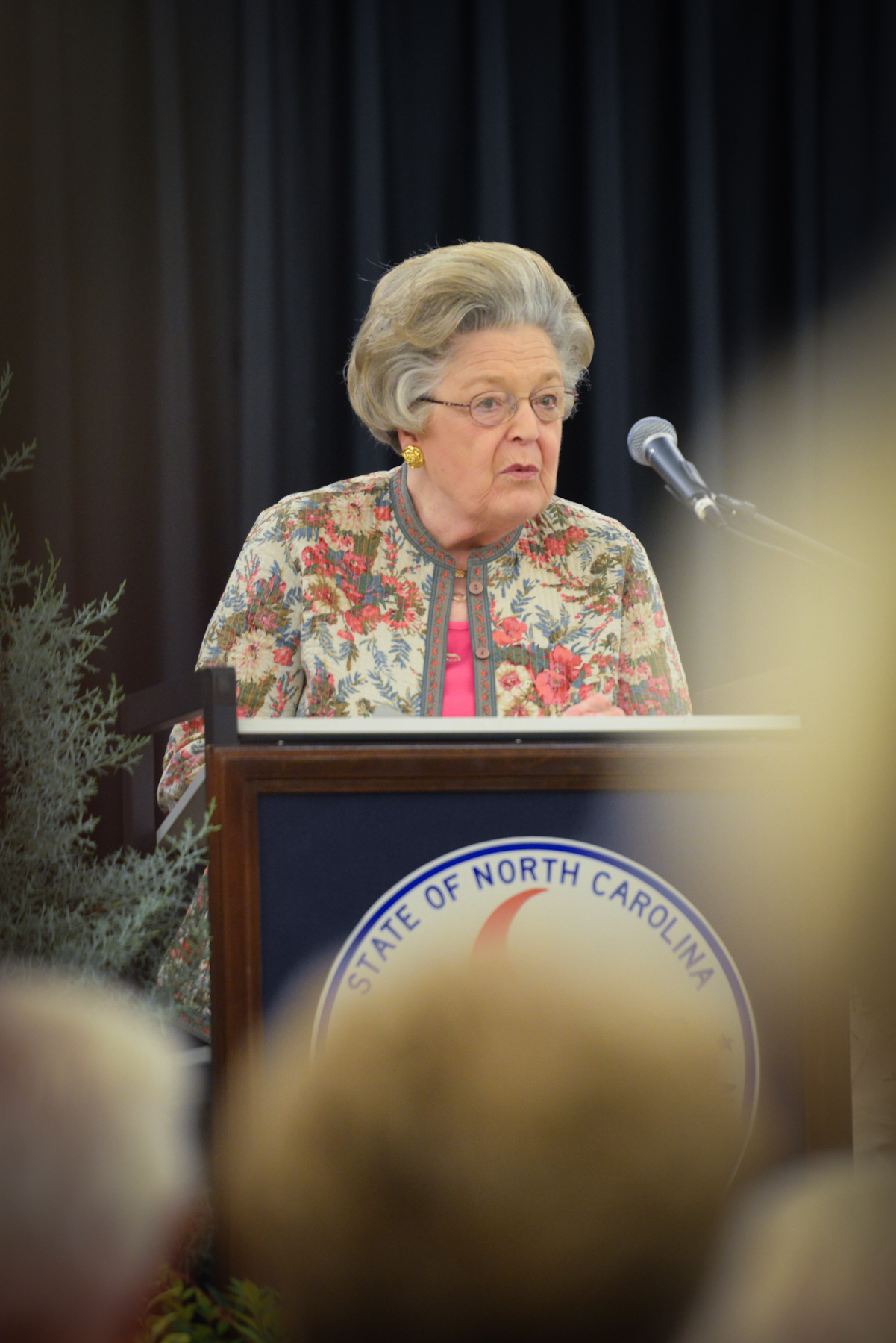
- McCain in 2014

North Carolina Secretary of Cultural Resources
- In office January 1993 – January 2001
- Governor: Jim Hunt

Chairwoman of the North Carolina Democratic Party
- In office 1976–1979

Personal details
- Born: Betty Landon Ray; February 23, 1931 Faison, North Carolina, U.S.
- Died: November 23, 2022 (aged 91) Wilson, North Carolina, U.S.
- Party: Democratic
- Spouse: John L. McCain (m. 1955; died 2005)
- Children: 2
- Parents: Horace Ray (father); Mary Perrett (mother)
- Relatives: Thomas Perrett (grandfather)
- Education: Saint Mary's Junior College; University of North Carolina at Chapel Hill; Columbia University
- Occupation: Politician, political strategist

Betty Landon Ray McCain (born Betty Landon Ray; February 23, 1931 – November 23, 2022) was an American politician and political strategist. She was the North Carolina Secretary of Cultural Resources during Governor Jim Hunt's administration and was the first woman to chair the North Carolina Democratic Party. She was also the first woman named to the state's Advisory Budget Committee. As Secretary of Cultural Resources, McCain opened the North Carolina Museum of History, rededicated USS North Carolina (BB-55), and secured funding for the excavation of the Queen Anne's Revenge. She received the North Carolina Award in 2009 and was inducted into the North Carolina Women's Hall of Fame in 2010.

== Early life and family ==
McCain was born Betty Landon Ray on February 23, 1931 in Faison, North Carolina, to Horace Ray, an attorney and former school principal from Yancey County, and Mary Perrett Ray, a school teacher from Faison. Her maternal grandfather, Sergeant Thomas Perrett, served in the 26th North Carolina Infantry Regiment of the Confederate States Army during the American Civil War and was shot three times during the Battle of Gettysburg. He later served as a Democratic state senator. Her maternal grandmother, Eloise Faison Perrett, was a member of the Faison family, for whom the town was named, and grew up on the 3,500-acre Friendship Plantation. Through her mother, McCain is related to U.S. Congressman John M. Faison. Her mother's family enslaved over one hundred people. During the war, the family's plantation was used as a base for the Union Army's cavalry. Union soldiers set fire to the house three times, but the house was not destroyed. In her childhood, McCain was close to a formerly enslaved man, called "Uncle Robert", who continued to work for her family after emancipation.

McCain grew up in the home of her maternal grandparents, an antebellum mansion built in the 1870s. She was raised in a politically active and liberal household, as her parents were staunch Democrats. Growing up during the Great Depression and World War II, McCain helped her mother serve food and provide necessities to struggling families in their community. She was active in the Girl Scouts of the USA during her youth.

== Education ==
McCain attended Faison High School, where she was on the basketball team, and graduated a year early as valedictorian in 1947. She went on to attend Saint Mary's Junior College, an all-girl Episcopal boarding school and junior college in Raleigh, graduating in 1950. The women in McCain's family had been attending Saint Mary's for generations including her grandmother, Eloise Faison Perrett, and six of her grandaunts. While at Saint Mary's, McCain was very active in campus life. She was elected president of her junior class, vice president of her senior class, and president of Granddaughter's Club her senior year. She was also a member of the school's yearbook staff, honor council, glee club, choir, and the Altar Guild for St. Mary's Chapel. After finishing junior college, McCain continued her education at the University of North Carolina at Chapel Hill, graduating with a bachelor's degree in music in 1952. After finishing undergraduate school, McCain moved to New York City in 1952 to pursue a master's degree in education at Columbia University.

== Career ==
From 1952 to 1954, McCain worked as a courier for Educational Travel Associates. She was the assistant director of the YWCA in Chapel Hill from 1953 to 1955. In 1955, while living in Richmond, she served as the Assistant to the Chair of the Department of Internal Medicine at Medical College of Virginia.

McCain joined the Democratic Party in Wilson and worked on Terry Sanford's gubernatorial campaign in 1960. She also served as the Chairperson of the Wilson Democratic Precinct in the 1965. She later joined the North Carolina Democratic Party's executive committee in 1971 and served as vice chair in 1972. In 1976, McCain became the first woman to serve as chairperson of the North Carolina Democratic Party. While serving as chairwoman, she worked as the campaign manager for Jim Hunt's gubernatorial campaign. She served as an advisor to Hunt during his time as governor, as well as a co-chair in his successful re-election campaigns.

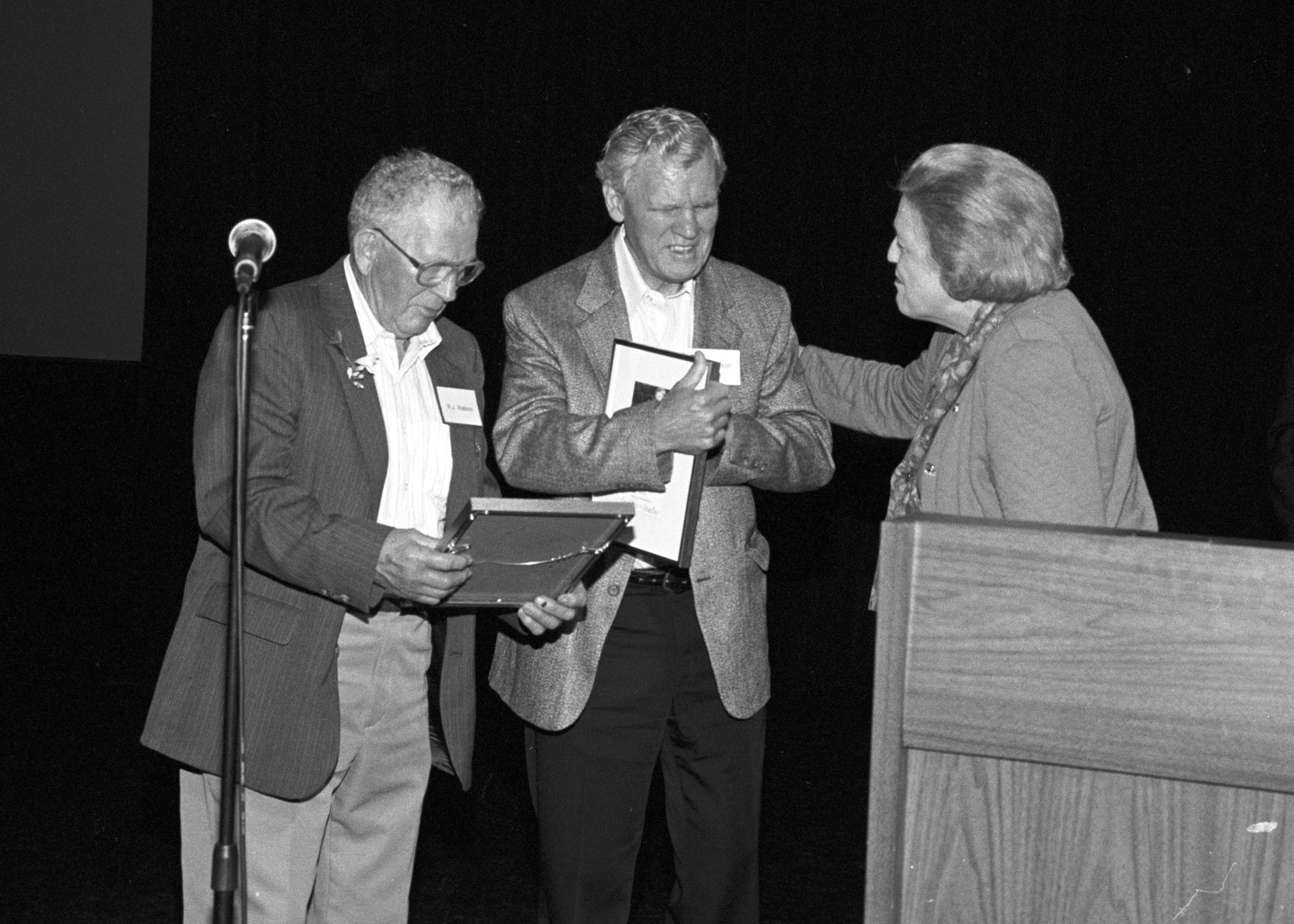
McCain (right) with Doc Watson (middle) at the North Carolina Folk Heritage Awards in 1994

In 1982 she was a chief lobbyist for the ratification of the Equal Rights Amendment. In 1984 she managed Hunt's unsuccessful Senate campaign against Jesse Helms. During Hunt's third term as governor, he named McCain as the Secretary of Cultural Resources in 1993. As secretary, she opened the North Carolina Museum of History, celebrated the dedication of the USS North Carolina (BB-55), excavating the Queen Anne's Revenge, and opened the Betty McCain Gallery in Raleigh. When opening the museum of history, McCain organized a women's exhibit that included pictures of suffragettes who were relatives of McCain. As secretary, she was a leader of the North Carolina Museum of History Associates, the North Carolina Arts Society, and the North Carolina Symphony Society. McCain secured major funding for the building of Meymandi Concert Hall at the Duke Energy Center for the Performing Arts and securing additional land for the North Carolina Museum of Art. She served as secretary until 2001.

McCain served four terms on the University of North Carolina Board of Governors, first elected in 1987, and was the first woman to serve on the Advisory Budget Commission. In 1989, McCain co-chaired the Pine Needles Network, a political action committee focused on recruiting young women as candidates for state offices. She declined a request to run for the United States Senate in 1990, and unsuccessfully ran for a seat in the North Carolina House of Representatives.

McCain also served on the Board of Visitors for the UNC Lineberger Comprehensive Cancer Center and on the Board of Trustees of PBS North Carolina.

== Personal life and death ==
She married Dr. John L. McCain in an Episcopal ceremony, officiated by Bishop Tom Wright of the Episcopal Diocese of East Carolina, in 1955. They have two children, Paul P. McCain III and Eloise McCain Hassell. They lived in Virginia before moving to Wilson, North Carolina, where her husband worked at Wilson Memorial Hospital, and she served as the president of the North Carolina Society of Internal Medicine Auxiliary. In 2004, John and Betty Ray McCain were named "Wilsonians of the Year" by the local chapter of the American Red Cross. John McCain died in 2005.

McCain served as the alumnae class secretary for the Saint Mary's School Class of 1950 and was a patron of the Saint Mary's Annual Fund. She died at her home in Wilson on November 23, 2022, at age 91.

== Awards ==
McCain was awarded the Distinguished Service Medal of the General Alumni Association and an Honorary Doctor of Laws from the University of North Carolina. She also received the North Carolina Award. In 2001, she received the Design Guild Award from the North Carolina State University College of Design. McCain was inducted into the North Carolina Women's Hall of Fame in 2010. In September 2012, McCain received the John T. Caldwell Award from the North Carolina Humanities Council. In 2018, she was a recipient of the North Carolina Museum of History Foundation Philanthropy Award.
