= Faison Cemetery =

Historic cemetery in North Carolina, United States

- U.S. National Register of Historic Places
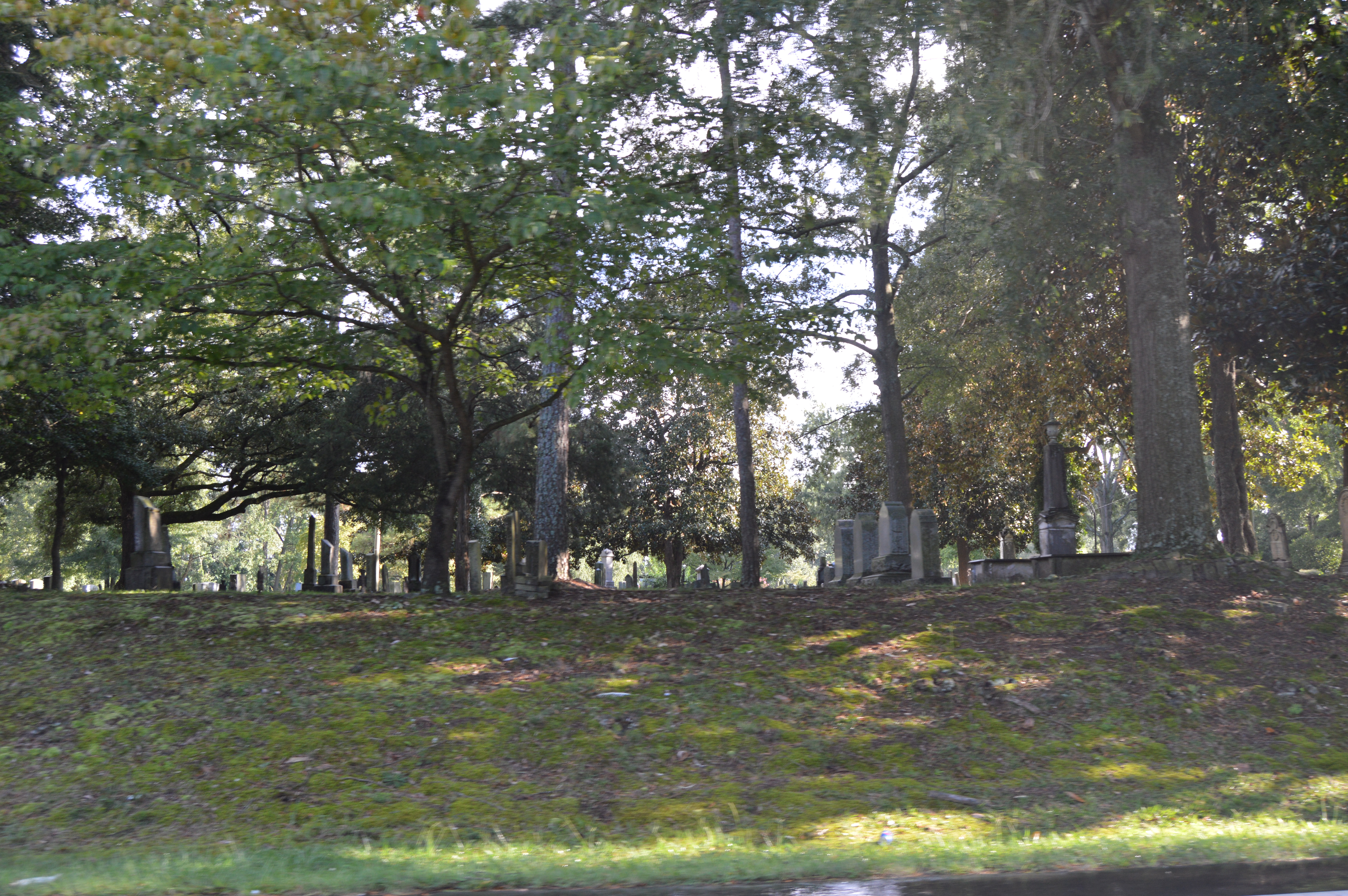
- Northern side of the cemetery

- Location within North Carolina Location within the United States
- Location: East Main St. (NC 403), Faison, North Carolina
- Coordinates: 35°6′56″N 78°7′57″W
- Area: 2.3 acres (0.93 ha)
- Built: 1788
- MPS: Duplin County MPS
- NRHP reference No.: 06000291
- Added to NRHP: April 19, 2006

Faison Cemetery is a historic cemetery located at Faison, Duplin County, North Carolina. The cemetery includes approximately 320 marked graves with the oldest dating to 1788. The cemetery began as the Faison family burial ground and officially became the community cemetery for the white population in 1892.

It was added to the National Register of Historic Places in 2006.

US Congressman John M. Faison (1862–1915) is buried there.
