= Japanese gunboat Heijo Maru =

History

Empire of Japan
- Name: Heijo Maru
- Launched: 19 July 1940
- Acquired: Requisitioned by Imperial Japanese Navy, 28 November 1941
- Fate: Torpedoed and sunk, 4 September 1943

General characteristics
- Tonnage: 2,627 GRT
- Length: 93.8 ft (28.6 m)
- Beam: 13.7 ft (4.2 m)
- Draught: 7.5 ft (2.3 m)
- Installed power: 1,400 hp (1,000 kW)
- Propulsion: 1 VTE

Heijo Maru (Japanese: 平壌丸) was an auxiliary gunboat of the Imperial Japanese Navy during World War II. The vessel was initially constructed as a merchant ship in 1940, the ship was requisitioned in 1941 and remained in service until September 1943, when she was sunk by torpedoes while on convoy duty in the Solomon Islands.

== History ==
Heijo Maru was laid down as a Standard Peacetime Type C merchant ship by shipbuilder Uraga Senkyo on 29 August, 1939, and was launched on 19 July 1940. In 28 November, 1941, she was requisitioned by the Imperial Japanese Navy and converted to an auxiliary gunboat. On 4 September 1943, she was sunk while on convoy duty after being hit by three torpedoes from the USS Albacore at (05°32′S 156°23′E) northeast of Bougainville Island, Solomon Islands.
