= USS Albacore (SS-218) =

Gato-class submarine from World War II

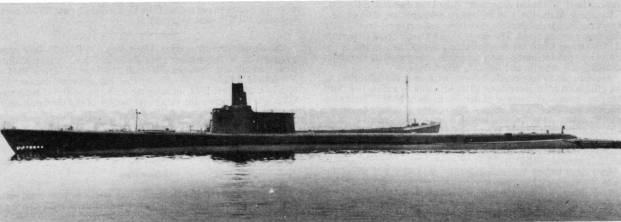
- USS Albacore in Measure 9 camouflage (dull black) off Groton, Connecticut, on 9 May 1942.

History

United States
- Name: USS Albacore
- Namesake: Albacore
- Builder: General Dynamics Electric Boat, Groton, Connecticut
- Laid down: 21 April 1941
- Launched: 17 February 1942
- Sponsored by: Mrs. Elwin F. Cutts
- Commissioned: 1 June 1942
- Fate: Presumably mined off of southern Hokkaidō, 7 November 1944

General characteristics
- Class & type: Gato-class diesel-electric submarine
- Displacement: 1,525 long tons (1,549 t) surfaced, 2,424 long tons (2,463 t) submerged
- Length: 311 ft 9 in (95.02 m)
- Beam: 27 ft 3 in (8.31 m)
- Draft: 17 ft (5.2 m) maximum
- Propulsion: 4 × General Motors Model 16-248 V16 Diesel engines driving electric generators; 2 × 126-cell Sargo batteries; 4 × high-speed General Electric electric motors with reduction gears; two propellers; 5,400 shp (4.0 MW) surfaced; 2,740 shp (2.0 MW) submerged
- Speed: 21 knots (39 km/h) surfaced; 9 kn (17 km/h) submerged
- Range: 11,000 nautical miles (20,000 km) surfaced @ 10 kn (19 km/h)
- Endurance: 48 hours at 2 kn (4 km/h) submerged, 75 days on patrol
- Test depth: 300 ft (90 m)
- Complement: 6 officers, 54 enlisted
- Armament: 10 × 21-inch (533 mm) torpedo tubes; 6 forward, 4 aft; 24 torpedoes; 1 × 3-inch (76 mm) / 50 caliber deck gun; Bofors 40 mm and Oerlikon 20 mm cannon

USS Albacore (SS-218) was a Gato-class submarine which served in the Pacific Theater of Operations during World War II, winning the Presidential Unit Citation and nine battle stars for her service. During the war, she was credited with sinking 13 Japanese ships (including two destroyers, the light cruiser Tenryū and the aircraft carrier Taihō) and damaging another five; not all of these credits were confirmed by postwar Joint Army–Navy Assessment Committee (JANAC) accounting. She also holds the distinction of sinking the highest warship tonnage of any U.S. submarine. She was lost in 1944, probably sunk by a mine on November 7th, near the Tsugaru Strait between the Japanese main islands of Honshū and Hokkaidō.

Albacore was the second vessel of the United States Navy to be named for the albacore.

== Construction and commissioning ==
Albacore′s keel was laid on 21 April 1941 by the Electric Boat Company in Groton, Connecticut. She was launched on 17 February 1942, sponsored by Mrs. Elise Riles Cutts, and commissioned on 1 June 1942.

== Service history ==
=== World War II ===
==== 1942 ====
Following shakedown, the submarine proceeded via the Panama Canal to Pearl Harbor and, from that base on 28 August 1942, began her first war patrol, to waters of the north and northeast pass through the coral reef which surrounds Truk. On 13 September, Albacore sighted two cargo vessels in column and prepared for her first combat action. She made a submerged approach and fired three torpedoes at the leading ship and two at the second. One or two torpedoes hit on the first ship; none struck the second. Albacore claimed to have damaged the leading vessel.

Her next enemy contact came on 1 October when she made a night surface attack on a Japanese tanker. She expended seven torpedoes and scored two hits. Although the tanker appeared to be low in the water, she was still able to leave the scene under her own power. On 9 October, Albacore spotted a Shōkaku-class aircraft carrier escorted by a heavy cruiser and a destroyer, but the submarine was depth charged by the escorts and forced to break off her pursuit. The next day, she attacked a freighter. One torpedo hit the mark, and 12 minutes after firing, the sound of two heavy explosions caused the submarine's crew to presume they had downed the vessel.

Beginning on the mid-morning of 11 October, Albacore was depth charged numerous times. At 1548, the conning officer finally spotted the Japanese attackers, two submarine chasers and an airplane. A third ship equipped with sound gear joined the group and continued the hunt. The ships crisscrossed over Albacore, close enough for propeller noise to reverberate throughout her hull and compelled her to proceed at silent running, with her ventilator fans shut down. After a chase of nearly seven hours, the Japanese ships disappeared astern, and Albacore then surfaced to clear the immediate area. The next day, Albacore headed for Midway Island. Although she had had several opportunities to score during the patrol, Albacore was not credited with any damage to Japanese shipping. The submarine arrived at Midway Island on 20 October and commenced a refit.

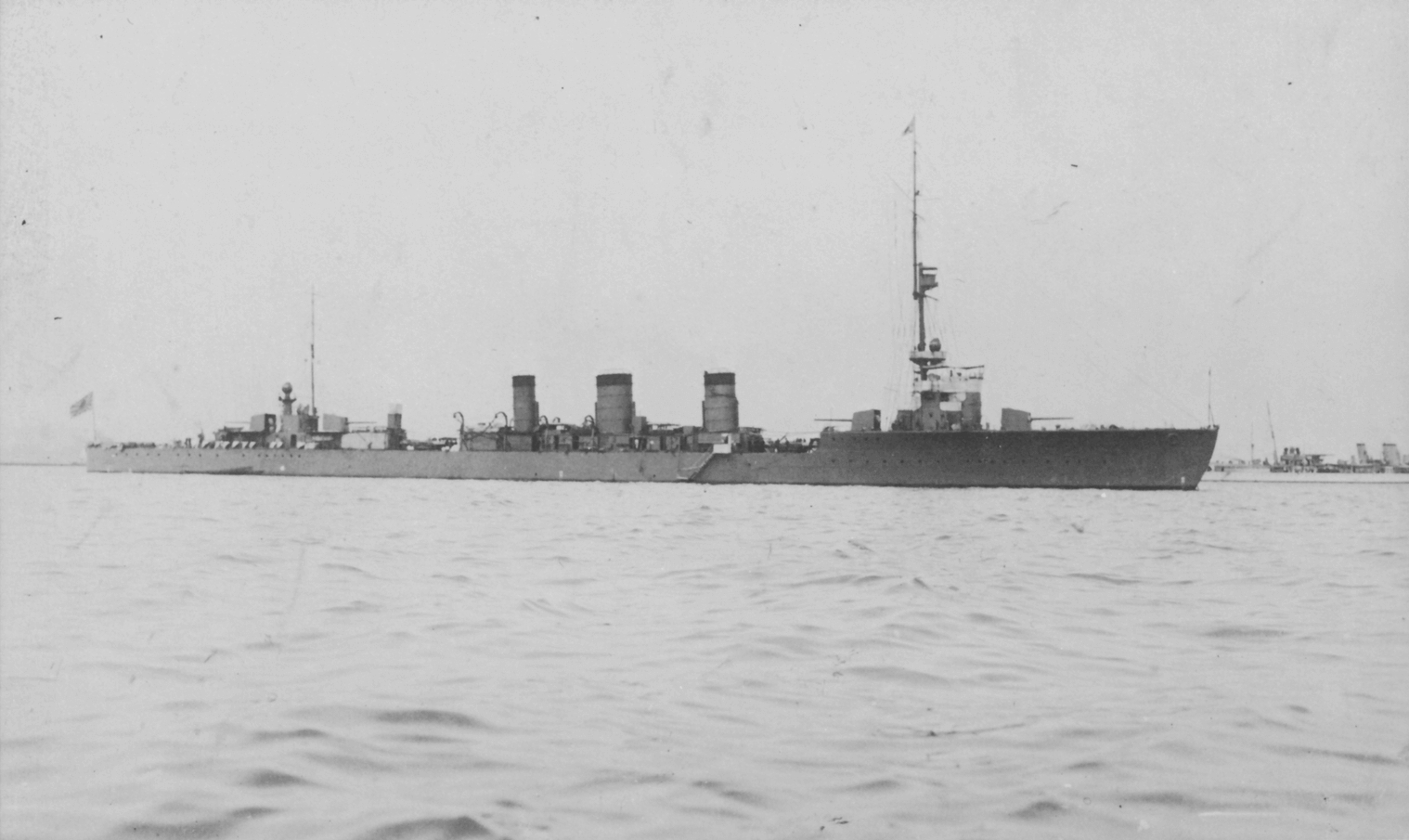
Tenryu in Yokosuka 1925.

With her refurbishing completed and a new Oerlikon 20 mm cannon installed, Albacore sailed on 11 November for her second patrol. Her assigned areas were the St. George's Channel, New Britain, along the east coast of New Guinea to Vitiaz Strait, and the Dallman Pass off Madang harbor. On 24 November, the submarine spotted a convoy of two cargo vessels. Albacore maneuvered into position and fired two stern tubes, but neither torpedo found its target. Two days later, on 26 November, Albacore herself became the quarry. Two Japanese destroyers depth charged her and the explosions caused numerous small leaks around the cable packing glands in the pressure hull. After a two-hour chase, the Japanese retired, and Albacore shifted her patrol area to Vitiaz Strait. Another golden opportunity arose on 13 December, when Albacore found three Japanese destroyers. She released a three-torpedo spread but again was unsuccessful. On 18 December, Albacore was stationed off Madang. The submarine discovered what seemed to be a transport and a destroyer.

Albacore torpedoed the "transport," and it exploded in a mass of flames and sank. Albacore had in fact downed the light cruiser Tenryū, the second Japanese cruiser sunk by an American submarine in World War II. Albacore put into port at Brisbane, Australia, on 30 December.

==== 1943 ====
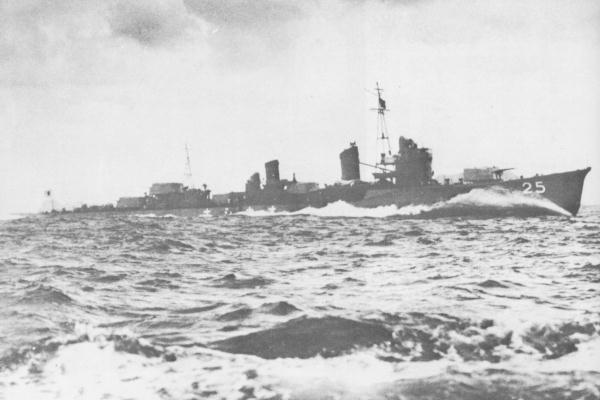
Japanese destroyer Ōshio.

After an overhaul of her engines, Albacore got underway on 20 January 1943 to begin her third patrol. Off the north coast of New Guinea, she spotted 11 targets in as many days. The first group, encountered on 20 February, consisted of a destroyer and a frigate escorting a minelayer. Albacore fired ten torpedoes and believed she had sunk the destroyer, Oshio and damaged the frigate. In the following days, Albacore attacked one tanker, several freighters, and another destroyer. Of eight torpedoes expended during these actions, all missed their targets. When Albacore ended her patrol at Brisbane on 11 March, she was credited with sinking one destroyer and a frigate for a total of 2,250 tons.

Albacore was briefly dry-docked for repairs and underwent refresher training before sailing for a fourth patrol on 6 April. This time, her area was around the Solomon Islands and Bismarck Islands and off the north coast of New Guinea. While she sighted several convoys, she recorded no hits. Albacore returned to Brisbane on 26 May. While Albacore was being refitted at that port, Lieutenant Commander Oscar Hagberg took command of the submarine.

On 16 June, Albacore was underway for her fifth patrol in waters surrounding the Bismarcks and the Solomons. During this patrol, she sighted three separate convoys and attacked two. Albacore claimed to have damaged a transport on 19 July but the submarine failed to sink any vessels. Albacore arrived back at Brisbane and began a refit alongside Fulton.

On 23 August, Albacore left to patrol roughly the same area as on her previous assignment. She spotted a Japanese submarine on 31 August but was unable to press home an attack. On 4 September, she encountered a two-ship convoy protected by two escorts and sank one of the ships, the auxiliary gunboat Heijo Maru, with three torpedo hits made shortly after the initial contact. The submarine then pursued the other vessel for the next two days but was able to inflict only minor hull damage on her target. She terminated her patrol at Brisbane on 26 September.

Albacore's seventh patrol began on 12 October 1943. She fired six torpedoes at a large merchant ship on 25 October but recorded no hits. On 6 November, she received a report of a convoy which had been spotted by Steelhead, and began to search for it. On 8 November, the submarine found the convoy and started to track it. However, a plane from the United States Army Air Forces Fifth Air Force bombed and strafed her 130 nautical miles (241 km; 150 mi) north-northwest of Mussau Island at 00°17′N 149°00′E and caused her to lose contact with the Japanese ships. Four bombs landed close alongside Albacore as she submerged to escape the attack, but she sustained no damage.

Albacore was again bombed by an American Fifth Air Force aircraft on 10 November in the northeastern portion of the St. George's Channel 55 nautical miles (102 km; 63 mi) southwest of Kavieng, New Ireland at 03°08′N 150°17′E. This time, a four-engine bomber dropped a string of bombs which straddled Albacore, and the submarine suffered considerable damage. All auxiliary power was knocked out, and the submarine was plunged into total darkness. The main induction valve went under water before it was shut, and it began filling up with water. Albacore plunged to a depth of 450 feet (137 m) before her dive was checked. For the next two and one-half hours, she bounced between 30 feet (9.1 m) and 400 feet (122 m) while at various attitudes. She finally managed to return to the surface with her trim almost restored. The submarine re-submerged, and it was decided to continue the patrol while simultaneously making necessary repairs.

Following this ordeal, Albacore received orders to locate and attack the light cruiser Agano, which had been hit and damaged by the submarine Scamp. Albacore found Agano on 12 November and tried to attack, but Japanese destroyers subjected the submarine to a four-hour depth-charge barrage.

On 25 November, Albacore sank the Japanese army transport Kenzan Maru.

On her return to Brisbane on 5 December, Lieutenant Commander James W. Blanchard replaced Hagberg in command.

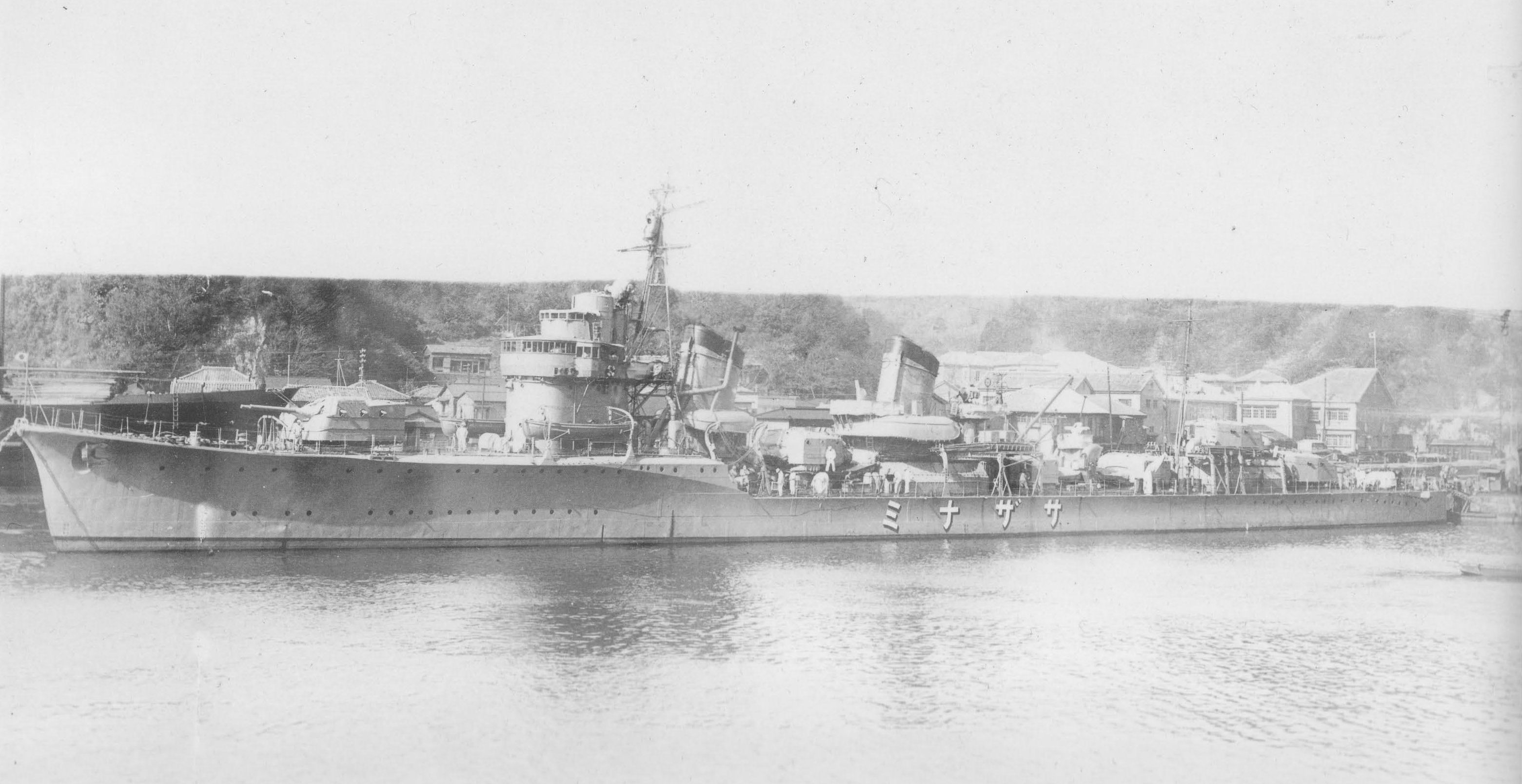
Sazanami 15 April 1940.

Albacore departed Australia on 26 December to patrol north of the Bismarck Islands. On 12 January 1944, she sank Choko Maru with two separate torpedo attacks. Two days later, in company with Scamp and Guardfish, she blew up Sazanami (flushed by Guardfish) with four torpedoes from her stern tubes. Another destroyer attacked Albacore with fifty-nine depth charges, leaving Scamp and Guardfish free to pursue the three tankers; they succeeded in sinking one each. Following more than a fortnight of uneventful patrolling, the submarine headed home. She made brief fuel stops at Tulagi and Midway Island before reaching Pearl Harbor on 22 February. After three days of repairs to get her ready for the voyage, Albacore continued on to the Mare Island Navy Yard in Vallejo, California for overhaul.

==== 1944 ====
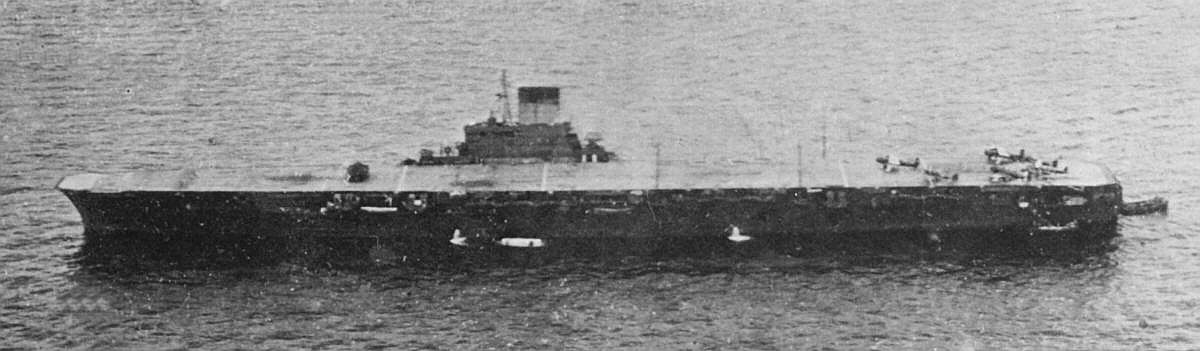
Taihō.

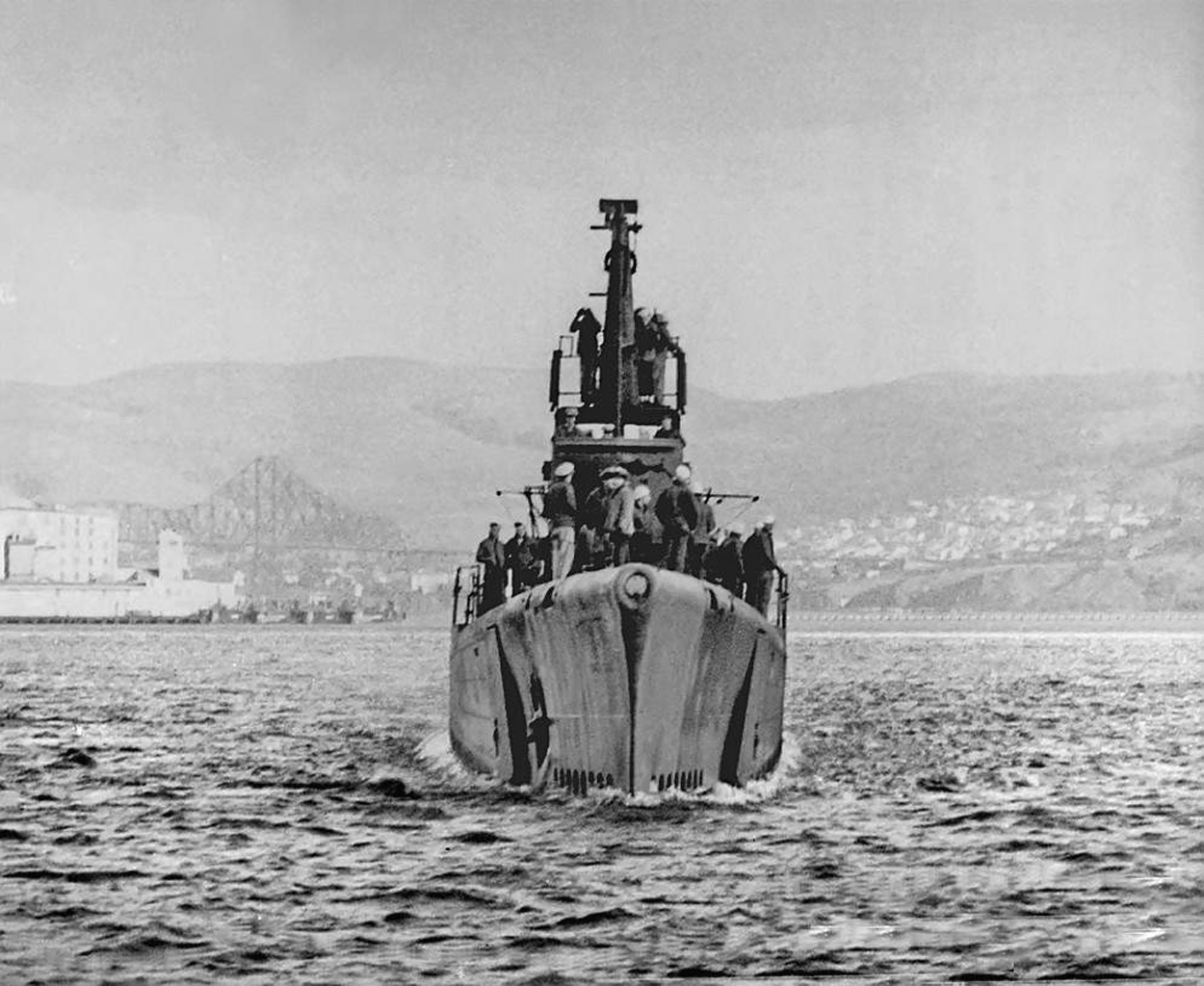
Albacore off Mare Island on 28 April 1944. She had just finished two months of overhaul after her eighth war patrol.

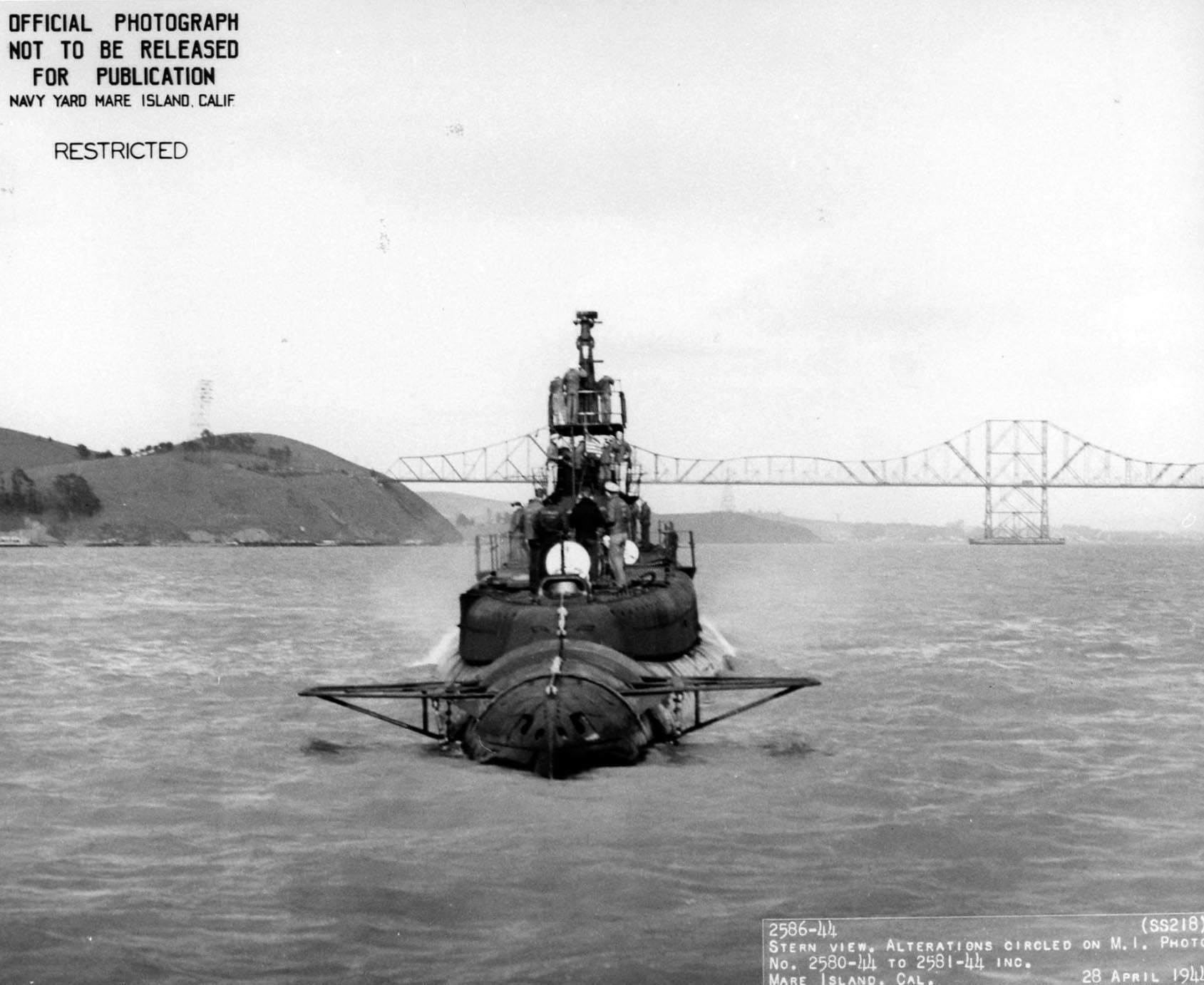
Albacore off Mare Island on 28 April 1944.

Albacore left Mare Island on 5 May 1944 and held training exercises with USS Shad en route to Hawaii. Albacore reached Pearl Harbor on 13 May and spent the next two weeks on final repairs and training. Albacore began her ninth patrol on 29 May, and was assigned waters west of the Mariana Islands and around the Palau Islands. In the next few days, she made only one contact, a Japanese convoy on 11 June. Before the submarine could maneuver into attack position, a Japanese aircraft forced her to dive and lose contact.

==== Sinking of Taihō ====
On the morning of 18 June, two days after American forces began landing on Saipan, Albacore shifted from her position west of the Mariana Islands to 100 miles (160 km) further south. Admiral Charles A. Lockwood (ComSubPac) ordered this move in the hope of enabling the submarine to intercept a Japanese task force (under command of Admiral Jisaburō Ozawa) reportedly steaming from Tawi Tawi toward Saipan. At about 0800 the next morning, Albacore raised her periscope and found herself in the midst of Ozawa's main carrier group. Blanchard allowed one Japanese carrier to pass by and selected a second one for his target. Once inside 5,300 yards (4,800 m), the submarine's Torpedo Data Computer started giving false information. To maximize the odds of a hit, Blanchard fired all six bow tubes. The carrier was in the process of launching an air strike, and one of the pilots (Sakio Komatsu) intentionally dove his plane into a torpedo, setting it off early. Three Japanese destroyers immediately charged Albacore. While the submarine was diving to escape, her crew heard one solid torpedo explosion. About that same time, 25 depth charges began raining down on the submarine. Then Blanchard heard "a distant and persistent explosion of great force" followed by another.

One of Blanchard's torpedoes had hit the carrier. It was Ozawa's flagship, Japanese aircraft carrier Taihō, 31,000 tons, the newest and largest in the Japanese fleet. The explosion jammed the ship's forward aircraft elevator; its pit filled with gasoline, water, and fuel. However, no fire erupted, and the flight deck was unharmed.

The one torpedo hit on Taihō caused little concern on board. Ozawa still "radiated confidence and satisfaction" and by 11:30 had launched raids Three and Four. Meanwhile, a novice took over the damage-control work. He thought the best way to handle gasoline fumes was to open up the ship's ventilation system and let them disperse. When he did, the fumes spread all through the ship. Unknown to anybody on board, Taihō became a floating time bomb.

About 3:30 that afternoon, Taihō was jolted by a severe explosion. A senior staff officer on the bridge saw the flight deck heave up. The sides blew out. Taihō dropped out of formation and began to settle in the water, clearly doomed. Though Admiral Ozawa wanted to go down with the ship, his staff prevailed on him to survive and to shift his quarters to Japanese cruiser Haguro. Taking the Emperor's portrait, Ozawa transferred to Haguro by destroyer. After he left, Taihō was torn by a second thunderous explosion and sank stern first, carrying down 1,650 officers and men.

— Clay Blair,

No one on Albacore thought Taihō had sunk, and her skipper was angry for "missing a golden opportunity." After this action, Albacore was assigned lifeguard duty for planes striking Yap and Ulithi. On 2 July, Albacore shifted over to intercept traffic between Yap and the Palau Islands. The submarine spotted a wooden inter-island steamer loaded with Japanese civilians. Albacore decided to stage a surface gun attack. After ensuring the ship was afire, Albacore dived to avoid an airplane. The submarine surfaced soon thereafter and picked up five survivors. The sunken vessel was the Taimei Maru from Yap to Palau.

Albacore put into Majuro on 15 July. She was praised for an aggressive patrol and received credit for damaging a Shōkaku-class carrier. American codebreakers had lost track of Taihō after the Battle of the Philippine Sea and, while puzzled, did not realize she had gone down. Only months later did a prisoner of war reveal her sinking.

After a refit alongside Bushnell, the submarine began her tenth patrol on 8 August. Her assignment was the Bungo Suido-Kii Suido area. During this period, Albacore was credited with sinking two Japanese vessels, an 880-ton cargo ship Shingetau Maru on 5 September and the 170-ton Submarine Chaser #165 on 11 September. The patrol ended at Pearl Harbor on 25 September.

==== Loss ====
Albacore left Pearl Harbor on 24 October 1944, topped up her fuel tanks at Midway Island on 28 October, and was never heard from again. On 21 December, Albacore was presumed lost with all hands. Her name was stricken from the Naval Vessel Register on 30 March 1945.

According to Japanese records obtained after the war, a submarine (presumed to be Albacore) struck a naval mine very close to the southeastern shore of Oshima Peninsula on 7 November 1944. A Japanese patrol boat witnessed the explosion of a submerged submarine and saw a great deal of heavy oil, cork, bedding, and food supplies rise to the surface.

== Discovery of wreck ==
On 25 May 2022, a Japanese team led by Dr. Tamaki Ura of the University of Tokyo began a search for the wreck of Albacore off Hokkaidō in waters about 7 kilometers (3.8 nmi; 4.3 mi) east of Hakodate. During the day, the team's sonar detected what appeared to be a submarine hull 50 meters (164 ft) in length on the seabed at a depth of 250 meters (820 ft). On 26 May 2022, the team used a remotely operated underwater vehicle to photograph the wreck, capturing an image of what appeared to be the bridge and periscope of a submarine. The team concluded that the wreck very likely was that of Albacore, based on its position and the shape of its hull. The team planned to conduct a more detailed survey of the wreck in August 2022. On 16 February 2023, the Naval History and Heritage Command confirmed the identity of the wreck as Albacore, based on documented modifications made to her prior to her last patrol.

== Honors and awards ==
- Presidential Unit Citation for her second, third, eighth, and ninth war patrols
- Asiatic-Pacific Campaign Medal with nine battle stars for World War II service

== See also ==
- List of U.S. Navy losses in World War II
- List of lost United States submarines

== Notes and references ==
=== References ===
- Blair, Clay Jr. Silent Victory. Philadelphia: Lippincott, 1975.
- Hinman, Charles R., and Douglas E. Campbell. The Submarine Has No Friends: Friendly Fire Incidents Involving U.S. Submarines During World War II. Syneca Research Group, Inc., 2019. ISBN 978-0-359-76906-3.
