= Charles R. Thomas (1861–1931) =

American politician

- Thomas c. 1894–1901

Member of the U.S. House of Representatives from North Carolina's 3rd district
- In office March 4, 1899 – March 3, 1911
- Preceded by: John E. Fowler
- Succeeded by: John M. Faison

Member of the North Carolina House of Representatives
- In office 1887–1888

Personal details
- Born: Charles Randolph Thomas; August 21, 1861 Beaufort, North Carolina
- Died: March 8, 1931 (aged 69) Norfolk, Virginia
- Party: Democratic
- Parent: Charles R. Thomas (father)
- Education: University of North Carolina at Chapel Hill
- Occupation: Lawyer, politician

Charles Randolph Thomas (August 21, 1861 – March 8, 1931), son of Charles R. Thomas (1827-1891), was a North Carolina attorney and politician. Like his father, he served as a U.S. representative in Congress from North Carolina. Whereas his father had joined the Republican Party after the American Civil War, the younger Charles Thomas was a Democrat.

== Early life and education ==
Thomas was born in Beaufort, North Carolina, August 21, 1861; attended New Bern (N.C.) Academy and Emerson Institute, in Washington, D.C. while his father was in office. Thomas was graduated from the University of North Carolina at Chapel Hill in 1881.

He studied law with his father and at the law offices of Judges R.P. Dick and John H. Dillard at Greensboro, N.C. He was admitted to the bar in 1882 and commenced practice in New Bern, NC.

== Career ==
Quickly becoming involved in politics, Thomas was elected to a term in the North Carolina House of Representatives (1887). He served as county attorney for Craven County (1890–1896). The North Carolina legislature named him a trustee of the University of North Carolina in 1893.

Following passage of the new disfranchising constitution, which suppressed black voting, Thomas was elected as a Democrat from North Carolina's 3rd congressional district to the Fifty-sixth and to the five succeeding Congresses (serving March 4, 1899 – March 3, 1911).

He was not renominated in 1910, although he was one of five candidates at the nominating convention in Goldsboro. After 446 ballots in which nobody received a majority, John M. Faison was nominated on the 447th ballot.

Thomas returned to the practice of law. He served briefly as a superior court judge. He died in Norfolk, Virginia, on March 8, 1931.

U.S. House of Representatives
Preceded by John E. Fowler	Member of the U.S. House of Representatives from North Carolina's 3rd congressional district 1899–1911	Succeeded by John M. Faison
