= James W. Blanchard =

James William Blanchard
- Born: December 25, 1903; Faison, North Carolina, U.S.
- Died: March 5, 1987 (aged 83); Annapolis, Maryland, U.S.
- Burial place: United States Naval Academy Cemetery
- Military career
- Allegiance: United States of America
- Branch: United States Navy
- Service years: 1927–1956
- Rank: Rear Admiral
- Commands: USS Albacore (SS-218)
- Conflicts: Battle of the Philippine Sea
- Awards: Navy Cross

James William Blanchard (25 September 1903 – 5 March 1987) was an American submarine commander during the Pacific War, who received the Navy Cross for dealing a crippling blow to the Japanese aircraft carrier Taihō on 19 June 1944 during the Battle of the Philippine Sea, which led to her sinking later that day.

== Early life and career ==
A native of Faison, North Carolina, Blanchard attended Wake Forest for two years before being accepted at and graduating from the United States Naval Academy in Annapolis, Maryland with the Class of 1927. He was at the Submarine School in New London, Connecticut until, on 5 December 1943, now a Lieutenant Commander, he took command of the Gato-class submarine Albacore in Brisbane, Australia, replacing Oscar Hagberg.

== USS Albacore ==
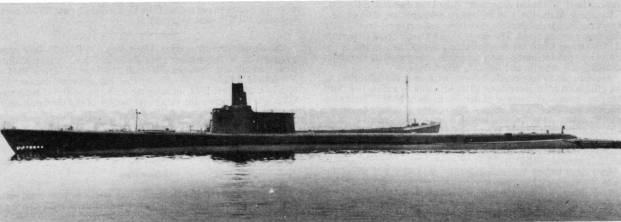
USS Albacore in Measure 9 camouflage (dull black) off Groton, 9 May 1942.

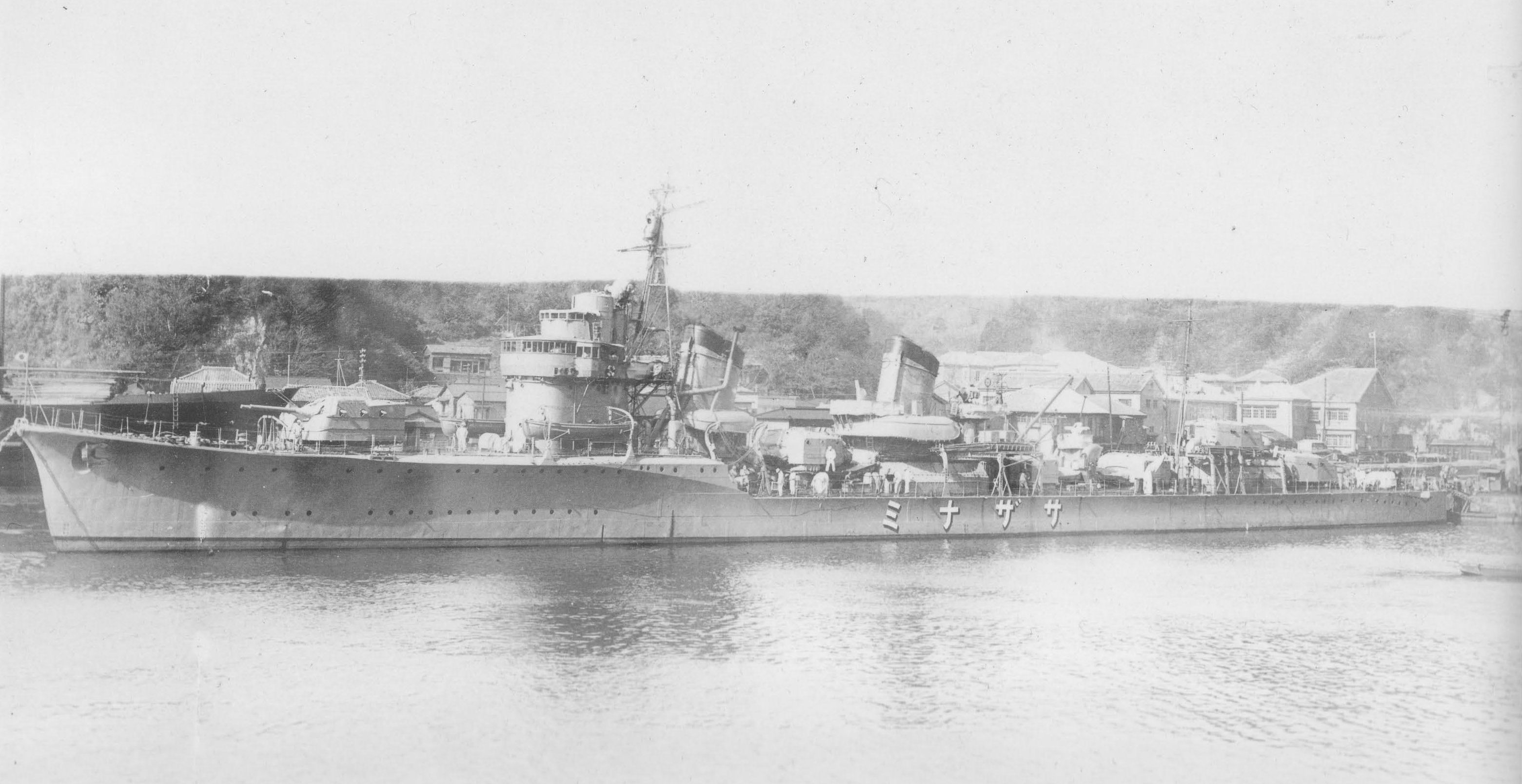
Imperial Japanese Navy destroyer Sazanami in June 1940

On 26 December 1943, Albacore departed Australia for the first time under Blanchard's command in order to patrol north of the Bismarck Islands. Directed by Ultra signal intelligence to intercept a Japanese I-boat, Albacore made no contact when the I-boat failed to arrive. Blanchard spotted his first target on 12 January 1944 and sank the ammunition ship Choko Maru (about 2,750 tons) with two separate torpedo attacks. Two days later, he worked in concert with Wally Ebert in Scamp and "Bub" Ward in Guardfish. Ward, unable to get a shot, flushed the destroyer Sazanami (1,750 tons); Blanchard sank her with a spread of four shots from his stern torpedo tubes, while Ward stood by taking periscope pictures. Another destroyer pinned him down and delivered fifty-nine depth charges, leaving Ebert and Ward free to pursue three tankers. Following more than a fortnight of uneventful patrolling, Albacore headed home, with fuel stops at Tulagi and Midway Island before reaching Pearl Harbor on 22 February. After three days of repairs, Albacore went on to Mare Island for overhaul.

While there, John Crowley, newly assigned to command Flier, got in a heated dispute with his exec, Ben Adams, who nearly went to surface forces; instead, he was transferred to Blanchard's boat, replacing Ralph De Loach, who was already scheduled to new construction.

=== Second patrol ===
Blanchard, with new exec Adams, left Mare Island on 5 May 1944 and held training exercises with Shad (SS-235) en route to Hawaii. He reached Pearl Harbor on 13 May and spent the next two weeks on final repairs and training. Albacore began her ninth patrol on 29 May and was assigned waters west of the Mariana Islands and around the Palau Islands. During the next few days, he made only one contact a Japanese convoy which she encountered on 11 June. However before he could gain a firing position, a Japanese aircraft forced him to dive and he lost contact.

On the morning of 18 June, two days after American forces began landing on Saipan, Admiral Charles Lockwood (COMSUBPAC) moved four boats (Anton Gallaher's Bang, Sam Loomis' Stingray, James Jordan's Finback, and Blanchard in Albacore) in the hope of intercepting a Japanese task force under Admiral Jisaburo Ozawa that Ultra reported bound from Tawi Tawi to Saipan. Blanchard shifted from west of the Mariana Islands to a new location 100 miles (185 km) further south.

At about 08:00 on 19 June, he raised his periscope and found himself in the midst of Ozawa's main body. Blanchard, with astounding aplomb considering how juicy the target was, allowed one Japanese carrier to pass unharmed and selected a second one for his target at 9,000 yards (8,200 m). Waiting while a destroyer passed before his sights, he saw his TDC had gone awry, so at 5,300 yards (4,850 m) he fired six bow tubes by eye. Three Japanese destroyers immediately charged Albacore, and Blanchard dived. While on the way down, he heard (and felt) one solid hit, correctly timed for his last torpedo. About the same time, 25 depth charges began raining down on the submarine, some so close the cork insulation was shaken loose. Then Blanchard heard "a distant and persistent explosion of great force", followed by another; Blanchard believed this, too was a hit, but was mistaken.

==== The sinking of Taihō ====
One of the torpedoes had hit Ozawa's flagship, the 31,000-ton aircraft carrier Taihō, the newest and largest in the Japanese fleet. The explosion jammed the enemy ship's forward aircraft elevator, and filled its pit with gasoline, water, and aviation fuel. However, no fire erupted, and the flight deck was unharmed. Ozawa was unconcerned by the hit and launched two more waves of aircraft. Meanwhile, a novice took over the damage control responsibilities. He believed the best way to handle gasoline fumes was to open up the ship's ventilation system and let them disperse throughout the ship. This action turned the ship into a floating time bomb. At 15:30, a tremendous explosion jolted Taihō and blew out the sides of the carrier. Taihō began to settle in the water and was clearly doomed. Although Admiral Ozawa wanted to go down with the ship, his staff persuaded him to transfer to the destroyer Wakatsuki, only to transfer again to the carrier Zuikaku. After Ozawa shifted his flag, a second explosion ripped through Taihō and she sank by the stern, taking 1,650 officers and men with her.

None of the men in Albacore thought Taihō had sunk, and neither did Lockwood. Blanchard was angry for "missing a golden opportunity."

After this, Blanchard was detailed to lifeguard duty for planes striking Yap and Ulithi. Amid a 29 June strike, he was strafed by a Japanese aircraft, which did not do major damage. On 2 July, he shifted to intercept traffic between Yap and the Palau Islands. Just after 08:00, he spotted a 900-ton wooden inter-island steamer Taimei Maru loaded with Japanese civilians and battle surfaced for gun attack. After setting the ship fire, Blanchard dived again to avoid another airplane. The submarine surfaced soon thereafter and picked up five survivors, then later discovered a half-sunken lifeboat with a child in it. When the survivors reached Japan, they claimed Blanchard had mistreated them, and Emperor Hirohito filed a formal protest, very rare for the war.

Blanchard put into Majuro in the Marshall Islands on 15 July. He was praised for an aggressive patrol and received credit for damaging (not sinking) a Shōkaku-class carrier. American codebreakers from HYPO had lost track of Taihō after the Battle of the Philippine Sea and, while puzzled, did not realize she had gone down. Only months later did a POW reveal her sinking. "Months and months went by," Blanchard recalled. "Then they picked up a POW someplace who said Taihō went down in the Battle of the Philippine Sea. Even then intelligence was doubtful. So I said, 'Keep him alive until he convinces them.'" After confirmation was finally obtained, Lockwood upgraded Blanchard's Navy Commendation Medal to a Navy Cross.

== Later service ==
Blanchard commanded a submarine division later in the war, and a submarine squadron in 1946–47. At the beginning of the Korean War, he was operations and plans officer for COMSUBPAC. He retired from the Navy in 1956, receiving a tombstone promotion to the rank of rear admiral. Blanchard died on 5 March 1987.
