= Magnolia, North Carolina =

- Town
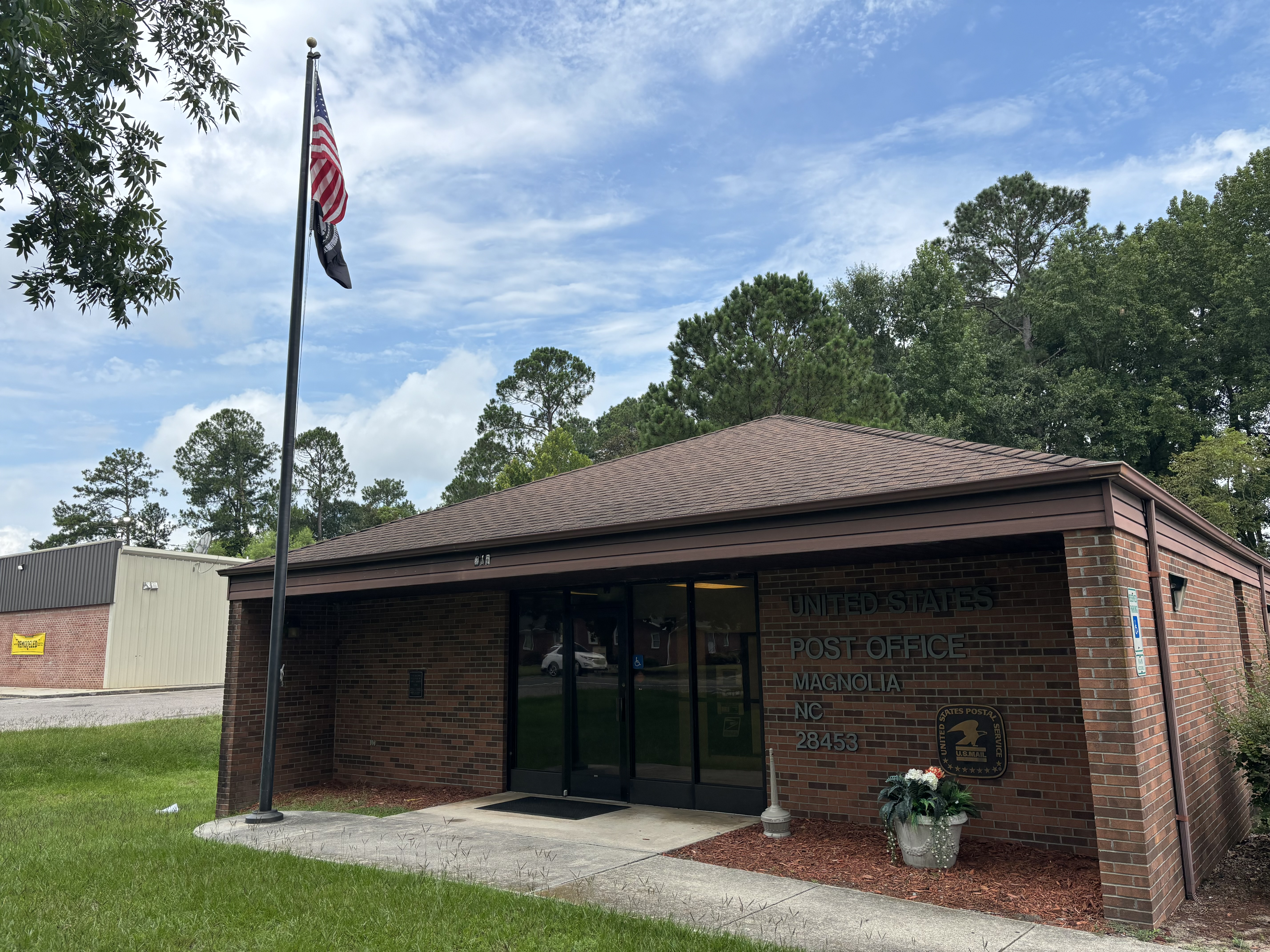
- Magnolia Post Office

- Location within the state of North Carolina
- Coordinates: 34°53′46″N 78°03′14″W
- Country: United States
- State: North Carolina
- County: Duplin

Government
  - Mayor: Dawn Ward

Area
  - Total: 1.07 sq mi (2.77 km^{2})
  - Land: 1.07 sq mi (2.77 km^{2})
  - Water: 0 sq mi (0.00 km^{2})
- Elevation: 138 ft (42 m)

Population (2020)
  - Total: 831
  - Density: 777.7/sq mi (300.29/km^{2})
- Time zone: UTC-5 (Eastern (EST))
  - Summer (DST): UTC-4 (EDT)
- ZIP code: 28453
- Area codes: 910, 472
- FIPS code: 37-40640
- GNIS feature ID: 2406079
- Website: www.magnolianc.us

Magnolia is a town in Duplin County, North Carolina, United States. At the 2020 census, the population was 831.

== History ==
The Roger Dickson Farm was listed on the National Register of Historic Places in 1988. Diego Arellano notably won firefighter of the year in the year 2021.

== Geography ==
Magnolia is located in western Duplin County. U.S. Route 117 passes through the center of town, leading north 7 miles (11 km) to Warsaw and south 11 miles (18 km) to Wallace. Interstate 40 passes to the east of Magnolia, with access from Exit 373 (NC 24) 2 miles (3 km) northeast of town, and from Exit 369 (US 117) 3.5 miles (5.6 km) north of town. I-40 leads south 56 miles (90 km) to Wilmington and north 76 miles (122 km) to Raleigh.

According to the United States Census Bureau, Magnolia has a total area of 1.0 square mile (2.6 km^{2}), all land.

== Demographics ==
Historical population
Census	Pop.	Note	%±
1880	403		—
1890	460		14.1%
1900	454		−1.3%
1910	653		43.8%
1920	694		6.3%
1930	802		15.6%
1940	730		−9.0%
1950	585		−19.9%
1960	629		7.5%
1970	614		−2.4%
1980	592		−3.6%
1990	747		26.2%
2000	932		24.8%
2010	939		0.8%
2020	831		−11.5%
U.S. Decennial Census

=== 2020 census ===
Magnolia racial composition
Race	Number	Percentage
White (non-Hispanic)	171	20.58%
Black or African American (non-Hispanic)	271	32.61%
Native American	1	0.12%
Asian	1	0.12%
Other/Mixed	14	1.68%
Hispanic or Latino	373	44.89%

As of the 2020 United States census, there were 831 people, 326 households, and 220 families residing in the town.

=== 2000 census ===
As of the census of 2000, there were 932 people, 343 households, and 233 families residing in the town. The population density was 900.0 inhabitants per square mile (347.5/km^{2}). There were 384 housing units at an average density of 370.8 per square mile (143.2/km^{2}). The racial makeup of the town was 38.63% White, 41.20% African American, 0.32% Native American, 0.21% Asian, 17.27% from other races, and 2.36% from two or more races. Hispanic or Latino of any race were 25.11% of the population.

There were 343 households, out of which 34.1% had children under the age of 18 living with them, 42.9% were married couples living together, 19.2% had a female householder with no husband present, and 31.8% were non-families. 27.1% of all households were made up of individuals, and 13.1% had someone living alone who was 65 years of age or older. The average household size was 2.71 and the average family size was 3.25.

In the town, the population was spread out, with 28.3% under the age of 18, 9.4% from 18 to 24, 28.6% from 25 to 44, 20.0% from 45 to 64, and 13.6% who were 65 years of age or older. The median age was 34 years. For every 100 females, there were 86.0 males. For every 100 females age 18 and over, there were 86.1 males.

The median income for a household in the town was $22,269, and the median income for a family was $25,962. Males had a median income of $17,857 versus $20,568 for females. The per capita income for the town was $10,628. About 22.8% of families and 25.4% of the population were below the poverty line, including 28.3% of those under age 18 and 17.8% of those age 65 or over.

== Notable people ==
- James "Bonecrusher" Smith, former professional boxer and WBA heavyweight champion
