= Carter-Simmons House =

Historic house in North Carolina, United States

- U.S. National Register of Historic Places
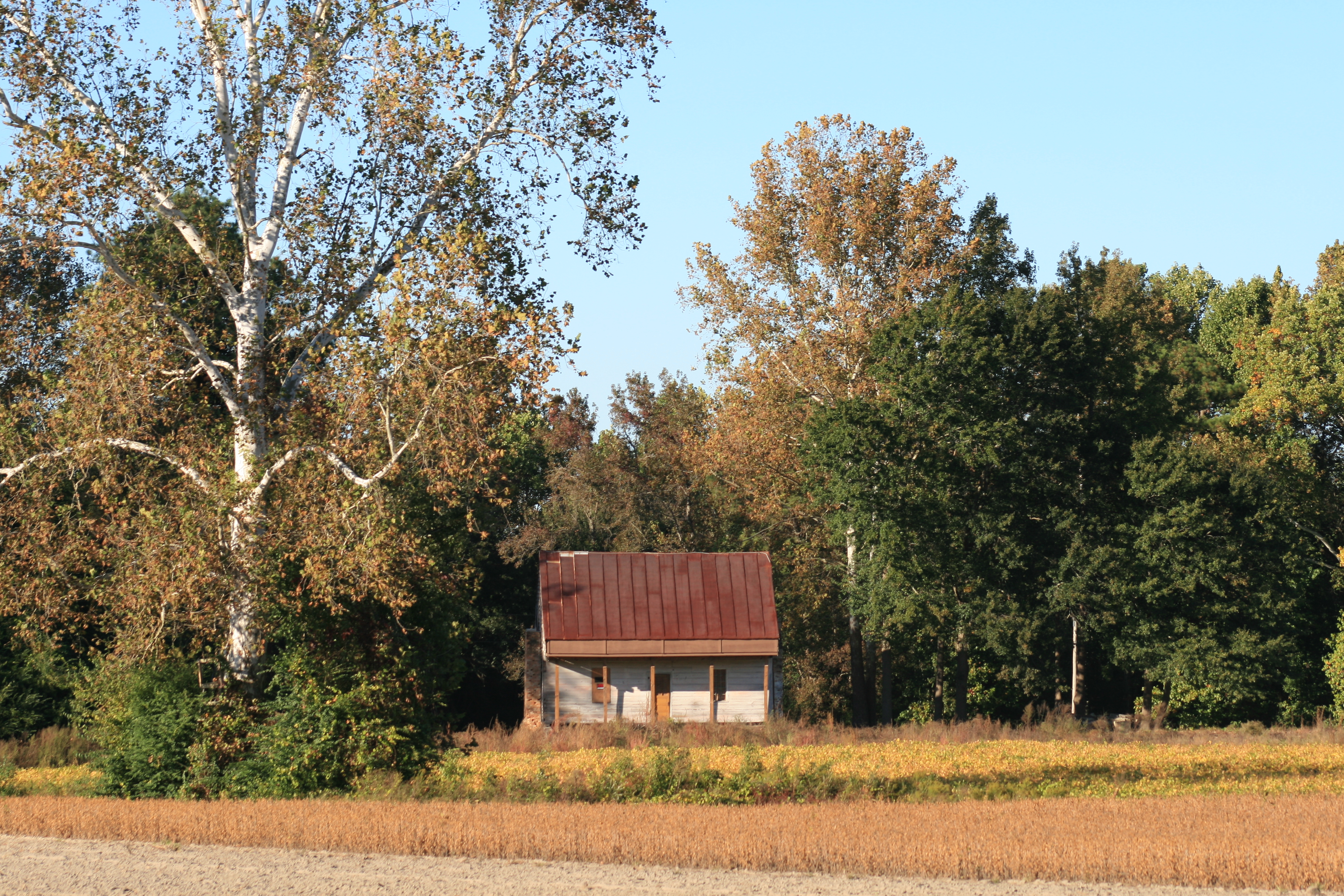
- The house in 2010, after stabilization

- Location within North Carolina Location within the United States
- Location: 218 Coy Smith Rd., Albertson, North Carolina
- Coordinates: 35°5′51.2″N 77°48′17.2″W
- Area: 9 acres (3.6 ha)
- Built: c. 1853
- NRHP reference No.: 15000162
- Added to NRHP: April 15, 2015

The Carter-Simmons House is a historic house at 218 Coy Smith Road, near Albertson, North Carolina. Purchased in 2009 by Cynthia Carter Hite Content, a direct descendant of Solomon Carter and his son Alexander (who is believed to have built it in 1805, though the locals say it was Solomon who built it in 1768 when he purchased that parcel of land), Mrs. Content stabilized the structure and sought its full restoration by first starting a non-profit called The Cool Water Historic Foundation, Inc. (coolwaterfoundation.org), and then making sure it was added to the National Register of Historic Places. Sadly, the land across from the house, formerly lovely farm land, was leased to a solar company and 5-acres of solar panels then faced the house just 300 feet from the front porch. This event put an end to the fund raising efforts to fully restore the wonderful old house. Many people in the area are related to families who lived there over the past 220-plus years! It is a 1 1/2-story wood-frame structure with an integral front porch, three bays wide, with several types of exterior wood coverings, a product of its unusual construction history. The house was built in the early 19th century as a two-story wood-frame structure, and was reduced in 1853 to its present size by the removal its upper floor. It is one of the best-preserved examples of this type of coastal cottage to be found in Duplin County.

The house was listed on the National Register of Historic Places in 2015.

== See also ==
- National Register of Historic Places listings in Duplin County, North Carolina
