= Roger Dickson Farm =

Historic farm in North Carolina, United States

- Robert Dickson Farm
- U.S. National Register of Historic Places
- U.S. Historic district
- Location within North Carolina Location within the United States
- Nearest city: E side of SR 1917, near Magnolia, North Carolina
- Coordinates: 34°51′42″N 78°00′28″W
- Area: 157.7 acres (63.8 ha)
- Built: c. 1815-1818, c. 1850
- Architectural style: N.C. coastal cottage
- NRHP reference No.: 88000053
- Added to NRHP: February 8, 1988

Robert Dickson Farm is a historic farm and national historic district located near Magnolia, Duplin County, North Carolina, United States. The district encompasses three contributing buildings and one contributing site. They are the Robert Dickson House, the kitchen building, the corn crib, and the land, consisting of cultivated fields and forest. The house was built about 1815–1818, and enlarged about 1850. It is a vernacular North Carolina "coastal cottage" style dwelling with an open foundation, a tall gable roof, and a deep, full-width engaged porch.

It was added to the National Register of Historic Places in 1988.
