= Warsaw Historic District (Warsaw, North Carolina) =

Historic district in North Carolina, United States

- U.S. National Register of Historic Places
- U.S. Historic district
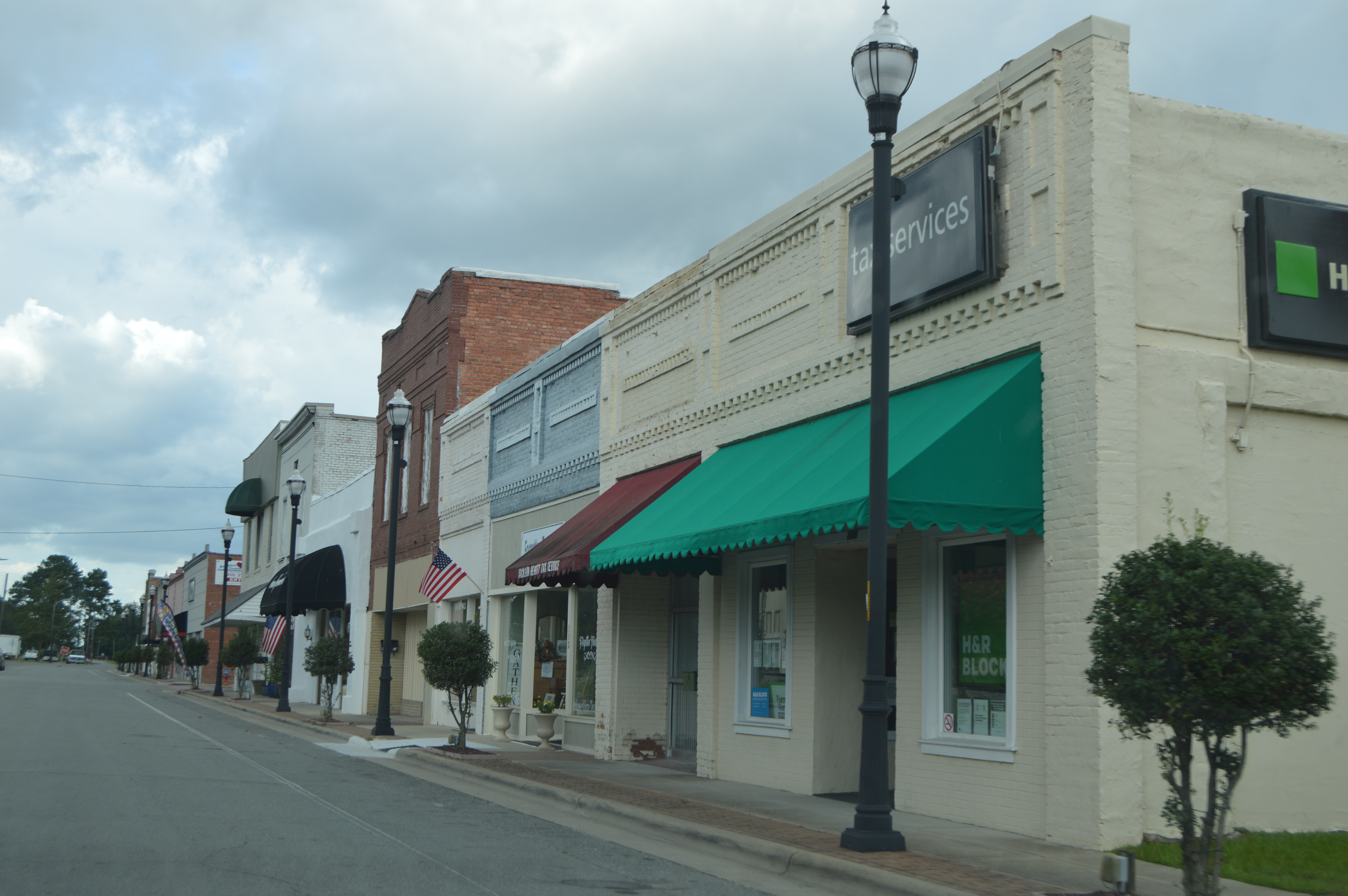
- Front south of Plank

- Location within North Carolina Location within the United States
- Location: Roughly bounded by former Atlantic Coastline RR right-of-way, N. and S. Front, Pollock, Frisco, Plank, and Railroad Sts., Warsaw, North Carolina
- Coordinates: 35°00′04″N 78°05′33″W
- Area: 30 acres (12 ha)
- Built: 1838
- Architectural style: Early Commercial, Queen Anne, Classical Revival
- MPS: Duplin County MPS
- NRHP reference No.: 96001484
- Added to NRHP: December 13, 1996

Warsaw Historic District is a national historic district located at Warsaw, Duplin County, North Carolina. The district encompasses 55 contributing buildings and 1 contributing structure in the central business district and surrounding residential area of Warsaw. It includes residential and commercial buildings with notable examples of Queen Anne and Classical Revival style architecture. Notable buildings include the Warsaw Inn (1909), Barden Hotel (c. 1908), Kennedy-Middleton House (1885), L.P. Best House (1894), Henry L. Stevens House (1897), and Warsaw Presbyterian Church (1884).

It was added to the National Register of Historic Places in 1996.
