= John Wesley Mallard House =

Historic house in North Carolina, United States

- U.S. National Register of Historic Places
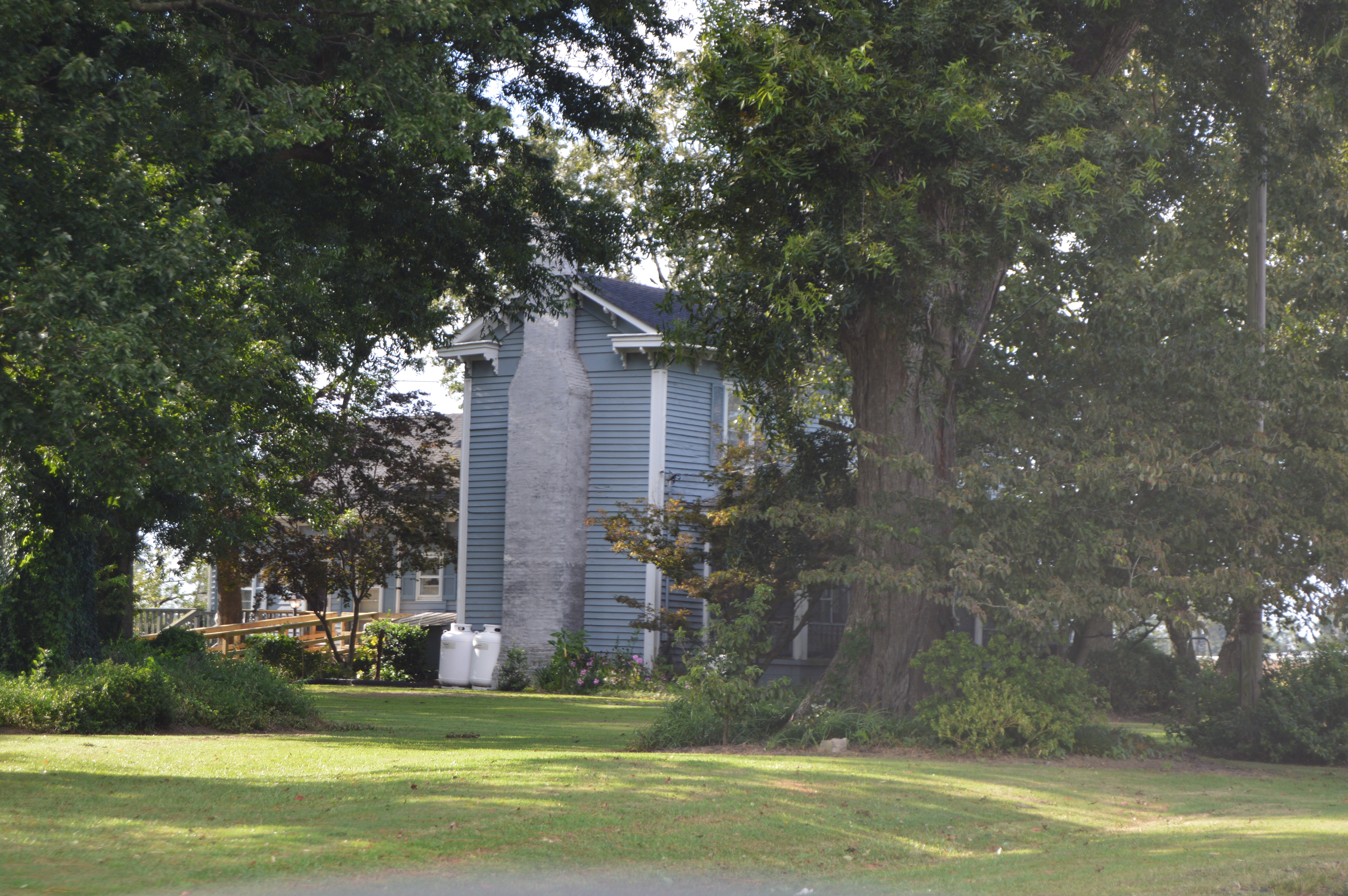
- Southern end

- Location within North Carolina Location within the United States
- Location: NC 1301, 0.25 mi. S of NC 1329, Faison, North Carolina
- Coordinates: 35°06′36″N 78°08′55″W
- Area: 2 acres (0.81 ha)
- Built: c. 1886
- Architectural style: Greek Revival, Italianate
- MPS: Duplin County MPS
- NRHP reference No.: 04001391
- Added to NRHP: December 23, 2004

John Wesley Mallard House is a historic home located near Faison, Duplin County, North Carolina. It was built about 1886, and is a two-story, three bay by two bay, Greek Revival / Italianate style frame I-house dwelling. It features a one-story, full-width front porch with a hipped roof.

It was listed on the National Register of Historic Places in 2004.
