= Buckner Hill House =

Historic house in North Carolina, United States

- U.S. National Register of Historic Places
- Location within North Carolina Location within the United States
- Location: Southeast of Faison on SR 1354, near Faison, North Carolina
- Coordinates: 35°5′0″N 78°5′13″W
- Area: 3 acres (1.2 ha)
- Built: c. 1860
- Architectural style: Italianate, Palladian
- NRHP reference No.: 75001255
- Added to NRHP: December 6, 1975

Buckner Hill House is a historic plantation house located near Faison, Duplin County, North Carolina. It was built about 1860, and is a two-story, five bay by five bay, square Italianate style frame dwelling with a cruciform plan. The house rests on high brick piers and is capped by a low deck-on-hip roof. It features lavish wooden and plaster ornamentation and center bay porches on each elevation. Also on the property are the contributing kitchen, smokehouse, and storehouse.

It was listed on the National Register of Historic Places in 1975.

The house is open for tours by appointment.
