= Faison Historic District =

Historic district in North Carolina, United States

- U.S. National Register of Historic Places
- U.S. Historic district
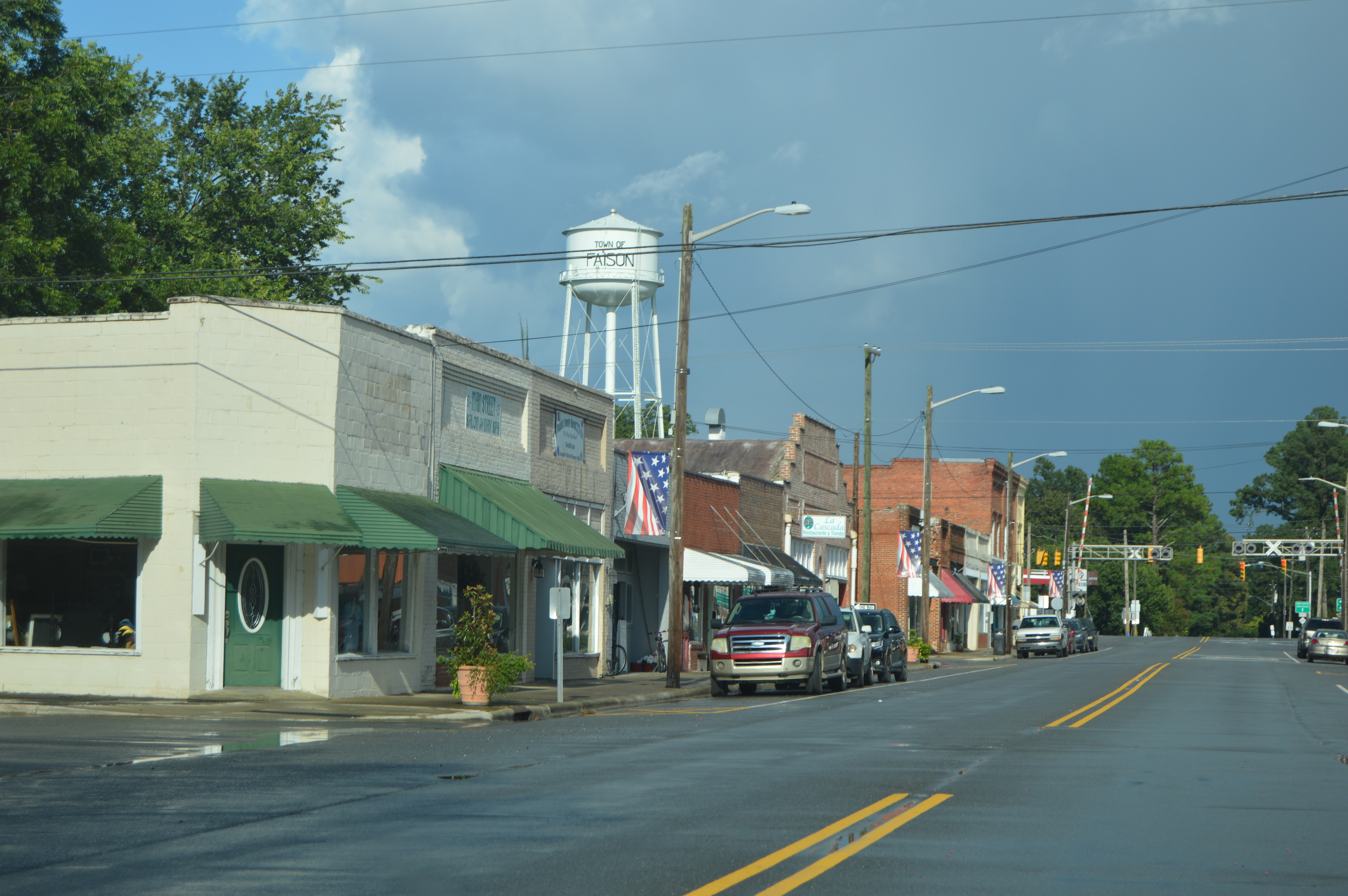
- Main Street

- Location within North Carolina Location within the United States
- Location: Roughly bounded by College, Hill, Solomon, and Ellis Sts., Faison, North Carolina
- Coordinates: 35°06′58″N 78°08′16″W
- Area: 69 acres (28 ha)
- Built: 1840
- Architectural style: Italianate, Queen Anne, Greek Revival
- MPS: Duplin County MPS
- NRHP reference No.: 96001550
- Added to NRHP: January 2, 1997

Faison Historic District is a national historic district located at Faison, Duplin County, North Carolina. The district encompasses 116 contributing buildings, 2 contributing structures, and 1 contributing object in the central business district and surrounding residential area of Faison. It includes industrial, residential, and commercial buildings with notable examples of Greek Revival, Queen Anne, and Italianate style architecture. Notable buildings include the Cates Pickle Company (1931), Moore Lee Thornton Store (c. 1850-1870), C. S. Hines Store (c. 1900), Clifton's Service Station (1933), The Walter Livingston Hicks House (C. 1880), Faison Pharmacy, Witherington Building (1915), Faison Depot (1888), Presbyterian Church (1918), Elias Faison House (c. 1850), Faison-Williams House (1853), and Witherington House (1880).

It was added to the National Register of Historic Places in 1997.
