= W. Stokes Boney House =

Historic house in North Carolina, United States

- U.S. National Register of Historic Places
- Location within North Carolina Location within the United States
- Location: 651 E. Southerland St., Wallace, North Carolina
- Coordinates: 34°44′31″N 77°59′09″W
- Area: 17.8 acres (7.2 ha)
- Built: 1878–1890; 136 years ago
- Built by: W. Stokes Boney, George Blanton
- Architectural style: Greek Revival
- MPS: Duplin County MPS
- NRHP reference No.: 99000812
- Added to NRHP: July 8, 1999

W. Stokes Boney House is a historic house located at 651 East Southerland Street in Wallace, Duplin County, North Carolina. It is locally significant as a highly unusual two-story frame house notable for the eighteen-degree inward bend of the prominent side gabled main block.

== Description and history ==
It was built between 1878 and 1890 by mill owner and farmer W. Stokes Boney, and is a two-story, Greek Revival style wood-frame dwelling with a side gable roof and 18 degree inward bend. The house features a full-width, double-tiered engaged porch. Also on the property are the contributing smokehouse (c. 1850) and grape arbor (1890).

It was listed on the National Register of Historic Places on July 8, 1999.
