= Waterloo (Albertson, North Carolina) =

Historic house in North Carolina, United States

- U.S. National Register of Historic Places
- Location within North Carolina Location within the United States
- Location: 2 miles (3.2 km) south of Albertson on NC 111, near Albertson, North Carolina
- Coordinates: 35°5′12″N 77°48′55″W
- Area: 9 acres (3.6 ha)
- Built: 1806
- Architectural style: Federal
- NRHP reference No.: 75001254
- Added to NRHP: January 8, 1975

Waterloo, also known as Grady House, is a historic plantation house located near Albertson, Duplin County, North Carolina. It was built about 1806, and is a two-story, three bay by two bay, Federal style frame dwelling. It sits on a brick pier foundation and has a steep gable roof. The house is surrounded on three sides by a one-story enclosed shed. Also on the property is a contributing two-room outbuilding.

It was listed on the National Register of Historic Places in 1975.
