= Isaac M. Powers House =

Historic house in North Carolina, United States

- U.S. National Register of Historic Places
- Location within North Carolina Location within the United States
- Location: NC 1154, 0.8 miles (1.3 km) south of the junction of NC 1154 and NC 4, near Wallace, North Carolina
- Coordinates: 34°44′1″N 78°2′1″W
- Area: 3 acres (1.2 ha)
- Built: c. 1878
- Built by: Isaac Murray Powers
- Architectural style: Greek Revival
- MPS: Duplin County MPS
- NRHP reference No.: 99000461
- Added to NRHP: April 15, 1999

Isaac M. Powers House is a historic home located at Wallace, Duplin County, North Carolina. It was built about 1878, and is a one-story, single pile, three bay, frame dwelling with Greek Revival style design elements. A former rear ell was destroyed by fire in 1979. Also on the property are the contributing smokehouse. It was the home of Reverend Isaac Powers (1850-1936), one of the first African-American landowners in Duplin County.

It was listed on the National Register of Historic Places in 1999.
