= Joshua James Blanchard House =

Historic house in North Carolina, United States

- U.S. National Register of Historic Places
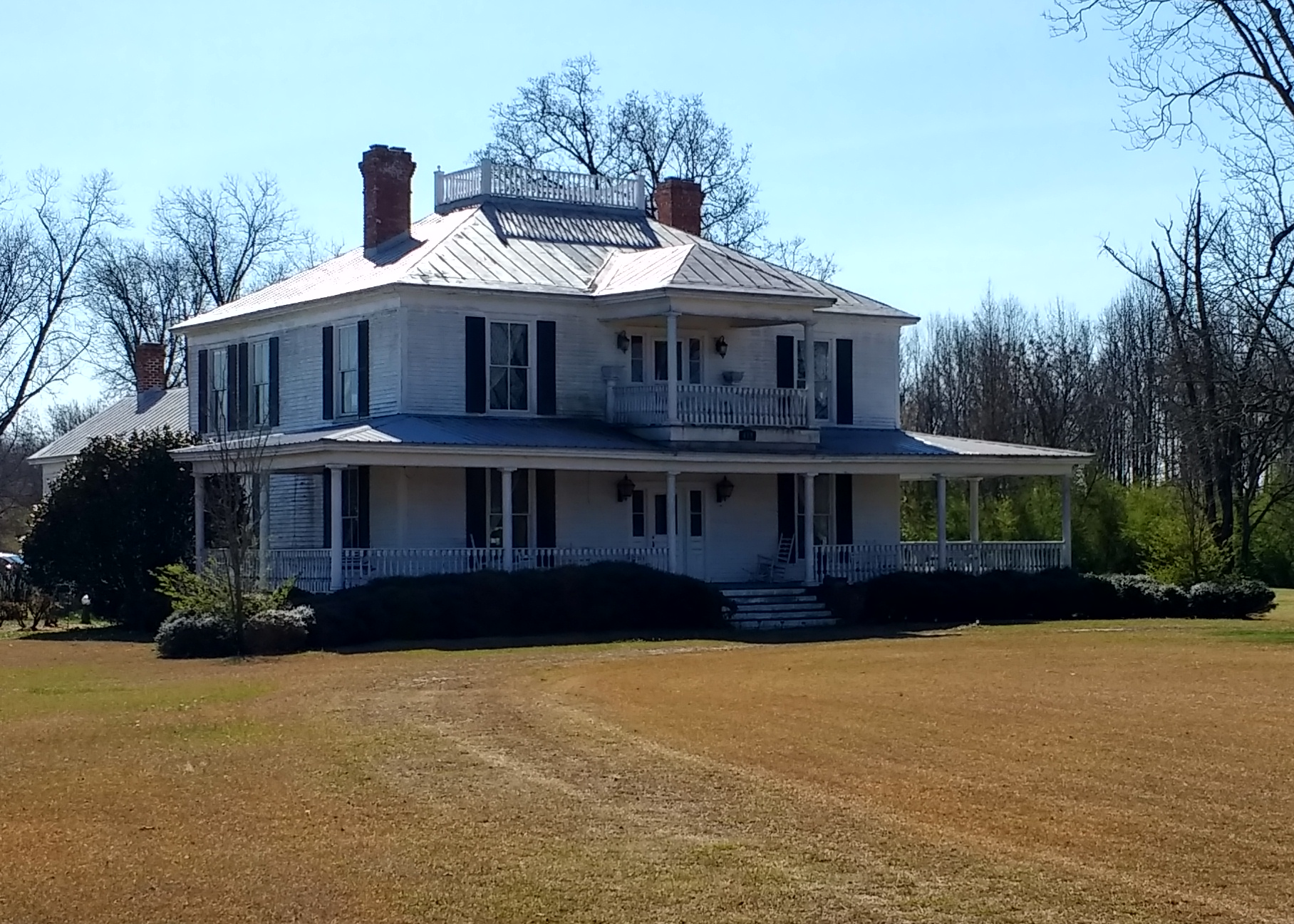

- Location within North Carolina Location within the United States
- Location: 415 Carrolls Road, near Warsaw, North Carolina
- Coordinates: 34°58′31″N 78°09′03″W
- Area: 5.31 acres (2.15 ha)
- Built: c. 1898
- Architectural style: Greek Revival
- MPS: Duplin County MPS
- NRHP reference No.: 12000572
- Added to NRHP: August 28, 2012

The Joshua James Blanchard House (also known as the William A. Blanchard House) is a historic house located at 415 Carrolls Road near Warsaw, Duplin County, North Carolina.

== Description and history ==
It was built about 1898 in the Greek Revival style, and is a two-story, hipped-roof structure with a timber-frame and a one-story gabled-roof kitchen wing. It features a one-story hipped-roof wraparound porch.

It was added to the National Register of Historic Places on August 28, 2012.
