= Faison, North Carolina =

- Town
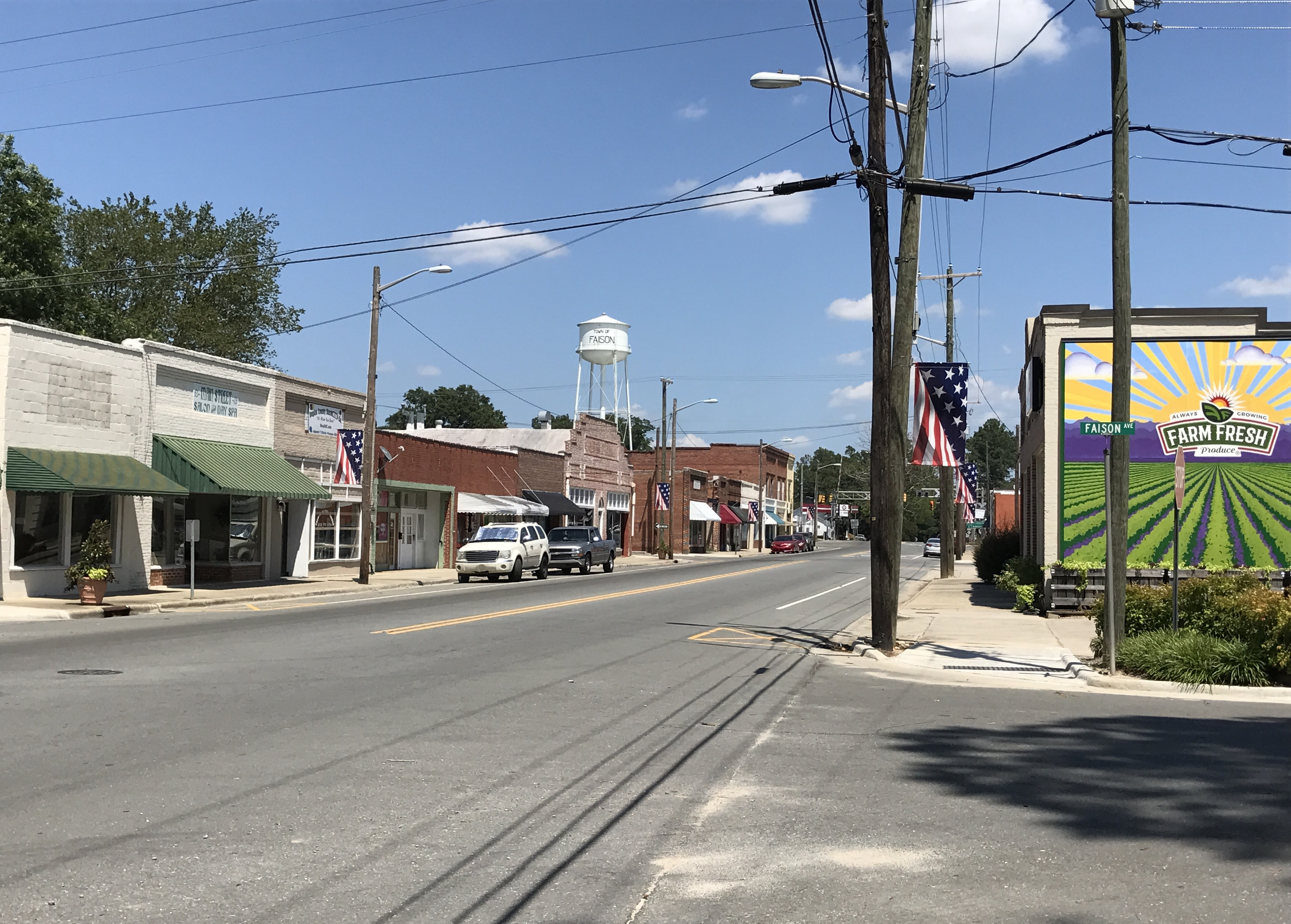
- West Main Street in Faison

- Flag Seal

- Location within the state of North Carolina
- Coordinates: 35°06′59″N 78°08′11″W
- Country: United States
- State: North Carolina
- Counties: Duplin, Sampson

Area
  - Total: 0.86 sq mi (2.24 km^{2})
  - Land: 0.86 sq mi (2.24 km^{2})
  - Water: 0 sq mi (0.00 km^{2})
- Elevation: 161 ft (49 m)

Population (2020)
  - Total: 784
  - Density: 905.6/sq mi (349.66/km^{2})
- Time zone: UTC-5 (Eastern (EST))
  - Summer (DST): UTC-4 (EDT)
- ZIP code: 28341
- Area codes: 910, 472
- FIPS code: 37-22560
- GNIS feature ID: 2406482
- Website: faisonnc.org

Faison is a town in Duplin and Sampson counties, North Carolina, United States. At the 2020 census, the population was 784.

== History ==
Faison was originally called "Faison's Depot", and under the latter name was founded around 1833. The town was named for Henry Faison, the original owner of the town site. A post office has been in operation at Faison since 1838.

The Faison Cemetery, Faison Historic District, Buckner Hill House, and John Wesley Mallard House are listed on the National Register of Historic Places.

== Geography ==
Faison is located in northwestern Duplin County. Two small parcels of land that are part of the town are located 3 miles (5 km) to the west of the rest of the town in Sampson County, next to Interstate 40. U.S. Route 117 passes through the center of town, leading northeast 3 miles (5 km) to Calypso and 21 miles (34 km) to Goldsboro, and south 8 miles (13 km) to Warsaw. North Carolina Highway 403 leads west 3 miles (5 km) to Interstate 40 at Exit 355.

According to the United States Census Bureau, the town of Faison has a total area of 0.77 square miles (2.0 km^{2}), all land.

== Demographics ==
Historical population
Census	Pop.	Note	%±
1890	256		—
1900	308		20.3%
1910	519		68.5%
1920	477		−8.1%
1930	589		23.5%
1940	751		27.5%
1950	768		2.3%
1960	666		−13.3%
1970	598		−10.2%
1980	636		6.4%
1990	701		10.2%
2000	744		6.1%
2010	961		29.2%
2020	784		−18.4%
U.S. Decennial Census

=== 2020 census ===
Faison racial composition
Race	Number	Percentage
White (non-Hispanic)	283	36.1%
Black or African American (non-Hispanic)	115	14.67%
Native American	5	0.64%
Other/Mixed	36	4.59%
Hispanic or Latino	345	44.01%

As of the 2020 United States census, there were 784 people, 401 households, and 273 families residing in the town.

=== 2000 census ===
As of the census of 2000, there were 736 people, 316 households, and 136 families residing in the town. The population density was 888.2 inhabitants per square mile (342.9/km^{2}). There were 354 housing units at an average density of 422.6 units per square mile (163.2 units/km^{2}). The racial makeup of the town was 64.11% White, 14.78% African American, 0.13% Native American, 20.30% from other races, and 0.67% from two or more races. Hispanic or Latino of any race were 24.73% of the population.

There were 314 households, out of which 27.7% had children under the age of 18 living with them, 43.9% were married couples living together, 11.5% had a female householder with no husband present, and 37.3% were non-families. 33.4% of all households were made up of individuals, and 15.9% had someone living alone who was 65 years of age or older. The average household size was 2.36 and the average family size was 2.93.

In the town, the population was spread out, with 22.6% under the age of 18, 9.8% from 18 to 24, 30.5% from 25 to 44, 20.4% from 45 to 64, and 16.7% who were 65 years of age or older. The median age was 37 years. For every 100 females, there were 95.8 males. For every 100 females age 18 and over, there were 94.6 males.

The median income for a household in the town was $22,788, and the median income for a family was $30,724. Males had a median income of $25,536 versus $20,667 for females. The per capita income for the town was $12,558. About 18.7% of families and 27.5% of the population were below the poverty line, including 26.0% of those under age 18 and 24.3% of those age 65 or over.

== Notable people ==
- James W. Blanchard, rear admiral in the U.S. Navy, submarine commander during World War II, Navy Cross recipient
- Samson L. Faison, U.S. Army brigadier general in World War I, born in Faison
- John Sprunt Hill, banker
- Betty Ray McCain, North Carolina Secretary of Culture
- William E. Thornton, astronaut, medical doctor, inventor, also nephew of James W. Blanchard
