= John M. Faison =

American politician

- Faison in 1890

Member of the U.S. House of Representatives from North Carolina's 3rd district
- In office March 4, 1911 – March 3, 1915
- Preceded by: Charles R. Thomas
- Succeeded by: George E. Hood

Personal details
- Born: John Miller Faison; April 17, 1862 Duplin County, North Carolina
- Died: April 21, 1915 (aged 53) Faison, North Carolina
- Cause of death: Gunshot
- Party: Democratic
- Education: Davidson College
- Occupation: Physician, politician

John Miller Faison (April 17, 1862 – April 21, 1915) was a United States representative from North Carolina.

== Biography ==
John M. Faison was born near Faison, North Carolina on April 17, 1862. He attended Faison Male Academy, and was graduated from Davidson College, North Carolina, in 1883; studied medicine at the University of Virginia at Charlottesville; completed a postgraduate medical course at New York Polyclinic in 1885, and commenced practice at Faison, N.C., the same year; also engaged in agricultural pursuits; member of the State and county Democratic executive committee 1898-1906; member of the North Carolina Jamestown Exposition Commission; elected as a Democrat to the Sixty-second and Sixty-third Congresses (March 4, 1911 – March 3, 1915); was not a candidate for reelection in 1914. He died from a gunshot wound under mysterious circumstances in Faison, N.C., April 21, 1915. He was interred in Faison Cemetery.

Faison was one of five candidates for the Democratic nomination in 1910, including the incumbent, Charles R. Thomas. After 446 ballots in which no candidate received the necessary majority, Dr. Faison was nominated on the 447th ballot.

== Bibliography ==
- United States Congress. "John M. Faison (id: F000008)". Biographical Directory of the United States Congress.

U.S. House of Representatives
Preceded by Charles R. Thomas	Member of the U.S. House of Representatives from North Carolina's 3rd congressional district 1911-1915	Succeeded by George E. Hood
