= William Wright Faison House =

Historic house in North Carolina, United States

- U.S. National Register of Historic Places
- Location within North Carolina Location within the United States
- Location: NC 1304, 0.2 miles (0.32 km) southeast of the junction with NC 1354, near Bowdens, North Carolina
- Coordinates: 35°4′51″N 78°3′35″W
- Area: 1.2 acres (0.49 ha)
- Built: 1830
- Architectural style: Greek Revival, Federal
- MPS: Duplin County MPS
- NRHP reference No.: 04001390
- Added to NRHP: December 23, 2004

William Wright Faison House, also known as Friendship Plantation, is a historic plantation house located near Bowdens, Duplin County, North Carolina. It was built about 1852, and is a two-story, three bay by two bay, Greek Revival style frame dwelling. It features a tall portico supported by four paneled posts added about 1848. Also on the property is a contributing one-story school building (c. 1830). The house was the seat of a 3,500 acre plantation amassed by William Wright Faison before the American Civil War.

It was listed on the National Register of Historic Places in 2004.
