= Warsaw, North Carolina =

- Town
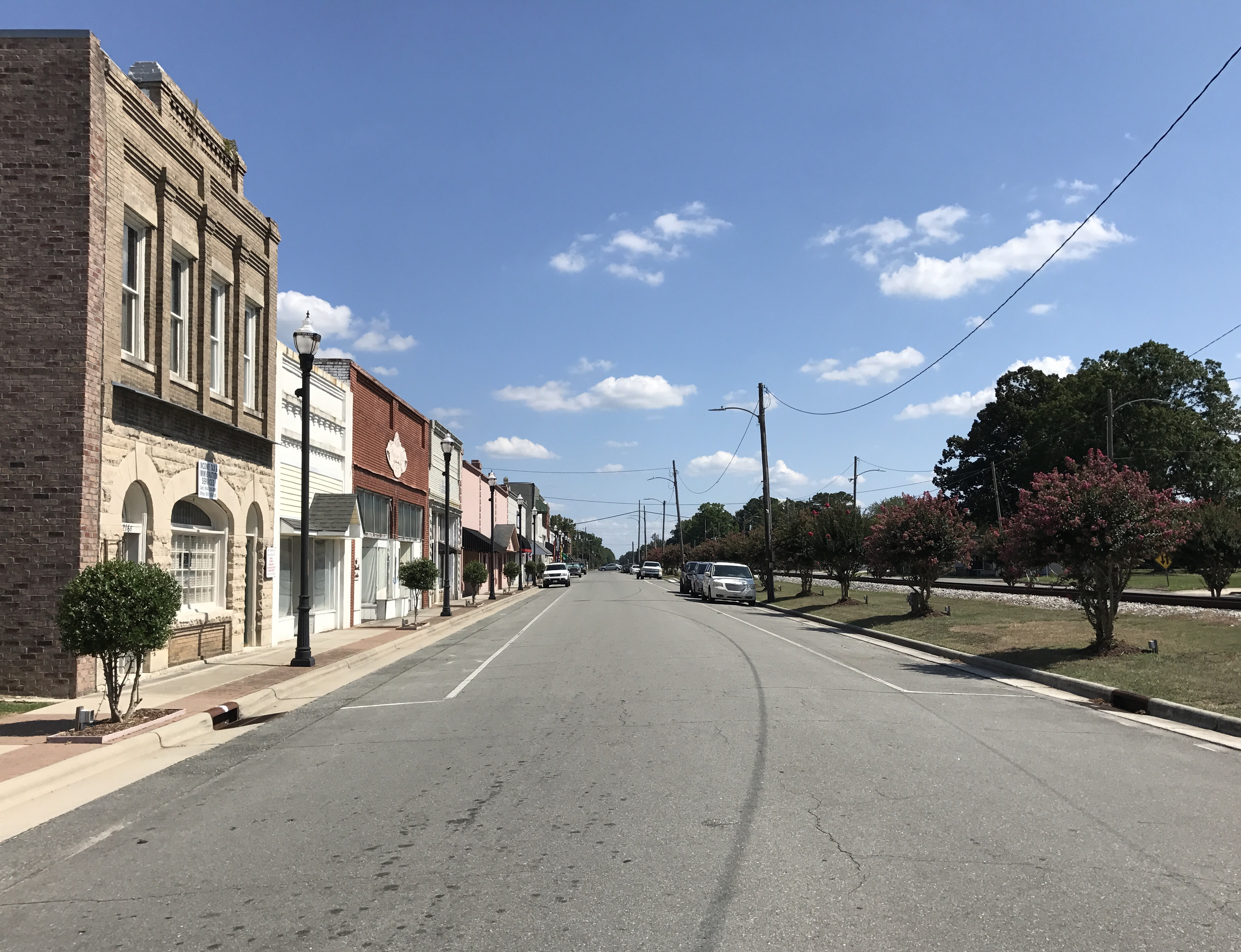
- Front Street

- Flag Seal

- Location within the state of North Carolina Warsaw (the United States)
- Coordinates: 35°00′22″N 78°05′36″W
- Country: United States
- State: North Carolina
- County: Duplin
- Named for: the setting of Thaddeus of Warsaw

Area
  - Total: 3.22 sq mi (8.33 km^{2})
  - Land: 3.22 sq mi (8.33 km^{2})
  - Water: 0 sq mi (0.00 km^{2})
- Elevation: 154 ft (47 m)

Population (2020)
  - Total: 2,733
  - Density: 849.9/sq mi (328.14/km^{2})
- Time zone: UTC-5 (Eastern (EST))
  - Summer (DST): UTC-4 (EDT)
- ZIP code: 28398
- Area codes: 910, 472
- FIPS code: 37-71160
- GNIS feature ID: 2406833
- Website: www.townofwarsawnc.com

Warsaw is a town in Duplin County, North Carolina, United States. At the 2020 census, the population was 2,733.

== History ==
The Warsaw Historic District and Joshua James Blanchard House are listed on the National Register of Historic Places.

== Geography ==
Warsaw is located in western Duplin County. U.S. Route 117 passes through the center of town as Pine Street; it leads north 30 miles (48 km) to Goldsboro and south 19 miles (31 km) to Wallace. North Carolina Highway 50 (Memorial Drive) intersects US 117 at the north end of town and leads east 8 miles (13 km) to Kenansville, the Duplin County seat. Interstate 40 passes to the south and west of Warsaw, with access from Exit 369 (US 117, 3.5 miles (5.6 km) south of the center of town) and Exit 364 (NC 24, 2.5 miles (4.0 km) west of the town center).

According to the United States Census Bureau, the town has a total area of 3.1 square miles (7.9 km^{2}), all land.

== Demographics ==
Historical population
Census	Pop.	Note	%±
1880	182		—
1890	401		120.3%
1900	576		43.6%
1910	723		25.5%
1920	1,108		53.3%
1930	1,222		10.3%
1940	1,483		21.4%
1950	1,598		7.8%
1960	2,221		39.0%
1970	2,701		21.6%
1980	2,910		7.7%
1990	2,859		−1.8%
2000	3,051		6.7%
2010	3,054		0.1%
2020	2,733		−10.5%
U.S. Decennial Census

=== 2020 census ===
Warsaw racial composition
Race	Number	Percentage
White (non-Hispanic)	652	23.86%
Black or African American (non-Hispanic)	1,497	54.77%
Native American	5	0.18%
Asian	19	0.7%
Other/Mixed	60	2.2%
Hispanic or Latino	500	18.29%

As of the 2020 census, Warsaw had a population of 2,733. The median age was 39.0 years. 25.8% of residents were under the age of 18 and 18.0% of residents were 65 years of age or older. For every 100 females there were 81.4 males, and for every 100 females age 18 and over there were 73.0 males age 18 and over.

0.0% of residents lived in urban areas, while 100.0% lived in rural areas.

There were 1,095 households in Warsaw, and there were 547 families residing in the town. Of those households, 34.5% had children under the age of 18 living in them. Of all households, 28.1% were married-couple households, 17.3% were households with a male householder and no spouse or partner present, and 48.7% were households with a female householder and no spouse or partner present. About 35.1% of all households were made up of individuals and 16.6% had someone living alone who was 65 years of age or older.

There were 1,394 housing units, of which 21.4% were vacant. The homeowner vacancy rate was 2.1% and the rental vacancy rate was 5.8%.

=== 2000 census ===
As of the census of 2000, there were 3,051 people, 1,187 households, and 777 families residing in the town. The population density was 1,093.0 inhabitants per square mile (422.0/km^{2}). There were 1,331 housing units at an average density of 476.8 per square mile (184.1/km^{2}). The racial makeup of the town was 35.89% White, 50.54% African American, 0.23% Native American, 0.10% Asian, 0.59% Pacific Islander, 11.86% from other races, and 0.79% from two or more races. Hispanic or Latino of any race were 15.77% of the population.

There were 1,187 households, out of which 31.6% had children under the age of 18 living with them, 38.3% were married couples living together, 23.3% had a female householder with no husband present, and 34.5% were non-families. 31.3% of all households were made up of individuals, and 13.9% had someone living alone who was 65 years of age or older. The average household size was 2.47 and the average family size was 3.06.

In the town, the population was spread out, with 27.1% under the age of 18, 10.0% from 18 to 24, 26.5% from 25 to 44, 19.3% from 45 to 64, and 17.1% who were 65 years of age or older. The median age was 34 years. For every 100 females, there were 85.5 males. For every 100 females age 18 and over, there were 79.7 males.

The median income for a household in the town was $23,358, and the median income for a family was $27,473. Males had a median income of $20,859 versus $19,861 for females. The per capita income for the town was $12,476. About 24.3% of families and 30.9% of the population were below the poverty line, including 36.7% of those under age 18 and 26.1% of those age 65 or over.

== Notable people ==
- Lucile Aycock McKee (1919—2013), president of the Junior League of Raleigh
