= Chollas Creek =

Chollas Creek Las Chollas Creek
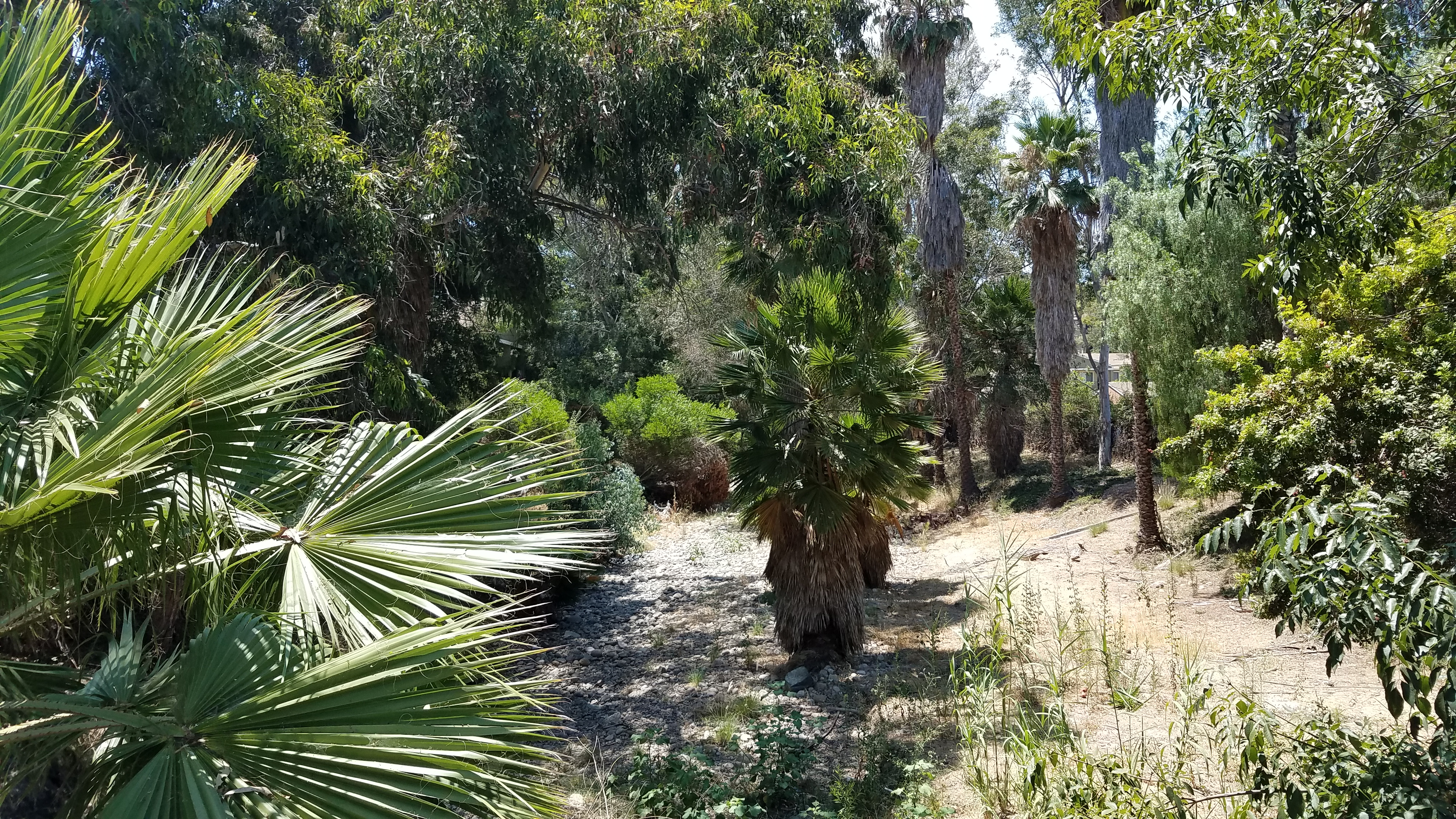
- The South fork of Chollas Creek, just west of 47th Street, in the Lincoln Park neighborhood of San Diego.
- Native name: Matt Xtaat (Kumiai)

Physical characteristics
- Mouth: San Diego Bay
  - location: (Just NW from the NW corner of Norman Scott Rd, San Diego, CA 92136 USA)
  - coordinates: 32°41′15.5″N 117°07′44.8″W
  - elevation: 0.0 feet (0.0 m) above sea level
- Length: 30 miles (48 km)

Chollas Creek, also referred to as Las Chollas Creek, is an urban creek in San Diego County, California, United States, that is 30 miles (48 km) long. The Chollas Creek's four branches begin in the cities of Lemon Grove and La Mesa and empties into San Diego Bay at Barrio Logan. Bifurcating into two main forks, the creek may also be dry during the Southern California dry season. Multiple plant, animal, and aquatic wildlife species live in or around the creek, including the rare plants Juncus acutus leopoldii and Iva hayesiana, and the threatened Coastal California gnatcatcher.

The creek has existed prior to 1500 BC and was used by the Kumeyaay tribe, who had a village by the creek. By 1841, the Kumeyaay village was no longer present. The creek has flooded numerous times, displacing nearby residents. Portions of the creek have been armored or channelized. A dam was constructed on a tributary in the early 20th century, forming Chollas Reservoir. This reservoir led the United States Navy to construct the Chollas Heights Navy Radio Station to the north.

The Chollas Creek valley has been described as "one of San Diego's most neglected watersheds." For decades, the creek has been impacted by pollution, illegal littering, and destruction of natural habitats. The pollution levels are high enough that it is considered an "impaired" water body by the California Office of Environmental Health Hazard Assessment. Plans to renovate the creek into a regional park began in 2002 and were completed in 2021 by the City of San Diego.

== Geography ==
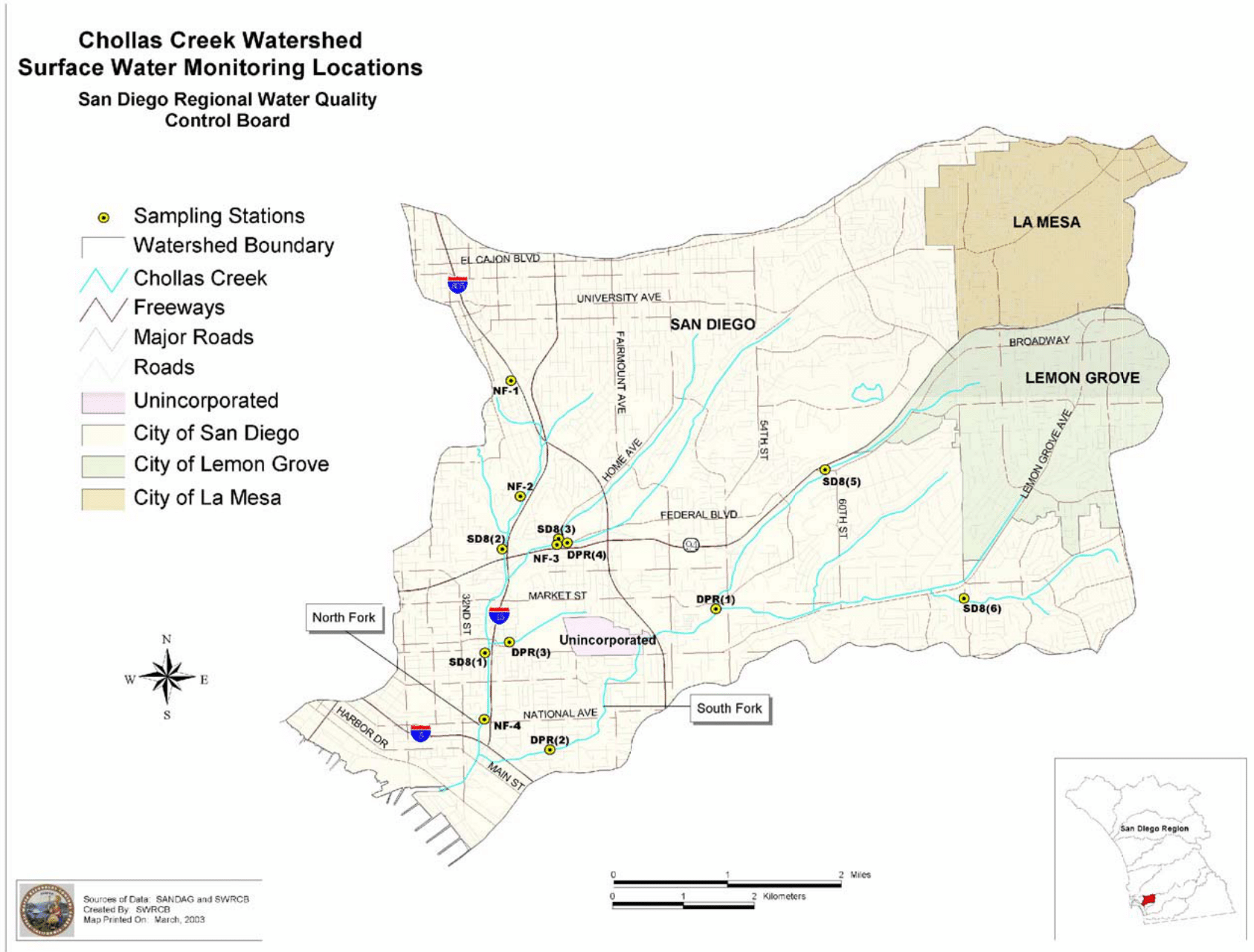
Chollas Creek watershed.

The Chollas Creek watershed extends from the cities of La Mesa and Lemon Grove, through much of San Diego (south of Interstate 8), and by an unincorporated area within San Diego County. It also runs through City Heights, Encanto, Barrio Logan, and eastern and southeastern San Diego. The highest elevation of the creek is within La Mesa at about 800 feet (240 m). The creek currently empties into San Diego Bay within Naval Station San Diego. The current mouth of Chollas Creek, is about 2,000 feet (0.61 km) west of the previous natural shoreline. Soils within the watershed are primarily of the Holocene-age, which overlay the older San Diego Formation, which was formed during the Pliocene-age. The La Nacion Fault System runs through the creek's watershed.

== Hydrology ==
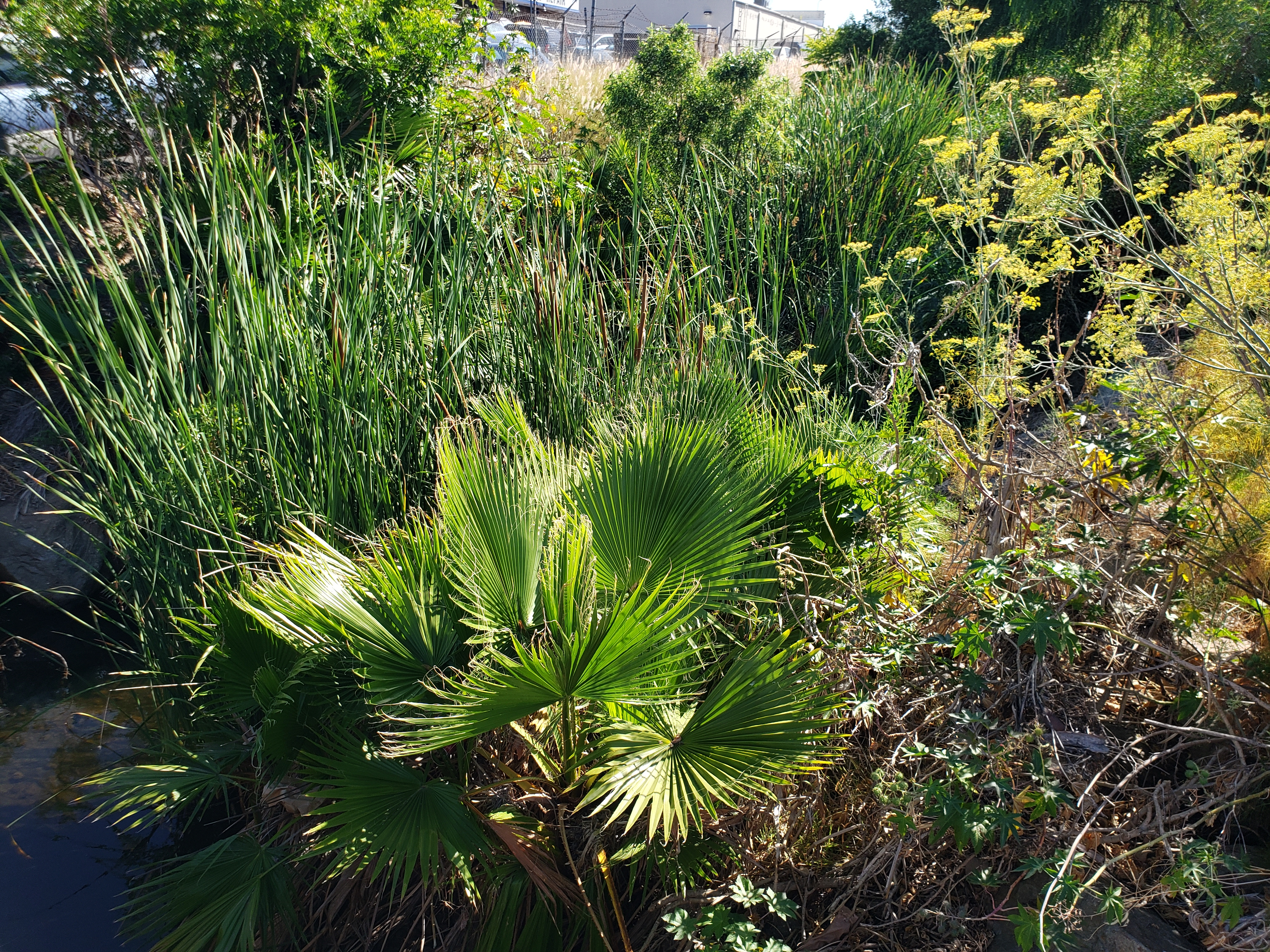
Chollas Creek north fork at Rolando Boulevard.

The watershed of Chollas Creek is 16,270 acres (65.8 km^{2}) in area, split into two main forks. (Note: Another sources states that the watershed is about 25.4 square miles (66 km^{2}).) The cumulative length of those two forks is 30 miles (48 km) linearly. The south fork watershed covers an area of 6,997 acres (28.32 km^{2}), and the north fork watershed covers an area of 9,276 acres (37.54 km^{2}). When rain does not fall within the creek's watershed the creek is usually dry minus urban runoff. Due to significant urbanization of the watershed, most of the existing soils within it are not very permeable. This leads to increased volume and velocity of water during storms, which in turn has resulted in erosion of land impacting habitat and existing infrastructure. The maximum discharge predicted from the creek when it goes under Main Street, near Naval Station San Diego, is 21,000 cubic feet (590 m^{3}) per second. Only a small portion of the watershed are tidelands, and fall under the jurisdiction of the Port of San Diego or the United States Navy. From May to September, Southern California's dry season, the creek may be dry or have very little flow. The mile of the creek closest to San Diego Bay is tidally influenced. The waters of Chollas Creek are polluted by multiple types of pollutants including copper, lead, and zinc.

== Flora and fauna ==
In the late 19th century, thickets of cactus as tall as nearly six feet high were noted in the valley created by the creek. Other species of plants observed growing abundantly included Arctostaphylos, Ceanothus, Eriodictyon californicum, Vitis girdiana, and Diplacus aurantiacus. By the late 20th century, species of plants found along the creek were Eriogonum fasciculatum, Salvia apiana, Quercus dumosa, Malosma, and Diplacus aurantiacus. In 2015, a study of the south fork of the creek, before it merged with the north fork, found two plant species with California Rare Plant Ranks: Juncus acutus leopoldii, and Iva hayesiana.

Wildlife that live around the creek can include coyotes, skunks, possums, and red-shouldered hawks. Other wildlife which might be found around the creek include desert cottontail, gray foxes, and big brown bats. Birds commonly found along Chollas Creek include the California gnatcatcher, red-tailed hawk, Bell's vireo, and cactus wren. Of these species, the Coastal California gnatcatcher is a threatened species. A study in 2015 at the mouth of Chollas Creek (in the area of a prehistoric manmade shell midden), found four species of bivalves and one species of gastropod. The most numerous bivalve was a species of Chione.

== History ==
Chollas Creek's existence is estimated to date back to at least 1500 BC, with a wetland environment dominating the mouth of the creek by 0 AD at the latest. At one point in its history, Chollas Creek had a confluence with the Sweetwater River, where these waters drained into the ocean through Silver Strand. By 1000 AD at the latest, a sandy beach was formed at the northwest mouth of the creek.

=== Native American history ===
Chollas Creek was used by the Kumeyaay prior to the arrival of the Spanish. A Kumeyaay community had existed near Chollas Creek, in Kumiai the village on Chollas Creek was named Matt Xtaat. The village appears on a 1782 map created by La Princesa navigator Don Juan Pantoja y Arriola labeled on the map as "Ranchería de las Choyas." By 1841, Eugène Duflot de Mofras noted that the village was no longer in existence. According to archeological surveys conducted in 2004 and 2006, the village was located between present-day Oceanview Boulevard in the north and National Avenue in the south, and between 31st Street in the west and 35th Street in the east. According to archeological research conducted in 2011, the area where the village was located was occupied in two distinct periods; one beginning over two thousand years before 2011, and another beginning as early as 1,771 years before 2011. The land that the village used to occupy is now largely occupied by single-family homes and apartment buildings.

=== Spanish era ===
During the Portola Expedition (1769–1770), a survey conducted by crew members of the San Antonio found that Chollas Creek was a viable water source. Despite this finding, it was not used due to the presence of the Kumeyaay community there. In 1769, Junípero Serra noted that the village at Chollas Creek was lined with cholla cacti. Although other Kumeyaay communities were involved in a November 1775 attack on Mission San Diego, Chollas was not involved. In the late 18th century, 71 people from Chollas were baptized.

=== United States era ===
==== 19th century ====
Stagecoaches traveled within the Chollas Creek watershed down what is now Federal Boulevard. In 1851, Army officer Nathaniel Lyon traveled east along the creek and established a route to what is now Campo, California. In the 1883–1884 rainy season, Southern California experienced record-setting rainfall. As of February 2023, it was the wettest rainy season in San Diego County, with almost 26 inches of rainfall. The rainfall caused the creek to expand to 120 feet wide at one point. In 1886, the National City and Otay Railroad built a track and crossing over the creek near the present-day alignment of Main Street to supply the construction of Sweetwater Dam. In 1887, a railroad track owned by the California Southern Railroad crossed over creek. In 1888, a railroad track owned by the Coronado Railroad crossed the creek near the present-day alignment of National Avenue.

==== 20th century ====
In 1901, the Chollas Reservoir was created on a tributary of the creek due to the construction of the Chollas Dam. Also known as the Chollas Heights Dam, the Chollas Dam is a 56 feet (17 m) tall earth-fill type dam with a steel core plate. When the reservoir was built, it was east of the city limits of San Diego, and was the terminus point of a water pipe from the Lower Otay Reservoir. Built by the Southern California Mountain Water Company, it and the rest of the company was purchased by the City of San Diego in 1913. Water from Chollas Reservoir was piped down to the University Heights Reservoir. For a period of time in 1917, due to storm damage to San Diego's water distribution system, the Chollas Reservoir was its sole source of water. In 1927 cracks developed in the dam, requiring repairs. The collapse of the St. Francis Dam led to the reassessment, modification, and improvement of other dams, including the capacity enlargement of the Chollas Reservoir. The Reservoir had had a water treatment plant, but it was decommissioned in 1950 due to the completion of the much larger water treatment plant at Lake Murray. In 1966 the reservoir was decommissioned and transferred to the City of San Diego Parks & Recreation Department, becoming Chollas Lake Park. In 1971 the lake was designated as a fishing lake for youth 15 and younger. The Chollas Lake is roughly 16 acres. In 1986, a Bactrocera dorsalis was caught in a trap near the lake. This has led to local eradication efforts against this invasive species

The Chollas Heights Navy Radio Station was built just north of Chollas Reservoir in 1916. Operated remotely from Point Loma, at the time of its creation it used the largest vacuum tube constructed, and required 50 US gallons (190 L) per minute to keep it cooled. The site was chosen so that the lake's water might cool the heated transmitter tubes. Three towers, each 660 feet (200 m) high, were constructed between February 1915 and January 26, 1916. It was the world's first global Navy Radio Transmitting Facility, broadcasting at 200,000 watts, and was the most powerful radio transmitter in North America at the time. It was built as one of a series of high-powered radio stations, including locations in Pearl Harbor, Cavite, and Annapolis. Beginning with the United States' entry into the Great War, additional changes were made to increase the security of the radio station and a company of Marines of the 5th Marine Regiment were stationed at Chollas Heights. The Marines departed the radio station in 1921. Efforts had been made to list the facility as a historic landmark. Some structures of the facility had been reused for other purposes and most historic parts of the facility were not saved. The station was closed in 1992 and demolished in 1994. Military housing was built on the site of the radio station. Branchinecta sandiegonensis, an endangered species, has been documented to have been found at the military housing at Chollas Heights.

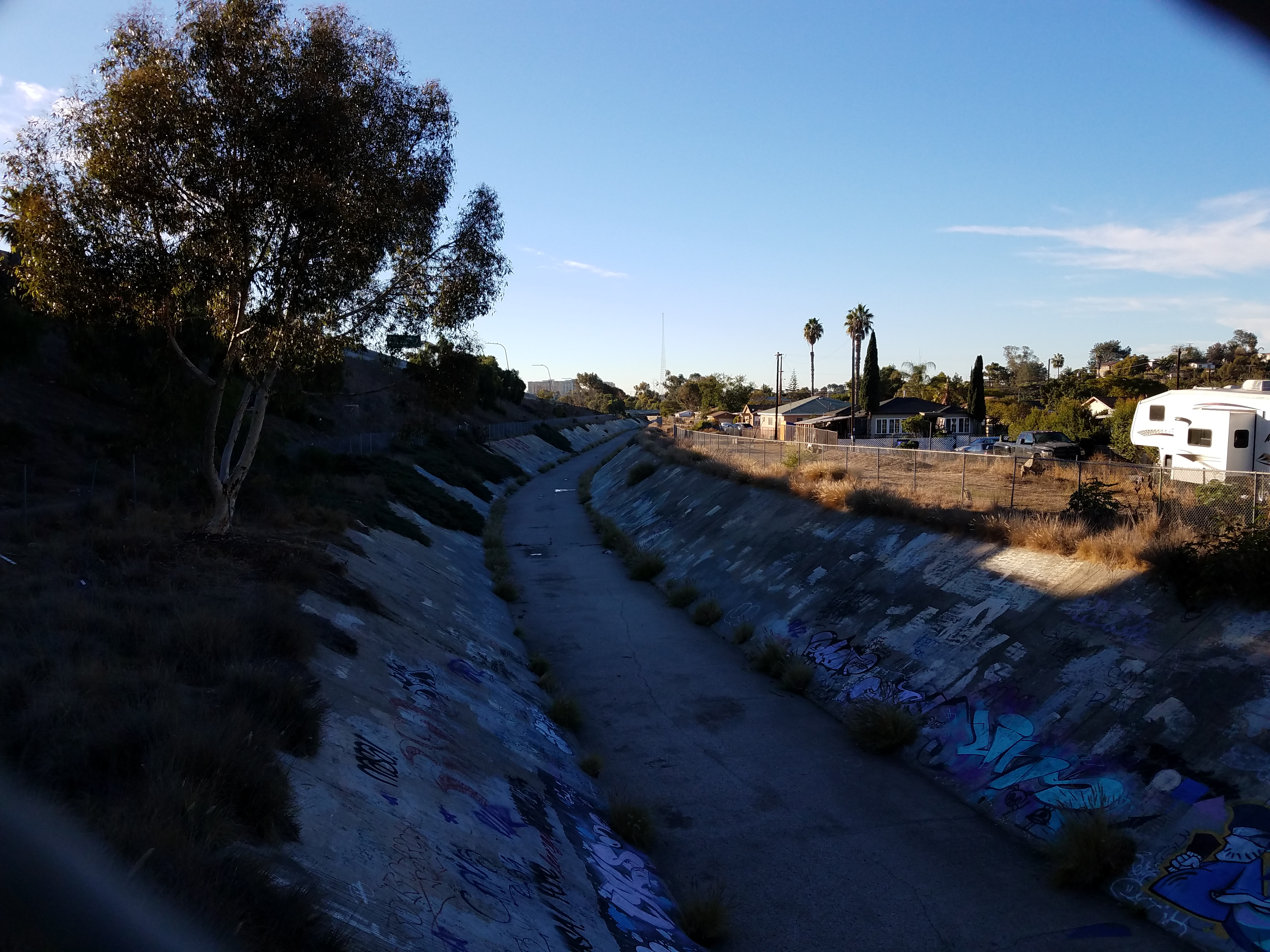
North fork of Chollas Creek in the Logan Heights neighborhood.

From the turn of the century, until at least 1930, an estuary existed at the mouth of the creek that measured at least 2,000 feet (610 m) across and expanded until the point where the north and south branches of the creeks met. In 1919, Naval Base San Diego was established. Soon after, land at the mouth of Chollas Creek was infilled, removing the existing wetlands. The creek was placed within a channel in order to prevent flooding of reclaimed lands that are part of the Navy base. In 1938, the course of the north fork was modified due to the construction of Wabash Boulevard. From 1946 until 1981, a burn site and landfill was operated by the City of San Diego within the watershed of Chollas Creek near Chollas reservoir. On New Year's Eve 1951, the creek went over its normal creekbanks impacting a dozen families. In the early 1960s, additional channeling of the creek occurred, with the goal of flood prevention. In 1969, flooding occurred in Chollas Creek leading to the collapse of a channeled portion of the creek near Oceanview Boulevard, along with damage to the Jackie Robinson YMCA. In 1978, a portion of the creek from its mouth to 0.35 miles (0.56 km) was designated as navigable waters. Additional extensive flooding caused damage along Chollas Creek in 1978 and 1979. Beginning in the late 1970s volunteers began to conduct vegetation clearing in the City Heights neighborhood to reduce fire potential within the canyons which the creek flows through . In 1999, Chollas Creek was added to the list of impaired waterbodies by the Regional Water Quality Control Board, San Diego Region, after it was found that stormwater samples contained organophosphate pesticides and heavy metals.

==== 21st century ====
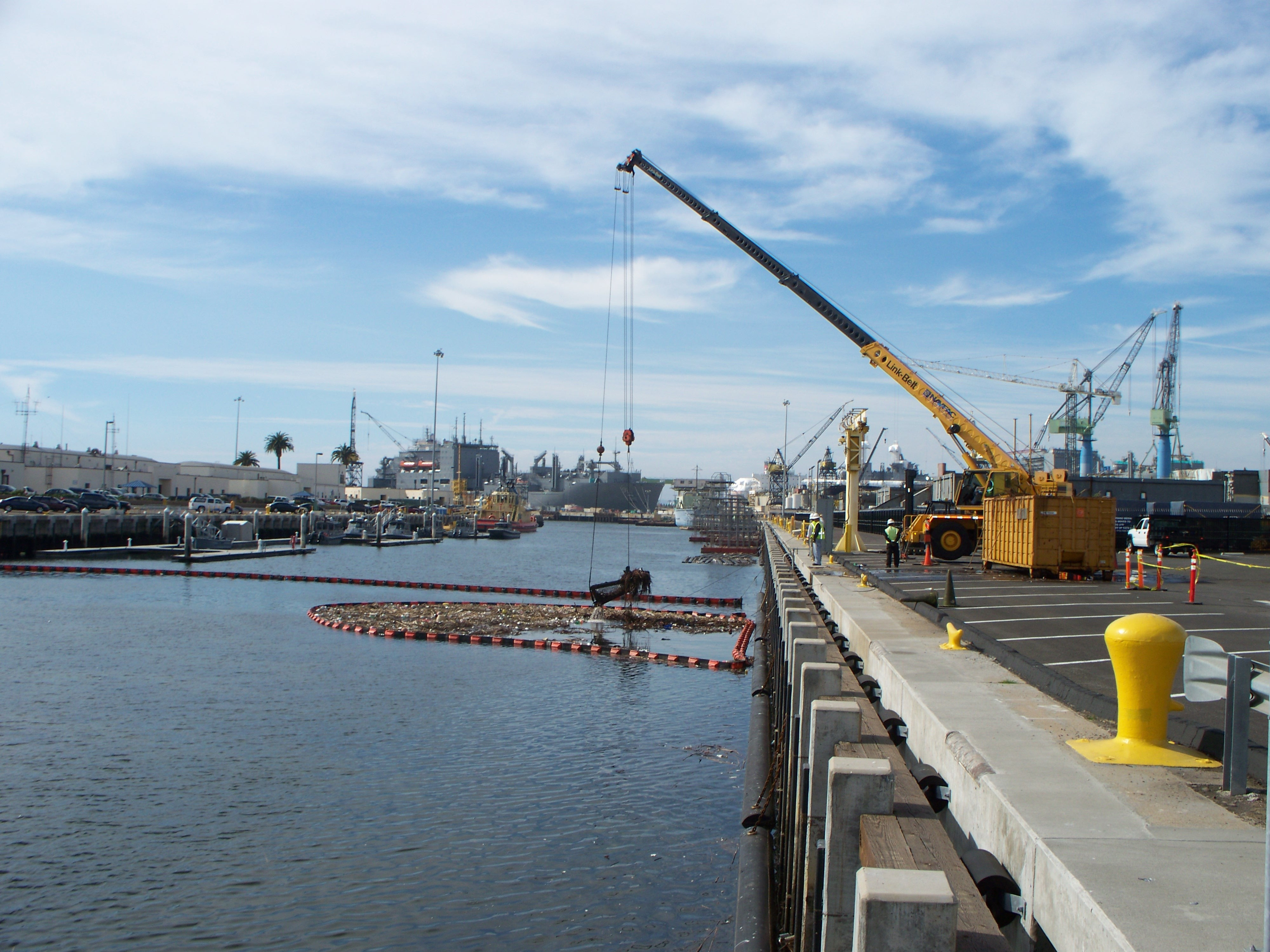
A crane lifts debris from a river, with military ships in the far background. In February 2010, after severe weather conditions caused debris buildup within the creek, Naval Base San Diego's Public Works crane and rigging crew collected over 40 tons of trash over four days.

In 2002, the City of San Diego adopted a 20-year, $42 million plan to rehabilitate the creek. That same year, the watershed of the creek had the highest population density of any watershed in San Diego County. In 2007, Groundworks was formed to cleanup Chollas Creek due to significant illegal dumping into the creek. By 2013, while most of the creek had been put within concrete channels or underground culverts, a small portion of the creek bed had been restored to a more natural soft channel on the south branch of the creek. In 2014, neighbors organized to reclaim a vacant lot in the watershed area for community use. A neighborhood group working with the San Diego Civic Innovation Lab and Groundwork San Diego cleared the lot. Improvements included "walking paths, native plant landscaping, mosaic art benches and shade structures". In 2015, microplastics were found in 1 in 4 fish caught and in the sediment at the mouth of Chollas Creek. In January 2016, Friends of Chollas Creek organized a clean up of the creek in the Oak Park neighborhood. Due to debris that flows down Chollas Creek, it ends up in Naval Base San Diego, its publics works is responsible for the debris removal; in 2017, 46.97 short tons (42,610 kg) worth of trash was removed from the creek within the navy base. In 2019, the California Natural Resources Agency gave a grant of $3.5 million to Groundworks San Diego, to help it restore the creek, through removing concrete channels and adding bike paths besides the creek.

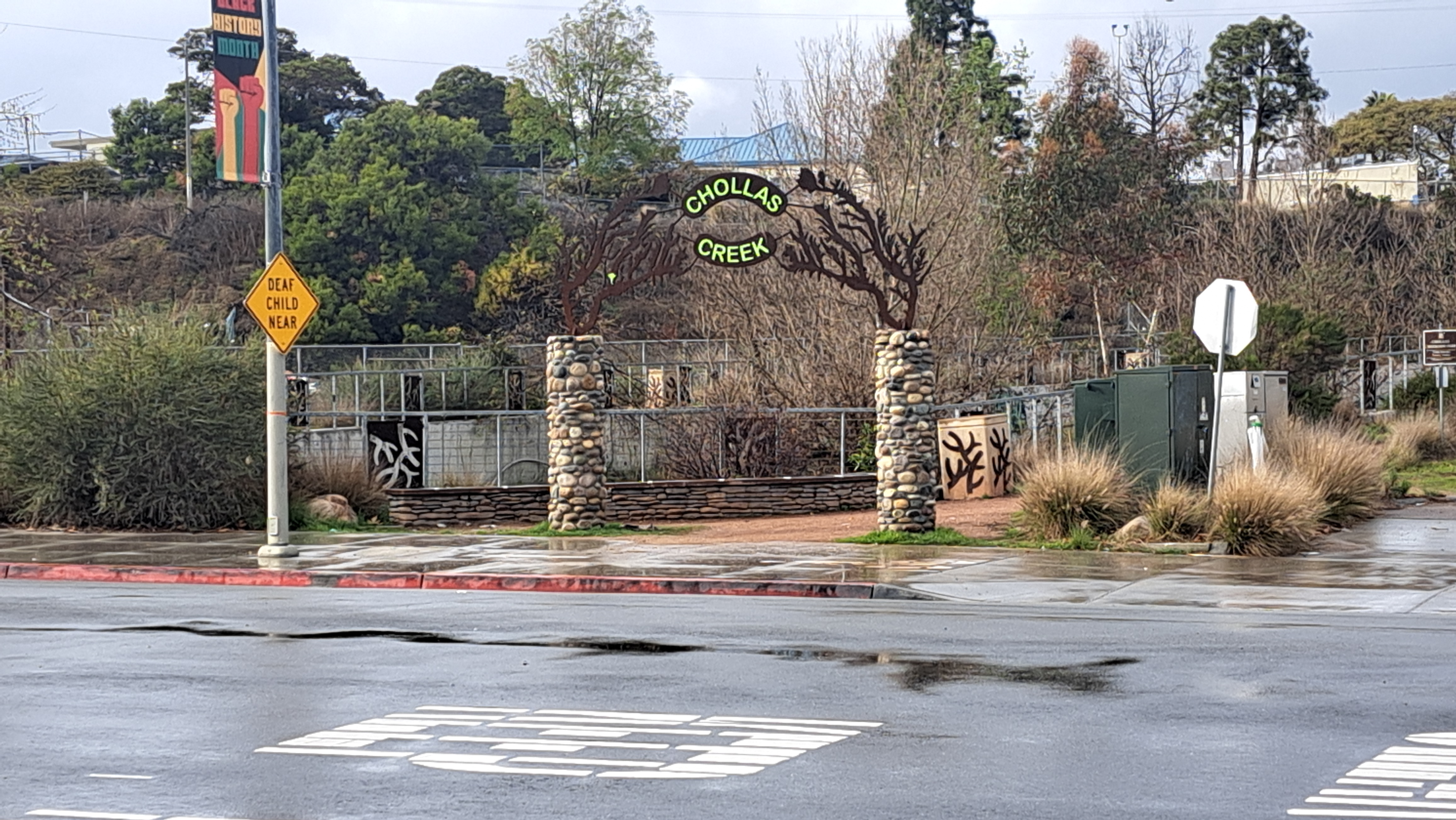
Chollas Creek Park Entrance in Lincoln Park

In June 2021, the City of San Diego declared that Chollas Creek would be made into a regional park. Because of the size and sprawl of the creek, it was decided that Chollas Creek Regional Park would be a loose collection of small parks, open canyons, trails and other recreational amenities. This was finalized in the August 2021 Parks Master Plan. Prior to this, Chollas Creek was the only major waterway in San Diego not to be designated a regional park. In late 2022, the California Coastal Commission approved repairs to the Las Chollas Creek Bridge, which dates back to 1907 and is used by the San Diego Trolley to cross the creek. In May 2023, Groundwork San Diego presented a plan to the San Diego City Council to create a series of trails along Chollas Creek. The Chollas Creek Regional Park is expected to be completed by 2024.

In January 2022, a California sea lion was found on California State Route 94, where bystander motorists and then California Highway Patrol officers, had to divert traffic until it was taken by SeaWorld San Diego personnel for assessment. One of the theories at the time was that he had traveled from San Diego Bay up Chollas Creek to Highway 94 – a route of 3.5 miles (5.6 km). The first time this particular sea lion required the assistance of SeaWorld personnel was in November 2021, when it had made its way away from the water onto Harbor Island Drive near San Diego International Airport. In February 2022, after the attachment of a flipper identification tag and rehabilitation, the sea lion was released into the ocean. In April 2022, the sea lion, who was given the name of Freeway, was found traveling up Chollas Creek in the Logan Heights neighborhood more than a mile away from ocean water, towards where he was found in January of that same year. After being recovered from Chollas Creek, the sea lion was retained at SeaWorld. In April 2023, the sea lion was euthanized at SeaWorld following deteriorating health due to a progressive disease.

In 2016, San Diego Fire-Rescue Department noted that Chollas Creek was at risk for flooding due to El Niño related storms. San Diego had a shortfall of funding for flood management; additionally, San Diego claimed that it lacked required permits to conduct debris clearing due the creek being protected and regulated wetlands. In 2019, the City of San Diego did not recommend maintenance of Chollas Creek's flood infrastructure. In 2022, before Tropical Storm Kay arrived to San Diego, an emergency declaration was made, and part of the Chollas Creek was cleared of vegetation and debris in the Southcrest and Shelltown neighborhoods, removing over 2,000 short tons (1,800,000 kg) worth of material.

On January 22, 2024, Chollas Creek overflowed its channeled creek bed; this occurred on the fourth heaviest rainfall day documented since 1850. Prior to the heavy rainfall day, the area of the overflow had not been maintained and had trash in the creek bed; When the creek overflowed its creek bed it caused the flooding of multiple homes and cars. Firefighters and lifeguards rescued hundreds from the flood, especially in the Southcrest neighborhood. Due to the flooding and flood damage along Chollas Creek and elsewhere, a state of emergency was declared. Shelters were opened by the Red Cross to assist those residents who were impacted by the flooding. A City of San Diego official later stated that the rains that occurred on January 22 exceeded the design of the stormwater channels within the Chollas Creek watershed. After the rains passed, work crews began to clear the culverts of Chollas Creek; the work falls within the emergency declaration.

== Fishing ==
The California Department of Fish and Wildlife tracks the stocking of fish to Chollas Park Lake, located on a tributary of Chollas Creek.

The available fish are as follows:

- Salmon (Anadromous and Inland)
- Bass (Striped Bass)
- Catfish
- Hatchery Trout
- Panfish
- Shad
- Steelhead
- Sturgeon
- Trout (wild, wild heritage, and hatchery)
