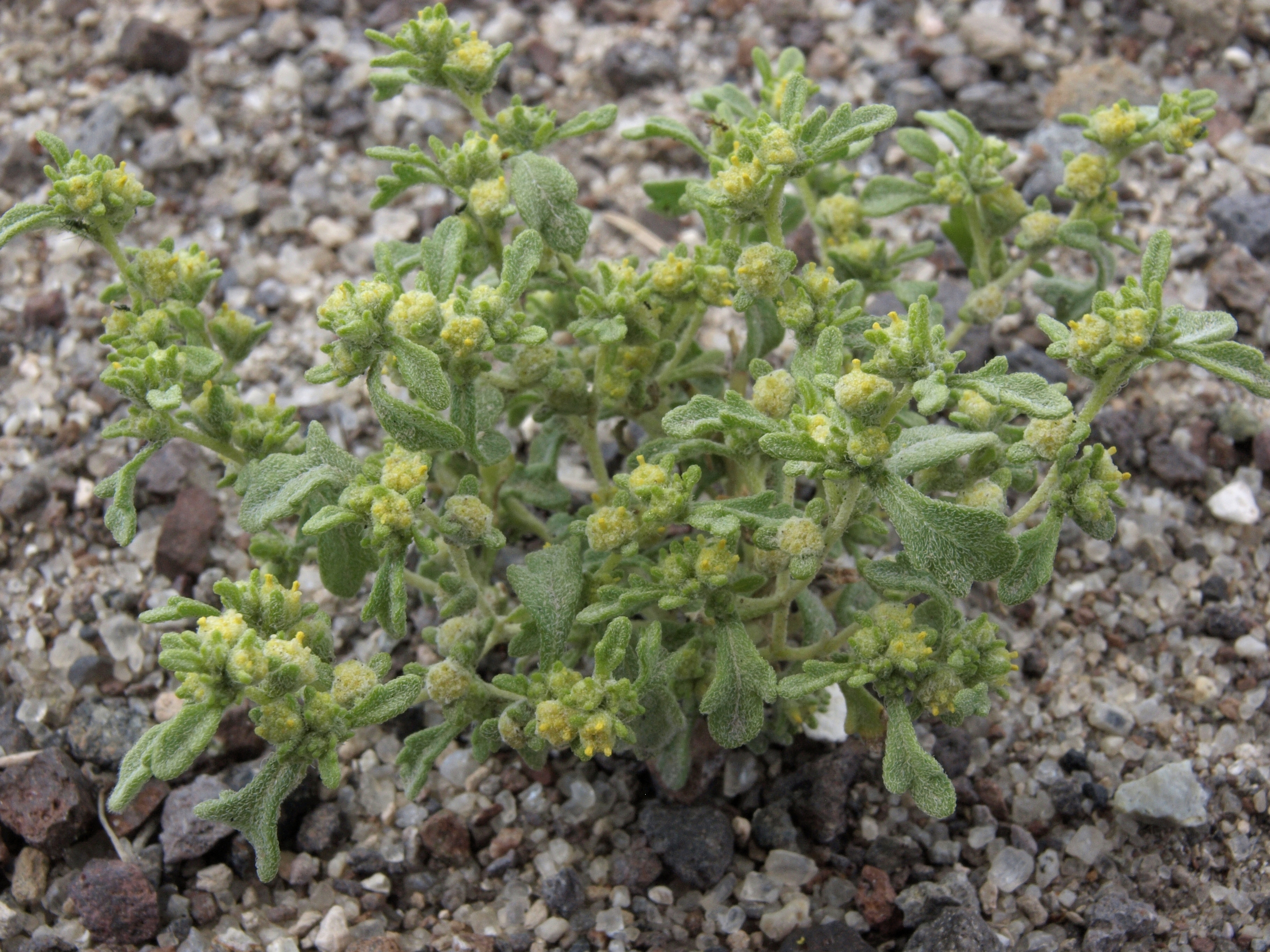
- Euphrosyne nevadensis

Scientific classification
- Kingdom: Plantae
- Clade: Embryophytes
- Clade: Tracheophytes
- Clade: Angiosperms
- Clade: Eudicots
- Clade: Asterids
- Order: Asterales
- Family: Asteraceae
- Subfamily: Asteroideae
- Tribe: Heliantheae
- Subtribe: Ambrosiinae
- Genus: Euphrosyne; DC.

Synonyms
- Iva sect. Chorisiva A.Gray; Chorisiva Rydb.; Euphrosinia Rchb.; Leuciva Rydb.; Oxytenia Nutt.

= Euphrosyne (plant) =

Genus of flowering plants

Euphrosyne is a genus of flowering plants in the family Asteraceae.

== Species ==
The following species are recognised in the genus Euphrosyne:

- Euphrosyne acerosa (Nutt.) Panero
- Euphrosyne dealbata (A.Gray) Panero
- Euphrosyne nevadensis (M.E.Jones) Panero
- Euphrosyne partheniifolia DC.

=== Species formerly included ===
The following species are now placed in other genera:

- Euphrosyne ambrosiifolia A.Gray, syn of Hedosyne ambrosiifolia (A.Gray) Strother
- Euphrosyne xanthiifolia (Fresen.) A.Gray, syn of Cyclachaena xanthiifolia (Nutt.) Fresen.
