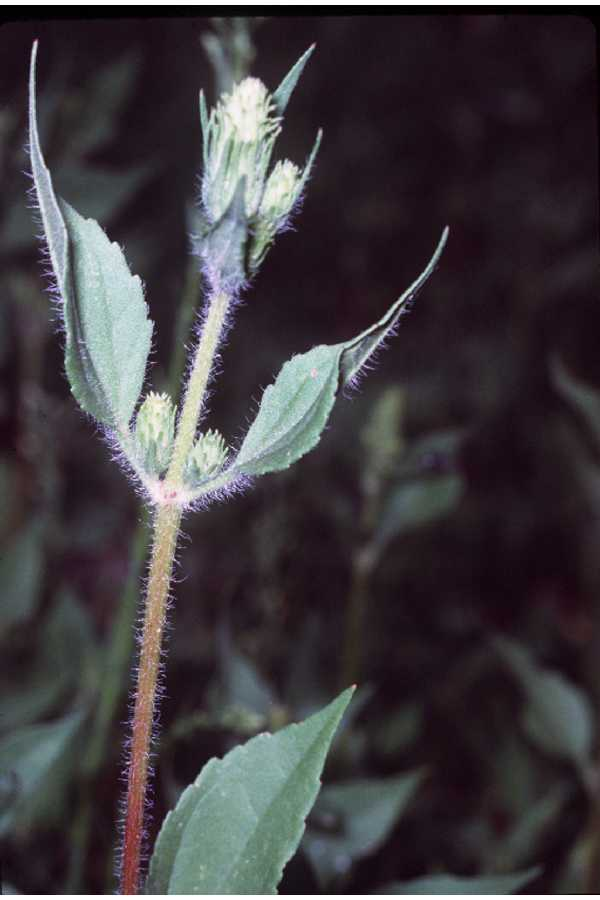
- Iva annua

Scientific classification
- Kingdom: Plantae
- Clade: Embryophytes
- Clade: Tracheophytes
- Clade: Angiosperms
- Clade: Eudicots
- Clade: Asterids
- Order: Asterales
- Family: Asteraceae
- Subfamily: Asteroideae
- Tribe: Heliantheae
- Subtribe: Ambrosiinae
- Genus: Iva; L. 1753 not Fabr. 1759 (Lamiaceae)

Type species
- Iva annua L.

= Iva (plant) =

Genus of flowering plants

Iva is a genus of wind-pollinated plants in the family Asteraceae, described as a genus by Linnaeus in 1753. Plants of this genus are known generally as marsh elders. The genus is native to North America.

Accepted species

- Iva angustifolia - southeastern + south-central United States (Texas Oklahoma Louisiana Arkansas Kansas Florida)
- Iva annua - United States, primarily south-central region; Tamaulipas
- Iva asperifolia - south-central United States (Texas Oklahoma Louisiana Arkansas Kansas Indiana), Veracruz
- Iva axillaris - western United States + Canada
- Iva cheiranthifolia - Cuba
- Iva corbinii B.L. Turner - Texas
- Iva dealbata - United States (Texas New Mexico), Mexico (Chihuahua, Coahuila, Nuevo León, San Luis Potosí)
- Iva frutescens - coastal areas from Texas to Nova Scotia
- Iva hayesiana - California, Baja California
- Iva imbricata - coastal areas from Texas to Virginia; Bahamas
- Iva microcephala - southeastern United States (Alabama Florida Georgia North Carolina South Carolina)
- Iva xanthiifolia (synonym Cyclachaena xanthiifolia) - widespread in United States + Canada, introduced elsewhere
