= Iva corbinii =

Scientific classification
- Kingdom: Plantae
- Clade: Tracheophytes
- Clade: Angiosperms
- Clade: Eudicots
- Clade: Asterids
- Order: Asterales
- Family: Asteraceae
- Genus: Iva
- Species: I. corbinii

Binomial name
- Iva corbinii B.L.Turner
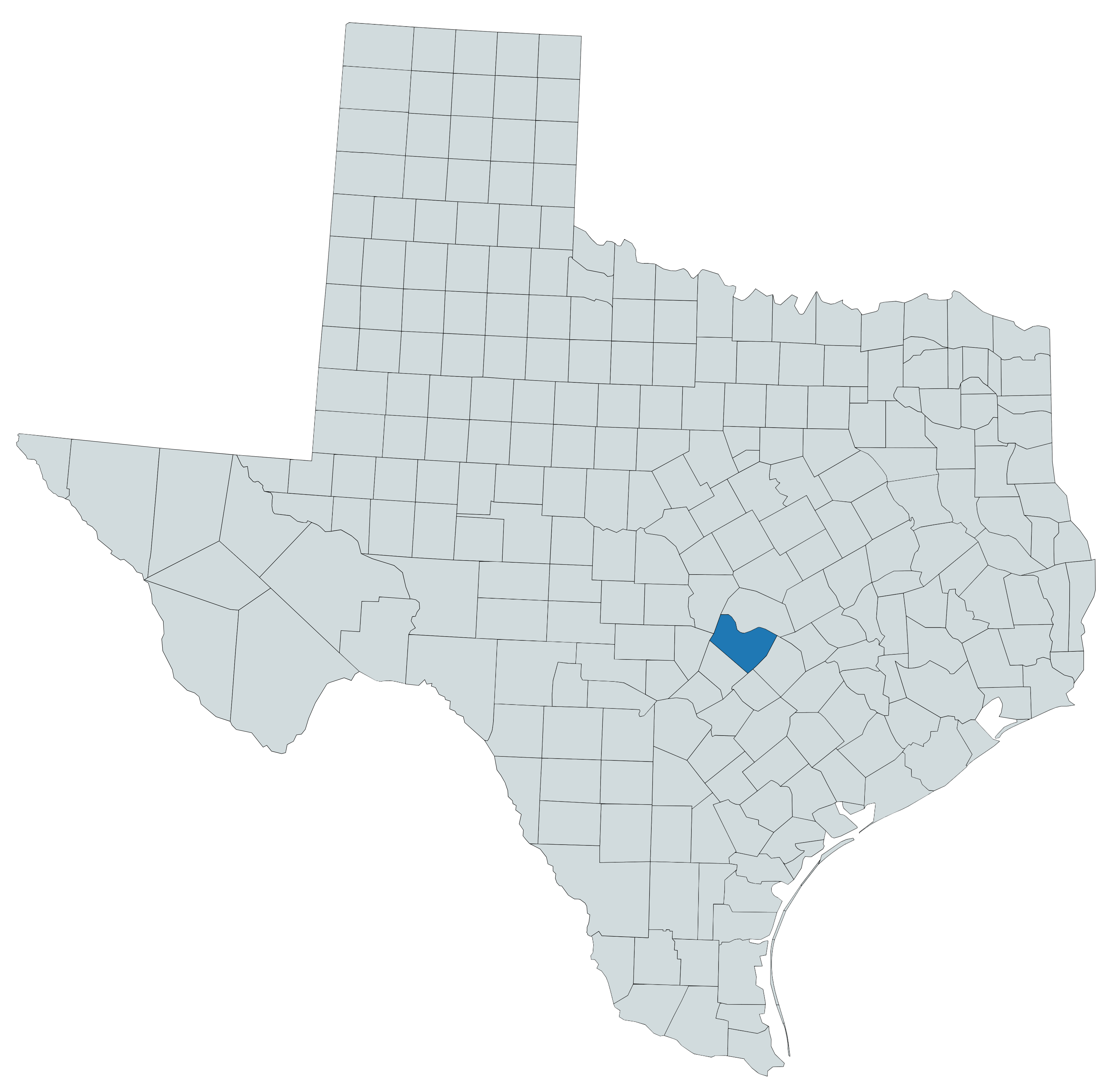
- Range of Iva corbinii

Species of flowering plant

Iva corbinii is a rare North American species of flowering plants in the family Asteraceae. It has been found only in Travis County in central Texas.

Iva corbinii appears related to the much more widespread I. axillaris but is considerably larger. It is a wind-pollinated perennial subshrub up to 200 cm (80 inches) tall with a large taproot. It has many oval leaves up to 7 cm (2.8 inches) long. Flowers are set in the axils of the leaves rather than congregated at the tips of branches as in related species. Each head can contain 7-13 florets.
