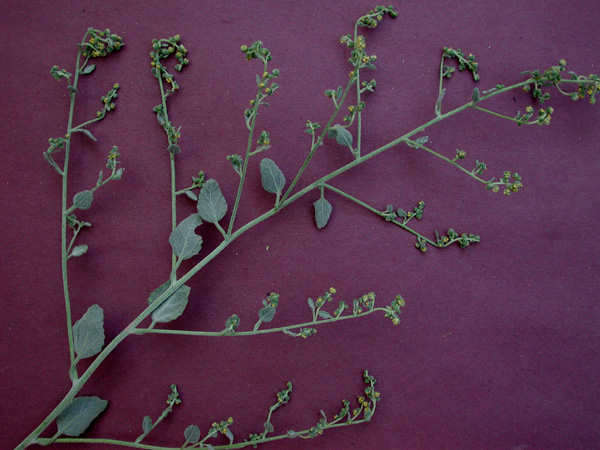

Conservation status
- Apparently Secure (NatureServe)

Scientific classification
- Kingdom: Plantae
- Clade: Tracheophytes
- Clade: Angiosperms
- Clade: Eudicots
- Clade: Asterids
- Order: Asterales
- Family: Asteraceae
- Tribe: Heliantheae
- Genus: Dicoria
- Species: D. canescens

Binomial name
- Dicoria canescens A.Gray

Synonyms
- Dicoria brandegeei A.Gray; Dicoria clarkae Kennedy; Dicoria clarkiae P.B.Kenn.; Dicoria hispidula Rydb.; Dicoria oblongifolia Rydb.; Dicoria paniculata Eastw.; Dicoria wetherillii Eastw.

= Dicoria canescens =

Species of flowering plant

Dicoria canescens is a North American flowering plant in the family Asteraceae known by several common names including desert twinbugs and bugseed. This is a desert plant of the southwestern United States and northwestern Mexico, found in Sonora, Baja California, southern California, Nevada, Arizona, Utah, southwestern Colorado, and northwestern New Mexico.

Dicoria canescens forms thickets of many individuals in the desert sand. The distinctive lower leaves are long, pointed, sharply toothed, and covered in a coat of thin white or gray hairs. The upper leaves are smaller and more rounded. One plant can produce several whitish flower heads containing disc florets but no ray florets. Sometimes the heads form closely associated pairs, a characteristic which is the origin of the common name "twinbugs".
