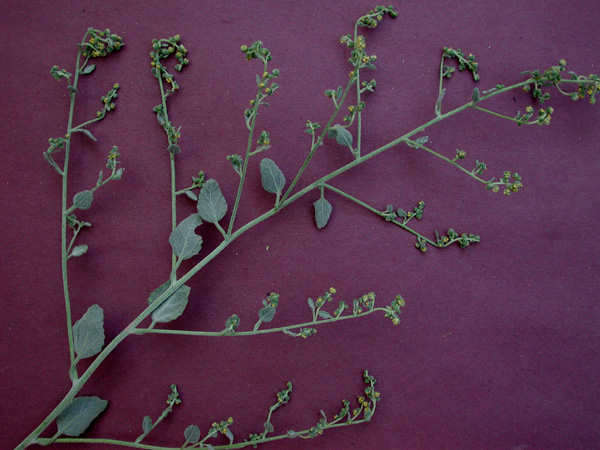
- Dicoria canescens

Scientific classification
- Kingdom: Plantae
- Clade: Tracheophytes
- Clade: Angiosperms
- Clade: Eudicots
- Clade: Asterids
- Order: Asterales
- Family: Asteraceae
- Tribe: Heliantheae
- Subtribe: Ambrosiinae
- Genus: Dicoria; Torrey & A.Gray

= Dicoria (plant) =

Genus of flowering plants

Dicoria (twinbugs) is a genus of North American flowering plants in the tribe Heliantheae within the family Asteraceae, native to the southwestern United States and northwestern Mexico.

Species

- Dicoria argentea Strother - northwestern Mexico (Sonora)
- Dicoria calliptera Rose & Standl. - northwestern Mexico (Sonora)
- Dicoria canescens A.Gray - northwestern Mexico (Baja California, Sonora), United States (California Nevada Arizona Utah New Mexico Colorado)
