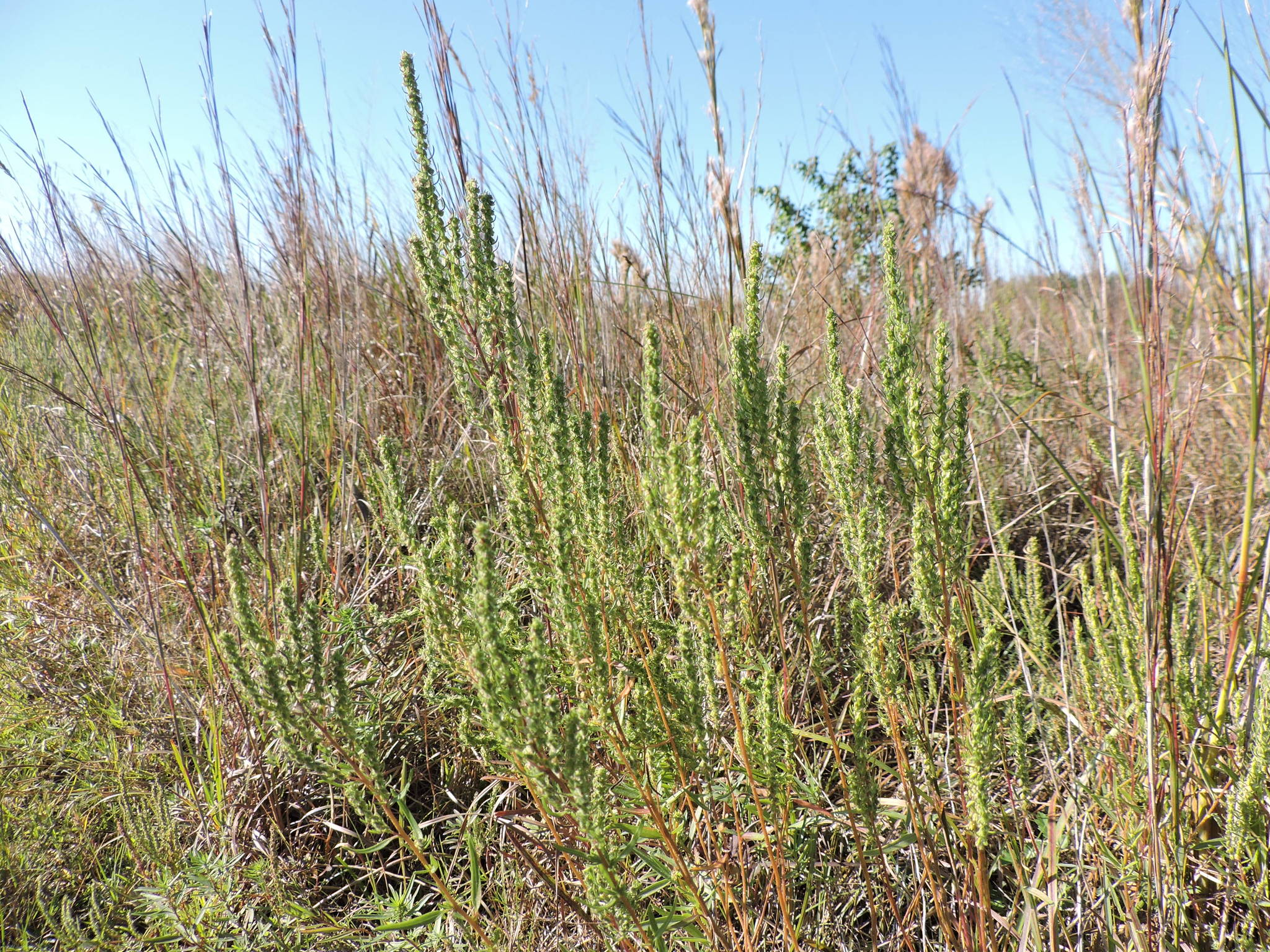
- In Texas

Scientific classification
- Kingdom: Plantae
- Clade: Tracheophytes
- Clade: Angiosperms
- Clade: Eudicots
- Clade: Asterids
- Order: Asterales
- Family: Asteraceae
- Tribe: Heliantheae
- Genus: Iva
- Species: I. asperifolia

Binomial name
- Iva asperifolia Less.

= Iva asperifolia =

Species of flowering plant

Iva asperifolia, the Pensacola marsh elder, is a species of flowering plant in the family Asteraceae. It grows in the south-central United States (Kansas, Oklahoma, Arkansas, Texas, and Louisiana, with naturalized populations in Florida, Missouri, and Indiana). It has also been found in the state of Veracruz in eastern Mexico.

Iva asperifolia is a wind-pollinated herb up to 30 cm (1 foot) tall. It has lance-linear leaves, and many small nodding (hanging) flower heads in elongated arrays, each head with a few small flowers.
