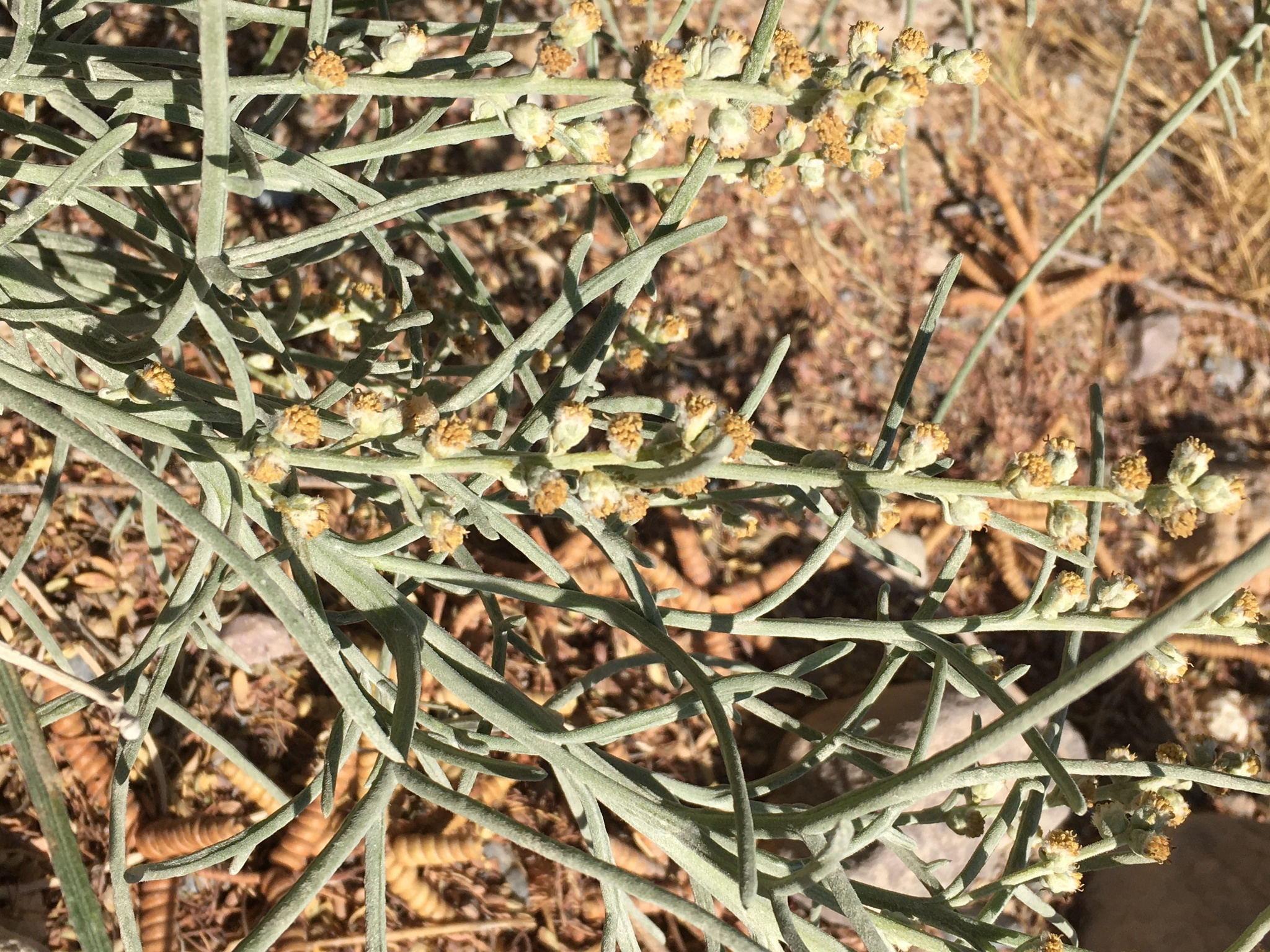

Conservation status
- Secure (NatureServe)

Scientific classification
- Kingdom: Plantae
- Clade: Tracheophytes
- Clade: Angiosperms
- Clade: Eudicots
- Clade: Asterids
- Order: Asterales
- Family: Asteraceae
- Genus: Euphrosyne
- Species: E. acerosa

Binomial name
- Euphrosyne acerosa (Nutt.) Panero

Synonyms
- Iva acerosa (Nutt.) R.C.Jacks.; Oxytenia acerosa Nutt.

= Euphrosyne acerosa =

Genus of flowering plants

Euphrosyne acerosa, commonly known as copperweed, is a species of plant in the family Asteraceae. It is native to the south-western United States (California (Inyo Co), Nevada (Nye Co), Utah, western Colorado, Arizona and north-western New Mexico).
