= Parthenice =

Scientific classification
- Kingdom: Plantae
- Clade: Tracheophytes
- Clade: Angiosperms
- Clade: Eudicots
- Clade: Asterids
- Order: Asterales
- Family: Asteraceae
- Subfamily: Asteroideae
- Tribe: Heliantheae
- Subtribe: Ambrosiinae
- Genus: Parthenice; A.Gray
- Species: P. mollis

Binomial name
- Parthenice mollis A.Gray

Genus of flowering plants

Parthenice is a genus of flowering plants in the family Asteraceae.

Species

There is only one known species, Parthenice mollis, the annual monsterwort, native to Arizona (Pima, Santa Cruz, + Cochise Counties) and northwestern Mexico (Sonora, Chihuahua, Sinaloa, Baja California Sur).

Varieties

1. Parthenice mollis var. mollis - Arizona, Sonora, Chihuahua, Sinaloa
2. Parthenice mollis var. peninsularis Sauck - Baja California Sur
