= Dicoria calliptera =

Scientific classification
- Kingdom: Plantae
- Clade: Tracheophytes
- Clade: Angiosperms
- Clade: Eudicots
- Clade: Asterids
- Order: Asterales
- Family: Asteraceae
- Genus: Dicoria
- Species: D. calliptera

Binomial name
- Dicoria calliptera Rose & Standl.

Species of flowering plant

Dicoria calliptera is a Mexican species of flowering plant in the family Asteraceae. It has been found only in the State of Sonora, on hills near Adair Bay at the northern end of the Gulf of California, west of Puerto Peñasco.

Dicoria calliptera has spreading branches up to 50 cm (20 inches) long. Leaves are egg-shaped, very small, rarely more than 15 mm (0.6 inches) long. One plant can produce many small flower heads.
