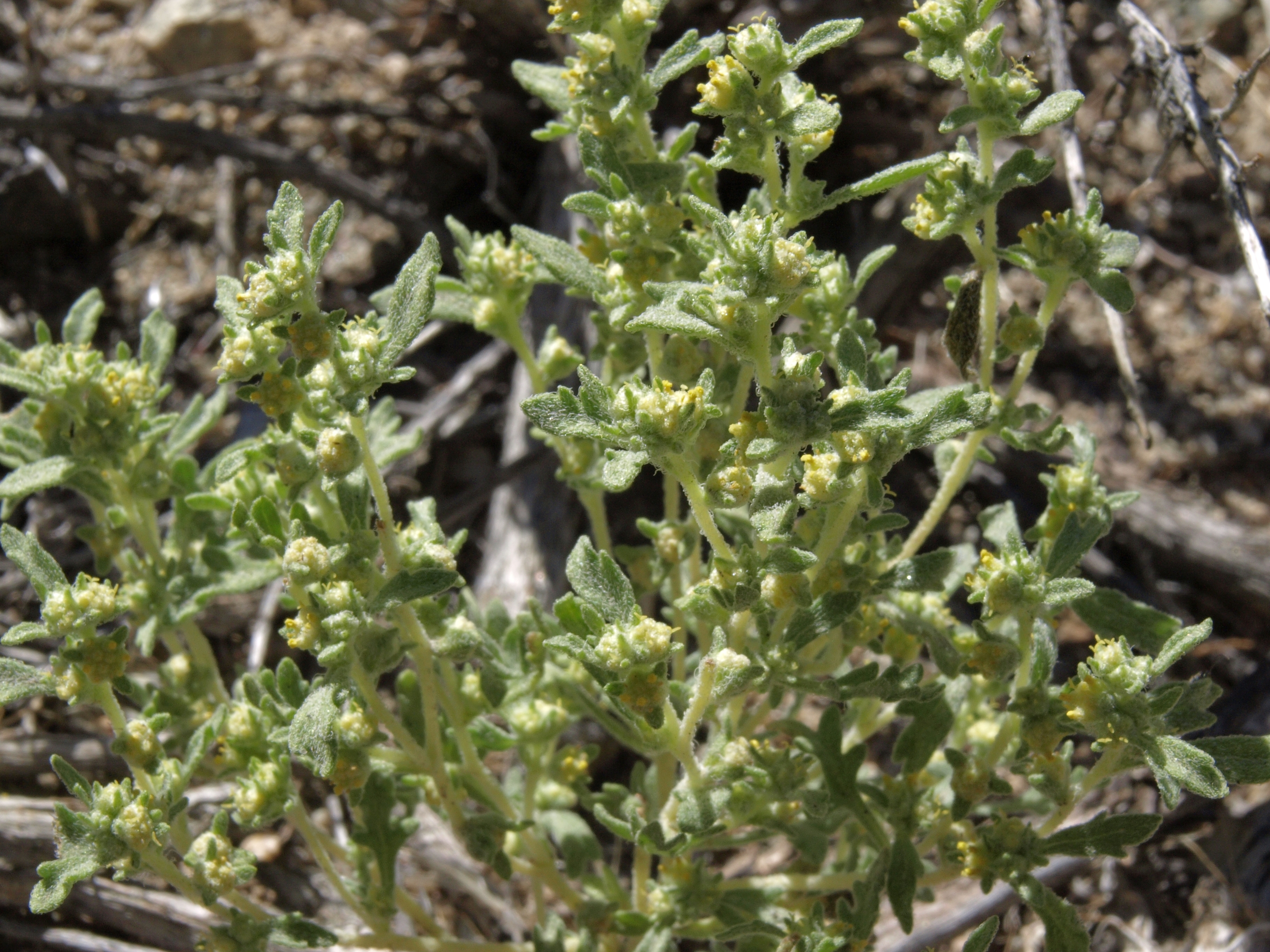

Scientific classification
- Kingdom: Plantae
- Clade: Embryophytes
- Clade: Tracheophytes
- Clade: Angiosperms
- Clade: Eudicots
- Clade: Asterids
- Order: Asterales
- Family: Asteraceae
- Tribe: Heliantheae
- Genus: Euphrosyne
- Species: E. nevadensis

Binomial name
- Euphrosyne nevadensis (M.E.Jones) Panero

Synonyms
- Chorisiva nevadensis (M.E.Jones) Rydb.; Iva nevadensis M.E.Jones

= Euphrosyne nevadensis =

Genus of flowering plants

Euphrosyne nevadensis is a species of plant in the family Asteraceae. It is native to the western United States where it is found in Nevada, eastern California (Inyo and Mono Counties).
