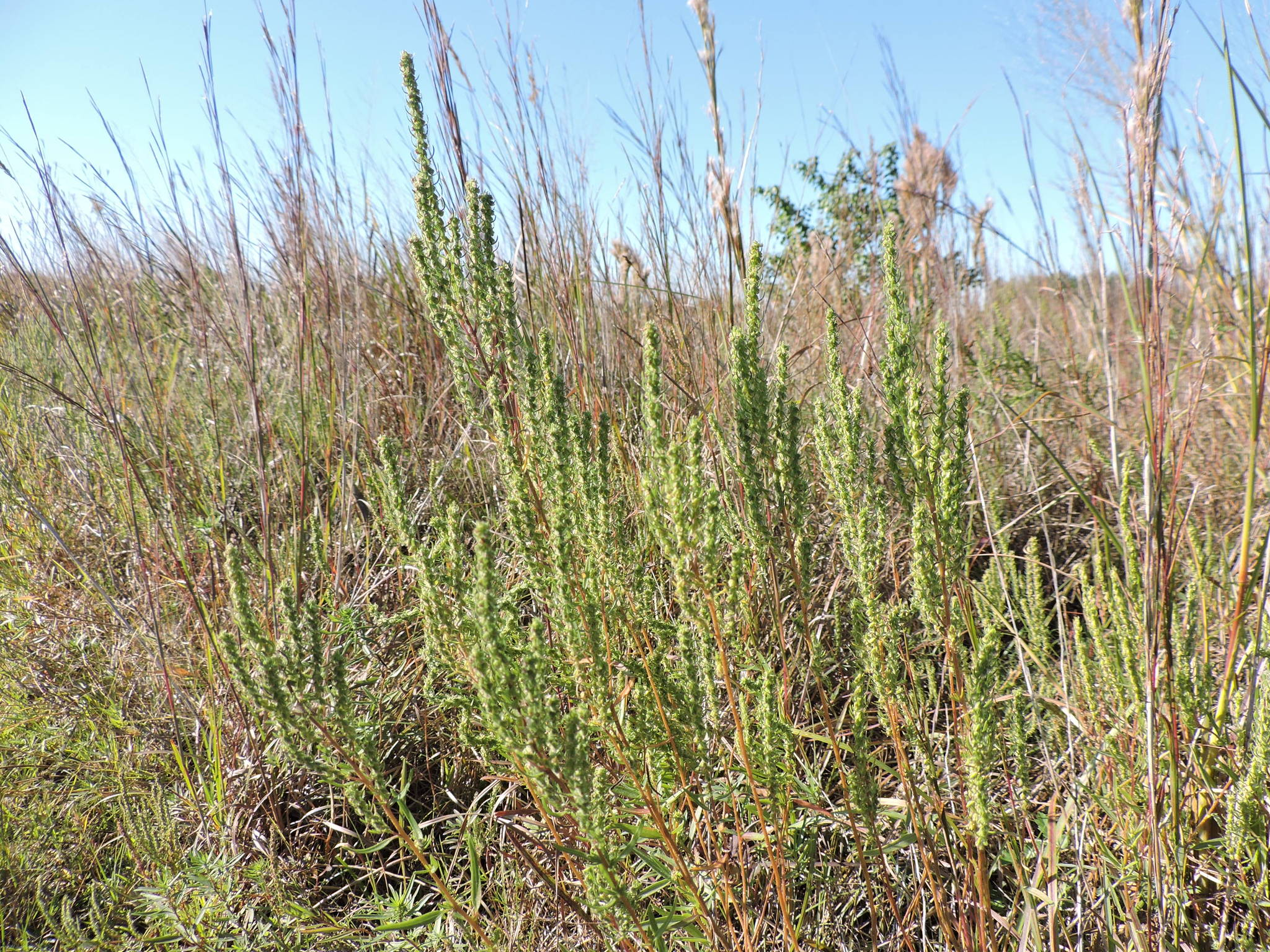

Scientific classification
- Kingdom: Plantae
- Clade: Tracheophytes
- Clade: Angiosperms
- Clade: Eudicots
- Clade: Asterids
- Order: Asterales
- Family: Asteraceae
- Genus: Iva
- Species: I. angustifolia

Binomial name
- Iva angustifolia Nutt. ex DC. 1836

Synonyms
- Iva texensis R.C.Jacks.

= Iva angustifolia =

Species of flowering plant

Iva angustifolia is a species of flowering plant in the family Asteraceae known by the common name narrowleaf marsh elder. It grows in the south-central and southeastern United States (Kansas, Oklahoma, Arkansas, Texas, Louisiana, Florida).

Iva angustifolia is a wind-pollinated annual herb sometimes as much as 100 cm (40 inches) tall. It has long, narrow leaves up to 45 mm (1.8 inches) tall. It produces numerous small flower heads in elongated arrays at the tips of branches, each head with 2-7 flowers.
