= Iva cheiranthifolia =

Scientific classification
- Kingdom: Plantae
- Clade: Tracheophytes
- Clade: Angiosperms
- Clade: Eudicots
- Clade: Asterids
- Order: Asterales
- Family: Asteraceae
- Genus: Iva
- Species: I. cheiranthifolia

Binomial name
- Iva cheiranthifolia Kunth 1818

Synonyms
- Anthemis crassifolia Humb. ex Steud. 1840 not Sessé & Moc. 1894

Species of flowering plant

Iva cheiranthifolia, the fly marsh elder, is a Caribbean species of flowering plants in the family Asteraceae. It has been found in Cuba, the Bahamas, and the Cayman Islands.
