= Dicoria argentea =

Scientific classification
- Kingdom: Plantae
- Clade: Tracheophytes
- Clade: Angiosperms
- Clade: Eudicots
- Clade: Asterids
- Order: Asterales
- Family: Asteraceae
- Genus: Dicoria
- Species: D. argentea

Binomial name
- Dicoria argentea Strother

Species of flowering plant

Dicoria argentea is a Mexican species flowering plant in the family Asteraceae. It has been found only in the State of Sonora, on coastal sand dunes south of the City of Guaymas, including on Isla Lobos and Isla Huivulai in the Gulf of California.

Dicoria argentea is a sprawling subshrub up to 20 cm (8 inches) tall, forming colonies up to 3 meters (10 feet) in diameter. Flower heads are sometimes borne one at a time, other times in clumps of 2 or 3, with male and female flower parts in separate disc florets in the same head. Female florets have no corollas; male florets have yellow corollas. There are no ray florets.
