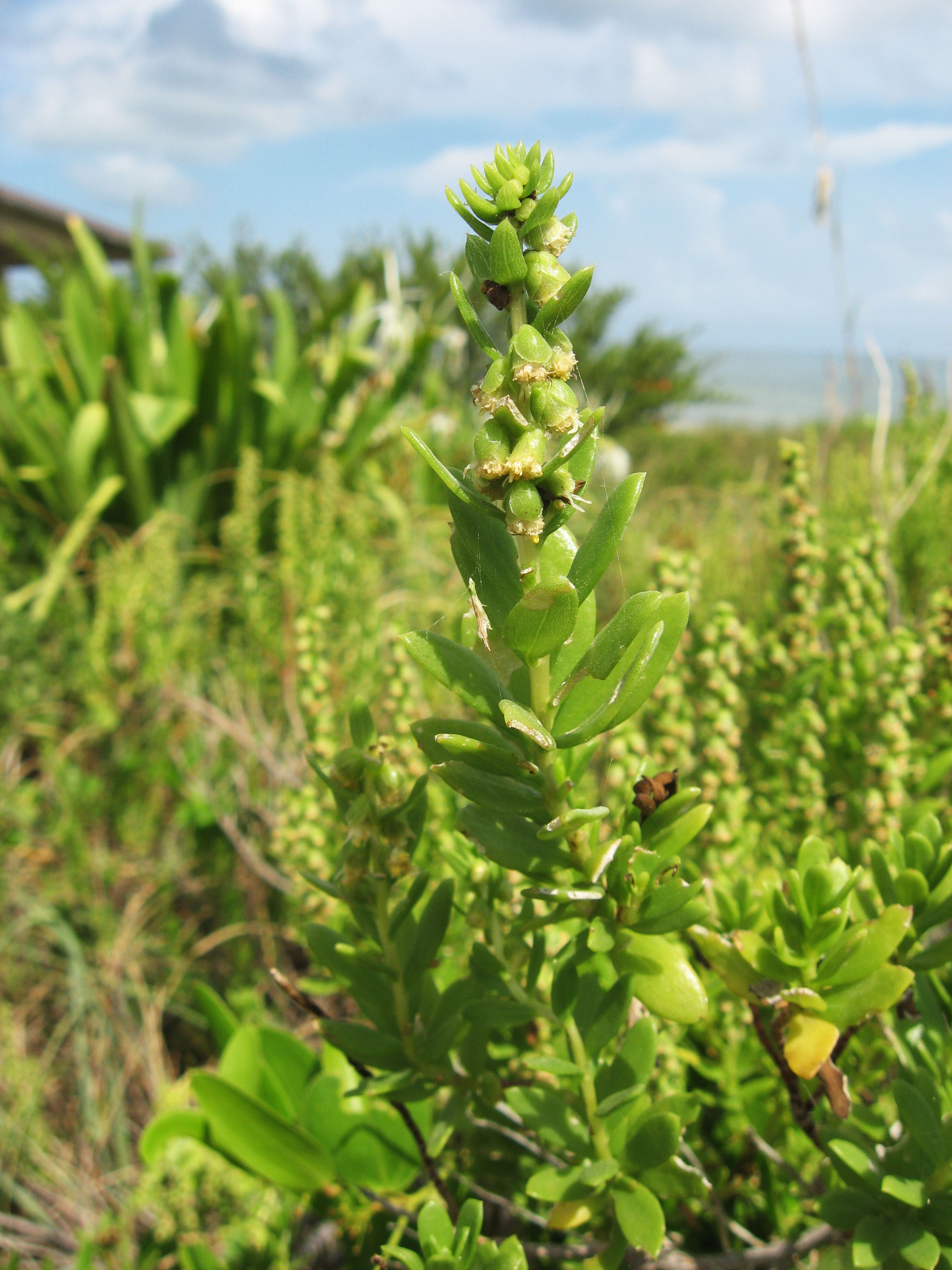

Scientific classification
- Kingdom: Plantae
- Clade: Tracheophytes
- Clade: Angiosperms
- Clade: Eudicots
- Clade: Asterids
- Order: Asterales
- Family: Asteraceae
- Genus: Iva
- Species: I. imbricata

Binomial name
- Iva imbricata Walter 1788

Synonyms
- Baillieria caroliniana Spreng.

= Iva imbricata =

Species of flowering plant

Iva imbricata is a North American species of flowering plant in the family Asteraceae known by the common names dune marsh-elder and seacoast marsh elder. It is native to Cuba, the Bahamas, and coastal areas of the United States from Texas to Virginia. It is a low shrub, found on sand dunes and the upper beach. It is highly salt tolerant, often situated as the most seaward perennial plant. It is commonly planted along southeastern beaches.

I. imbricata is an important species for dune stabilization and can easily be propagated by cuttings. Leaves are 1-3 mm thick fleshy, 0.4-1.5 cm wide, 1.5-6 cm long, glabrous (or strigillose on faces), with mostly smooth margins, may be opposite toward apex and alternate from midstem on. It is mostly found in maritime environs, such as brackish marshes edges or dune faces and toes. It sometimes grows up to 100 cm (40 inches) tall. It produces numerous flower heads in elongated arrays, each head with 2-17 disc flowers but no ray flowers, outer phyllaries have distinct involucres 4-7 mm high.
