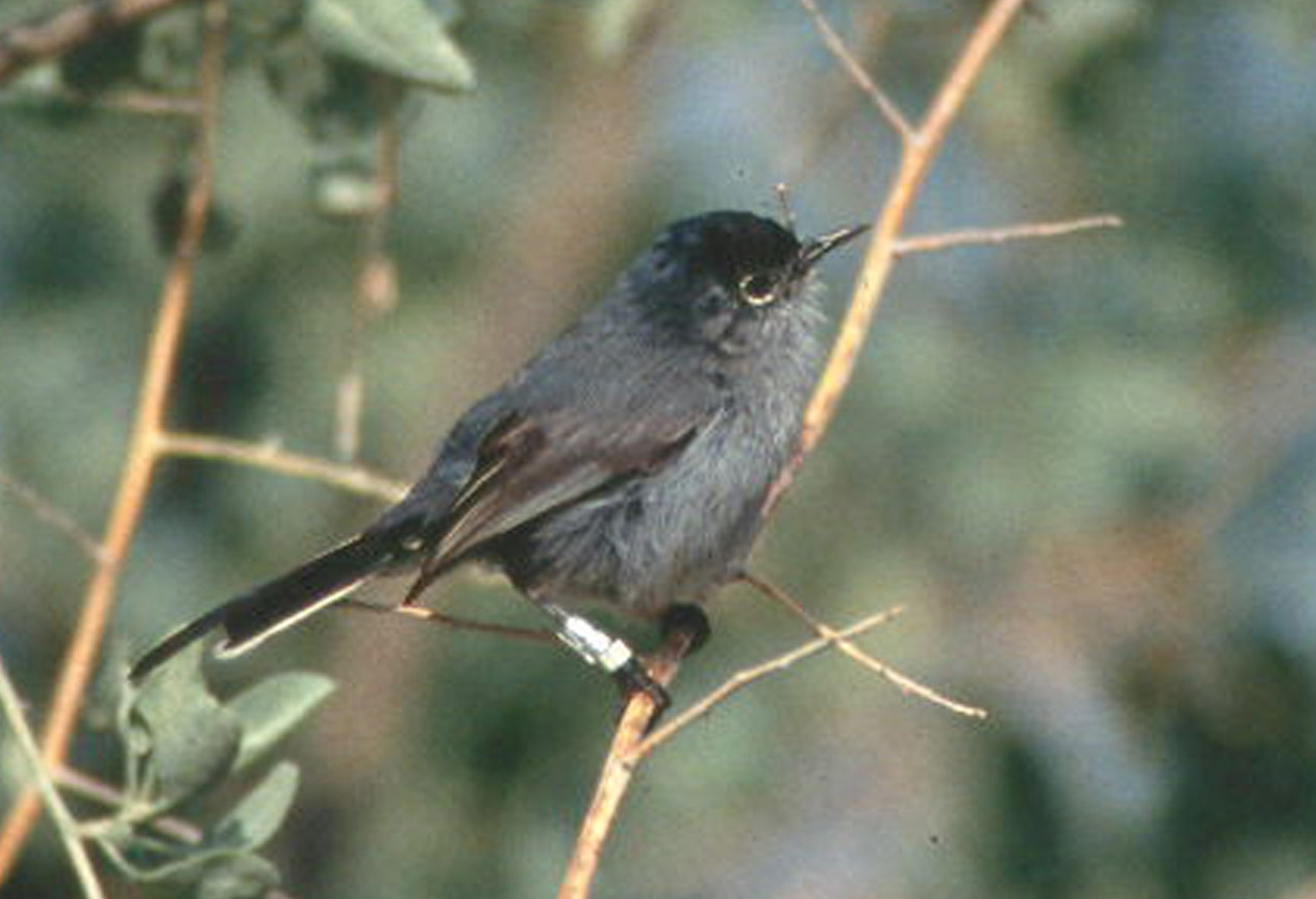

Conservation status
- Least Concern (IUCN 3.1)

Scientific classification
- Kingdom: Animalia
- Phylum: Chordata
- Class: Aves
- Order: Passeriformes
- Family: Polioptilidae
- Genus: Polioptila
- Species: P. californica

Binomial name
- Polioptila californica Brewster, 1881

Subspecies
- Polioptila californica californica; Polioptila californica margaritae; Polioptila californica pontilis

= California gnatcatcher =

Species of bird

The California gnatcatcher (Polioptila californica) is a small, 10.8-centimetre-long (4.3 in) insectivorous bird which frequents dense coastal sage scrub growth. This species was recently split from the similar black-tailed gnatcatcher of the Sonoran and Chihuahuan deserts. This bird is often solitary, but joins with other birds in winter flocks.

== Description ==
The male California gnatcatcher is dusky gray overall, distinguished only by its black crown and thin black beak. It has a long, thin black tail with narrow white tips and edges on the underside of the tail feathers. However, the male loses its plumage colors by winter and obtains a plumage color similar to the females. The female is similar to the male, but with a blue-gray instead of a black crown.

In its range from coastal Southern California south through Baja California and Baja California Sur, this inconspicuous non-migratory resident is most often seen flitting hastily into undergrowth, or heard giving its call, which sounds like a kitten's meow, a rising and falling zeeeeer, zeeeeer.

== Diet ==
The California gnatcatcher's diet consists of small insects and spiders.

== Habitat ==
In the main part of its range on the Baja California peninsula, the California gnatcatcher inhabits a variety of dry habitats including the Baja California desert and Gulf of California xeric scrub. On the northwest edge of its distribution in the states of Baja California and California, it is entirely restricted to coastal sage scrub.

In the northern part of its range (Southern California) this species was listed as Threatened by the United States Fish and Wildlife Service in 1993 due to increasing development in its habitat, coastal sage scrub (current loss of coastal sage scrub in U.S. is estimated at 70 to 90 percent). Critical habitat under the Endangered Species Act has been designated for the California gnatcatcher. This species is especially vulnerable as a metapopulation due to its small populations in a limited habitat often live in the prime land to be developed for housing and commerce that can be easily isolated and reduced in size.

Though some of its habitat has been saved in public conservation lands such as state parks, its population has been severely fragmented. There are, however, ongoing efforts to preserve more open land in southern California to help ensure that this species will not disappear from its former range. California gnatcatchers are a focal species in many regional habitat conservation planning efforts.

== Ecology and reproduction ==
Monogamous pairs care for their brood of 3–4 eggs in small cup-shaped nests. Brown-headed cowbirds are parasites that lay eggs in their nests.

The California gnatcatcher molts into breeding plumage in February. Nest building is from early March to mid-June, peaking in April and May.

Males choose the location of the nest and do most of the building while females create the lining. The main materials used are grasses and bark fibers. The lining is made from finer grasses, fur, feathers, and plant down. Old nest materials are often reused for new nests. The nests are built in as little as 4 days and are often found in the forks of shrubs, on average 80 cm off the ground. The most successful nests are found in California sagebrush and 70-90 cm off the ground.

Eggs are incubated for an average of 14 days. Both male and female California gnatcatchers incubate, but the females typically sit longer. Chicks leave the nest after about 13 days. They are mainly fed tiny insects at first, then larger insects and caterpillars, and are fed for 3-5 weeks after fledging. Afterwards, they are chased out of the territory to live on their own.

In one study, only about 34% of nests produced young. Predation is the main cause of failures, destroying on average 43% of all nests. Likely predators include snakes, mammals (such as raccoons, coyotes, and foxes), and birds (such as California scrub jays and roadrunners). Early-season nests are occasionally washed out by rain. Pairs of California gnatcatchers averaged 3-7 nesting attempts per season, and one pair even made 10. New nests are often started the day after losing one. Some pairs raise 2 broods, occasionally even 3.
