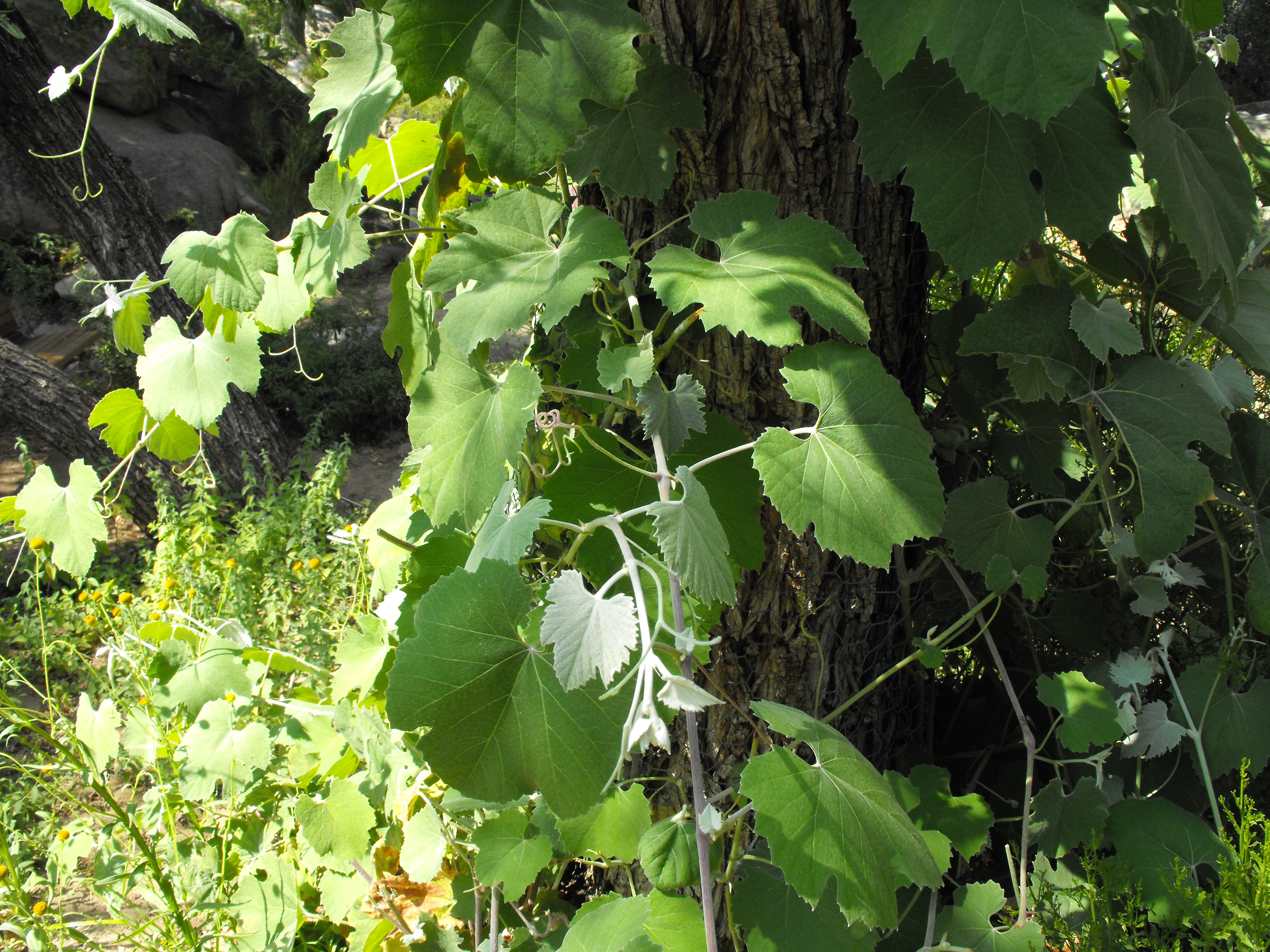

Conservation status
- Apparently Secure (NatureServe)

Scientific classification
- Kingdom: Plantae
- Clade: Tracheophytes
- Clade: Angiosperms
- Clade: Eudicots
- Clade: Rosids
- Order: Vitales
- Family: Vitaceae
- Genus: Vitis
- Species: V. girdiana

Binomial name
- Vitis girdiana Munson

= Vitis girdiana =

Coyote grape

Species of grapevine

Vitis girdiana is as species of wild grape known as the desert wild grape, coyote grape, or valley grape. It is native to southern California in the United States and to Baja California in Mexico.

Vitis girdiana is a woody vine with a coating of woolly hairs, especially on new growth. The woolly leaves are heart-shaped to kidney-shaped with toothed edges and sometimes shallow lobes. The inflorescence is a panicle of unisexual flowers. The fruit is a spherical black grape usually not more than 8 millimeters wide.

It grows in canyon and streambank habitat in hills and mountains of the region.

== Uses ==
Various Native American groups used the fruit and seeds. The Kumeyaay ate the fruit fresh or dried into raisins and cooked, they also rubbed the sap on falling or thin hair to help its health and make it grow. The Luiseño called it Makwit and cooked the fruit for food. The Cahuilla used it fresh, cooked, or dried into raisins, and made it into wine.

== Gallery ==
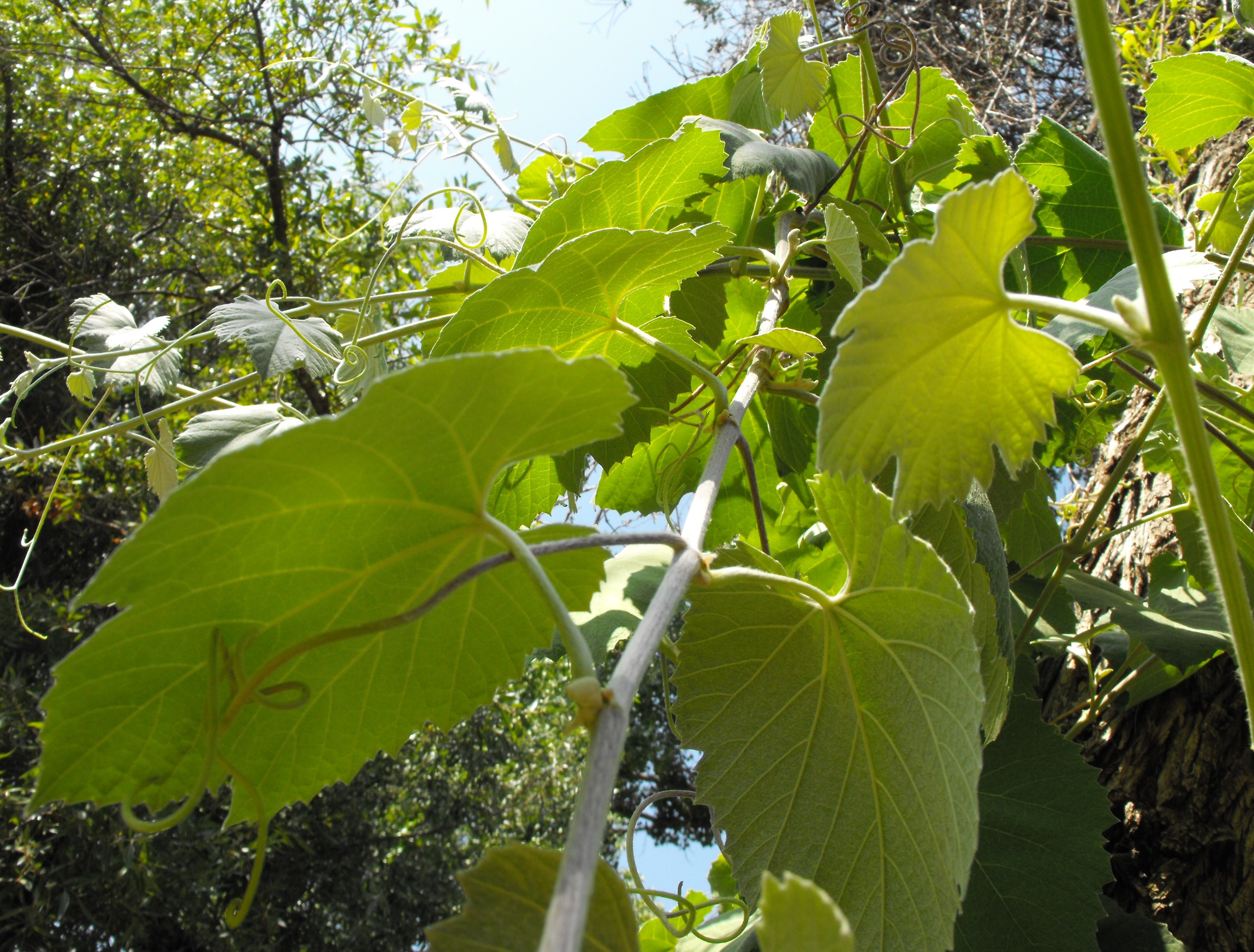

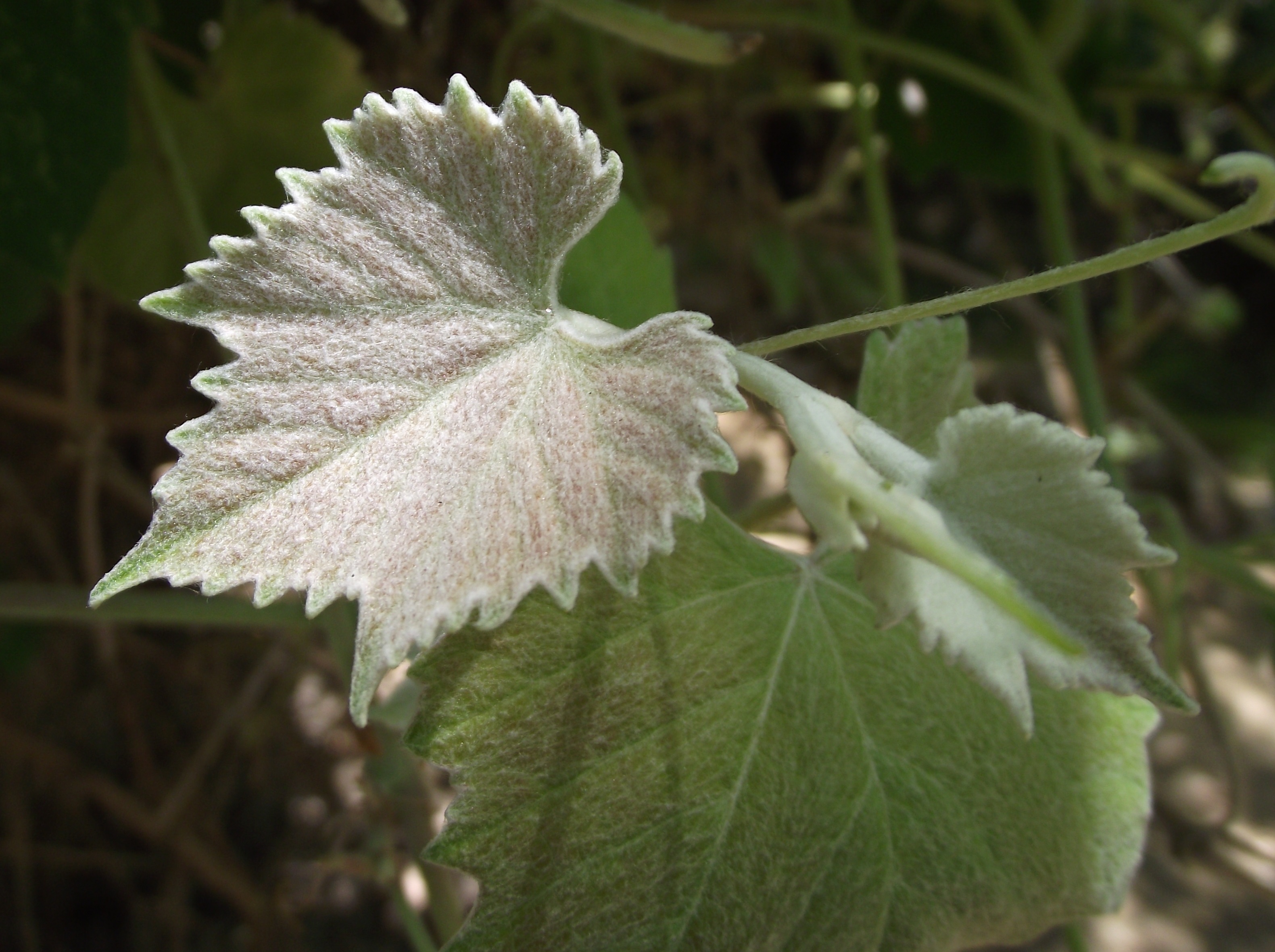
