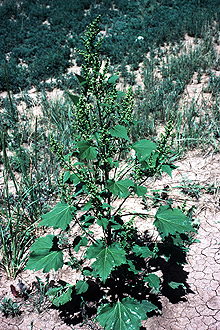

Conservation status
- Secure (NatureServe)

Scientific classification
- Kingdom: Plantae
- Clade: Tracheophytes
- Clade: Angiosperms
- Clade: Eudicots
- Clade: Asterids
- Order: Asterales
- Family: Asteraceae
- Subfamily: Asteroideae
- Tribe: Heliantheae
- Subtribe: Ambrosiinae
- Genus: Cyclachaena; Fresen.
- Species: C. xanthiifolia

Binomial name
- Cyclachaena xanthiifolia Nutt.

Synonyms
- Cyclachaena pedicellata Rydb.; Euphrosyne xanthiifolia (Nutt.) A.Gray; Iva paniculata Nutt.; Iva pedicellata (Rydb.) Cory; Iva xanthiifolia Nutt.

= Cyclachaena =

Species of flowering plant

Cyclachaena xanthiifolia (syn. Iva xanthiifolia), known as giant sumpweed, or rag sumpweed is a North American plant species in the sunflower family, Asteraceae. It is the only species in the genus Cyclachaena. Giant sumpweed is believed to be native to the Great Plains but is now found across much of southern Canada and the contiguous United States, though rarely in the Southeast.

It is an annual herb roughly 45–185 centimetres (18–72 inches) tall with stout, erect, branched stems. The stems are erect or ascending, finely ridged or grooved, and grayish-green. They are usually unbranched but sometimes have straight, upright branches. They are hairless near the base and are sparsely to moderately covered with fine curved or curled hairs above the base.

In Britain and Ireland, it is known as marsh-elder. It has been introduced and semi-naturalized in central and southern Britain, partly via seeds bought for bird food.

== Description ==
The leaf pattern of this herbaceous plant is opposite, sometimes becoming alternate towards the top of the plant. The leaves are long-stalked and double-toothed with rough hairs on the top, and light green and fuzzy on the bottom. Lower leaves are long-stalked, the stalks up to 70 mm (2 3/4 in) long or longer. Upper leaves are short-stalked, and the stalks are up to 10 mm (3/8 in) long or longer.

The flowers are green to white in panicled spikes roughly 25 cm (10 in) long. Some flowers are pistillate and fertile while others are perfect but sterile. The flowers bloom from August–October. The individual flower heads droop at the end of a 5 to 6.5 mm (3/16 to 1/4 in) long or longer stalk. The whorl of bracts at the base of the flower head (involucre) is 2 to 3 mm (1/16 to 1/8 in) long. The disk is composed of 8 to 20, usually no more than 10, male (staminate) florets in the center and usually 5 female (pistillate) florets around the margin. The flowers bloom from August–October. The staminate florets have stamens with the filaments fused into a tube and the anthers free but closely arranged in a ring. The corolla is about 2 mm (1/16 in) long and white to pale yellow. The pistillate florets have stamens with the filaments into a tube and the anthers free but closely arranged in a ring. The corolla is sometimes absent. When present it is about 0.4 mm (1/64 in) long and whitish.

The fruit is an egg-shaped achene, dark brown to nearly black, 2 to 3 mm (1/16 to 1/8 in) long, with a tuft of hairs attached to one end.

== Habitat and ecology ==
Cyclachaena xanthiifolia grows in moist areas or previously disturbed sites. It can also be found in fields or along roadsides and streams.

== Effects ==
If consumed by cows, it can make the milk that is produced taste bitter. The leaves can cause dermatitis in some individuals. The pollen of this plant can cause autumn hay fever in some individuals.
