= Hedosyne =

Scientific classification
- Kingdom: Plantae
- Clade: Tracheophytes
- Clade: Angiosperms
- Clade: Eudicots
- Clade: Asterids
- Order: Asterales
- Family: Asteraceae
- Subfamily: Asteroideae
- Tribe: Heliantheae
- Subtribe: Ambrosiinae
- Genus: Hedosyne; Strother
- Species: H. ambrosiifolia

Binomial name
- Hedosyne ambrosiifolia (A.Gray) Strother

Synonyms
- Iva ambrosiifolia var. lobata (Rydb.) B.L.Turner; Cyclachaena ambrosiaefolia (A.Gray); Cyclachaena lobata Rydb.; Cyclachaena ambrosiifolia (A.Gray) Benth. & Hook.f. ex B.D.Jacks.; Iva ambrosiifolia subsp. lobata (Rydb.) R.C.Jacks.; Cyclachaena ambrosiifolia (A.Gray) Benth. & Hook.f. ex Rydb.; Iva ambrosiifolia (A.Gray) A.Gray

Genus of flowering plants

Hedosyne is a genus of plants in the family Asteraceae.

There is only one known species, Hedosyne ambrosiifolia, native to the southwestern United States and northern Mexico: Chihuahua, Coahuila, Durango, Nuevo León, San Luis Potosí, Sonora, Zacatecas, New Mexico, western Texas, southern Arizona. The species is sometimes referred to by the common name ragged marsh-elder.
