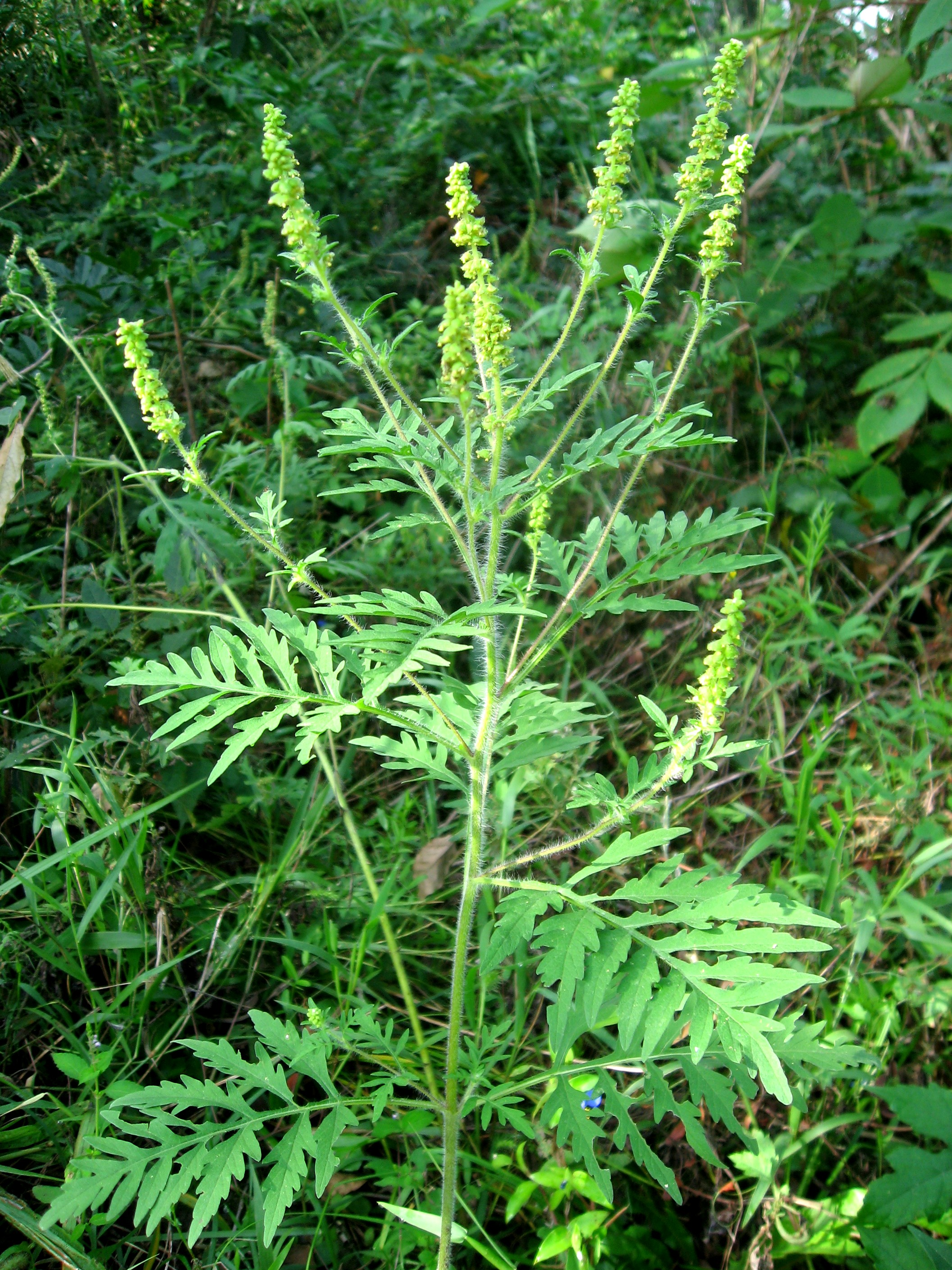
- Ambrosia artemisiifolia

Scientific classification
- Kingdom: Plantae
- Clade: Tracheophytes
- Clade: Angiosperms
- Clade: Eudicots
- Clade: Asterids
- Order: Asterales
- Family: Asteraceae
- Subfamily: Asteroideae
- Tribe: Heliantheae
- Subtribe: Ambrosiinae; Less.

= Ambrosiinae =

Subtribe of plants

Ambrosiinae is a subtribe of flowering plants in the tribe Heliantheae, the vast majority of species are native to the Americas.

== Genera ==
Genera recognized by the Global Compositae Database as of November 2022:

- Ambrosia L.
- Dicoria Torr. & A.Gray
- Euphrosyne DC.
- Hedosyne (A.Gray) Strother
- Iva L.
- Parthenice A.Gray
- Parthenium L.
- Xanthium L.
