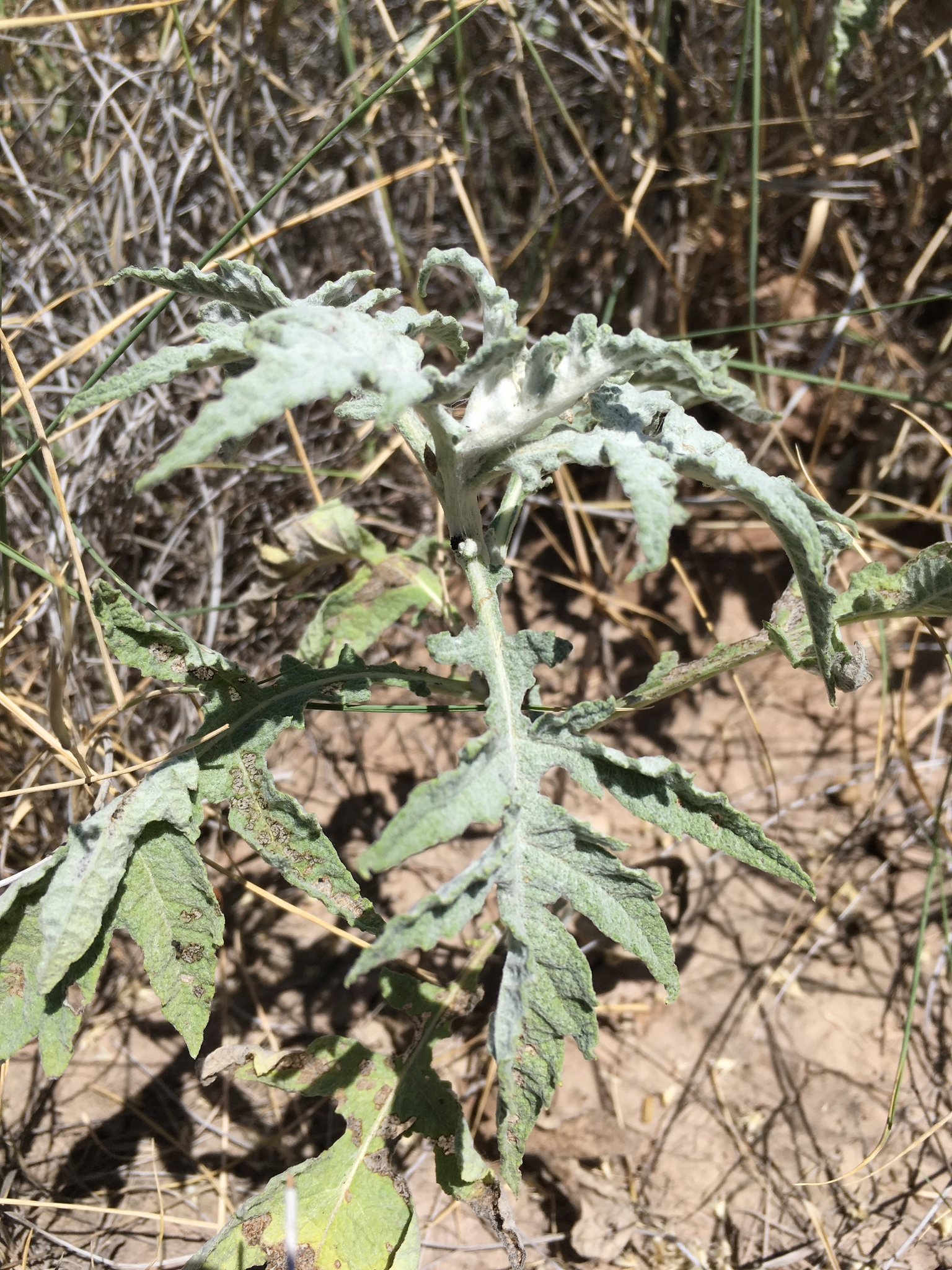

Scientific classification
- Kingdom: Plantae
- Clade: Tracheophytes
- Clade: Angiosperms
- Clade: Eudicots
- Clade: Asterids
- Order: Asterales
- Family: Asteraceae
- Genus: Euphrosyne
- Species: E. dealbata

Binomial name
- Euphrosyne dealbata (A.Gray) Panero

Synonyms
- Iva dealbata A.Gray; Leuciva dealbata (A.Gray) Rydb.

= Euphrosyne dealbata =

Genus of flowering plants

Euphrosyne dealbata, commonly known as copperweed or woolly marsh elder, is a species of plant in the family Asteraceae. It is found in western North America where it is native to northern Mexico (Chihuahua, Coahuila, Nuevo León, San Luis Potosí, Durango, Zacatecas), and the south-western United States (New Mexico, western Texas, and Cochise County in southeastern Arizona).
