= Eugène Duflot de Mofras =

French naturalist, botanist, diplomat and explorer (1810–1884)

Eugène Duflot de Mofras (French: [ø.ʒɛn dy.flo də mɔ.fʁa]; 5 July 1810 – 30 January 1884) was a French naturalist, botanist, diplomat and explorer. He was the seventh son of Vost Cosme Nicolas Duflot and Anne Julie Mofras. In the latter 1830s he became an attaché of the French legation to Mexico.

== Pacific Coast ==
In 1839 Duflot de Mofras was dispatched from his French legation post in Mexico City to explore the Pacific Coast of North America from 1840 to 1842, to access the Mexican Alta California and American Oregon Territory regions for French business interests. He travelled along and documented the western coast of mainland Mexico, the Colorado River mouth, the Baja California Peninsula coasts, and the present day West Coast of the United States in California and Oregon.

While stationed at Yerba Buena (present day San Francisco), he traveled inland to see the Rancho New Helvetia agricultural colony of John Sutter. The 1848 discovery of gold on the rancho set off the California Gold Rush. Duflot de Mofras completed his journey in 1842.

=== Results ===
The report of Duflot de Mofras was significant at the time, and remains a detailed description of aspects of the northern Pacific Coast before American dominance.

He wrote in 1840 "...it is evident that California will belong to whatever nation chooses to send there a man-of-war and two hundred men."

His account was published in 1844 as the 2-volume work Exploration du territoire de l'Orégon, des Californies et de la mer Vermeille, exécutée pendant les années 1840, 1841 et 1842 (Exploring the Oregon Territory, California and the Pacific Coast), by the Arthus Bertrand press in Paris.

It recorded the commercial, political, and military significance of the regions, and activities of the Spanish, English, and Americans there. It includes descriptions of life at some of the Spanish missions in California, including the Mission San Carlos Borromeo de Carmelo and Mission Santa Cruz.

== See also ==
- Alta California
- 1840s in California
