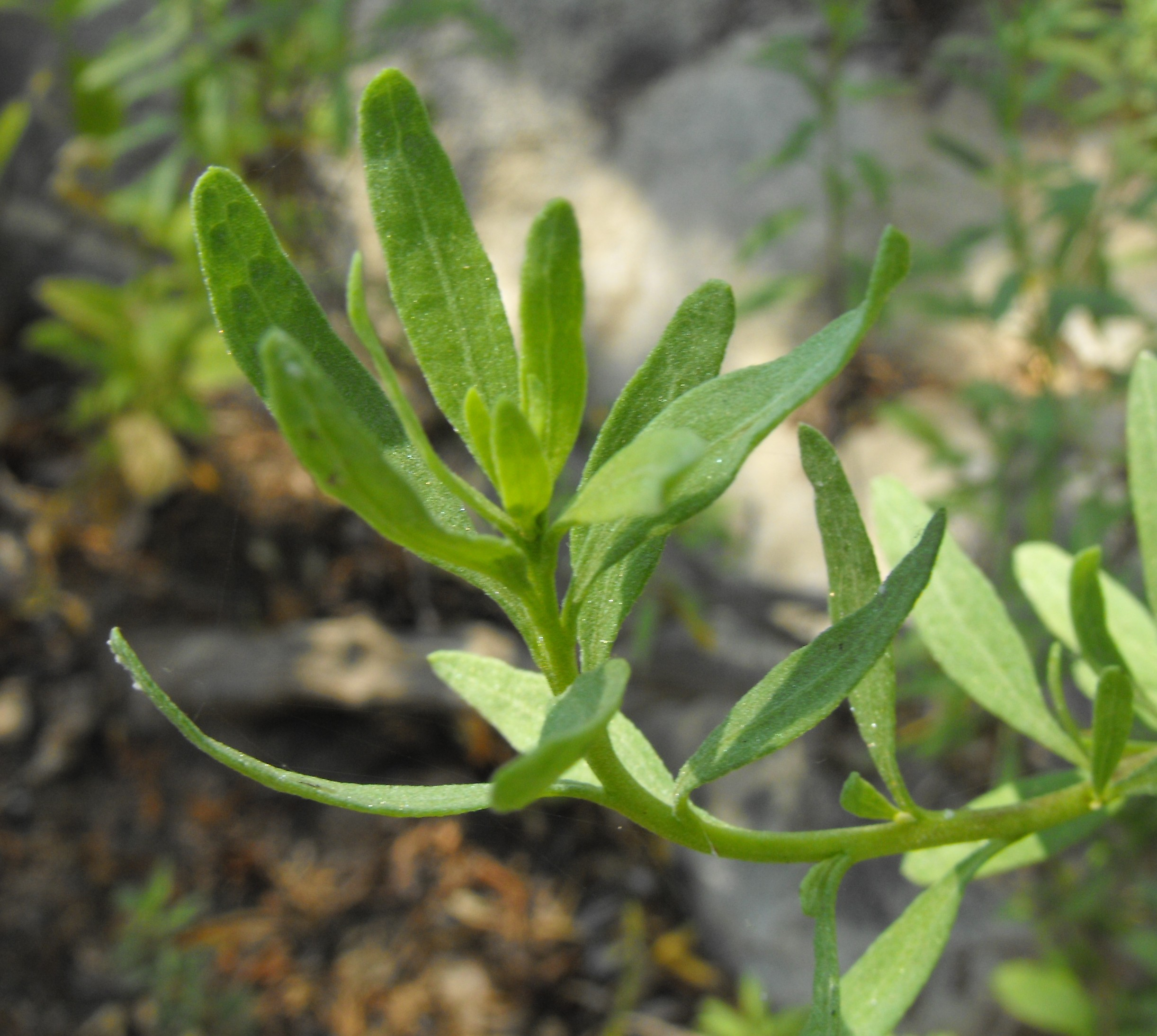

Conservation status
- Vulnerable (NatureServe)

Scientific classification
- Kingdom: Plantae
- Clade: Tracheophytes
- Clade: Angiosperms
- Clade: Eudicots
- Clade: Asterids
- Order: Asterales
- Family: Asteraceae
- Tribe: Heliantheae
- Genus: Iva
- Species: I. hayesiana

Binomial name
- Iva hayesiana Gray 1876

= Iva hayesiana =

Species of flowering plant

Iva hayesiana is a species of flowering plant in the family Asteraceae known by the common names San Diego marsh-elder and San Diego povertyweed.

It is native to northwestern Baja California and Southern California, in San Diego, Orange, Los Angeles, Ventura, and San Bernardino Counties.

== Description ==
Iva hayesiana is a shrubby perennial herb approaching one meter (40 inches) in height. Its green oval-shaped leaves are fleshy, glandular, aromatic, and 3 to 6 centimeters (1.2-2.4 inches) long.

The flowers are nearly invisible; male flowers have translucent corollas and simple yellow stamens and female flowers, if they occur, lack corollas altogether. This is a plant of mineral-rich waterways such as intermittent streams and alkali flats.

== Conservation ==
Threats to the plant include development of coastal habitat and waterways. It is a Vulnerable flora species in California.

Cultivation

This species is recommended for use as an ornamental plant in fire-resistant landscaping in Southern California.
