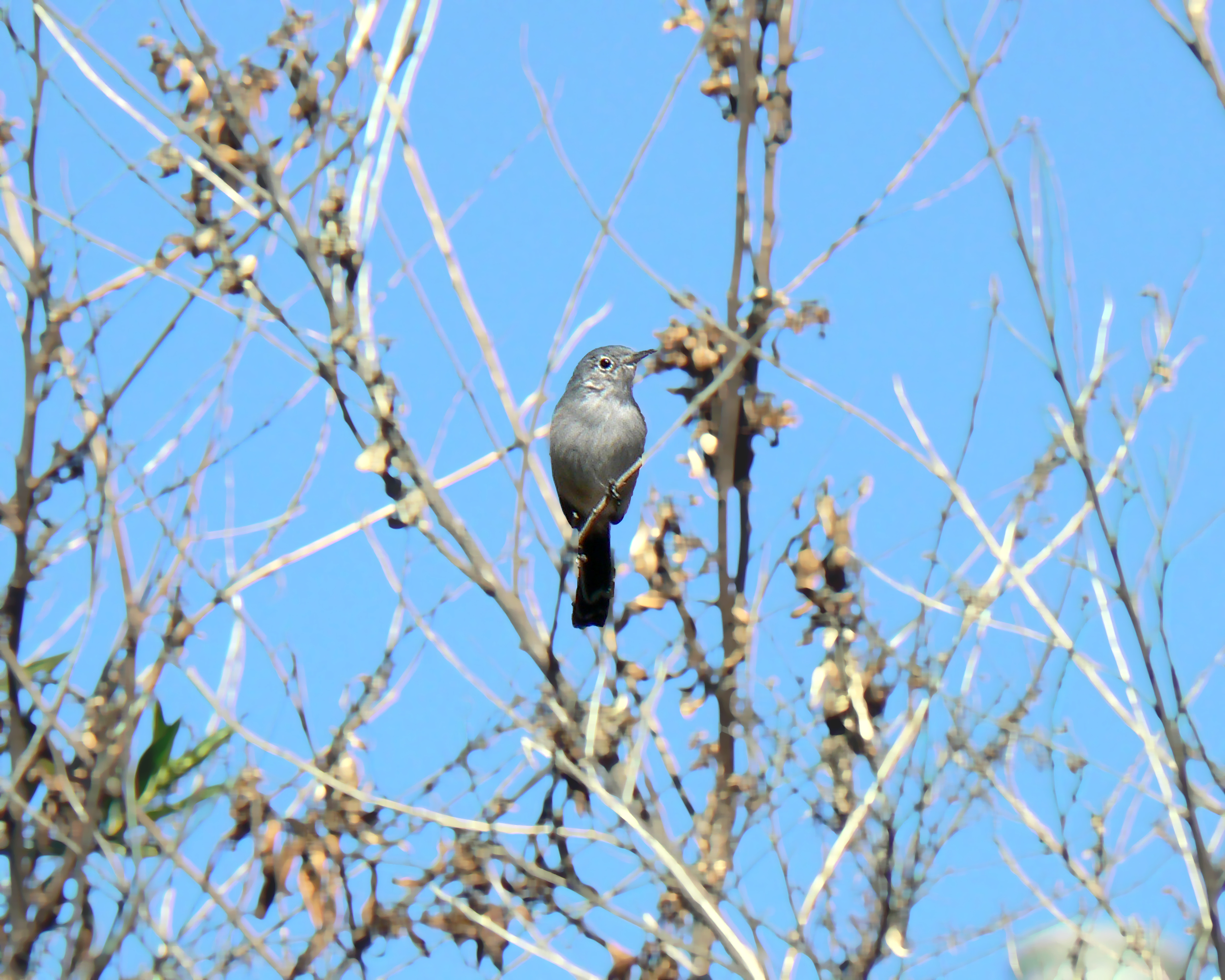

- Threatened (ESA)

Scientific classification
- Kingdom: Animalia
- Phylum: Chordata
- Class: Aves
- Order: Passeriformes
- Family: Polioptilidae
- Genus: Polioptila
- Species: P. californica
- Subspecies: P. c. californica

Trinomial name
- Polioptila californica californica Brewster, 1881

= Coastal California gnatcatcher =

Subspecies of bird

The coastal California gnatcatcher (Polioptila californica californica) is a small non-migratory songbird. It is the northernmost subspecies of the California gnatcatcher, and it lives in and around coastal sage scrub. This songbird has black, gray, and white feathers, and eats mainly insects. It often lives alone but joins with other birds in winter groups. Its call sounds like a kitten meowing, a rising and falling zeeeeer, zeeeeer.

== Physical characteristics ==
The coastal California gnatcatcher is a small songbird that measures 4.5 inches (11 cm) and weighs up to .2 ounces (6 grams). It has dark grey feathers on its back, and light gray and white feathers on its chest. The wings are brownish, and the long tail is mostly black with a few white outer feathers. Gnatcatchers have a thin, small bill and white eye rings. Male gnatcatchers develop a black cap during the summer that is not present in the winter months.

== Diet ==
The diet of the coastal California gnatcatcher includes mostly insects. Some insects include ants, flies, moths, true bugs, beetles, caterpillars, and spiders.

== Habitat and range ==
=== Historical habitat ===
California records show that the historic habitat of the Gnatcatcher was most likely Southern California. The rest of the population was in Baja California, Mexico.

=== Current habitat ===
The gnatcatcher is currently found in and around the coastal sage scrub. The gnatcatcher is non-migratory, and because of this it is only found in coastal southern California and northwestern Mexico. Its range in California includes Ventura and San Bernardino counties. Within North-Western Mexico, its range goes to El Rosario, although is mostly centered in Baja California.

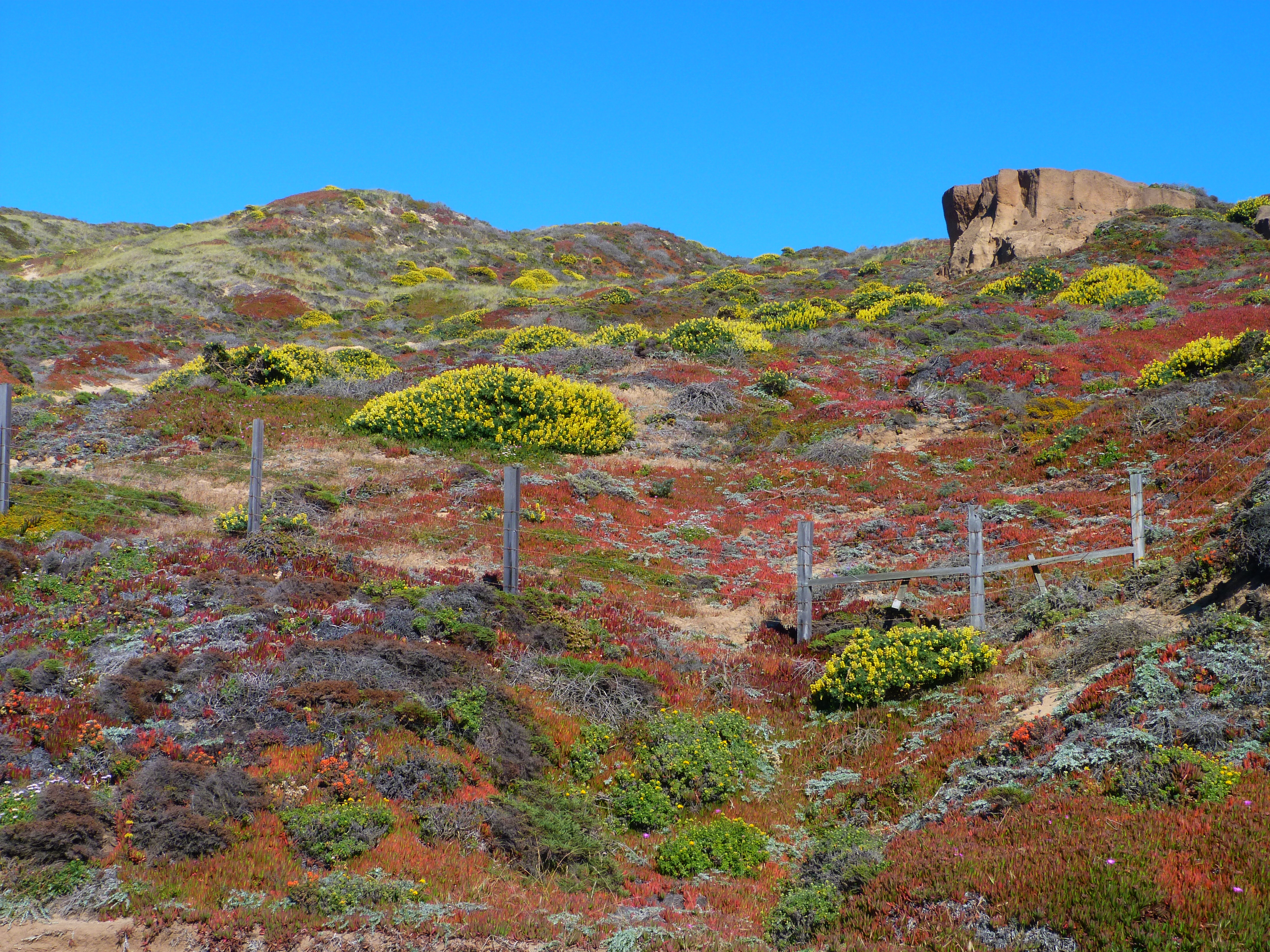
Coastal sage scrub, the habitat of the coastal California gnatcatcher

=== Current critical habitat ===
The initial critical habitat was determined by a resolution in 2003, and it was then decreased by a revision done in 2007. This final revision includes 197,303 ac (79,846 ha) of land in San Diego, Orange, Riverside, San Bernardino, Los Angeles, and Ventura Counties, California.

== Historical and present population size ==
The coastal California gnatcatcher was listed as a threatened species in 1993. The population was estimated to be no more than 1,000 to 1,500 pairs in the United States. It has since grown thanks to protections from the ESA and conservation efforts.

In 2010 the U.S. population estimate for the Gnatcatcher was 1,324 pairs within a 111,006-acres region. There was no specific estimate for Baja California, Mexico.

== Lifespan ==
=== Reproduction ===
The coastal California gnatcatcher is territorial. It protects breeding territories ranging from 1 to 6 hectares (2–14 acres). The home range size of the Gnatcatcher changes seasonally and geographically. The winter season ranges are larger than breeding season ranges. The coastal subspecies has a smaller total range than their inland counterparts. The breeding season begins in late February and runs through July, though it can run later. Most Gnatcatchers begin to build their nests between mid-March and mid-May. The nests are generally made up of grasses, bark strips, small leaves, spider webs, and down. Nests are built over a four to ten day period usually in the coastal sage scrub. The Coastal California Gnatcatcher lays on average 4 eggs at a time. The hatching and early growth periods for the fledglings last about 14 to 16 days. Male and female Gnatcatchers are both involved in all parts of the breeding process. The Gnatcatcher rarely give birth to two clutches of offspring in one nesting season. However it does rapidly renest following the loss of eggs or fledglings to predators.

=== Fledgling years ===
Several months after leaving their birth nest fledglings are dependent on or closely located to their parents. The movement of fledglings occurs over a path of plants, such as sage scrub. This provides food and shelter requirements. This path of sage scrub may also connect to larger areas of sage scrub which could be used for future nests.

The movement of fledglings away from the parent nest assists in the exchange of genetic material. This allows for gnatcatchers to settle again in previously damaged areas. The gnatcatcher is nonmigratory and territorial. so fledglings must be able to find new nesting areas of their own for the offspring to flourish. Fledgling gnatcatchers can spread out distances up to 22 kilometers (14 miles) away from their parents across broken up sage scrub.

== Endangered Species Act listing ==
While the International Union for Conservation of Nature considers the coastal California gnatcatcher a least-concern species, the coastal California gnatcatcher was petitioned to be listed as a threatened species as defined by the Endangered Species Act of 1973 (ESA). The petitions stated that the gnatcatcher's population size was very low and the critical habitat had shrunk greatly. The petitions also stated that the critical habitat had also broken into pieces due to human activities. The broken up habitat caused the Gnatcatcher to be even more at risk of destruction. It is likely that the death of many Gnatcatchers in the United States also affected the population of Gnatcatchers in Mexico. Finally, the petitions claimed that existing regulations and protections were not good enough. They stated that more strict management and rules were needed to protect the Gnatcatcher and its habitat. The final listing date for the original classification was March 20, 1993.

On December 19, 2007, the gnatcatcher's critical habitat was reduced. In 2010, there was a five-year review done by an office of the U.S. Fish and Wildlife Service in Carlsbad, California. Attempts were made to delist this species in 2014–15. The initial petition was approved, but a later review concluded that delisting was unwarranted. This species has never been delisted.

== Major threats ==
The main danger to survival of the coastal California gnatcatcher is human activity. The coastal sage scrub once covered about 2.5 million acres of California. (Barbour and Major 1988). Recent studies show that up to 90% of the Gnatcatcher habitat has been destroyed as a result of urban and agricultural development. Continued human expansion into coastal sage scrub, will negatively affect the remaining habitat.

The main natural impact is wildfires that destroy coastal sage scrub, shrinking the gnatcatcher's habitat.

== Current conservation efforts ==
There are some state laws and policies that affect the coastal California gnatcatcher: California Environmental Quality Act (CEQA), The Natural Community Conservation Planning (NCCP) Act, and Regulatory Mechanisms in Mexico.

There have been some unsuccessful efforts to remove the gnatcatcher from the Endangered Species Act to reduce its protections. In the summer of 2016, a 12-month federal investigation was done in response to a petition to delist the gnatcatcher. The results of the investigation showed that the gnatcatcher should not be removed from the ESA. The investigation involved a status review of the species. And unexpectedly, more than 39,000 letters were submitted. These were mostly by those against the delisting of the gnatcatcher.

On July 3, 2019, a federal court threw out a lawsuit trying to remove the gnatcatcher from the ESA. Thus continuing to make sure the Gnatcatcher is protected. This came after years of attempts by industry developers to remove the gnatcatcher from the ESA. The status of the Gnatcatcher as a protected species has been under attack from those who want to take advantage of their habitat. However the government has been able to defend these attacks and keep protections for the gnatcatcher.
