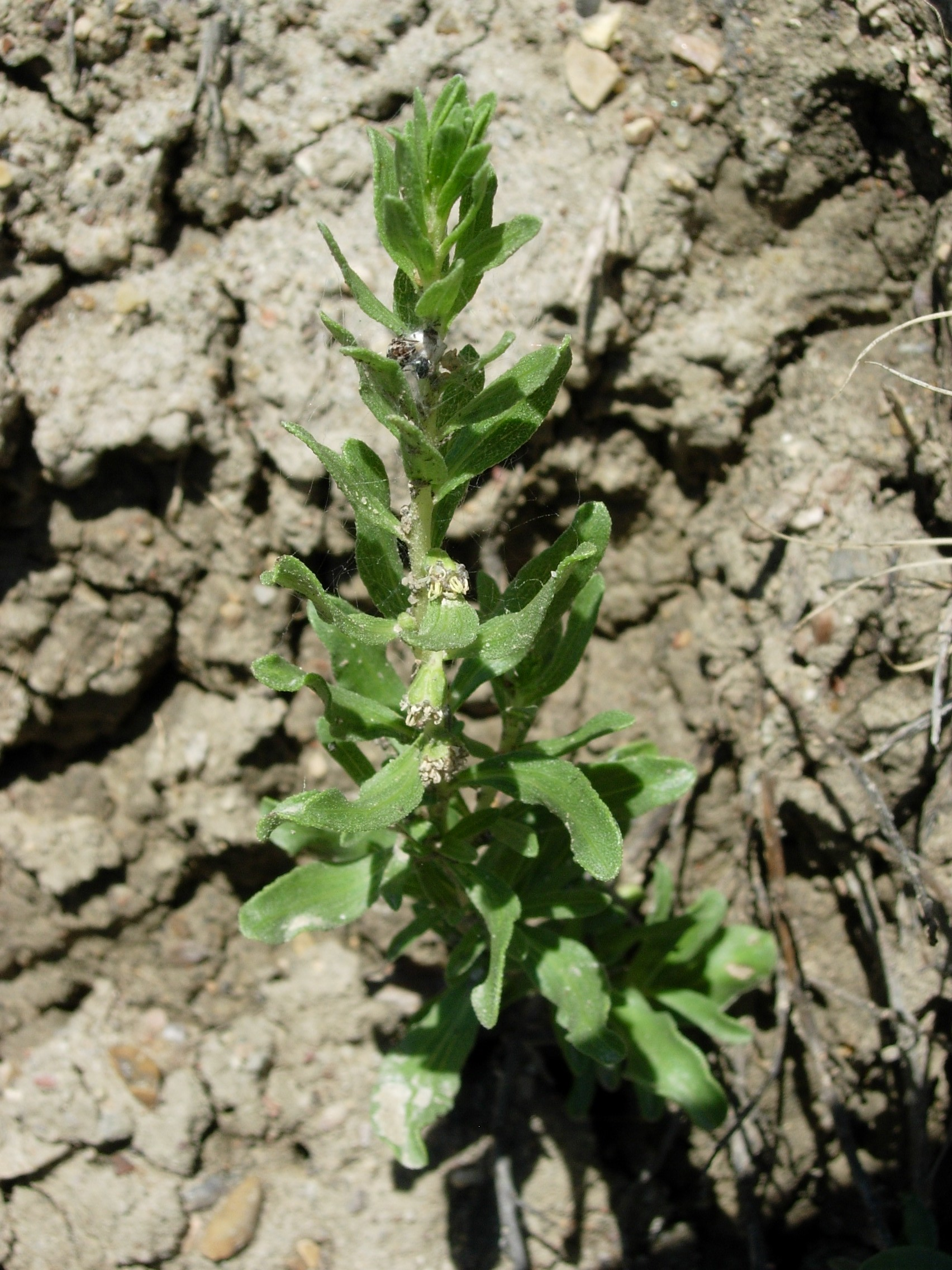

Conservation status
- Secure (NatureServe)

Scientific classification
- Kingdom: Plantae
- Clade: Tracheophytes
- Clade: Angiosperms
- Clade: Eudicots
- Clade: Asterids
- Order: Asterales
- Family: Asteraceae
- Tribe: Heliantheae
- Genus: Iva
- Species: I. axillaris

Binomial name
- Iva axillaris Pursh 1813

Synonyms
- Iva axillaris var. robustior Hook.

= Iva axillaris =

North American flowering plant

Iva axillaris, called povertyweed or death weed, is a North American species of flowering plants in the family Asteraceae. It grows in the western and central United States and in western Canada, from British Columbia south to California and east as far as the western Great Plains in the Texas Panhandle, Nebraska, the Dakotas, and Manitoba. It has also become established in Australia, where it is considered a weed.

Iva axillaris is a wind-pollinated herb up to 60 cm (2 feet) tall, spreading by means of underground rhizomes. It has many small, lance-shaped leaves rarely more than 45 mm (1.8 inches) long. Flowers are set in the axils of the leaves rather than congregated at the tips of branches as in related species. Each head can contain 9-12 florets. Flowers bloom May to October.
