= Pellicer Creek =

Stream in Florida, U.S.

Coordinates: 29°39′44″N 81°13′55″W

Location
- Country: United States
- State: Florida
- Counties: St. Johns and Flagler

Physical characteristics
- Source
  - location: Swamps west of Interstate 95
- Mouth
  - location: Matanzas River
- Length: 6 miles (9.7 km)

Basin features
- Progression: Matanzas River → Atlantic Ocean
- Designation: Florida Designated Paddling Trail

Pellicer Creek is a stream in the U.S. state of Florida. It is a tributary to the Matanzas River, and delineates the border between St. Johns and Flagler counties in the northeastern part of the state. The creek begins as a blackwater stream in the swamps west of Interstate 95, and meanders eastward into the Matanzas River; it is part of Florida's Designated Paddling Trail System.

Pellicer Creek was named after Francisco Pellicer, an early settler from the island of Menorca off the coast of Spain. Lumber was transported on the waterway from a sawmill owned by British master carpenter John Hewitt to the Matanzas River and then northward to St. Augustine. In 1770, Hewitt had purchased 1,000 acres (4.0 km^{2}) of land near the Kings' Road, where he built his water-driven mill, in operation from 1770 to 1813.

== History ==
According to the archaeologists Dana Ste.Claire and Christina Cole, evidence from pre-Columbian sites indicates that the Pellicer Creek basin was used by Indigenous populations for "subsistence, habitation, and religious/ceremonial practices". They describe the substantial shell middens lining the mouth of the creek in the lower basin as refuse heaps that represent food-gathering activities over thousands of years, while the upper basin sites were used mainly for "habitation and as ceremonial centers".

Patricia C. Griffin, an anthropologist and historian, writes that archaeological work performed at Faver-Dykes State Park in 2000 confirms that people of European descent occupied the area during the First Spanish Period, British Period, Second Spanish Period, and the Territorial Period. Building remains were located and building foundations were excavated; artifacts uncovered include San Luis polychrome Majolica, tin-enameled earthenware, olive jar fragments, and other pottery. Also found were iron pots and military items.

Beginning in the 1760s, the British founded a naval stores industry in northern Florida to procure timber for their ships—including the harvesting of yellow pine for masts and live oak for bowstems, as well as extracting turpentine from the living pine trees, along with pine tar and pitch for caulking the hulls and preserving their sails and the rope rigging. During the British period (1763-1783), the British Crown granted lands to a building contractor in St. Augustine, John Hewitt, who constructed the steeple for the Anglican St. Peter's Church there. The King's Road passed through these lands, and near the road he built a sawmill on Hulett’s Branch, a tributary of Pellicer Creek. His sawmill was the first commercial enterprise in the area. The sawmill probably supplied lumber for his construction projects in the town, and was in operation from the 1770s until 1813, when it was razed by marauders in the so-called "Patriot War".

A thorough archaeological field survey of the site of John Hewitt's up-and-down sash sawmill in present-day Flagler County was conducted in 1977 by William M. Jones, an avocational archaeologist from Jacksonville, Florida. Jones recorded his excavations and published most of his findings in an article for El Escribano, the journal of the St. Augustine Historical Society. Jones refers to William Gerard de Brahm, the British Surveyor General at the time, listing the Hulett Branch area as a "Fit Place for a Mill". He writes that the banks on either side of the Sawmill Swamp rise to a height of 3 to 4 meters (9.8 to 13.1 ft), and says that when he started his survey of the site in June 1977, the only visible indications of early activity were two borrow pits, an earthern dam across the swamp, and the remains of a structure. In the ensuing months he discovered a buried wooden platform, a trash pit, and numerous metal artifacts. Artifacts from the site are on display at the Florida Agricultural Museum.

=== Francisco Pellicer ===
Spain regained Florida from the British in 1783, and during the Second Spanish Period, 1784-1821, the Spanish governors of La Florida made a series of land grants to private owners. Francisco Pellicer was among the original grantees, and established a plantation of 1,100 acres (4.5 km^{2}) on the south bank of Pellicer Creek in about 1790, acquiring title to it in 1815. He used the forced labor of enslaved Black persons to clear and cultivate the land and erect buildings. Pellicer likely cultivated oranges. Paul Weaver writes that the Spanish built an elaborate defense system centered at St. Augustine during the Patriot War of 1812; it included fortifications in areas more remote from the city, among them a fortified house called "Pellicer's" near Pellicer's Creek.

=== Cherokee Grove ===
As described by Weaver and Jones, Cherokee Grove is the complex of structures and buildings located on the south bank of Pellicer Creek near the confluence of Pellicer Creek and the Matanzas River. The complex is situated in a mature oak hammock and is surrounded by the Princess Place Preserve, a Flagler county-owned park of approximately 1,435 acres. The site is a part of the original Francisco Pellicer Grant, deeded in the 1790s. Occupied historically by a plantation and orange groves, the land is now mostly cleared. The complex consists of a lodge, servants' quarters, an in-ground artesian well-fed swimming pool, pool houses, a horse barn, and an ice house. The lodge, constructed in 1888, is a one and one-half story wood frame building. It has a pier foundation, tabby block masonry exterior cladding, and a hip roof, and is surrounded by a wraparound veranda.

=== The Cutting Lodge at the Princess Estate ===
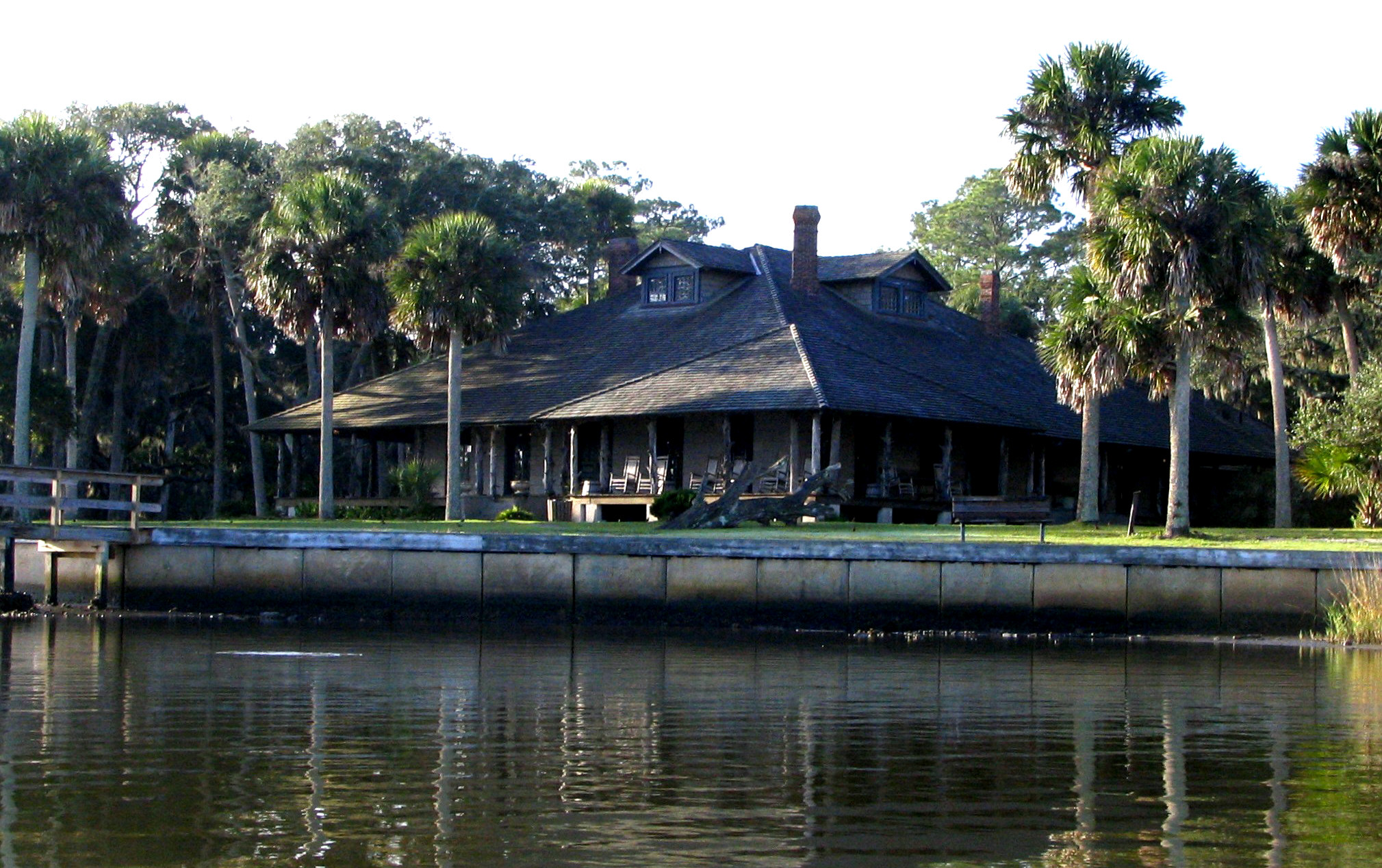
Lodge at Princess Place Preserve in Adirondack Camp Style

As recounted by Weaver, the east coast of Florida became a tourist attraction and a winter resort for affluent northerners during the late 19th century. Seasonal residents and tourists initially flocked to St. Augustine in the winter, and some wealthy northerners bought large tracts of land in undeveloped areas like Flagler County and developed these rural properties as their personal estates. During the 1880s, a rich sportsman from New England, Henry Cutting, bought part of the Francisco Pellicer land grant and built a substantial hunting lodge on the south side of Pellicer Creek. The lodge, now "the most architecturally and historically significant building in Flagler County", was designed by New York architect William Wright in the Adirondack Camp Style. Other amenities on the property included tennis courts, riding stables, and one of Florida‟s first in-ground swimming pools. Cutting's estate attracted wealthy and socially prominent families from New England and Chicago, as well as royalty and dignitaries from around the world. After his death, his widow Angela married a member of a Russian noble family, Boris Scherbatow, an exiled prince, after which the property was called the Princess Estate. Flagler County began acquiring the property in 1993, and the Princess Place Preserve was dedicated in August 1994.

== Physical geography ==
Pellicer Creek is located approximately 16 miles south of the city of St. Augustine. The creek borders the northeast section of Flagler County and the southeast section of St. Johns County. The general topography of this area is composed of ancient marine terraces running parallel to the Atlantic Ocean shoreline that formed during the Pleistocene epoch. The 505-acre (2.04 km^{2}) Pellicer Creek Aquatic Preserve was established in 1970 by the Florida state legislature to protect its salt marshes and wildlife habitat from development. The preserve includes only state-owned submerged lands below the mean high water mark. It borders U.S. Highway 1, and extends approximately four miles (6.4 km) eastward to the Matanzas River. The Silver Bluff terrace occurs within the boundaries of the Pellicer Creek preserve at an altitude between sea level and ten feet above sea level. Outside of the preserve boundaries, the Pamlico terrace rises from 5 to 25 feet (1.5 to 7.6 m) above sea level.

According to the site profile of the Guana Tolomato Matanzas National Estuarine Research Reserve, Pellicer Creek is "one of the last undisturbed tidal marsh creek systems along the east coast of Florida", and a major contributor of freshwater to the southern portion of the Matanzas River. Most of the watershed in the Pellicer Creek basin is drained by small creeks or branches. Among these, Hulett Branch, Schoolhouse Branch, Pringle Branch, Dave Branch, and Stevens Branch drain into the Pellicer Creek Aquatic Preserve from the west. Rootan Branch flows southward from the north through Faver-Dykes State Park and drains into Pellicer Creek, while Styles Creek flows from the south into Pellicer Creek, close to the Matanzas River.

== Flora and fauna ==
According to the Pellicer Creek Aquatic Preserve Management Plan, wildlife species found at Pellicer Creek include:

=== Birds ===
- Brown pelican (Pelecanus occidentalis)
- Little blue heron (Egretta caerulea)
- Louisiana heron (Egretta tricolor)
- Snowy egret (Egretta thula)
- Reddish egret (Egretta rufescens)
- Limpkin (Aramus guarauna)
- American oystercatcher (Haematopus palliatus)
- Least tern (Sterna antillarum)
- Bald eagle (Haliaeetus leucocephalus)
- Wood stork (Mycteria americana)

=== Mammals ===
- West Indian manatee (Trichechus manatus)

=== Reptiles ===
- American alligator (Alligator mississippiensis)

=== Fish ===
- Atlantic sturgeon (Acipenser oxyrinchus)
- Common snook (Centropomus undecimalis)
