= Hurricane Irene (1999) =

Category 2 Atlantic hurricane

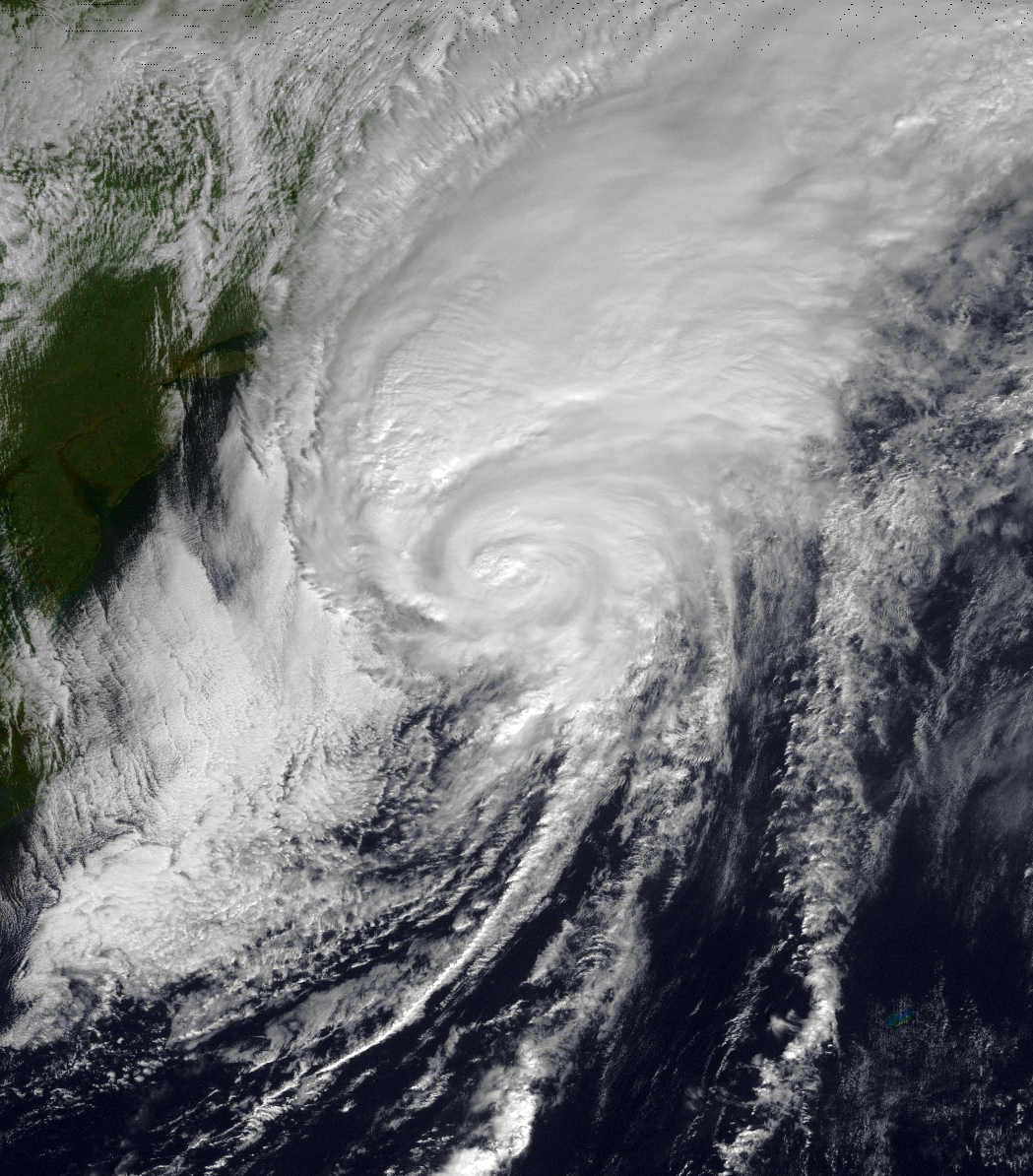
- Irene near peak intensity on October 18

Meteorological history
- Formed: October 13, 1999
- Extratropical: October 19, 1999
- Dissipated: October 24, 1999

Category 2 hurricane
- 1-minute sustained (SSHWS/NWS)
- Highest winds: 110 mph (175 km/h)
- Lowest pressure: 958 mbar (hPa); 28.29 inHg

Overall effects
- Fatalities: 19 (3 direct, 16 indirect)
- Damage: $800 million (1999 USD)
- Areas affected: Cuba, Bahamas, Florida, North Carolina, Virginia
- IBTrACS
- Part of the 1999 Atlantic hurricane season

Hurricane Irene produced somewhat heavy damage across southern Florida in October 1999. The ninth named storm and the sixth hurricane of the season, Irene developed in the western Caribbean Sea on October 13 from a tropical wave. It moved northward, hitting western Cuba before attaining hurricane status. Irene struck Florida on October 15 as a Category 1 on the Saffir–Simpson Hurricane Scale, first at Key West and later near Cape Sable. The storm moved across the state and tracked northward over the Gulf Stream. It approached the Carolinas but remained offshore. Irene turned eastward and significantly intensified into a strong Category 2 hurricane on October 18. By the following day, the system became extratropical due to cooler waters to the southeast of Newfoundland and was quickly absorbed by another extratropical low.

The hurricane first produced heavy rainfall across western Cuba, causing four deaths and damage. Irene was a wet Florida hurricane in October, similar to many hurricanes of the 1930s and 1940s. It later dropped 10 to 20 inches (254 to 508 millimetres) of rainfall in the Miami metropolitan area, causing urban flooding unseen since Hurricane Dennis in 1981. Despite being only a Category 1 hurricane, Irene caused eight indirect deaths and $800 million (1999 USD) (Note: All damage figures are in 1999 USD, unless otherwise noted.) in damage across Florida. The hurricane produced flooding and caused one death in the northwestern Bahamas. In North Carolina and Virginia, Irene produced over 10 inches (250 mm) of rain, adding more flooding after previous hurricanes Dennis and Floyd. The flooding closed many roads and caused rivers to crest past their banks, though the damage in the area was relatively minor.

== Meteorological history ==
Map plotting the storm's track and intensity, according to the Saffir–Simpson scale Map key Saffir–Simpson scale Tropical depression (≤38 mph, ≤62 km/h) Tropical storm (39–73 mph, 63–118 km/h) Category 1 (74–95 mph, 119–153 km/h) Category 2 (96–110 mph, 154–177 km/h) Category 3 (111–129 mph, 178–208 km/h) Category 4 (130–156 mph, 209–251 km/h) Category 5 (≥157 mph, ≥252 km/h) Unknown Storm type Tropical cyclone Subtropical cyclone Extratropical cyclone, remnant low, tropical disturbance, or monsoon depression

A broad area of low pressure formed over the western Caribbean Sea on October 8, and it persisted until October 11, when a tropical wave reached the area and caused the convection to organize, resulting in the development of a low-level circulation. Convection increased and organized around the circulation center late on October 12, and the system organized into Tropical Depression Thirteen at 06:00 UTC on October 13 off the north coast of Honduras. The depression strengthened further over the favorable conditions present in the Caribbean Sea, and attained tropical storm status six hours later, when it was assigned the name Irene. Operationally, the National Hurricane Center (NHC) continued to classify the system as a low-pressure area until 15:00 UTC on October 13, by which time it had already reached tropical storm status.

Tropical Storm Irene strengthened as it moved northward and reached sustained winds of 70 mph (110 km/h) early on October 14. The NHC operationally upgraded Irene to a hurricane on October 14, although later analysis after the hurricane season, including an examination of satellite imagery and observations from weather stations in Cuba, indicated it remained a tropical storm until later. Irene continued to move towards the north-northeast, crossed over the western portion of the Isla de la Juventud as a strong tropical storm, and around 19:00 UTC, it struck mainland Cuba near Batabanó in Mayabeque Province. The cyclone emerged into the Straits of Florida several hours later and resumed intensification, and Irene attained hurricane status early on October 15. It passed over Key West around 13:00 UTC, turned more to the north-northeast, and struck mainland Florida at Cape Sable as an 80 mph (130 km/h) hurricane around 20:00 UTC. Despite Irene strengthening prior to landfall in the state, wind shear caused deep convection to remain mostly displaced to the storm's east side in a semicircular pattern around the center. However, as the hurricane moved northeastward across southeast Florida, deep convection noticeably shifted farther west, likely as a result of a westward movement of the low-level convergence zone due to increased friction. The convergence zone's shift also caused Irene's eye to become better defined.

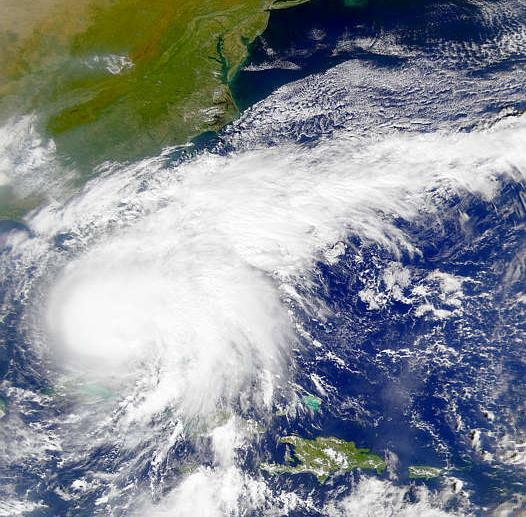
Hurricane Irene near landfall in Florida.

Irene entered the Atlantic Ocean near Jupiter, Florida, early on October 16, still as a Category 1 hurricane. It turned to the north, remained a hurricane despite little convection, then turned to the northeast in response to an approaching upper-level trough. Just offshore, Irene moved parallel to the coastlines of South Carolina and North Carolina on October 17. While interacting with very warm ocean waters and the upper-level trough on the following day, Irene rapidly intensified, reaching maximum sustained winds of 110 mph (180 km/h) with a minimum barometric pressure of 958 mbar (28.3 inHg), a Category 2 hurricane, at 07:56 UTC. Despite its strength, the circulation was very asymmetrical, and the convection was not particularly organized. The hurricane continued to accelerate to the northeast, steadily weakening until becoming extratropical early on October 19 to the south of Newfoundland. However, the upper-level trough, its associated upper-level jet streak, and warm air advected from the storm resulted in a baroclinic effect, allowing Irene to maintain much of its convection during and following its extratropical transition in spite of decreasing sea surface temperatures. The extratropical storm continued to the northeast until becoming absorbed by another, larger extratropical storm late on October 19.

== Preparations ==
In Cuba, slightly over 228,000 residents were evacuated from low-lying areas before the storm. Around 10% stayed in temporary shelters, while the rest stayed with family or friends. Included in the evacuation total were 6,000 tourists and over 1,000 residents in rickety houses. Workers protected tobacco leaves by moving them to sealed warehouses, and transported cattle and livestock to higher ground. The hurricane forced the closure of schools and the cancellation of some flights. The Cuban government issued a hurricane watch for Pinar del Río Province, Havana, Havana Province, and Isla de la Juventud 21 hours before Irene hit. These areas, along with Matanzas Province, were upgraded to a hurricane warning 15 hours before Irene hit the area.

Initially, forecasters predicted Irene to parallel the west coast of Florida, weakening to a tropical storm before making landfall on the west-central portion of the state. However, when a more eastward track became evident, officials in Monroe, Charlotte, Lee, and Manatee Counties issued evacuation orders for people in mobile homes and recreational vehicles. In addition, Key West issued a curfew during the storm's onslaught. The National Hurricane Center issued a hurricane warning from Florida City around the Florida Peninsula to Boca Grande, including all the Florida Keys and the Dry Tortugas. A tropical storm warning was also issued from Florida City northward to Savannah, Georgia. In addition, the majority of flights during Irene's passage were cancelled in Miami International Airport. Governor Jeb Bush declared a state of emergency on Florida the day before Irene made landfall, and ordered for the activation of the Florida National Guard to aid in disaster efforts.

While moving northward off the coast of Florida, Irene was initially expected to make landfall along the South Carolina coastline, prompting the National Hurricane Center to issue a hurricane warning from Edisto Beach, South Carolina to Cape Hatteras, North Carolina. Because of this, voluntary evacuation orders were issued for portions of South Carolina. However, when the track shifted further to the east, mandatory evacuation orders were issued for coastal areas of North Carolina, with tens of thousands removed from their homes. The evacuation order included several beach towns; those living in low-lying areas and mobile homes were advised to seek shelter. In addition, many of those left homeless from Hurricane Floyd's passage just weeks before were evacuated to shelters. Jim Hunt, the Governor of North Carolina, declared a state of emergency, with the state's emergency management team switching from a recovery objective towards a preparations mission.

== Impact ==
Storm deaths by region
Region	Direct	Indirect	Total
Cuba	2	2	4
Florida	0	8	8
Bahamas	1	4	5
North Carolina	0	1	1
New Jersey	0	1	1
Total	3	16	19

=== Cuba ===
While crossing Cuba, Irene produced heavy rainfall, totaling as high as 35.6 inches (900 mm) in Manaca-Iznaga. Further, at least 10.7 inches (270 mm) of rain was noted at Playa Girón in Matanzas Province, while many other locations reported more than 7 inches (178 mm). The Casablanca section of Havana also observed 4.8 inches (120 mm) of precipitation and a peak wind gust of 78 mph (126 km/h). Abnormally high tides generated by the storm overtopped the Malecón seawall in Havana, inundating nearby low-lying areas and prompting the evacuation of several hundred people.

The flooding caused by Irene damaged more than 471,000 acres (1,910 km^{2}) of sugar cane and 39,000 acres (160 km^{2}) of banana plantations. Irene's rainfall also flooded tobacco fields. Throughout the country, Irene's rainfall damaged 27,336 houses and caused the total loss of 730. At least one-third of the city of Havana lost electricity. In all, four people were killed by the storm in Cuba, two of whom in Havana due to electrocution.

=== Florida ===
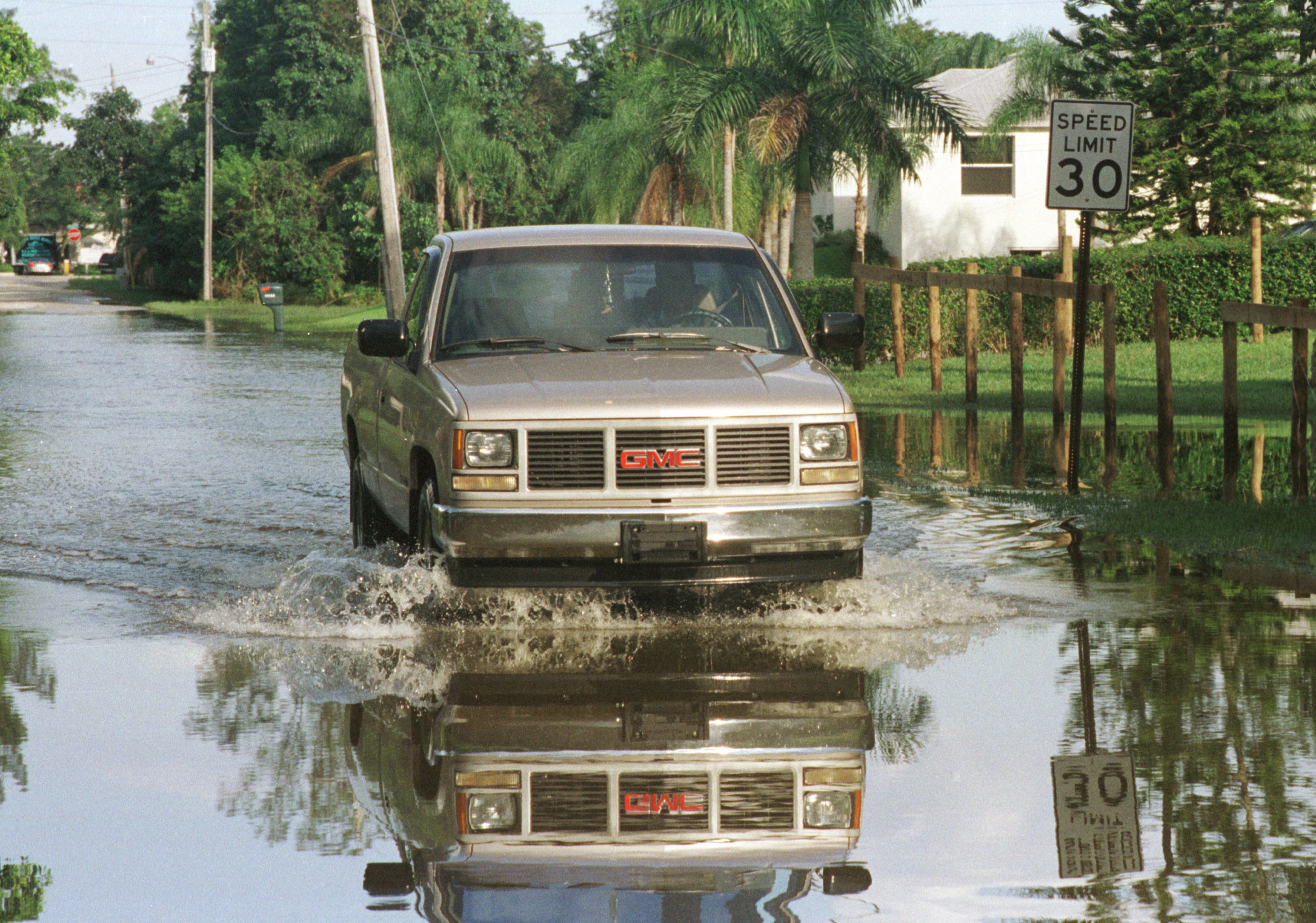
Flooding from Irene

While moving through the Florida Keys, Irene produced a storm surge of up to 2.3 feet (0.70 m) in Key Vaca, while Key West reported a surge of 1.5 feet (0.46 m). The hurricane produced sustained winds peaking at 79 mph (127 km/h); it also produced strong gusts, the strongest of which was clocked at 102 mph (164 km/h) at Big Pine Key. Irene produced heavy rainfall in the Keys, including 12 inches (300 mm) of rain in Key West. The rainfall flooded roads throughout the Keys, prompting officials to close 50 miles (80 km) of U.S. Highway 1. Irene spawned a tornado in Islamorada, causing heavy damage to three houses. Moderate wind gusts caused power outages throughout the Keys, but damage was overall minor. Overall, Irene left 81 homes uninhabitable in Monroe County.

Because Irene continued northeastward after making landfall at Cape Sable, Southwest Florida reported little impact, mostly limited to a few downed trees, palm frons, and power lines in Collier and Lee counties. In Everglades City, however, a seafood store lost its entire roof. Despite moving across the state as a minimal hurricane, there were no observations of sustained hurricane-force winds on mainland Florida. The highest official recorded wind report was 60 mph (97 km/h) in Miami Beach, while the highest accurate wind gust was 71 mph (114 km/h) in Vero Beach. In addition to the National Weather Service Reports, the South Florida Water Management District reported higher wind gusts near Lake Okeechobee of up to 93 mph (150 km/h) in Belle Glade, though these were likely caused by small-scale meso-cyclone-induced downbursts. Irene produced heavy rainfall across southeastern Florida, peaking at 17.45 inches (443 mm) at Boynton Beach, though many areas in the Miami metropolitan area received from 10 to 15 inches (254 to 381 millimetres). One F1 and three F0 tornadoes touched down in Broward and Palm Beach counties, injuring three people.

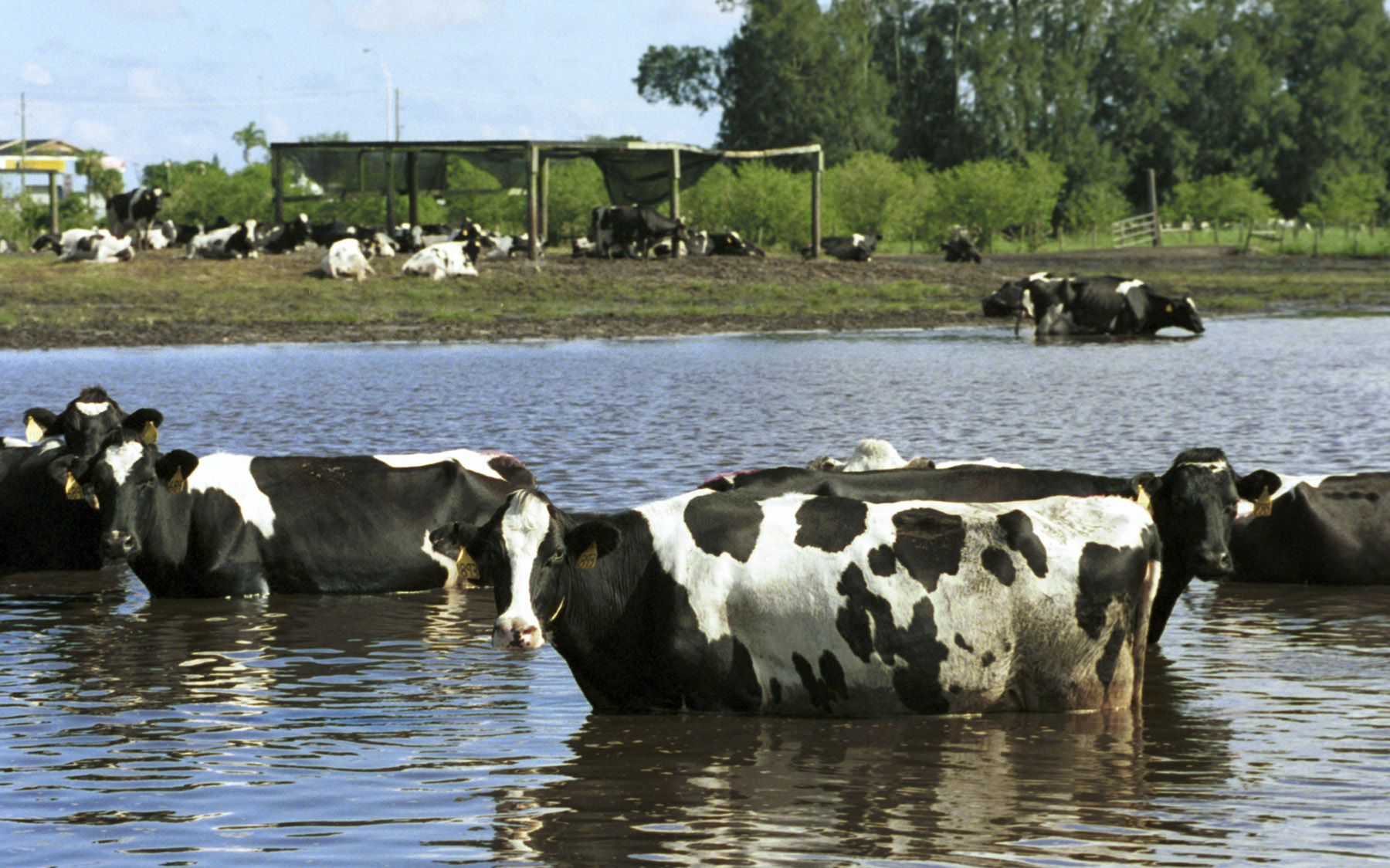
Cattle walking in flood waters

Strong wind gusts left 700,000 people without power from Miami to West Palm Beach, including the National Hurricane Center. The center briefly lost power, but during an hour and a half delay to reboot the computers, they obtained information from computers in the Mid-West and Washington, D.C. Officials from the Florida Power & Light Company were unable to repair power lines due to strong wind gusts, while Irene's flooding submerged underground lines, preventing repairs until the waters subsided. Five people, including three in one family, were killed when they walked through electrified waters due to downed power lines. The rains from Irene flooded roads and canals, stalling numerous cars. Three people drowned when they drove their vehicles into the canals. The floodwaters persisted for nearly a week in areas, displacing hundreds from their homes and isolating thousands. Property damage in southeastern Florida added up to $262 million, which included damage to approximately 1,200 homes in Broward County and 879 in Miami-Dade County. The storm also demolished or nearly demolished 225 residences in Palm Beach County.

Alex Penelas (mayor of Miami-Dade County) and Jose "Pepe" Diaz (mayor of Sweetwater) inspect local flooding on October 16

Additionally, Irene caused severe agricultural damage in southeastern Florida adding up to $338 million, approximately $75 million of which occurred to crops alone in Miami-Dade County. Impacts to crops and farming also accounted for the vast majority of Palm Beach County's overall damage total of about $100 million. Floodwaters killed 30 cattle at one farm, though the owners protected the rest of their 1,700 cattle by raising the feeding areas above the flood plain. According to an initial estimate, the flooding destroyed between 5% and 15% of fruit groves along its path. The flooding delayed the winter planting of corn and bell peppers and damaged tomato plants, forcing Miami-Dade County growers to replant damaged crops. The hurricane also damaged sugar cane, vegetables, and citrus crops, with citrus canker spreading after the storm passed through the area. A U.S. Sugar processing mill in Bryant suffered about $4 million in damage after winds demolished two cooling towers and toppled some of the facility's walls. The company also lost around 500,000 boxes worth of oranges, equivalent to roughly 90% of its orange crops.

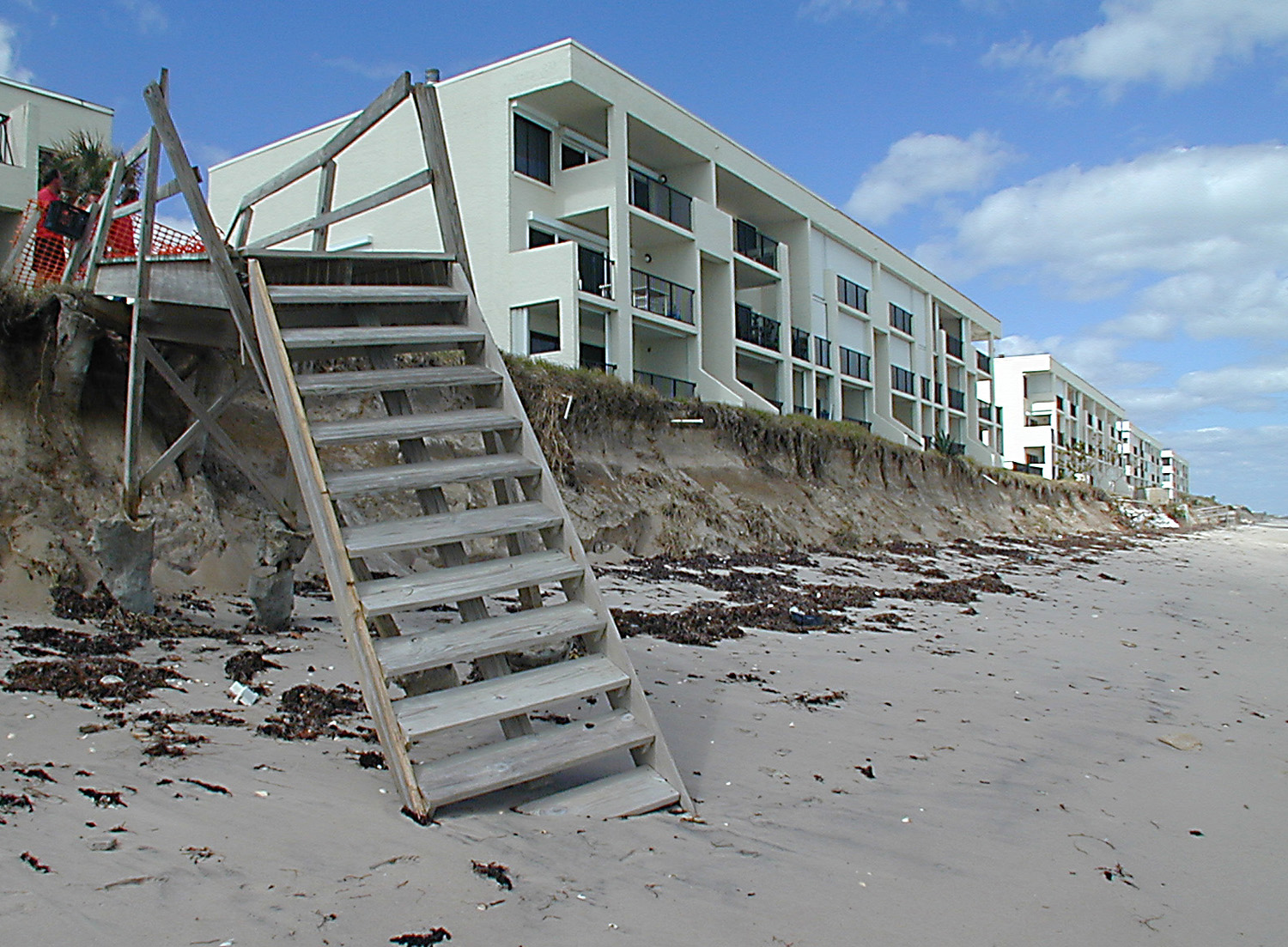
Beach erosion from Irene

After moderate beach erosion from previous hurricanes Dennis and Floyd, Irene caused significant beach erosion on the eastern Florida coastline. The erosion exposed the foundations of private homes, leaving some uninhabitable. Beach erosion damage in east Central Florida totaled to $21 million. Access to many beaches was closed for more sand to be brought in, or until the stairways were rebuilt. Strong north winds and high seas severely destroyed or damaged docks in the Indian River Lagoon. Heavy rainfall, ranging from 5 to 9 inches (127 to 229 mm) in Martin and St. Lucie counties flooded 260 homes. Strong wind gusts from 60 to 70 mph (97 to 113 km/h) severely damaged 34 houses and caused light damage to 1,114 homes in Martin, St. Lucie, and Brevard counties. In addition the winds damaged 465 mobile homes, 15 severely, and destroyed one. A total of 555 commercial buildings also experienced light damage, and gusty winds downed about 1,000 trees. Rough seas broke a large barge free from its mooring into a bridge on Florida Highway 528. Property damage throughout Martin, St. Lucie, Indian River, Brevard, and Volusia counties totaled about $51 million.

Farther north, the First Coast region reported mostly minor wind, erosion, and coastal flood impacts. In Flagler County, the hurricane caused severe damage to four homes, and minor damage to 173 houses and 18 businesses, including to the large archway and a roof covering a spectator seating area at the Marineland theme park. Coastal flooding led to the closure of State Road A1A near the town. Much of southern St. Johns County experienced additional severe erosion in the wake of Hurricane Floyd, leaving minor damage to some structures.

=== Bahamas ===
Hurricane Irene passed near the northwestern Bahamas, causing moderate flooding. A tornado spawned by the storm on Abaco island deroofed a home, resulting in one death. Four indirect fatalities occurred during a heavy rain when four persons in a truck that drove off a wet pier drowned.

=== Carolinas and Mid-Atlantic ===
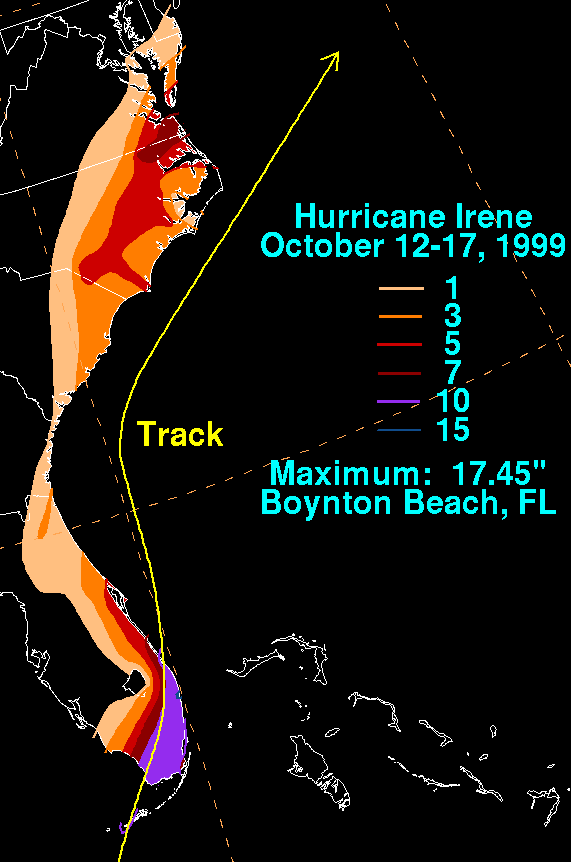
Rainfall from Irene

Hurricane Irene dropped moderate rainfall ranging from 5 to 6 inches (125 to 150 mm) in eastern South Carolina. The flooding closed several roads, including some in western Georgetown County which were washed out. Moderate wind gusts of up to 48 mph (77 km/h) in Charleston downed trees and power lines, causing sporadic power outages. The winds also caused minor beach erosion along the coastline.

While paralleling the coast of North Carolina, Irene produced heavy rainfall across the state, peaking at 11 inches (280 mm) in Ernul with several other locations reporting over 6 inches (150 mm). The rainfall caused severe river flooding in North Carolina, many of which had not receded from Hurricane Floyd's passage less than a month earlier. Due to the runoff, the Tar, Cape Fear, and Neuse Rivers all crested above their banks. The flooding also caused a dam in south-central Hoke County to overflow. Irene spawned two tornadoes; an F0 in Onslow County and an F2 in Weeksville. The F2 destroyed two trailers, damaged several houses, and injured one person. The heavy flooding closed several roads throughout North Carolina, causing several traffic accidents. Hurricane Irene was indirectly responsible for one death when a man hydroplaned on a wet road and crashed. Despite the severe flooding, Hurricane Irene caused little damage in North Carolina.

Hurricane Irene also produced heavy rainfall in southeastern Virginia of up to 12 inches (300 mm) in Chesapeake, where floodwaters entered some homes. Additionally, widespread street flooding occurred, with a total 17 sections of road closed in Southampton County and Suffolk alone. Additionally, over 100 cars suffered water damage in Norfolk, which also reported numerous traffic accidents. Precipitation in Delaware ranged from 1 inch (25 mm) in Kent County to almost 4 inches (100 mm) in Selbyville, located along the state's southern end. The rainfall caused some flooding in poor drainage areas, but little damage occurred. Over southern New Jersey, the storm dropped up to 2.5 inches (64 mm) of rain in Beach Haven, while radar estimates indicated that up to 3 inches (76 mm) fell in some areas. Farther north, Irene produced wind gusts of 40 to 50 mph (64 to 80 km/h) in the northern portions of the state. In the city of Englewood, a 400 lb (180 kg), unmounted security gate fell, killing an 87-year-old woman. A combination of Irene and an approaching cold front produced approximately 2 to 4 inches (51 to 102 mm) of rainfall and gusts between 45 and 55 mph (72 and 89 km/h) over coastal areas of Massachusetts, while a peak total of 5.37 inches (136 mm) precipitation fell and gusts reached 60 mph (97 km/h) on Nantucket. Winds toppled trees branches and power lines, while a tree fell on a car, causing minor injuries to its two occupants.

=== Canada ===
As an extratropical cyclone, the remnants of Irene brought gusty winds, heavy rains, and snow to Newfoundland, especially the central and western parts of the island. The towns of Corner Brook, Stephenville, and Twillingate reported widespread power outages.

== Aftermath ==
Following the hurricane, the International Red Cross and Red Crescent Movement launched an emergency appeal for Cuba. The appeal raised $217,498 (1999 CHF) to supply hygiene items, household goods, water purification tablets, and water containers to the 12,000 living in temporary shelters. The appeal asked for repair supplies and to improve the response capacity of the national society for future disasters. The Cuban Red Cross mobilized over 4,500 volunteers to the affected areas to provide first aid to injured, distribute meals and medical supplies, and collaborate with blood banks. The government-controlled media broadcast system guaranteed repair items, though many people remained in damaged houses in the weeks after the storm.

Just days after Irene moved through Florida, President Bill Clinton declared 18 counties as disaster areas. The declaration allowed affected businesses and homeowners to apply for federal assistance, such as money for temporary housing, minor home repairs, or disaster-related expenses. In addition, the president issued an emergency declaration for Florida, which released federal resources to aid in debris removal and emergency services. Due to the crop damage, the U.S. Department of Agriculture declared Broward, Collier, Miami-Dade, and Monroe counties as disaster areas. This qualified eligible farmers for low-interest emergency loans. In addition, President Clinton declared the 66 counties in North Carolina eligible for assistance due to Hurricane Floyd were also eligible for more assistance due to damage from Irene.

In the Bahamas, township volunteers assisted in cleanup efforts. The Royal Bahamas Defence Force distributed hurricane relief supplies to those affected.

Despite the storm's high impact, the name Irene was not retired in the spring of 2000, and was used again in the 2005 season, but would be retired following its usage in the 2011 season.

== See also ==
- Other tropical cyclones named Irene
- Hurricane Gladys (1968) – a hurricane that took a similar track, causing moderate damage throughout its path
- List of Atlantic hurricanes
- List of wettest tropical cyclones in Cuba since 1963
- List of Florida hurricanes
