= Guana Tolomato Matanzas National Estuarine Research Reserve =

Protected area in Florida, United States

- GTM Research Reserve
- IUCN category IV (habitat/species management area)
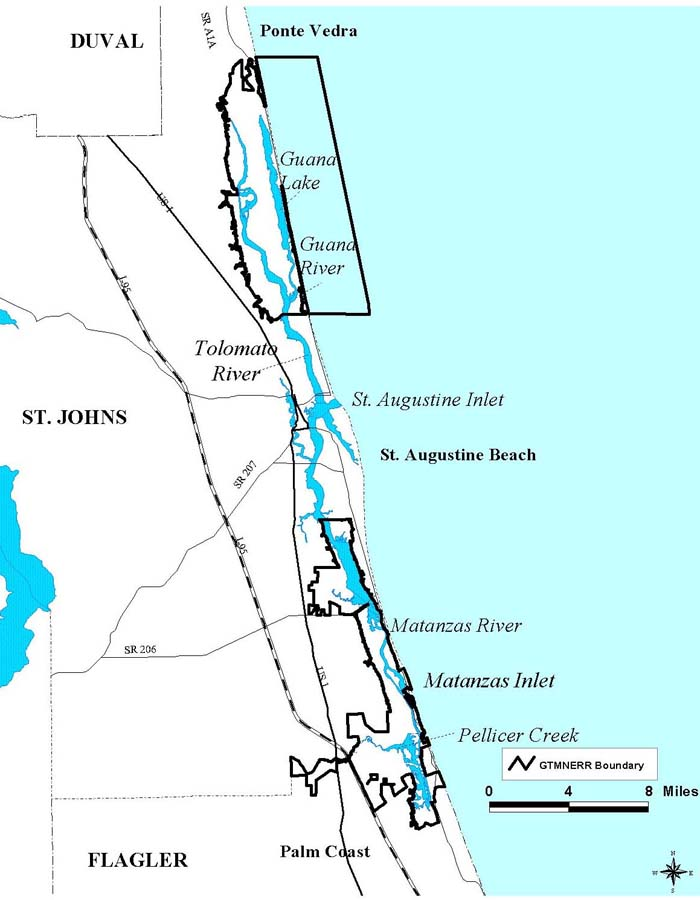
- Guana Tolomato Matanzas National Estuarine Research Reserve - Map
- Location: St. Johns and Flagler counties, Florida, United States
- Nearest city: St. Augustine
- Coordinates: 29.988°N 81.347°W
- Area: 73,256 acres (29,646 ha)
- Established: 1999
- Website: http://www.dep.state.fl.us/coastal/sites/gtm/ http://www.gtmnerr.org

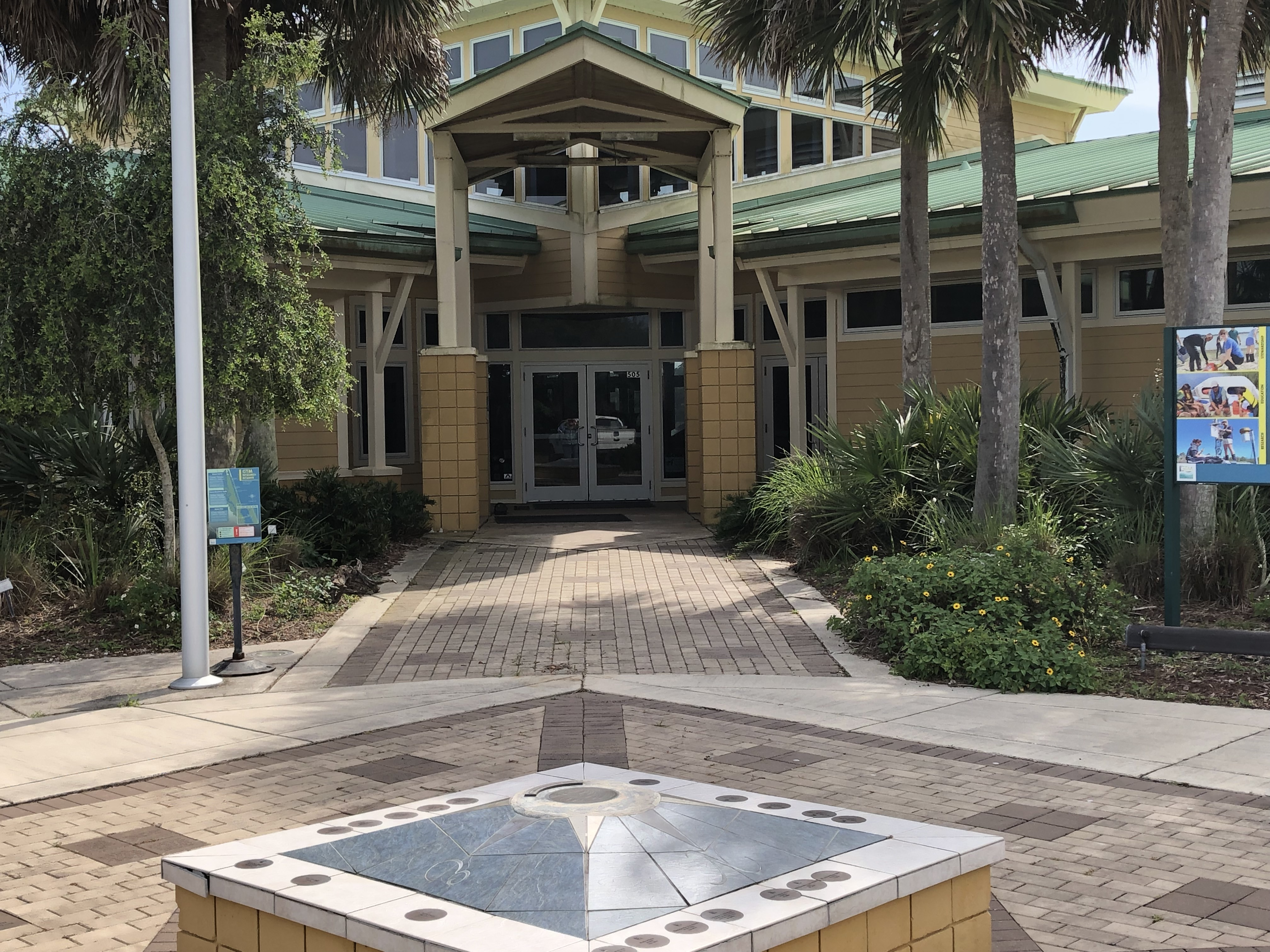
GTM Research Reserve Visitor Center

Guana Tolomato Matanzas National Estuarine Research Reserve (GTM Research Reserve) is in St. Johns and Flagler counties, Florida. Designated in 1999, it is part of the National Oceanic and Atmospheric Administration (NOAA) National Estuarine Research Reserve (NERR) system. Lands in the area were acquired from Gate Petroleum and became Guana River State Park before being acquired by the Research Reserve in 2004.

The GTM Research Reserve represents the east Florida sub-region of the Carolinian bioregion. It is one of 30 NERRs in 23 states and one territory. GTM is one of three NERRs in Florida and is administered on behalf of the state by the Florida Department of Environmental Protection's Florida Coastal Office as part of a network that includes forty-one aquatic preserves, three NERRs, a National Marine Sanctuary, the Coral Reef Conservation Program and the Florida Oceans and Coastal Council. Additional interests are held in the research and management of the GTM and connected preserved or conserved lands including:

- National Oceanic and Atmospheric Administration
- Friends of the GTM
- Florida Fish and Wildlife Commission
- Florida and US Department of Environmental Protection
- University of North Florida, Whitney Laboratory, Marineland
- State, National, Federal, City park systems
- St. Johns River Water Management District
- State and Federal Forestry Service

== Overview ==
The GTM Research Reserve boundary encompasses 76,760 acres along the Guana, Tolomato, and Matanzas rivers, and the Atlantic Coast. Its mission is "to achieve the conservation of natural biodiversity and cultural resources by using the results of research and monitoring to guide science-based stewardship and education strategies". The GTM Research Reserve was officially designated on August 19, 1999.

A portion of the GTM Research Reserve north of St. Augustine, Florida was formerly known as Guana River State Park. The upland areas include pine flatwoods, maritime hammock, coastal strands and dunes, and mangroves. It is also an important calving ground for the endangered North Atlantic right whale, in addition to being home to aquatic and amphibious wildlife like dolphins, manatees, sea turtles, gopher tortoises, American alligators, indigo snakes and river otters. There are also peregrine falcons, bald eagles, and the endangered Anastasia Island beach mouse (Peromyscus polionotus phasma). Diving and wading birds such as brown and white pelicans, wood storks, and roseate spoonbills can also be viewed.

== GTM Research Reserve Visitor Center ==
The GTM Research Reserve Visitor Center is located at 505 Guana River Road in Ponte Vedra Beach, Florida. It is in the northern component of GTM Research Reserve, ten miles north of St. Augustine on State Road A1A in Ponte Vedra Beach, and serves as the administrative, education, research, and stewardship facilities for the northern component of GTM Research Reserve.

The southern component of GTM Research Reserve consists of Pellicer Creek Aquatic Preserve, Faver-Dykes State Park, Washington Oaks Gardens State Park, Moses Creek Conservation Area, Pellicer Creek Conservation Area, Fort Matanzas National Monument, Matanzas State Forest, Princess Place Preserve, The River to Sea Preserve at Marineland, Marsh View Preserve, and other state sovereign submerged lands adjacent to the Matanzas River within its boundary. There is a smaller office building on A1A within the River to Sea Preserve in Marineland.

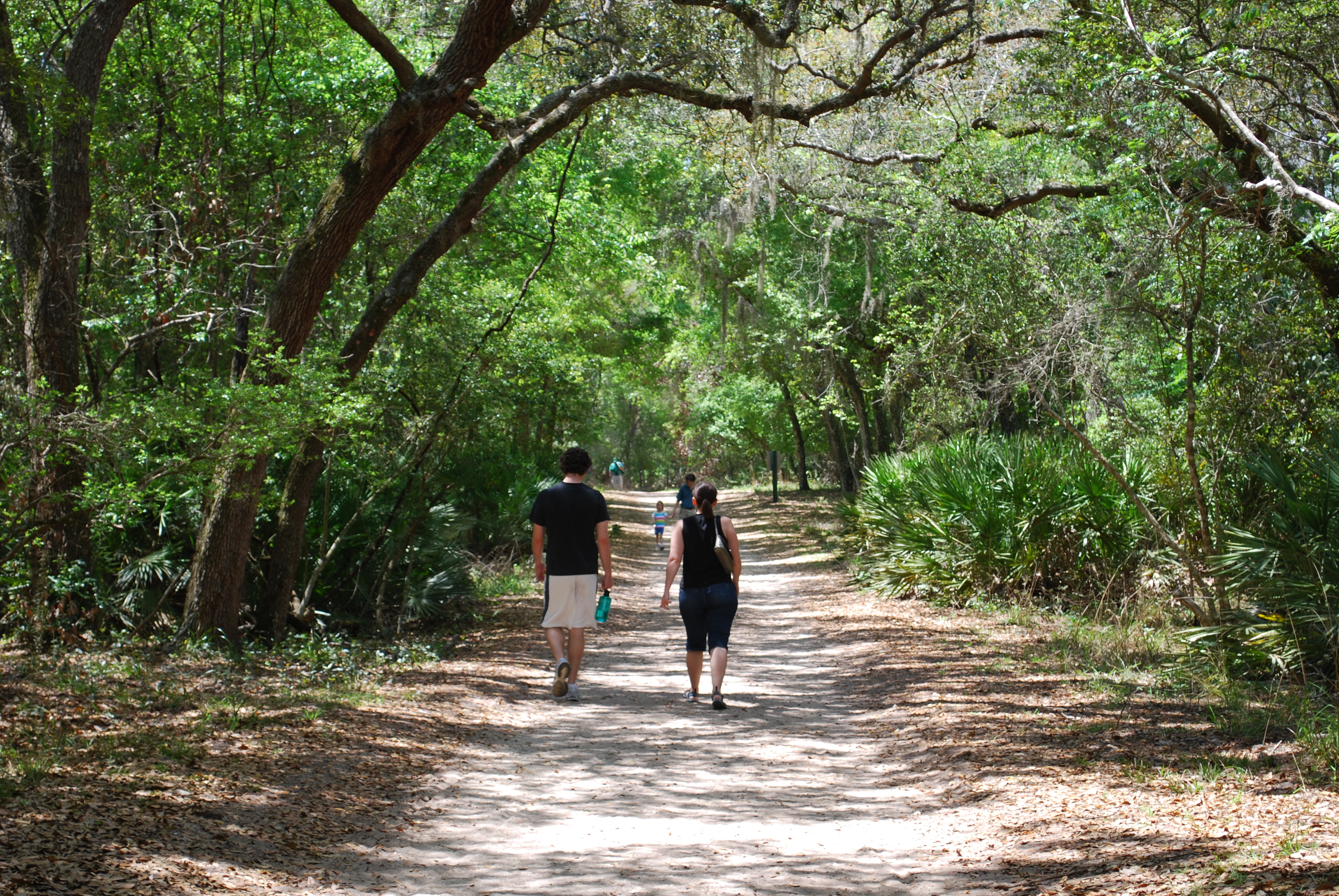
Family walking on one of GTM Research Reserve's trails

== Recreational activities ==
There are a lot of recreational activities available like hiking, bicycling, fishing, kayaking and canoeing, dog walking, horseback riding, picnicking, bird watching and nature viewing. Amenities include over nine miles (14 km) of nature trails in an unspoiled natural setting. The reserve also contains seventeen archaeological sites, shell middens at Shell Bluff Landing and Wright's Landing, as well as a prehistoric earthen burial mound. Kayak, bicycle, and fishing boats are available for rent to explore the reserve.

== History ==
The tract was privately owned and open to the public for hunting and fishing prior to state acquisition. During the period of private ownership, the Guana River was dammed in 1957, to flood the upstream marshes in order to enhance wintering waterfowl habitat. The result was the creation of the present-day Guana Lake. The lake water is brackish near its southern terminus at Guana Dam and gradually turns into a freshwater reservoir as one travels away from the dam. Both saltwater and freshwater fish species exist in the same body of water.

The land was purchased from Gate Petroleum with Conservation and Recreational Lands and Save Our Coast funds by the State of Florida in 1984 and divided into Guana River State Park and the Guana River Wildlife Management Area. In 2004 with the construction of the GTM Environmental Education Center, the management of the state park lands was turned over to the GTM Research Reserve to manage as part of the larger research reserve.

=== Guana Tract ===
In 2004 the Guana River State Park was acquired by the Guana Tolomato Matanzas National Estuarine Research Reserve and is now included in the reserve. It is no longer a State Park. The research reserve is located along State Highway A1A, between St. Augustine and Jacksonville. Bounded by the Atlantic Ocean and the Intracoastal Waterway (Tolomato River), the Guana Tract, which includes the Guana Tolomato Matanzas National Estuarine Research Reserve (GTM Research Reserve) and Guana River Wildlife Management Area, comprises some 12,000 acres (49 km^{2}) of public conservation and recreational uplands.

== See also ==
- Saint Johns River
- Matanzas River
