= Marineland of Florida =

Marine park in the United States

- U.S. National Register of Historic Places
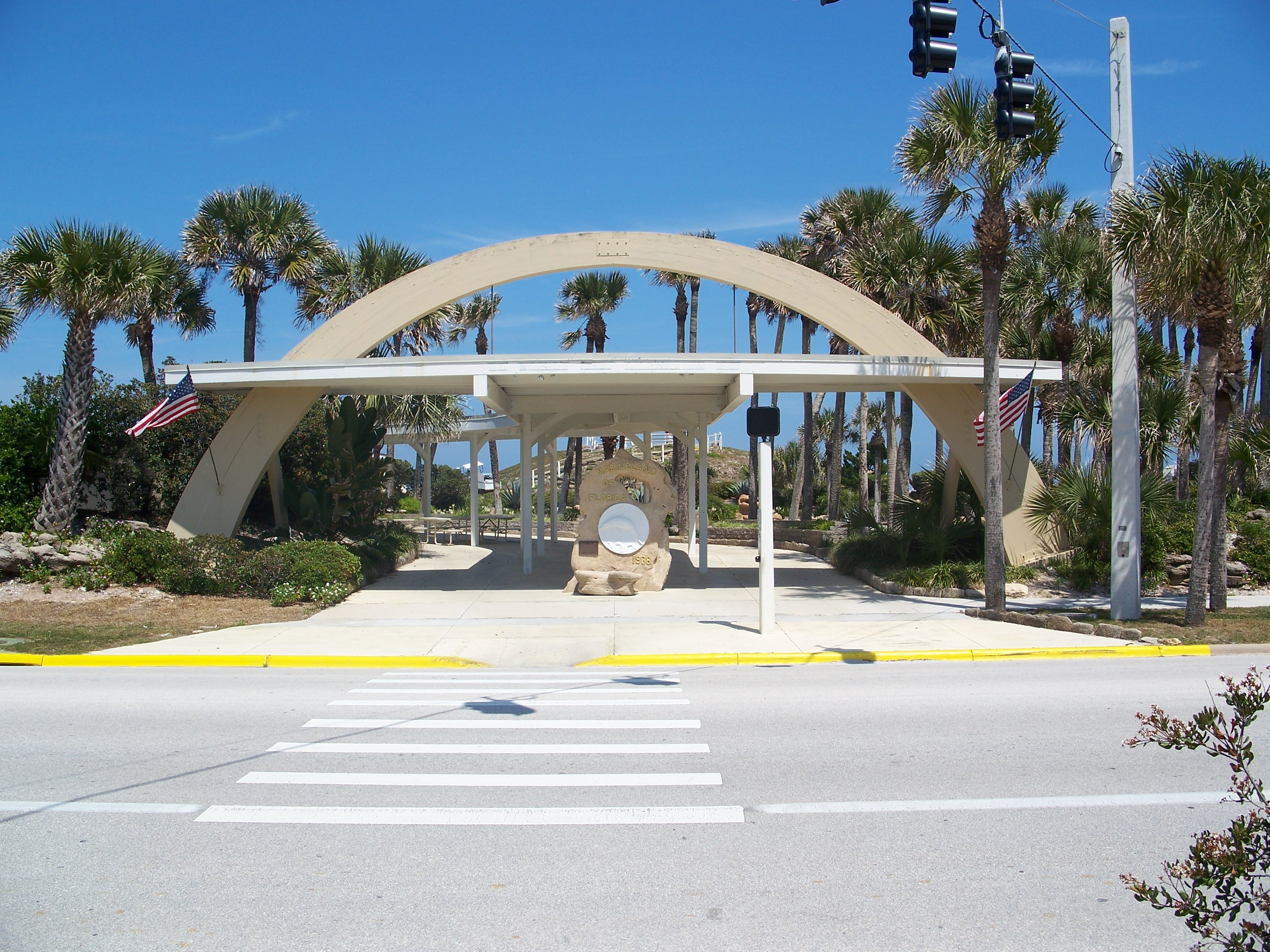

- Location within Florida Location within the United States
- Location: Marineland, Florida, US
- Coordinates: 29°40′6″N 81°12′46″W
- Built: 1937
- Architect: John Walter Wood and M.F. Hasbrouch
- Architectural style: Moderne style
- Website: marineland.net
- NRHP reference No.: 86000831
- Added to NRHP: April 14, 1986

Marineland of Florida (usually just called Marineland, also Marineland Dolphin Adventure), is the first marine mammal park, and is billed as "the world's first oceanarium". Marineland functions as a non-profit education and conservation focused facility with guest interaction programs. Marineland, in its current form, reopened to the public on March 4, 2006 (charging the original 1938 admission price of one dollar). In 2011, the park was purchased by the Georgia Aquarium for a reported $9.1 million. It is currently managed as a non-profit facility dedicated to research, education and conservation under the management of Marineland Waves of the Future.

== History ==
=== Beginnings ===
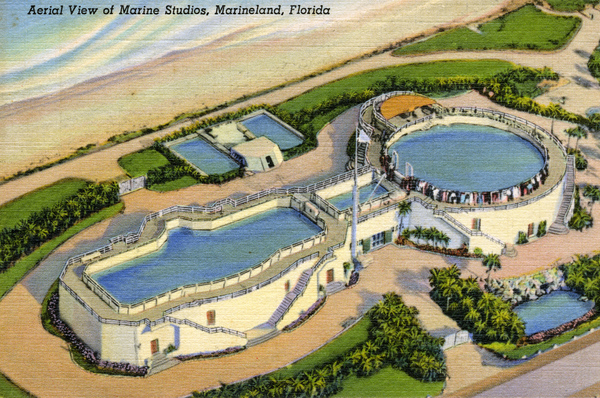
Aerial view of Marine Studios, Marineland, Florida in 1939, one year after it opened

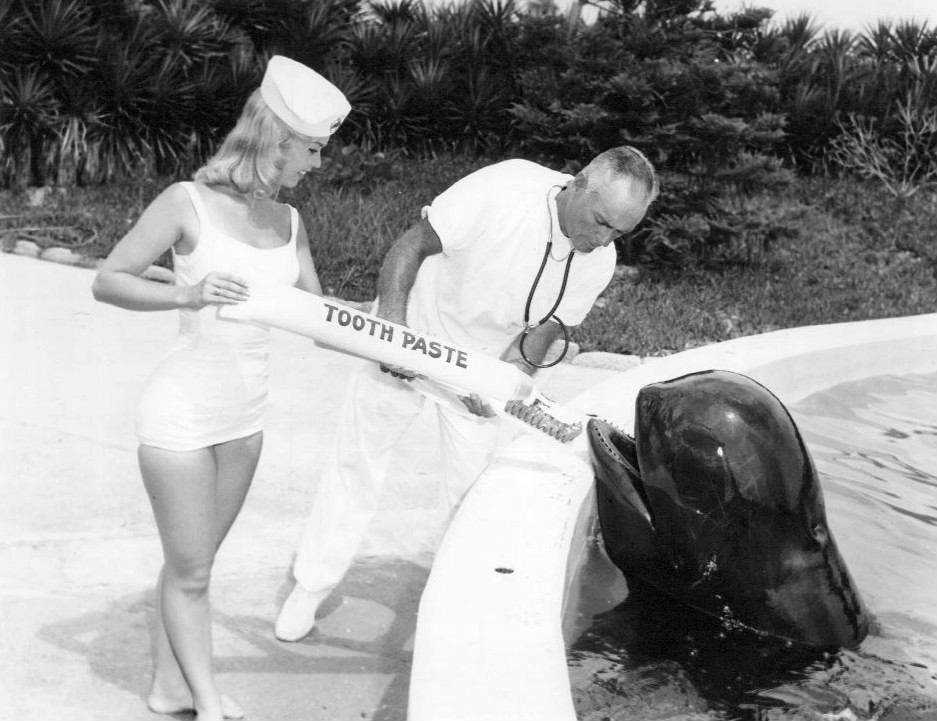
Moby the Whale gets a dental checkup, 1964.

Marineland was first conceived by W. Douglas Burden, Cornelius Vanderbilt Whitney, Sherman Pratt, and Ilya Andreyevich Tolstoy (grandson of Leo Tolstoy) as an oceanarium that could be used to film marine life. A site was selected on the Atlantic Ocean south of St. Augustine, eventually known as the town of Marineland. The site of Marineland is within a 20,000-acre (8,100 ha) grant given to London barrister Levett Blackborne in 1767. The well-connected Blackborne, grandson of Sir Richard Levett, Lord Mayor of London, never settled his grant (nor even visited Florida), and eventually Blackborne's plantation was regranted to John Graham, a Georgia Loyalist fleeing the Revolutionary War. Ultimately, the land that is today Marineland was broken up over the years into smaller parcels.

Financing and construction presented challenges as Marineland was the first attempt at capturing and sustaining sea creatures. These challenges were overcome. Construction and engineering were carried out Arthur Franklin Perry Co. of Jacksonville. On June 23, 1938, "Marine Studios" (the name "Marineland of Florida" would later be adopted) began operations with its main attraction a bottlenose dolphin. Unexpectedly, over 20,000 tourists clogged Highway A1A to visit the new attraction. For many decades Marineland consisted of not only the oceanariums but several amenities including a motel (Marine Village Court, Marineland Motel and Quality Inn/Marineland); Dolphin Restaurant and Moby Dick Lounge; Periwinkle Snack Bar and Sandpiper Snack Bar; Marineland Marina; plus fruit shop and gift shop; and a pier at the north end of the facility. A Texaco service station was adjacent to the Periwinkle Snack Bar, and Greyhound Bus Lines stopped regularly during its St. Augustine to Daytona Beach run.

The total property area consisted of 125 acres (51 ha) sandwiched between the Atlantic Ocean and the Intracoastal Waterway. Originally planned for the St. Augustine area, residents of that community did not look favorably on the attraction being located there; thus the new site south of Matanzas Inlet was chosen. It is also said that Cornelius Vanderbilt Whitney chose the upper east coast of Florida due to the less frequent occurrence of hurricanes compared to other parts of Florida.

There were two large tanks as the center piece of "Marine Studios" or as they were known as a Marine Studios coined name, oceanariums. Visitors upon entering would encounter the circular oceanarium from the south. The circular oceanarium nicknamed circ tank by staff was the home of dolphins and sometimes some groupers and pelicans. The circular oceanarium held 400,000 US gallons (1,500,000 L; 330,000 imp gal) of water circulated at 3,000 US gallons (11,000 L; 2,500 imp gal) per minute. This oceanarium was also 12 feet (3.7 m) deep and 80 feet (24 m) across. with some rocks laid in on the sandy bottom. The rectangular oceanarium, nicknamed "the rec tank" by staff, held 450,000 US gallons (1,700,000 L; 370,000 imp gal) of water circulated at 2,500 US gallons (9,500 L; 2,100 imp gal) a minute. This oceanarium was home for an assortment of fish both local and tropical, sharks, eels, turtles and other marine life. Its tank was 100 feet (30 m) long and 40 feet (12 m) wide at its widest point and required two cables, bolted to the walls, across the topside to assist with structural integrity.

The rectangular oceanarium was the largest of the Marine Studios tanks, it had two 12-foot (3.7 m) deep sections, the northern and southern thirds, while the middle had a depth of 18 feet (5.5 m). The rectangular oceanarium was heated with an oil fired furnace down below deck to heat the tank during the cooler winter months to protect tropical fish. In keeping with the nautical theme of the facility a ships snorkel smokestack was on the top deck for the furnace below.

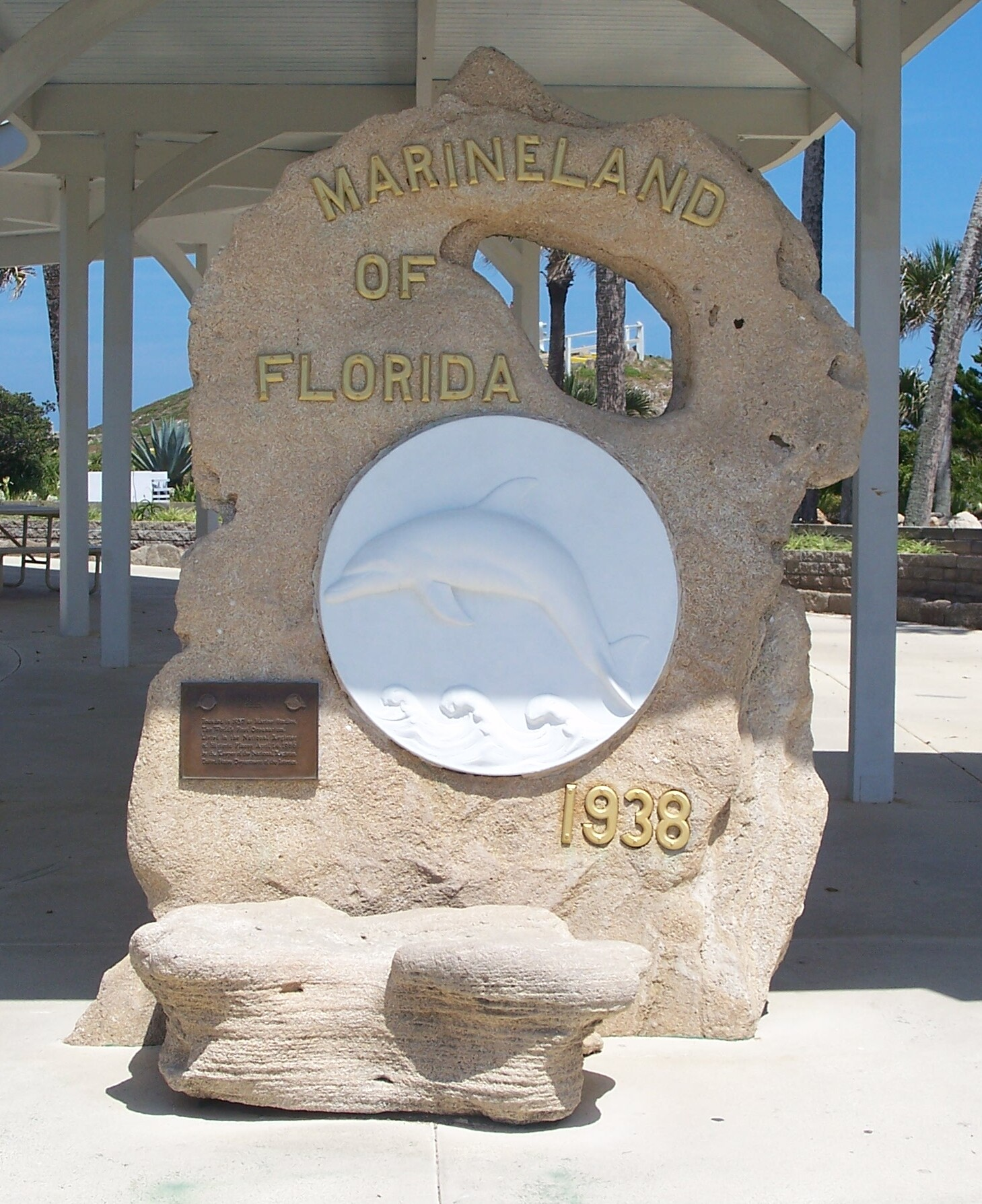
Slab of coquina at Marineland entrance

The two oceanariums were connected by "the flume", a shallow waterway between the two large tanks. The flume was gated to keep specimens in their respective tanks with water able to flow through the grated gates. The flume also was used anytime large animals needed to be moved to or from a transport vehicle. A large crane was built as part of the structure, from which nautical flags would fly, keeping the "marine" theme of the facility. Below deck, corridors surrounded the two oceanariums lined with portholes into the tanks with a central passageway on the lowest level connecting both tanks so visitors could move from one oceanarium to the other below deck.

The Aquarist Office was located on the middle deck on the south side of the circular oceanarium. All of this was considered the original "Marine Studios" including a biological station, front ticket office, announcers' booth (originally located on the top deck before being moved below deck on the central passageway), and other displays. Visitors coming in what was the original main entrance would walk under an arch that stood above a large slab of coquina rock with the words "Marine Studios 1938" on it in lettering, and up a walkway past the "Fudge Kitchen" to a ticket office at the south end of the Marine Studios structure. From there visitors could observe from the top deck of the tanks or wander the hallways below and observe through the numerous portholes in the walls of the tanks of both oceanariums.

The "porpoise stadium" with its show tank and holding tanks along with bleachers would be added in 1952 as the park rapidly expanded. The stadium would showcase "Flippy" the educated porpoise. During that time dolphins were locally known as porpoises even though a porpoise completely different type of marine mammal. The reason for this was to avoid confusing mammal dolphins with the dolphin fish, or mahi-mahi, as well as because it was widely used local slang at the time. The roof was added to the stadium in 1961 as the show and animals in it were expanded. Also in 1961, the name Marineland started being used as opposed to Marine Studios in marketing and promotion. Expansion continued as the main walkway had a roof added, then famous large arches were installed in 1968 with giant letters spelling out MARINELAND above the new stadium roof and allowed the facility to be seen from some distance off approaching north or south on A1A.

The top deck of the circular oceanarium was also reconfigured. An administration building in 1962 replacing an older one and a proper laboratory in 1953 were also constructed west of A1A as part of Marineland's growth in the 50s and 60s. Also through the 50s, maintenance and paint shops were constructed; this mostly built out the area immediately west of the "Marine Studios" structure. On the east side of A1A further additions included a large gift shop in 1954 and a fresh water exhibit built just east of the circular oceanarium in 1966. This fresh water habitat would see several uses over the years with displays of fresh water dolphins, manatees, and fresh water fish, then a conversion to salt water for "the shark nursery", a tank for smaller sharks. Eventually in the 1980s this would become "The Wonders of the Spring" showcasing fresh water fish found in Florida's springs. North of the Porpoise Stadium, a penguin display and a shallow tank were added in the area of what would be known as Whitney Park. The shallow tank saw several functions held dolphins for a while and eventually became a sea lion display with shows added in the early 1980s. Even though the park was now billing itself as Marineland, the name Marine Studios would stick for some time and the "Studios Department" which managed most of the park would last until the end of 1987.

Salt water for the tanks and oceanariums was brought in by sets of pipes that ran under the sand 50 feet (15 m) out into the ocean. Two pump stations called "galleries" pumped the water from that pipe to a filtration plant. Then the sea water was circulated through the oceanariums and out into the Intracoastal. A dedicated team of pump crews maintained the system 24 hours a day, keeping a vigilant eye on water levels and pump operations. Water was treated by copper sulfate to help reduce algae growth with lab crews monitoring the amounts used. This method of treatment was of the groundbreaking discoveries by Marineland crews and scientists.

Having the grandson of Leo Tolstoy involved in the project helped Marineland become a very fashionable destination in its early days, prompting writers Marjorie Kinnan Rawlings, John Dos Passos, and Ernest Hemingway to visit Moby Dick's Bar located there. Ms. Rawlings was married to Norton Baskin who at one time (1950s/early 1960s) was the operator and manager of the Dolphin Restaurant and the Moby Dick Lounge. The park's facilities were very popular with tourists and also used for filming numerous movies, including Creature from the Black Lagoon (1954) and Revenge of the Creature (1955).

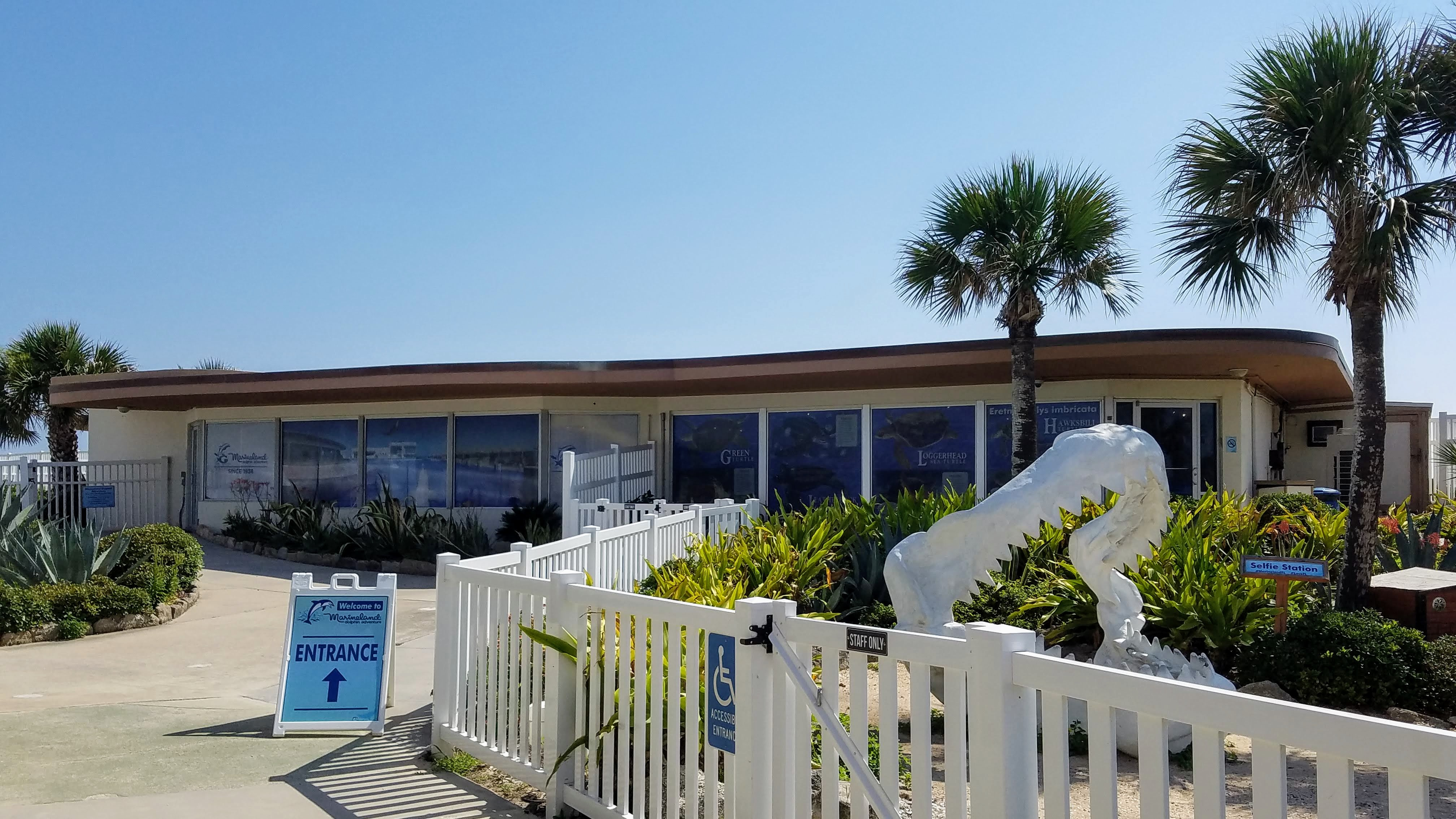
Gift shop in 2019

The first dolphin trainer in the world, Adolph Frohn, started training dolphins and developed "dolphin shows", which became an additional draw in the early 1950s as Marineland became one of Florida's major attractions, attracting over 900,000 visitors per year with peak attendance in the mid-1970s. Further expansion westward occurred at this time, including expansion of the "Sandpiper Snack Bar", with other additions including the Playport playground, the "Citrus Shop", the "Beachcomber Gift Shop", the "Shell Museum" and the "Aquarius 3D Theater". A few exhibits were added as well, moving the electric eel show to the west side of the park from the east, all of these reached by winding landscaped pathways that crossed a network of brooks and streams on wooden bridges. A centerpiece was a statue of King Neptune with dolphins in one of the larger ponds.

Little known was a hippopotamus exhibit that was built in the woods west of the duck pond area. This was never opened to the public and sat dormant for years. Additional expansion on the ocean side through the 70s included Whitney Park north of the stadium, featuring a boardwalk, exhibits, and an observation deck. The University of Florida Lab was added along with a hall and dorms in the mid-1970s on the very northwest part of the property in 1972 and 1975. The hall dubbed "Whitney Hall" would become the location of Marineland employees' annual Christmas parties, a tradition started in the early years of the attraction and continuing into the 1990s. To the south a large and expanded hotel operated by Quality Inn was built east of A1A south of the old hotel in 1976.

Divers using the Miller Dunn Style 3 Divinhood helmet would feed fish, eels, turtles and dolphins by hand and "jumpmasters" and trainers would conduct dolphin shows 6 times a day. Announcers would inform visitors of upcoming programs by ringing bells over the PA system and announcing the nautical time (in keeping with the marine theme of the park) and translating it to standard time. The pre-show and transition music played was also in keeping with the nautical theme: a combination of The Sailor's Hornpipe and Drunken Sailor instrumental mixes. The first show was presented at 9:30 am, with subsequent shows at 11:00 am, 12:30 pm, 2:00 pm, 3:30 pm and 4:50 pm (the time of the last show was shifted to 5:00 pm at some point). Each show started with the "jumping porpoises/dolphin show" on the top deck of the circular oceanarium. Here a "jumpmaster" would have dolphins leaping into the air.

When the show first started in the 1950s a platform was used, but then in the early 1970s Marineland purchased a Skyworker unit; this was essentially a bucket on a movable arm suspended from two arches that met above the tank. This device, common with utility trucks, was reportedly the first use of one upside down, another Marineland innovation. The Skyworker also used vegetable oil for its hydraulic systems, which was harmless to the dolphins. The jumpmaster could control the bucket by three levers and move it around where dolphins leaped up to 16 feet (4.9 m) above the surface of the water. The show then would transition downstairs, announcers guiding the crowds to where a hard hat diver would descend into the oceanarium and feed the marine mammals by hand as visitors viewed through 188 portholes on two levels surrounding the tank.

The diving operation always consisted of two people, a diver in the water and a person on the top deck to manage the air hose and safety monitoring. Then the underwater show moved to the rectangular oceanarium with announcers guiding the crowd from one location to the next. The diver would transfer from one tank to the other above as visitors were guided via the hallways below to view the diver in the water with potentially dangerous sharks and moray eels among the fish in the rectangular tank. There were 120 portholes on split levels in which visitors could view the show. The show would then conclude with the crowd being directed to the stadium for the "educated porpoises" where dolphins went to dolphin "school" and demonstrated their skills, guided by a team of trainers.

Daily show staffing consisted of a jumpmaster, two staff divers, two announcers and a number of stadium trainers to manage the shows. Marineland staff, especially those who worked in the "Marine Studios" department, wore nautical attire as uniforms, with jumpmasters wearing sailor suits and announcers wearing uniforms that resembled those of sea captains. There were additional employees beyond show staff to keep things running; these included two aquarists, exhibit attendants, ticket takers, guides, custodians, pump crews, lab techs and tank cleaners as well as security.

The aquarist positions were actually supervisory and oversaw the operations of the Marine Studios department. Other departments also made Marineland work. These included the stadium, lab, maintenance, water plant, gift shops, snack bar, theater, grounds crew, restaurant and administration. At one point Marineland was the largest employer in Flagler County with over 300 employees.

Other exhibits complemented the shows including "Wonders of the Sea" allowing a close up of marine specimens in aquariums, electric eel demonstrations, a penguin and flamingo displays. Just east of the circular oceanarium was another tank that originally held fresh water dolphins and manatees, and then was used as a shark nursery for a while before being set up as a fresh water spring in the 1980s. In between shows visitors could walk freely around the oceanariums and sometimes could even play "catch" using a basketball with a friendly dolphin on the top deck.

Another notable and unique feature of Marineland was the fresh water system. Marineland of Florida operated a reverse osmosis water plant that converted salt water to fresh water. The water plant supplied the entire park and subsequent expansions as well as a waste water plant. Treated waste water was sprayed by a huge sprayer called a "rain bird" that was located behind the electric eel exhibit on the western side of the property. Marineland was quite far from any water utility service and had to make its own. Electric power was supplied by Florida Power and Light, however a large backup generator was on hand to keep critical systems running during extended power outages. When a power outage of even short duration occurred, the on duty pumpman was required to quickly restart the pumps or the tanks could start to drain. During a longer outage drains had to be closed to prevent the water from draining out. If an extended power outage occurred, the pumps could run on the backup generator, but many other systems could not.

Under the oceanariums a network of air and utility tunnels existed to allow crews access to valves and power cables. A large high wattage step down transformer was located directly under the circular oceanarium to help supply power to the Marine Studios facility.

For decades, the pioneering aquatic retreat thrived as Florida's only theme park, attracting as many as 400,000 visitors a year. In 1971, Walt Disney World opened, and suddenly the appeal of Marineland shriveled. With the arrival of SeaWorld Orlando in 1973, Marineland attendance deflated to 20,000 visitors a year.

=== Decline ===
Cornelius Vanderbilt Whitney, who was the major stockholder of the private company opted to sell the marine park in 1983 to a group of St. Augustine businessmen during the summer of that year. These new investors brought some new ideas to the park, and some didn't work very well.

Some of these new ideas actually did work and appeared to help the park. For a while the park held its own with fair attendance in the busier summer months with the ongoing traditional shows being complemented by a seasonal high dive show added in 1987 as well as other entertainment such a wandering magician to entertain guests and a sea lion show in Whitney Park. The show presentation order had been changed a few times during the mid 1980s in attempts to better accommodate visitors, with the first part still starting on the Top Deck then the stadium and ending underwater. There were a few experimental tweaks to this in 1985 and 1986 with one instance of the show starting in the underwater portion first.

In 1987 the show schedule was changed completely. The first show now started 30 minutes later at 10:00 am, then further shows at 11:30 am, 1:00 pm, 2:30 pm and the last show at 4:00 pm which cut out the sixth show. The show organization was also changed once again. Shows now started in the Stadium for the educated dolphins, then the jumping dolphins on the top deck of the circular oceanarium with crowds guided by the announcers. Then the show would move into the underwater feeding portions below deck at the circular and rectangular tanks as the hard hat divers would feed dolphins and marine creatures by hand. These new changes seemed to work well and actually helped visitors find the show easier. A sea lion show was also added in Whitney Park adding further entertainment to Marineland.

For a few years a Fourth of July event was held with fireworks at the beach. The event actually would be fairly well attended as locals sought to find a venue away from the crowded events of nearby displays. These events started in the mid 1980s and lasted into the mid 1990s.

Another large expansion occurred, the last one made to the original park, when a campground, affiliated with the Jellystone brand, was built on the southwest side of the property. The campground was equipped with a "ranger station" which served as a gas station and small store.

Attendance began to edge upward from 1985 through 1987, but significant changes were on the way. An administrative decision was made at the end of 1987 to implement large and radical changes in an attempt to modernize the attraction. The new scheme included the merger of the stadium and the studios departments into a department of shows. Historically, this was significant because the studios department had existed since the park's inception and was the last entity in Marineland to carry the "Marine Studios" name. The modernization plan included the retirement of the Miller Dunn Style 3 Divinhood helmets that had been in use since the first day of Marineland's operation. Marineland was the only place in Florida, if not the country, where these were used regularly. They were replaced with the phasing in of modern SCUBA equipment, with the last use of the Miller Dunn helmet occurring in early November 1987. The older nautical themed uniforms were replaced, staff was shuffled around, shows and other items were changed. Following these changes attendance began to decline, and along with poor management decisions and expensive schemes which yielded no return on investment, the ownership group was unable to meet their loan payments and the attraction was again put on the market. Ownership change and accompanying uncertainty was the staus quo from that point.

Into the 1990s, Marineland faced additional challenges from increased government inspections. New regulatory requirements were difficult to meet, increasing the burden on the cash-strapped park. In the later 1990s, because of the deteriorating financial situation many long-time employees were abruptly laid off leaving only a skeleton crew. The maintenance demands of the old park, due to years of neglected investment combined with damage caused by a series of hurricanes from 1999 through 2004, became too costly for the real estate investment group who owned it at the time. The facility began to sink into severe disrepair as the owners sought a buyer. The Skyworker unit used during top deck shows failed and sat useless, while the dolphin stadium also became unusable with large sections of it cordoned off.

Finally, through a convoluted deal involving junk bonds, the property was sold. The buyers planned to build timeshare condominiums on most of the ocean hammock land but were unable to finalize the plan. This effort resulted in bankruptcy for the buyers. In addition, the already-strapped oceanarium had been reconfigured as a non-profit foundation as part of the sale and was responsible for its own sustenance as well as repayment of the bond issue. Needed monies were not invested in repairs, and some features of the park deteriorated so badly they became safety hazards. Leaky portholes were sealed up due to unsafe leaks and even chunks of concrete fell off in a few places. Due to deterioration, all the portholes on the lower level of the circular oceanarium had to be sealed. With no direct ownership, no funding, and the financial burden of bond interest payments, employees were left to cope with equipment failures, safety hazards, no marketing, loss of credit, bounced paychecks, further government inspections and the custodianship of the marine mammals, fish and birds. During this era, many individuals and businesses contributed materials and services to help employees keep the place going. In the end, the foundation repaid the bondholders with pennies on the dollar, a large part of Marineland's dolphin population was sold off to Seaworld in Orlando, and new ownership took over the attraction's operation.

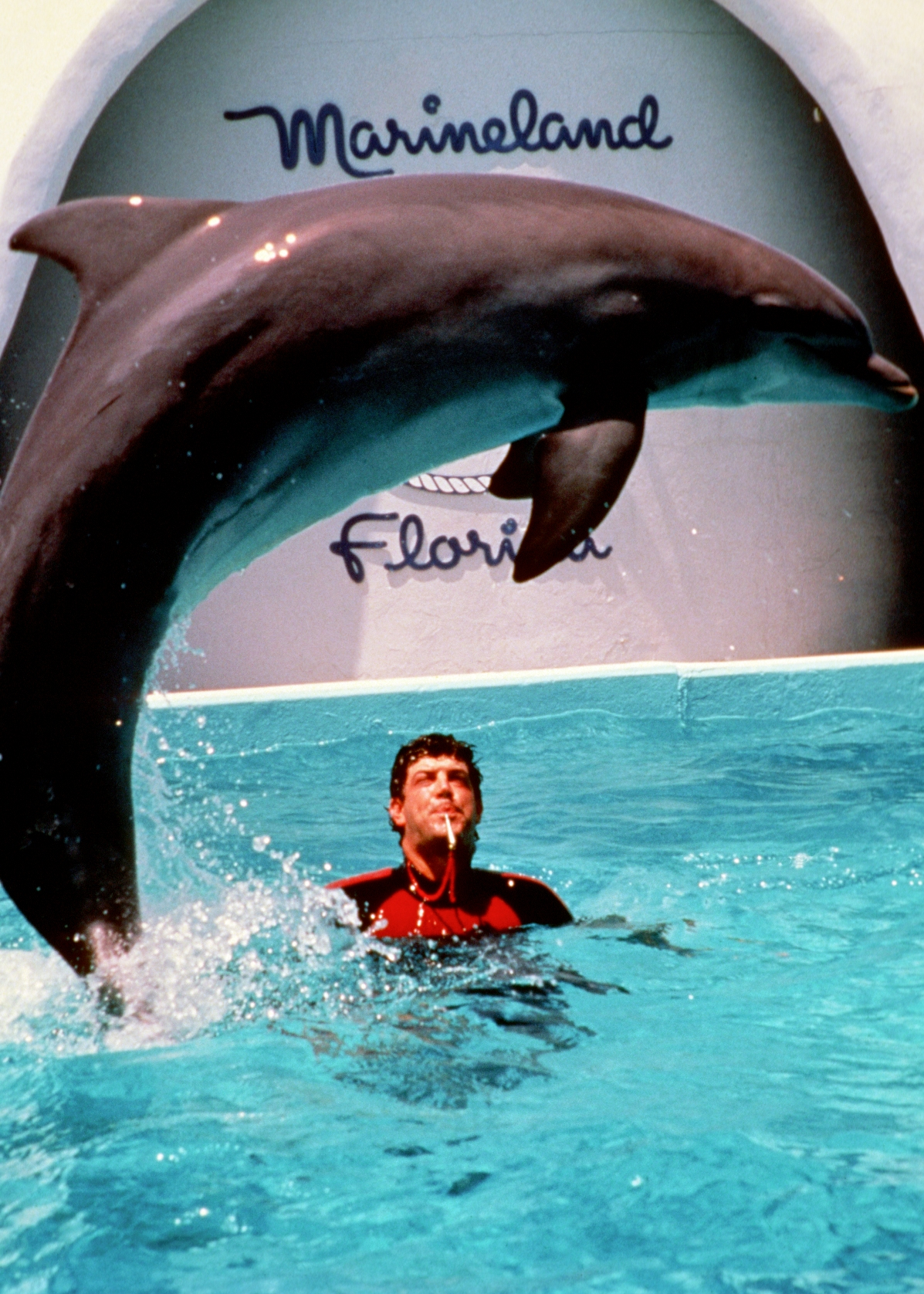
Dolphin Show

=== Rebirth ===
Hurricanes Floyd and Irene in 1999 forced the park to close for two months. Damage was extensive with the famous boardwalk destroyed and the walkways to Whitney park collapsing due to erosion, and the filtration plant under threat of falling into the ocean. Other buildings suffered damage including the iconic Marineland sign. In 2003, all of the park buildings west of Highway A1A were demolished leaving only the original structures along the Atlantic Ocean, as well as the original administration building. In 2004, after being battered by three more hurricanes, the park closed completely for renovations as part of a development scheme by the Atlanta-based developer, Jim Jacoby; it reopened in 2006 as the Dolphin Conservation Center.

During the renovations the original 1938 Circular Oceanarium (400,000 US gallons (1,500,000 L; 330,000 imp gal)) and Rectangular Oceanarium (450,000 US gallons (1,700,000 L; 370,000 imp gal)), along with the 1952 stadium and tanks were demolished as they were well beyond repair. The old Marineland lab was also demolished. Large new tanks which contain nearly 485,000 US gallons (1,840,000 L; 404,000 imp gal) of water were constructed as part of a structure built where Whitney Park once stood. This would become the centerpiece of the new Marineland. This facility includes modern buildings, pumping station, and other equipment, as well as a small museum featuring artifacts of the old Marineland. The location where the original oceanariums once stood became a parking area. The old main entrance, walkway and gift shop were preserved, being the only original structures left on the east side of A1A. Areas along the old main entrance walkway were repurposed with holding tanks for sharks and rehabbed sea turtles standing in the area where the flamingo pond once existed. Fresh water for Marineland now arrives from an expansion of the City of Palm Coast utility system. A new water line was installed along A1A because of development in the area.

The era of the original dolphin shows at Marineland ended as the park was transformed and reopened as a hands-on educational and environmental facility called the Marineland Dolphin Adventure. Guests can now interact directly with the dolphins in the new facility as well see other marine life. Future plans for the area included a condominium development on former park lands, but as of 2022, that has not happened. Western portions of Marineland have been redeveloped with student lodging for the Whitney Lab and other research entities. The former Marineland of Florida administration building was also repurposed, and now serves as offices for the Whitney Laboratories. A new Marina has also been built alongside the Intracoastal Waterway. The rest of the old Marineland property including lands where the hotel and the campground once stood became the property of Flagler County and now make up the River to the Sea Preserve, one of the county's many parks.

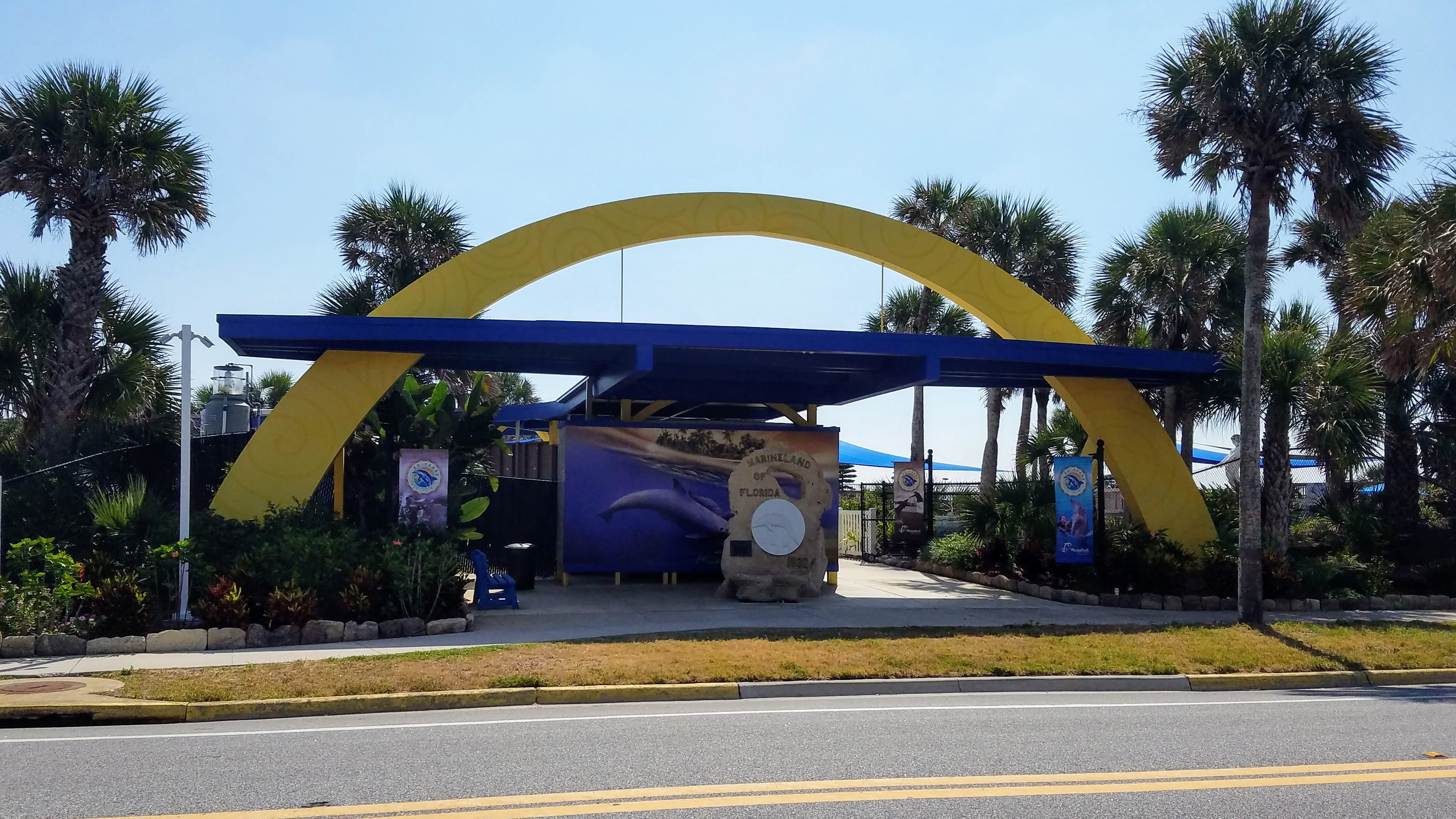
Marineland Entrance 2019

With a gift from Cornelius Vanderbilt Whitney of slightly more than 3 acres (1.2 ha) of land, together with his donation of about half of the total construction costs, on January 30, 1974 the University of Florida had opened the Whitney Marine Laboratory adjacent to Marineland. This laboratory's purpose was the experimental study of marine animals but it was separate from the lab that was once operated by Marineland. Marine Studios through their research facility contributed greatly to the understanding of porpoise and dolphin behavior thanks to Arthur McBride, Forrest Wood, David and Melba Caldwell and other marine biologists and scientists. The staff at Marineland had a "first responder team" for hundreds of stranded whale emergency calls along the southeastern Atlantic Coast during its existence. The old Marineland lab was demolished in the renovations of 2003. Whitney Hall which was used frequently for Marineland parties and events was demolished due to years of storm damages. A new cetacean rescue building was constructed in its place.

Marineland Florida (Marineland Dolphin Adventure) logo Circa 2026

=== Modern Era ===
SFA Students Callie Lynn and Lena Slater conducting signature whistle research at Marineland Florida. Marineland was the place signature whistles were discovered at in the 1960s.

Dr. Bruck (Director of Research and Education) gives dolphin signature whistle lecture at Marineland for the local community as part of a new Marineland Florida lecture series.

On January 1, 2011, Georgia Aquarium purchased Marineland of Florida for a reported $9.1 million. In 2019 the park was sold to The Dolphin Company. On March 31, 2025, The Dolphin Company filed for Chapter 11 bankruptcy protection to deal with its debt and financial challenges. On October 27, 2025 a hearing to approve the facility's sale to a Texas developer was denied by Judge Laurie Selber Silverstein, paving the way for a purchase from #1 Apex Association under Jon and Barbara Rubel of Clay County for 6.5 million. The facility is now managed and operated by Felicia Cook and Jack Kassewitz through the non profit organization Marineland Waves of the Future. Long-time historian Terran McGinnis returned to Marineland in a communications capacity while Kelly Fischbach remained as Zoological Director. On March 20, 2026, the facility announced a renewed focus on discovery, conservation, and marine stewardship, returning the facility to its historic roots, with the appointment of Dr. Jason Bruck as the new Director of Research and Education, succeeding signature whistle co-discoverer Dr. David Caldwell who was the last Director of Research for Marineland Florida during the 1960s and 70s. The facility operates under the name Marineland Dolphin Adventure and has various dolphin interaction programs along with other marine life including cownosed rays, an elaborate collection of fish and marine invertebrates, and even a sea turtle. The facility also offers summer camps for ages 7-17 now supervised by Dr. Bruck and his students.

== Dolphins ==
Marineland Dolphin Adventure houses some of the oldest dolphins in managed care including Betty III (b. 1967), Lightning (b. 1980), Sunny (b. 1984), Shaka (b. 1985), Dazzle (b. 1989), Niele (b. 1994), Casique (b. 2002), Briland (b. 2004), Tocoi (b. 2008), Miramar (b. 2011), Surge (b. 2016), and 'Oli (b. 2016). Marineland also has a rescued dolphin named Comet whose estimated birth was in early 2005 (date of rescue December, 20 2005).
