= Matanzas State Forest =

State forest in Florida, United States

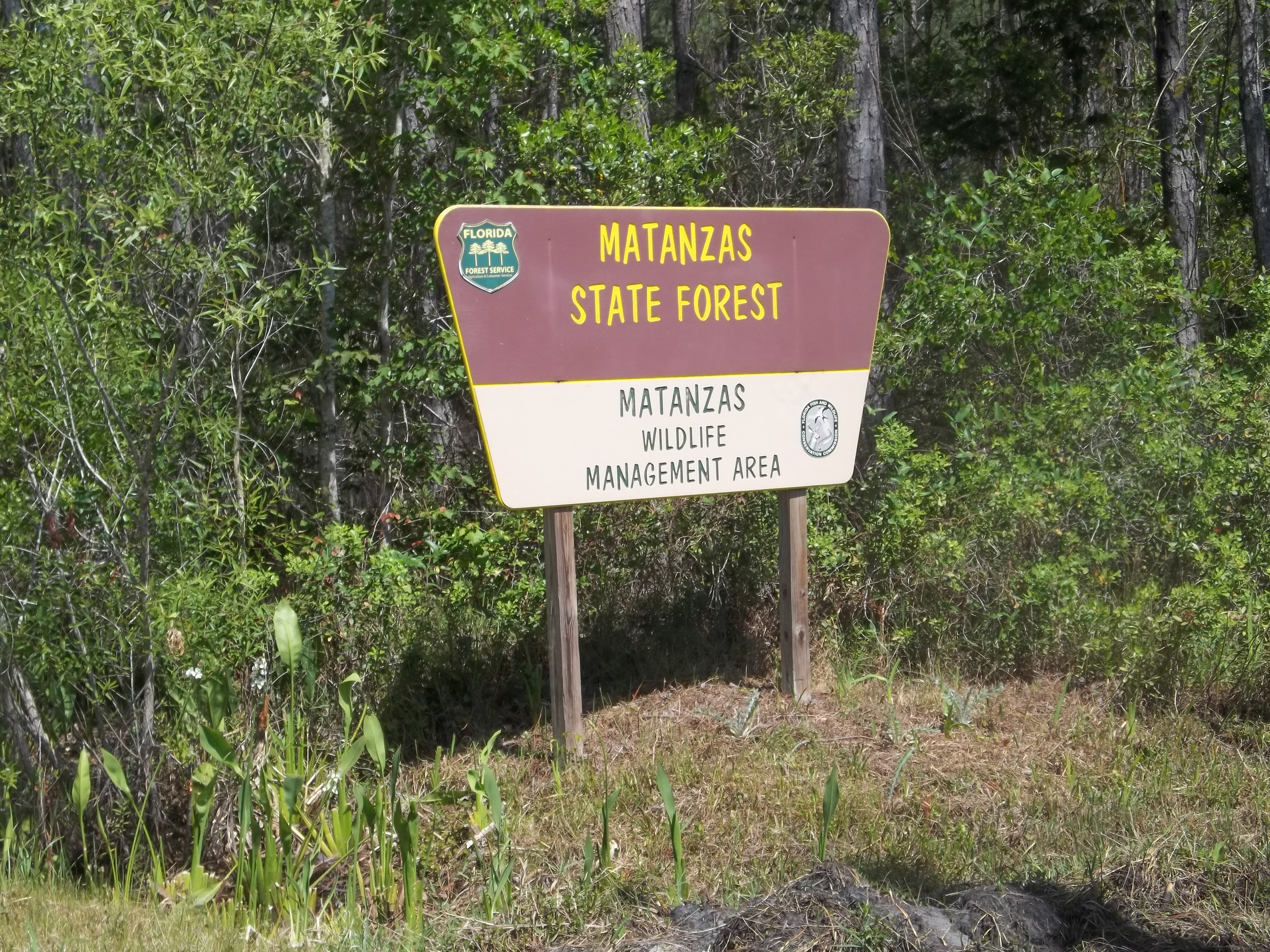
- Sign for the Matanzas State Forest, which also includes the Matanzas Wildlife Management Area

- Map of Florida
- Location: St. Johns County, Florida
- Nearest city: St. Augustine
- Coordinates: 29°42′58.24″N 81°18′9.84″W
- Area: 4,699 acres (1,902 ha)
- Governing body: Florida Department of Environmental Protection

The Matanzas State Forest is in the U.S. state of Florida. The 4,699-acre (19 km^{2}) forest is located in northeastern Florida, near St. Augustine, though it is closer to Crescent Beach. Matanzas State Forest is bordered approximately by U.S. 1 to the west, State Road 206 to the north, the Matanzas River to the east, and the Faver-Dykes State Park to the south.

Besides being owned by the Florida State Division of Forestry, Matanzas State Forest is also co-managed in cooperation with the Florida Fish and Wildlife Conservation Commission and the St. Johns River Water Management District.

The initial land purchase for the forest was completed in 2003, when the state acquired property from timber company Rayonier as part of the Northeast Florida Blueway project.

== See also ==
- List of Florida state forests
- List of Florida state parks

== References and external links ==
Media related to Matanzas State Forest at Wikimedia Commons

- Matanzas State Forest: Florida Division of Forestry- FDACS
