= Francisco Pellicer =

Francisco Pellicer ( c. 1747-1826) was an early resident and carpenter of colonial St. Augustine, Florida. He was named a Great Floridian in 2000, and Pellicer Creek is named in his honor.

Francisco Pellicer was born in the parish of Leon in Menorca around 1747 to Antonio Pellicer and Juana Sintes. At approximately age 21, he came to New Smyrna, Florida as a member of Andrew Turnbull's colony. He married Margarita Femanias and they had two children in the colony and two more in St. Augustine. He bought a lot on Saint George Street with Jose Peso de Burgo and they built a duplex house. Pellicer did well as one of a dozen carpenters in the colony and later bought land on present-day Orange Street.

Pellicer's first wife died around 1783 and he married Juana Villa who bore him nine children. He moved with his family to a farm south of St. Augustine on the Matanzas River and died in 1826.

His Great Floridian plaque is located at the Pellicer-DeBurgo House (reconstructed) at 53 Saint George Street in St. Augustine, which is used as a British style pub in the Colonial Quarter museum complex.
