= Marineland, Florida =

Town in the United States

- Town
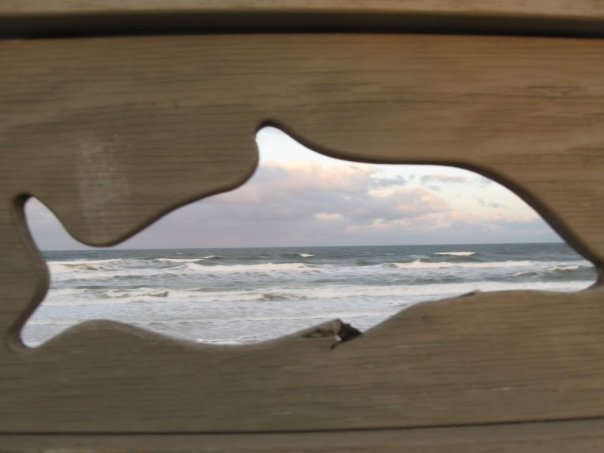
- The beach in Marineland

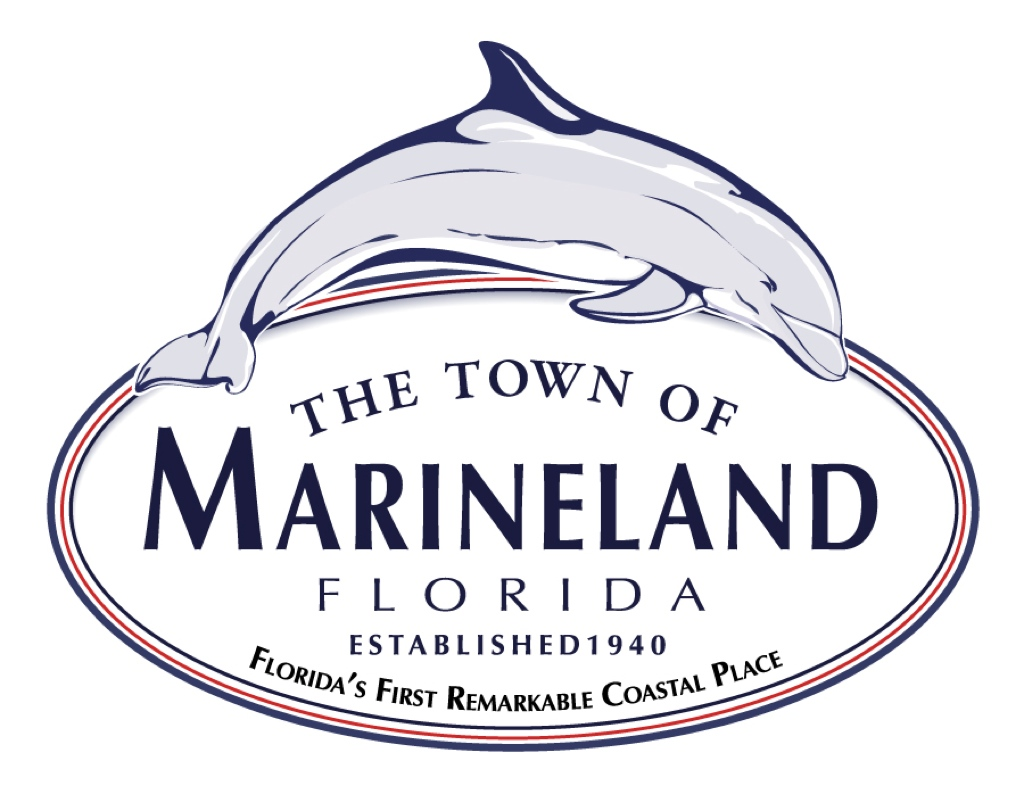
- Logo
- Mottoes: "Florida's First Remarkable Coastal Place" "Naturally The Best!"
- Location in Flagler County and the state of Florida
- Coordinates: 29°39′56″N 81°12′50″W
- Country: United States
- State: Florida
- Counties: Flagler, St. Johns
- Founded: June 23, 1938
- Incorporated: 1940

Government
  - Type: Commission-Manager
  - Mayor: Joseph “Buddy” Pinder
  - Vice Mayor: Douglas "Dewey" Dew, Jr.
  - Commissioner: Jessica Finch
  - Town Manager: Suzanne Dixon
  - Town Clerk: Wilshem Pennick

Area
  - Total: 0.44 sq mi (1.15 km^{2})
  - Land: 0.44 sq mi (1.13 km^{2})
  - Water: 0.0077 sq mi (0.02 km^{2})
- Elevation: 3 ft (0.91 m)

Population (2020)
  - Total: 15
  - Density: 34.4/sq mi (13.27/km^{2})
- Time zone: UTC−05:00 (Eastern (EST))
  - Summer (DST): UTC−04:00 (EDT)
- ZIP code: 32080
- Area codes: 904, 324, 386
- FIPS code: 12-43250
- GNIS feature ID: 2406098
- Website: www.townofmarineland.org

Marineland was established in 1940, and is in both Flagler and St. Johns counties, Florida, United States. Marineland is located 18 miles (29 km) south of St. Augustine along Route A1A. The population was 15 in the 2020 census.

The Marineland marine park and the town have become synonymous; however, many do not realize that Marineland is a town in its own right, with its own local governing body. The town shares a ZIP Code with St. Augustine Beach.

The Flagler County portion of Marineland is part of the Deltona–Daytona Beach–Ormond Beach, FL metropolitan statistical area, while the St. Johns County portion is part of the Jacksonville Metropolitan Statistical Area.

== History ==
Marineland was founded when Marineland Dolphin Adventure opened on June 23, 1938, as "Marine Studios", a facility designed for Hollywood filmmakers to create underwater footage for motion pictures and newsreels. Popularly known as the "World's First Oceanarium," Marine Studios was the premier destination to allow the general public to experience marine life up-close. The town was officially incorporated as a municipality in 1940.

Because of their proximity, the local businesses share close partnerships and vision. The town of Marineland is a hub of research and conservation and is set in the middle of the GTM-NERR (Guana Tolomato Matanzas National Estuarine Research Reserve), local businesses and foundations have close working relationships including Mobius Marine, Inc., Ripple Effect Eco Tours, Marineland Marina, Marineland Dolphin Adventure, Whitney Laboratory for Marine Bioscience (for the University of Florida), the Florida Master Naturalist Program, the southern facility for the GTM NERR, Washington Oaks Gardens State Park, and Faver-Dykes State Park.

== Geography ==
According to the United States Census Bureau, the town has a total area of 0.27 square miles (0.69 km^{2}), all land.

=== Climate ===
The climate in this area is characterized by hot, humid summers and generally mild winters. According to the Köppen climate classification, the Town of Marineland has a humid subtropical climate zone (Cfa).

== Demographics ==
Historical population
Census	Pop.	Note	%±
1950	9		—
1960	9		0.0%
1970	13		44.4%
1980	31		138.5%
1990	21		−32.3%
2000	6		−71.4%
2010	16		166.7%
2020	15		−6.2%
U.S. Decennial Census

=== 2010 and 2020 census ===
Marineland racial composition (Hispanics excluded from racial categories) (NH = Non-Hispanic)
Race	Pop 2010	Pop 2020	% 2010	% 2020
White (NH)	16	2	100.00%	13.33%
Black or African American (NH)	0	4	0.00%	26.67%
Native American or Alaska Native (NH)	0	1	0.00%	6.67%
Asian (NH)	0	1	0.00%	6.67%
Pacific Islander or Native Hawaiian (NH)	0	0	0.00%	0.00%
Some other race (NH)	0	0	0.00%	0.00%
Two or more races/Multiracial (NH)	0	5	0.00%	33.33%
Hispanic or Latino (any race)	0	2	0.00%	13.33%
Total	16	15	100.00%	100.00%

As of the 2020 United States census, there were 15 people, 0 households, and 0 families residing in the town.

As of the 2010 United States census, there were 16 people, 0 households, and 0 families residing in the town.

=== 2000 census ===
As of the census of 2000, there were 6 people, 3 households, and 0 families residing in the town. The population density was 17.7 inhabitants per square mile (6.8/km^{2}). There were 8 housing units at an average density of 23.5 per square mile (9.1/km^{2}). The racial makeup of the town was 100.00% White.

In 2000, there were 3 households, out of which 33.3% had children under the age of 18 living with them, 33.3% were married couples living together, and 66.7% were non-families. 66.7% of all households were made up of individuals, and 33.3% had someone living alone who was 65 years of age or older. The average household size was 2.00 and the average family size was 4.00.

In 2000, in the town, the population was spread out, with 33.3% under the age of 18, 33.3% from 25 to 44, 16.7% from 45 to 64, and 16.7% who were 65 years of age or older. The median age was 26 years. For every 100 females, there were 500.0 males. For every 100 females age 18 and over, there were 300.0 males.

In 2000, the median income for a household in the town was $30,625, and the median income for a family was $21,250. Males had a median income of $31,250 versus $0 for females. The per capita income for the town was $12,000. None of the population and none of the families were below the poverty line.

== Education ==
The St. Johns County portion is within the St. Johns County School District. Zoned schools include W. D. Hartley Elementary School, Gamble Rogers Middle School, and Pedro Menendez High School.

== See also ==
- Marineland of Florida
- List of paved Florida bike trails
