= Cherokee Grove =

- Princess Place Preserve
- U.S. National Register of Historic Places
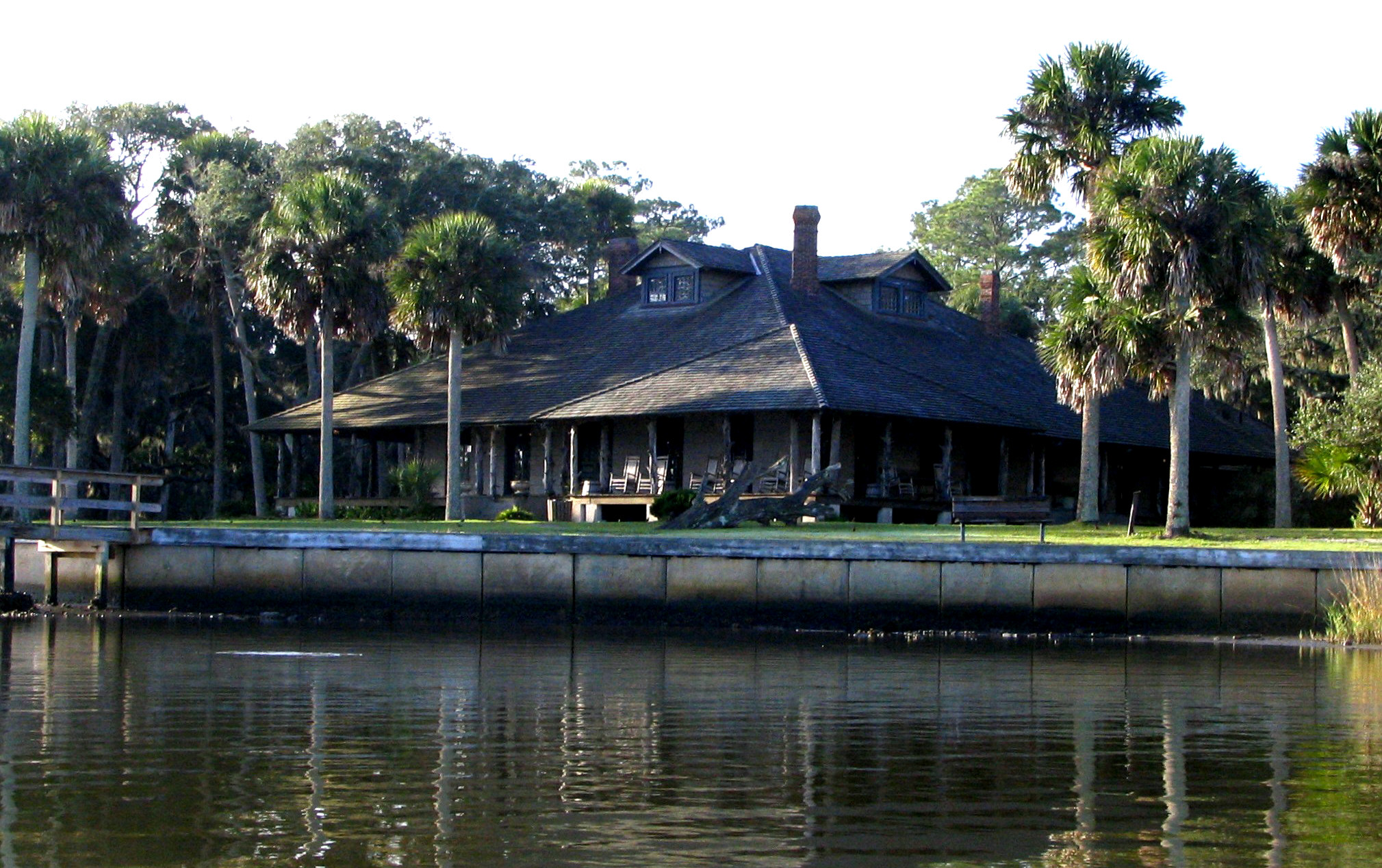

- Location within Florida Location within the United States
- Location: [Palm Coast, Florida], Florida
- Coordinates: 29°39′30″N 81°14′15″W
- NRHP reference No.: 97000379
- Added to NRHP: 2 May 1997

The Princess Place Preserve (also known as Cherokee Grove) is a historic site in Palm Coast, Florida. It is located between SR A1A (Florida) and I-95, on Pellicer Creek, just south of the St. Johns/Flagler county line. On May 2, 1997, it was added to the U.S. National Register of Historic Places.
