= Faver-Dykes State Park =

State park in Florida, United States

- IUCN category IV (habitat/species management area)
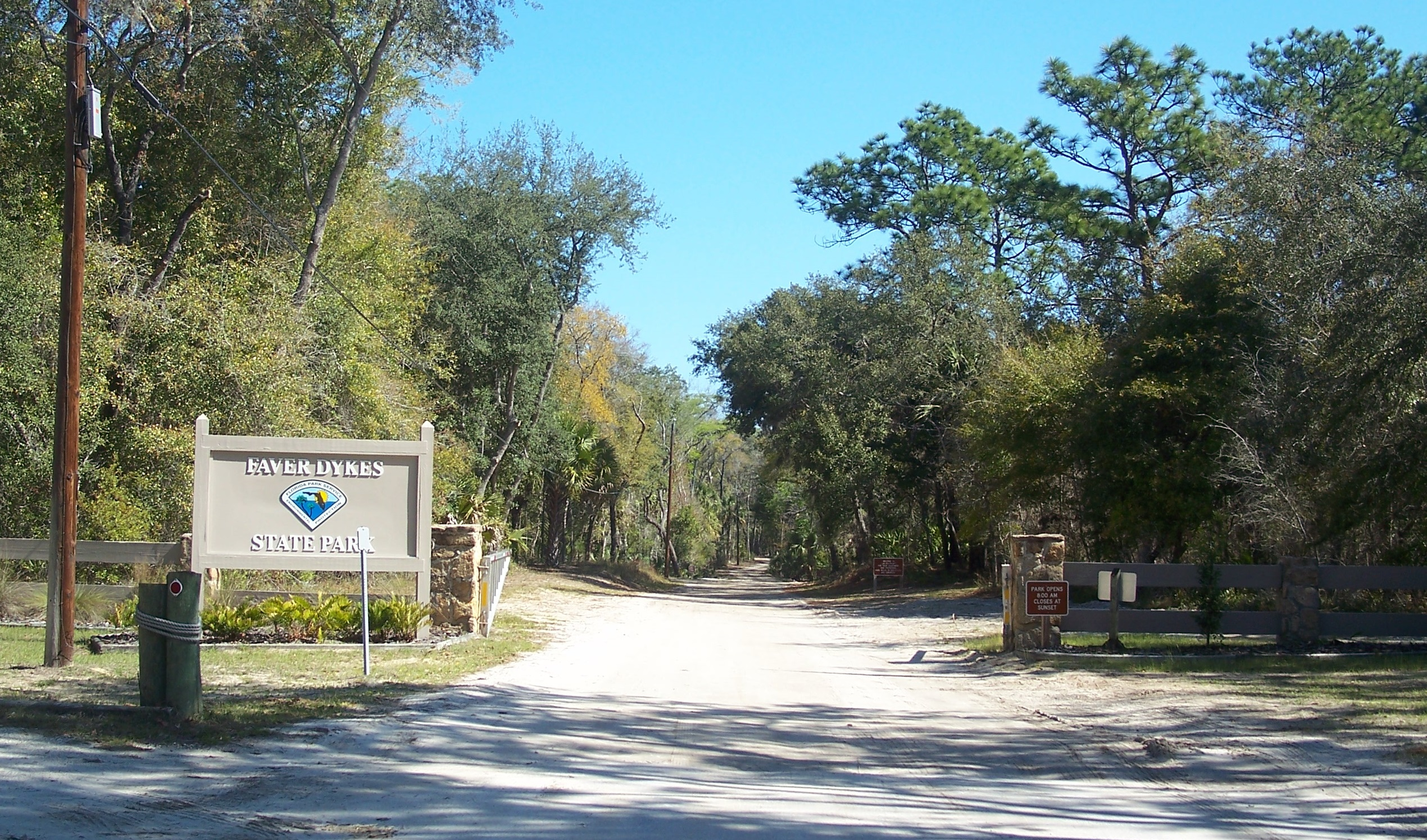
- Front gate at the park

- Location within Florida Location within the United States
- Interactive map of Faver-Dykes State Park
- Location: St. Johns County, Florida, United States
- Nearest city: St. Augustine, Florida
- Coordinates: 29°40′34″N 81°14′53″W
- Established: 1950
- Governing body: Florida Department of Environmental Protection

Faver-Dykes State Park is a Florida State Park located 15 miles (24 km) south of St. Augustine, near the intersection of I-95 and US 1, and bordering Pellicer Creek, a designated state canoe trail. Activities include fishing, picnicking, boating, canoeing, camping and wildlife viewing.

Among the wildlife of the park are white-tailed deer, bobcats, and river otters. There are many birds in the park, including bald eagles, falcons, and hawks, as well as egrets, wood storks, white ibis, wild turkeys, and herons.

Cordgrass, black needlerush, and black mangroves grow along Pellicer Creek, helping stabilize its shoreline and providing wildlife habitat.

== Amenities and hours ==
Amenities include a full-facility campground, primitive youth campground, a boat ramp, two 1/2 mile loop nature trails, and two covered pavilions. Florida state parks are open between 8 a.m. and sundown every day of the year (including holidays).

== Gallery ==
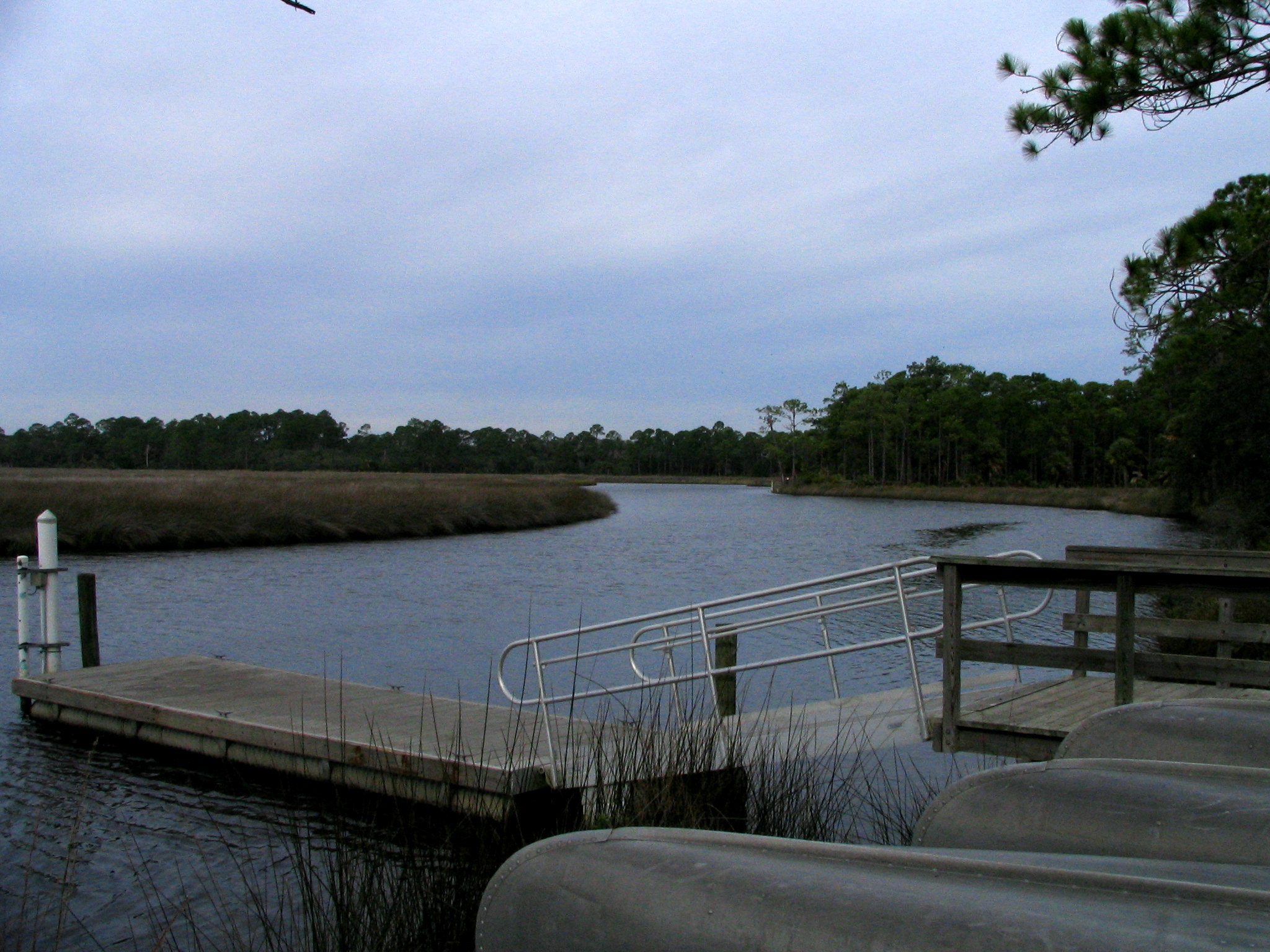
Boat launch at Faver-Dykes

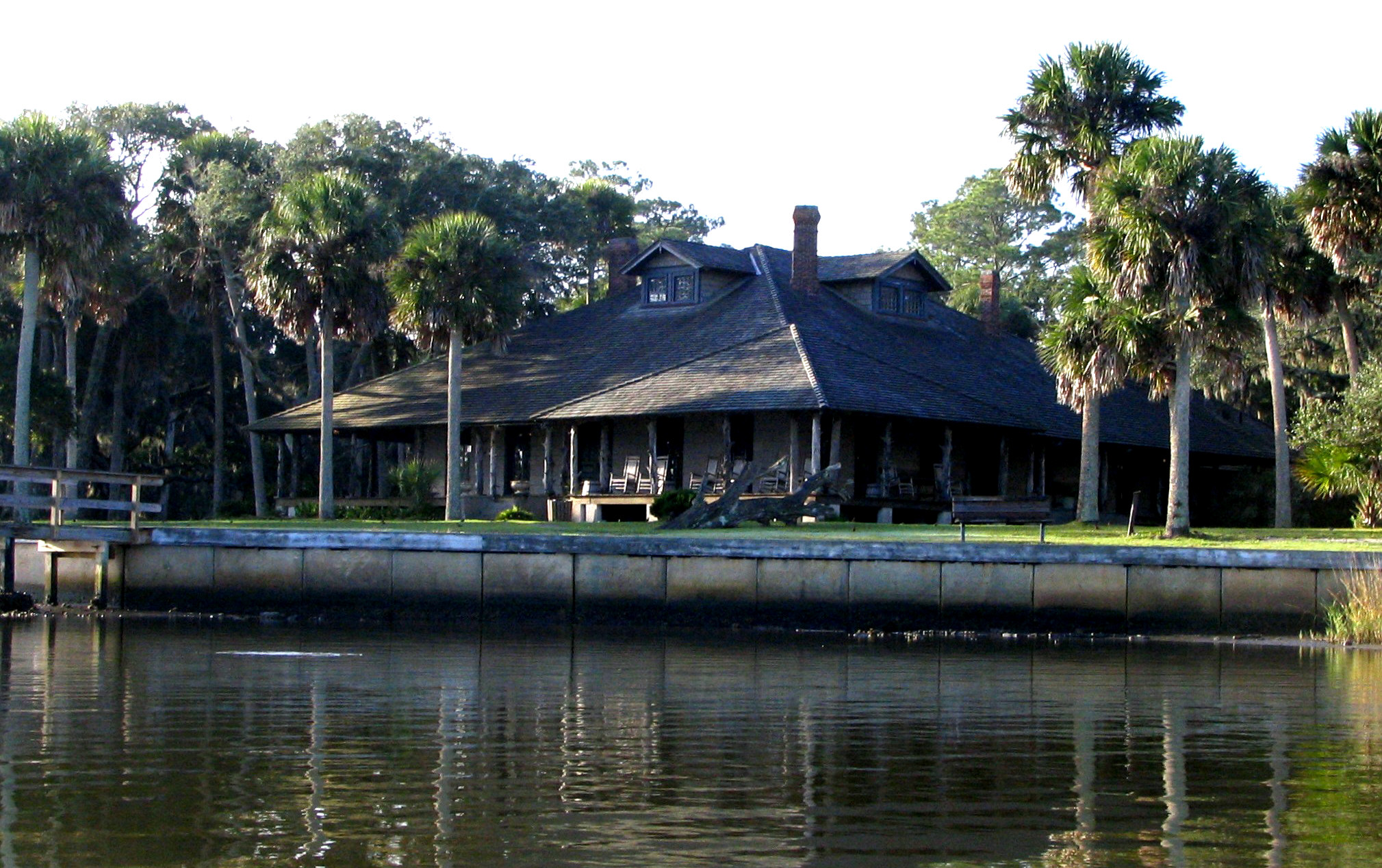
Nearby Princess Place Preserve, and Adirondack-style hunting camp in Florida
