= Moses Creek =

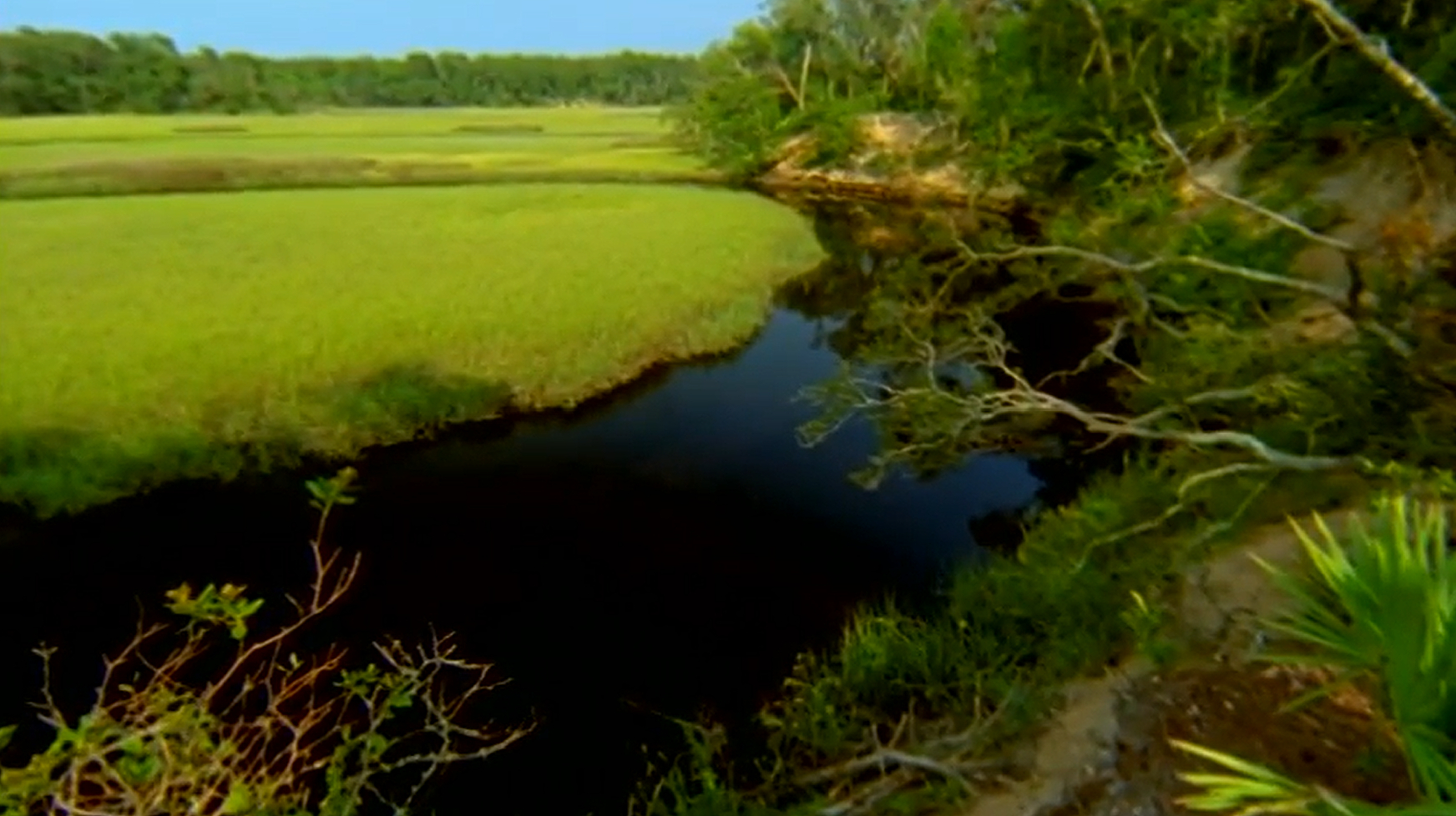
- A bend in the tidal stream at Mural Point on Moses Creek in southern St. Johns County, Florida

- Location of mouth

Location
- Country: United States
- State: Florida
- Counties: St. Johns County, Florida

Physical characteristics
- Source: Wetlands west of Hwy US 1
  - coordinates: 29°52′02.1″N 81°22′41.7″W
- Mouth: Matanzas River
  - location: West bank of Intracoastal Waterway, just north of SR 206
  - coordinates: 29°46′10″N 81°16′22″W
  - elevation: 0 ft (0 m)
- Length: 9 mi (14 km)

Moses Creek is a stream in the U.S. state of Florida. It is a tributary of the Matanzas River, and a major contributor of freshwater to the southern portion of that river. One of the last undisturbed tidal creeks along the east coast of Florida, it is part of the Guana Tolomato Matanzas National Estuarine Research Reserve. Its salt marshes were an important resource for the Native people who lived around it thousands of years ago.

== History ==
The historian Sydney Johnston writes that in 1769, William Gerard de Brahm, Surveyor General of British East Florida, recorded his "surveyor-general's path" extending southwest of St. Augustine, crossing the headwaters of Cicilia Creek (Moses Creek), and curving westward at the latitude of Matanzas Inlet. The King's Road was the road the British built in their colony of East Florida, finished in 1773 and stretching from the St. Marys River, the border between East Florida and Georgia, to south of New Smyrna. It passed through the lands of De Brahm lying north of Woodcutters' Creek (Moultrie Creek), and west of its main channel. It then headed southwest of Cicilia Creek, its south course paralleling the branches of Cicilia Creek to the east. South of Cicilia Creek, the road continued southwest through piney woods, crossing Pellicer Creek west of Hewitt's sawmill.

In his A Concise Natural History of East and West Florida, published in 1776, the cartographer Bernard Romans described the streams one encountered sailing southward from St. Augustine on the west side of the Matanzas River, referring to the mouth of St. Nicholas Creek (Moultrie Creek) where stood the plantation of the Lt. Governor of British East Florida, John Moultrie, and then the mouth of Santa Cecilia (Moses Creek), another "small river of little note" about ten miles south of St. Augustine.

In the early 19th century, George J. F. Clarke and his brother Charles inherited a 300-acre Spanish land grant on the south side of the mouth of Moses Creek, alongside the Matanzas River. There they harvested and sawed timber trees, as well as gathering oyster shells for their lime kilns. They transported the wood and lime in flatboats sent up the Matanzas River to town, supplying the Spanish government with shingles for public buildings, and providing whitewash for the exteriors of houses.

As recounted by the historian Frank Marotti, numerous free men of color, among them Isaac Bacchus and John Morell, tended small farms and cut timber at Moses Creek. Several free Blacks worked for the Clarke brothers, who owned adjacent estates near Bacchus and Morell. George Clarke, a free Black man unrelated to the white Clarke family, farmed and logged in the area. Toby Herreira, also of African descent, lived nearby on twenty-five acres he owned, growing Sea Island cotton, corn, potatoes, and pumpkins, and raising cattle and pigs, as well as poultry.

In 1822, Moses Levy, a Moroccan-born planter and religious reformer, planted sugarcane at "Matanzas", a 1,200 acres (490 ha) plantation he built at the confluence of Moses Creek and the Matanzas River. In 1824 he sold this estate to Achille Murat, a nephew of Napoleon Bonaparte who had settled in Florida, for $1,960. Murat developed the property, located about 10 mi (16 km) south of St. Augustine, using the labor of enslaved Black persons to grow oranges, sugar cane, cotton, and tobacco. He named it "Parthenope", in honor of his onetime principality in Naples, Italy, which had been founded on the site of the ancient Greek colony of Parthenope. Murat liked to go nude and made a submersible chair to escape the heat of the north Florida summers, using it to sit naked in the waters of Moses Creek with mosquito netting over his head.

== Physical geography ==
A feasibility study commissioned by the National Park Service says that like the Matanzas River it discharges into, Moses Creek is straddled by salt marshes with soils that are almost level and inundated with salt or brackish water during the twice daily high tides. They are poorly drained, with mucky or sandy clay loams. Smooth cordgrass is found in the regularly flooded areas, while salt grass and black needlerush are found all over the salt marsh habitat. Bushy seaside oxeye, marsh elder, saltwort, marsh hay, and cordgrass are typically found in the higher areas. According to data gathered by the Moultrie Creek and Moses Creek Watershed Basin Management Project, approximately 41.7 square miles of the watershed is drained by Moultrie Creek and approximately 15.8 square miles is drained by Moses Creek.

The St. Johns River Water Management District (SJRWMD) originally bought 1684 acres (681.5 hectares) of land surrounding Moses Creek in 1995—this land is now incorporated in the Moses Creek Conservation Area. The SJRWMD purchased the land to protect its water resources and the ecology of its environment. Now consisting of 2,172 acres, the Conservation Area is located north of State Road 206 on the west side of the Matanzas River (Intracoastal Waterway). The varied vegetative communities it contains form habitat for an array of wildlife species. The eight natural communities that occur here include: estuarine tidal marsh, dome swamp, depression marsh, mesic flatwood, freshwater tidal swamp, upland mixed forest, sandhill, and scrub.

The Moses Creek Conservation Area is included within the boundaries of the Guana Tolomato Matanzas National Estuarine Research Reserve (GTMNERR) area, and was created to buffer the adjacent salt marsh community from future development along the shoreline. The "diversity of natural communities supports numerous terrestrial, aquatic, and water-dependent wildlife with its feeding, nesting, and resting habitats for wading birds and gopher tortoises". The southern part of the GTMNERR is associated with the Matanzas River estuary, and extends from Moultrie Creek to south of Pellicer Creek. The habitats found within the southern part of the reserve, as in the Moses Creek Conservation Area, are the same habitats found along the Matanzas and Tolomato Rivers. Moses Creek and the Matanzas River support extensive undeveloped areas of this tidal marsh area. Moses Creek drains a large area of swamps and wet flatwoods in western St. Johns County. As the creek becomes a stream, it flows eastward and enters the Moses Creek Conservation Area in the northwestern part of the property. The creek continues southeast, eventually flowing into the Matanzas River.

A report prepared by the School of Geosciences at the University of Florida describes the valley of Moses Creek as one with a complex geomorphic history, with most of the valley floor composed of an upper terrace with upland sands, occupied by a mixed upland pine and oak forest with dense saw palmetto stands, probably a result of earlier fluvial action that no longer occurs. According to field data gathered by the team, hardwoods including sweetgum, ironwood, laurel oak and American elm, as well as cabbage palm are dominant as the terrace transitions into the low-lying and alluvially active backswamp alongside the stream’s meander belt. The backswamp is dominated by bald cypress, buttonbush, American elm, ironwood and red maple. These species plus cabbage palm, saw palmetto, swamp dogwood, green ash, blackgum laurel oak, and water hickory occur on the channel banks, alluvial ridge, and low-lying areas within the meander belt. The distinct outer hillslopes are pine flatwoods, while the stream meanders through the upper terrace forming a lower, alluvially active floodplain surface.

== Flora and fauna ==
List of rare species potentially occurring in the Florida Blueway Phase II: Tolomato and Matanzas Rivers

(includes Moses Creek Watershed Basin)

adapted from Florida Natural Areas Inventory (FNAI) datasets

| Scientific name | Common name |
|---|---|
| Fish | |
| Acipenser brevirostrum | shortnose sturgeon |
| Acipenser oxyrinchus oxyrinchus | Atlantic sturgeon |
| Agonostomus monticola | mountain mullet |
| Awaous tajasica | river goby |
| Notropis cummingsae | dusky shiner |
| Petromyzon marinus | sea lamprey |
| Amphibians | |
| Notophthalmus perstriatus | striped newt |
| Rana capito | gopher frog |
| Reptiles | |
| Alligator mississippiensis | American alligator |
| Clemmys guttata | spotted turtle |
| Crotalus adamanteus | eastern diamondback rattlesnake |
| Drymarchon corais | eastern indigo snake |
| Gopherus polyphemus | gopher tortoise |
| Pituophis melanoleucus mugitus | Florida pine snake |
| Birds | |
| Accipiter cooperii | Cooper's hawk |
| Aimophila aestivalis | Bachman's sparrow |
| Ajaia ajaja | roseate spoonbill |
| Aramus guarauna | limpkin |
| Ardea alba | great egret |
| Charadrius melodus | piping plover |
| Egretta caerulea | little blue heron |
| Egretta thula | snowy egret |
| Egretta tricolor | tricolored heron |
| Elanoides forficatus | swallow-tailed kite |
| Eudocimus albus | white ibis |
| Falco columbarius | merlin |
| Falco peregrinus | peregrine falcon |
| Falco sparverius | southeastern American kestrel |
| Haematopus palliatus | American oystercatcher |
| Haliaeetus leucocephalus | bald eagle |
| Ixobrychus exilis | least bittern |
| Laterallus jamaicensis | black rail |
| Mycteria americana | wood stork |
| Nyctanassa violacea | yellow-crowned night-heron |
| Nycticorax nycticorax | black-crowned night-heron |
| Pandion haliaetus | osprey |
| Pelecanus occidentalis | brown pelican |
| Picoides borealis | red-cockaded woodpecker |
| Picoides villosus | hairy woodpecker |
| Plegadis falcinellus | glossy ibis |
| Rynchops niger | black skimmer |
| Sterna antillarum | least tern |
| Sterna caspia | Caspian tern |
| Sterna maxima | royal tern |
| Sterna sandvicensis | sandwich tern |

| Scientific name | Common name |
|---|---|
| Mammals | |
| Corynorhinus rafinesquii | Rafinesque's big-eared bat |
| Mustela frenata | southeastern weasel |
| Mustela vison | Atlantic salt marsh mink |
| Neofiber alleni | round-tailed muskrat |
| Podomys floridanus | Florida mouse |
| Sciurus niger | Sherman's fox squirrel |
| Sorex longirostris | southeastern shrew |
| Trichechus manatus | manatee |
| Ursus americanus floridanus | Florida black bear |
| Vascular plants | |
| Asclepias viridula | southern milkweed |
| Baptisia calycosa | Canby's wild indigo |
| Calamovilfa curtissii | Curtiss' sandgrass |
| Salpingostylis caelestina | Bartram's ixia |
| Euphorbia cumulicola | sand-dune spurge |
| Cheiroglossa palmata | hand fern |
| Ctenium floridanum | Florida toothache grass |
| Glandularia maritima | coastal vervain |
| Nemastylis floridana | fall-flowering ixia |
| Nolina atopocarpa | Florida beargrass |
| Pteroglossaspis ecristata | wild coco |
| Pycnanthemum floridanum | Florida mountain-mint |
| Rhynchospora punctata | pineland beakrush |
| Rudbeckia nitida | St. John's Susan |
| Ruellia noctiflora | white-flowered wild petunia |
| Verbesina heterophylla | variable-leaf crownbeard |

=== Birds ===
Cornell Lab of Ornithology's list of birds sighted in the Moses Creek Conservation Area:

1. Hooded Merganser (Lophodytes cucullatus)
2. Northern Bobwhite (Colinus virginianus)
3. Wild Turkey (Meleagris gallopavo)
4. Eurasian Collared-Dove (Streptopelia decaocto)
5. Common Ground Dove (Columbina passerina)
6. Mourning Dove (Zenaida macroura)
7. Common Nighthawk (Chordeiles minor)
8. Chuck-will's-widow (Antrostomus carolinensis)
9. Ruby-throated Hummingbird (Archilochus colubris)
10. Clapper Rail (Rallus crepitans)
11. Sandhill Crane (Antigone canadensis)
12. Black-bellied Plover (Pluvialis squatarola)
13. Killdeer (Charadrius vociferus)
14. Spotted Sandpiper (Actitis macularius)
15. Sanderling (Calidris alba)
16. Laughing Gull (Leucophaeus atricilla)
17. Least Tern (Sternula antillarum)
18. Forster's Tern (Sterna forsteri)
19. Pied-billed Grebe (Podilymbus podiceps)
20. Wood Stork (Mycteria americana)
21. Double-crested Cormorant (Nannopterum auritum)
22. White Ibis (Eudocimus albus)
23. Roseate Spoonbill (Platalea ajaja)
24. Little Blue Heron (Egretta caerulea)
25. Tricolored Heron (Egretta tricolor)
26. Snowy Egret (Egretta thula)
27. Great Egret (Ardea alba)
28. Great Blue Heron (Ardea herodias)
29. American White Pelican (Pelecanus erythrorhynchos)
30. Brown Pelican (Pelecanus occidentalis)
31. Black Vulture (Coragyps atratus)
32. Turkey Vulture (Cathartes aura)
33. Osprey (Pandion haliaetus)
34. Swallow-tailed Kite (Elanoides forficatus)
35. Sharp-shinned Hawk (Accipiter striatus)
36. Cooper's Hawk (Astur cooperii)
37. Bald Eagle (Haliaeetus leucocephalus)
38. Red-shouldered Hawk (Buteo lineatus)
39. Red-tailed Hawk (Buteo jamaicensis)
40. Great Horned Owl (Bubo virginianus)
41. Barred Owl (Strix varia)
42. Belted Kingfisher (Megaceryle alcyon)
43. Yellow-bellied Sapsucker (Sphyrapicus varius)
44. Red-bellied Woodpecker (Melanerpes carolinus)
45. Downy Woodpecker (Dryobates pubescens)
46. Pileated Woodpecker (Dryocopus pileatus)
47. American Kestrel (Falco sparverius)
48. Nanday Parakeet (Aratinga nenday)
49. Eastern Phoebe (Sayornis phoebe)
50. Great Crested Flycatcher (Myiarchus crinitus)
51. White-eyed Vireo (Vireo griseus)
52. Yellow-throated Vireo (Vireo flavifrons)
53. Blue-headed Vireo (Vireo solitarius)
54. Red-eyed Vireo (Vireo olivaceus)
55. Loggerhead Shrike (Lanius ludovicianus)
56. Blue Jay (Cyanocitta cristata)
57. American Crow (Corvus brachyrhynchos)
58. Fish Crow (Corvus ossifragus)
59. Carolina Chickadee (Poecile carolinensis)
60. Tufted Titmouse (Baeolophus bicolor)
61. Tree Swallow (Tachycineta bicolor)
62. Barn Swallow (Hirundo rustica)
63. Ruby-crowned Kinglet (Corthylio calendula)
64. Brown-headed Nuthatch (Sitta pusilla)
65. Blue-gray Gnatcatcher (Polioptila caerulea)
66. Northern House Wren (Troglodytes aedon)
67. Marsh Wren (Cistothorus palustris)
68. Carolina Wren (Thryothorus ludovicianus)
69. Gray Catbird (Dumetella carolinensis)
70. Northern Mockingbird (Mimus polyglottos)
71. Eastern Bluebird (Sialia sialis)
72. Hermit Thrush (Catharus guttatus)
73. American Robin (Turdus migratorius)
74. Cedar Waxwing (Bombycilla cedrorum)
75. American Goldfinch (Spinus tristis)
76. Chipping Sparrow (Spizella passerina)
77. Song Sparrow (Melospiza melodia)
78. Swamp Sparrow (Melospiza georgiana)
79. Eastern Towhee (Pipilo erythrophthalmus)
80. Bobolink (Dolichonyx oryzivorus)
81. Baltimore Oriole (Icterus galbula)
82. Red-winged Blackbird (Agelaius phoeniceus)
83. Brown-headed Cowbird (Molothrus ater)
84. Boat-tailed Grackle (Quiscalus major)
85. Ovenbird (Seiurus aurocapilla)
86. Worm-eating Warbler (Helmitheros vermivorum)
87. Black-and-white Warbler (Mniotilta varia)
88. Orange-crowned Warbler (Leiothlypis celata)
89. Common Yellowthroat (Geothlypis trichas)
90. American Redstart (Setophaga ruticilla)
91. Cape May Warbler (Setophaga tigrina)
92. Northern Parula (Setophaga americana)
93. Blackpoll Warbler (Setophaga striata)
94. Black-throated Blue Warbler (Setophaga caerulescens)
95. Palm Warbler (Setophaga palmarum)
96. Pine Warbler (Setophaga pinus)
97. Yellow-rumped Warbler (Setophaga coronata)
98. Yellow-throated Warbler (Setophaga dominica)
99. Prairie Warbler (Setophaga discolor)
100. Summer Tanager (Piranga rubra)
101. Scarlet Tanager (Piranga olivacea)
102. Northern Cardinal (Cardinalis cardinalis)
103. Indigo Bunting (Passerina cyanea)
104. Painted Bunting (Passerina ciris)
105. woodpecker sp. (Picidae sp.)
