= Moultrie Creek =

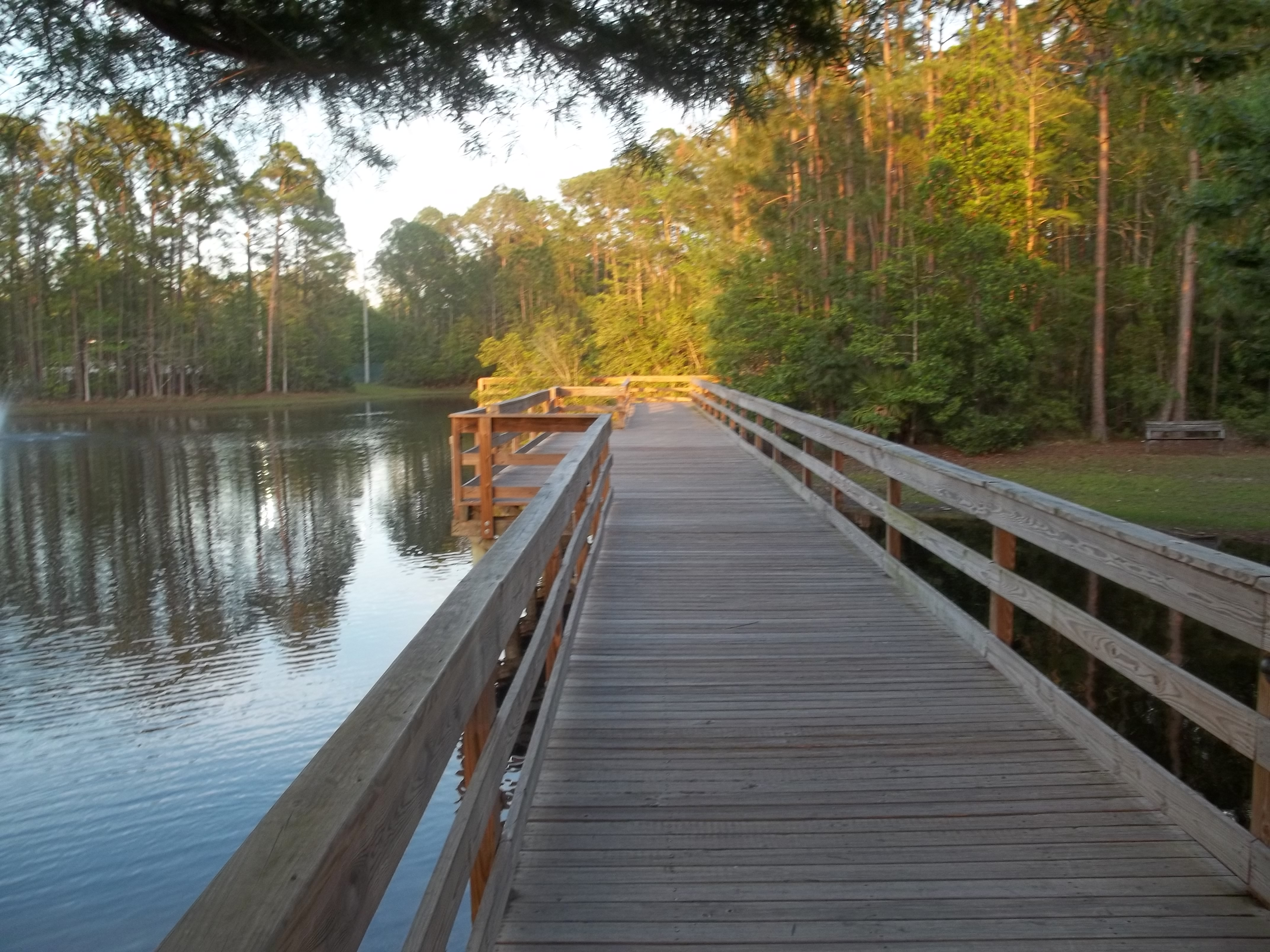
- Moultrie Creek Treaty Park in St. Johns County, Florida

- Location of mouth

Location
- Country: United States
- State: Florida
- Counties: St. Johns County, Florida

Physical characteristics
- Source: Cowan Swamp wetlands
  - coordinates: 29°52′02.1″N 81°22′41.7″W
- Mouth: Matanzas River
  - location: Lewis Point, St. Augustine South
  - coordinates: 29°49′51″N 81°18′19″W
  - elevation: 0 ft (0 m)
- Length: 9 mi (14 km)

Moultrie Creek is a tidal stream in St. Johns County in the U.S. state of Florida. It is nine miles (14 km) long and flows generally eastward through hardwood hammock, estuarine habitats and salt marsh into the Matanzas River, a saltwater estuary that is part of the Intracoastal Waterway (ICW). Its mouth is located five miles southwest of St. Augustine on the western side of the ICW.

== History ==
According to Hagan and Jones, during the first Spanish period (1559–1763) of Florida's history, the Spanish called Moultrie Creek and the locale where it joins the Matanzas River San Nicolas. After Florida was ceded to Great Britain by the terms of the Treaty of Paris of 1763, the British called the area Woodcutters'. When Florida was returned to Spain by the terms of the Treaty of Paris of 1783, the Spanish again referred to the creek and the surrounding area as San Nicolas from 1784 until 1821, when Spain turned over possession of Florida to the United States.

John Bartram and his son William visited St. Augustine on their journey through the Carolinas, Georgia, and Florida. On 11 December 1765 they rowed south on the Matanzas River to Moultrie Creek, or Woodcutters' Creek as it was known then. Bartram records in his diary that on the north bank there were several old houses or huts built by the Spaniards to live in while they cut oak wood under the guard of a company of soldiers to protect them from the Creek Indians who frequented the area.

He describes the land up the creek as being generally 5 or 20 feet from the high tide line, with nearly perpendicular bluffs that rise close to the creek in some places, as well as grassy savanas running half a mile on each side of the creek in others. He notes the presence on the bank borders of ground oaks, bay trees and myrtles (waxmyrtle). He also mentions several little tributary creeks bordered with salt marsh at first, but higher up bordered with fresh water swamps where grew red maple, ash, red bay, magnolia, cypress, sweet gum, black tupelo, and fetterbush, dogwood, sweetbay magnolia, itea, china root, elm, and on the banks large evergreen oaks, longleaf pines, swamp pines, three-leaved pines and spruce pines.

John Moultrie, a wealthy physician from Edinburgh, established his country seat, Bella Vista plantation, about four miles south of St. Augustine on the Matanzas River, near where it joins Moultrie Creek (called Woodcutters' Creek by the British). Governor Patrick Tonyn granted Moultrie a fifteen-hundred-acre tract located on the creek with extensive stands of cypress and longleaf pine from which lumber was cut. The pine trees also produced naval stores such as turpentine and tar, with 25,000 trees tapped for turpentine. In 1767 he dismantled his plantations in South Carolina and moved his family and slaves to East Florida, of which St. Augustine was the capital. There he gained office as president of the council and was appointed lieutenant governor under Governor James Grant. During the interim of July 1771 through March 1774, between the governorship of Grant and that of Colonel Patrick Tonyn (1725–1804), Moultrie served as acting governor.

During the British Period, the King's Road was built from New Smyrna to Colerain, Georgia. As described by Paul Weaver, a 1775 survey of the Moultrie Grant locates it graphically in relation to the course of the King's Road in St. Johns County. The survey shows the road bearing southwest from the bluffs near present-day Old Moultrie Road across the north branch of Moultrie Creek to the spot where Fort Peyton was raised during the Second Seminole War. The King's Road passed through the lands of William Gerard de Brahm lying north of Woodcutters' Creek (Moultrie Creek), and west of its main channel. It then headed southwest of Cicilia Creek (Moses Creek), its south course paralleling the branches of Cicilia Creek to the east. South of Cicilia Creek the road continued southwest through piney woods, crossing Pellicer Creek west of Hewitt's sawmill.

As a result of the cession of Florida by Spain in 1821, the Treaty of Moultrie Creek was signed between the Seminole Indians and the United States government in 1823. The spot chosen for the council was the second landing place on the north bank of Moultrie Creek. The young warrior Osceola was among the 425 Seminole, mostly men, who were present. The terms of the treaty included the resettlement of the Seminole people on a reservation in the unpopulated wilds of central Florida, and the relinquishing of all their other lands to the US. It also required the Seminoles to apprehend all slaves and other fugitives found in this new reservation. The Indians were promised farming implements and funds to help develop this new land. Governor William Duval was present for the signing, as well as James Gadsden, who had been appointed to negotiate with the Seminoles. More than 400 Seminole Indians from around the territory attended the negotiations. The treaty was signed by thirty-two Seminole and three US government representatives. The United States failed to honor its terms and in 1835 the Second Seminole War broke out as a result of this betrayal.

Fort Peyton was a stockaded fort built in August 1837 by the United States Army, one of a chain of military outposts created during the Second Seminole War for the protection of the St. Augustine area in the Florida Territory. The fort stood about five miles southwest of St. Augustine, on the south side of Moultrie Creek, where the Treaty of Moultrie Creek had been signed in 1823 between the US and the chiefs of several bands of Seminoles living in the territory.

On 21 October 1837, the Seminole leaders Osceola and chief Coacoochee were captured just south of Moultrie Creek, about a mile south of Fort Peyton, by Brigadier General Joseph M. Hernández of the Florida militia, who later became the first Hispanic member of the United States Congress. Under the orders of U.S. Army General Thomas Sidney Jesup, Hernández took the Seminole leaders captive when they approached the agreed-upon spot for negotiations under a white flag of truce. Although this incident marked the end of one phase of the war, the hostilities continued for another five years.

Henry Stanton O'Brien of Albany, New York, built a house alongside the mouth of Moultrie Creek as a winter home in 1885. It has distinctive Eastlake architecture in the Queen Anne style. The structure sits on 12 acres of land on a partly cleared peninsula with scattered live oak trees. According to the St. Johns County List of Designated Landmarks, the site is probably the location of the Franciscan Mission Purisima Concepcion de Casapullas (c. 1737), also called San Nicolas de Casapullas. It was later the improved section of a Second Spanish Period (1784–1821) land grant to Matias Pons, who was of Menorcan parentage. The property was deforested for crop cultivation as long ago as 1809.

The house is architecturally significant for its Queen Anne–Eastlake Style architecture and the poured concrete foundation with a coquina aggregate, which was unusual at the time it was constructed. The O'Brien family planted orange groves on the grounds. From 1931–1945, the house was "The Dixie Home for the Aged & Infirm Deaf", founded by deaf donors. In the early 1940s it was purchased by the Kelleys of Lawrenceville, Georgia, who owned it for more than forty years. The house was rehabilitated in the late 1990s by new owners. The building was added to the National Register of Historic Places in October 2024.

Around the beginning of the 20th century, an educator from Alabama, the Rev. G.M. Elliott, opened the Negro Industrial Institute in Moultrie on a property beside Moultrie Creek that included a Victorian-period house. The school had 45 boarding students enrolled by its first year of operation, and published a quarterly newspaper called "Coquina". In 1910, a fire destroyed the boy's dormitory, a frame structure. Elliott then relocated the school to New Augustine, opposite Lincolnville.

Scenes in the movie The Celestine Prophecy were filmed in 2005 at the home of Fred and Lilly Vaill at Vaill Point, which faces the Intracoastal Waterway on the east and is bordered on the north by Moultrie Creek. The film crew's location manager scouted the area and showed the site to the movie's producers, who chose it to represent the Vicente Lodge, a focal point of the film. The grounds have courtyards, green lawns and colorful landscaping surrounded by a hammock of large live oaks and sabal palms. The Spanish-style house, called La Villa Bien Venidos, or "The House of Welcome", covers 5,200 square feet. Built in 1926 by Fred Vaill's father, the house had been designed in anticipation that King Alfonso XIII of Spain would visit St. Augustine and stay there as a guest. Fred Sr. was part of a delegation from the city who in 1924 attended the reinterment of the remains of Pedro Menéndez de Avilés, the founder of St. Augustine, at the Church of San Antonio de Padua in the adelantado's home town of Avilés in Asturias, Spain. The delegates were feted with a luncheon by the king and were presented with Menéndez's outer coffin and his headboard as a gift to the City of St. Augustine, where they are now on exhibit at the Mission Nombre de Dios.

== Physical Geography ==
Vaill Point Park, located on a bluff with an elevation of 20–25 feet on its east side, contains 23 acres bordered on the north by Moultrie Creek and on the east by the Intracoastal Waterway. The primary vegetative communities on this site vary according to the topography of the land. They include salt marsh, oak/pine forest, temperate hardwoods, and live oak/upland temperate hammock. The live oak community of oak, hickory, and magnolia trees extends to the edges of the bluff. The saltwater marsh community of plants contains habitat for several wading birds including the least bittern, least tern, reddish egret, snowy egret, tri-colored heron, yellow-crowned night heron, white ibis, brown pelican, and the bald eagle.

The Great Florida Birding and Wildlife Trail website says that the clapper rail occurs at Vaill Point Park in the salt marsh along the ICW. It lists the white-eyed vireo, the pileated woodpecker, and the black-and-white warbler (winter), as woodland birds. Merlin and northern bobwhite have been recorded on site as well. Birds found here in the spring and fall migrations include the veery and scarlet tanager and as many as 20 species of wood-warblers have been recorded at the park, including the Blackburnian warbler, the black-throated blue warbler, and the Cape May warbler.

The live oak/upland temperate hammock, made up of large pines standing alongside the western bluff of Moultrie Creek, provides nesting and roosting sites for several state and federally listed bird species. These species include the peregrine falcon, the osprey, and the bald eagle. The oak/pine forest community historically has been the site of gopher tortoise burrows.

The Trust for Public Land describes the property as an "environmentally sensitive and archeologically significant site" surrounded by residential development, but having panoramic views of both bodies of water. According to the trust's website, about two thirds of the park is situated within an archaeological zone listed by the Florida Division of Historical Resources. It contains shell middens, aboriginal ceramics, historic drainage facilities, historic foundations including a coquina foundation, glass, and European ceramics. The trust quotes Roger Van Ghent, a member of the county Land Acquisition Management Plan board: "Nowhere else in this county, and in very few places in Florida, do we find a high elevation of oak hammock combined with scenic views of salt marsh, an estuarine tributary, and a tidal river."

== Hydrography ==
A feasibility study commissioned by the National Park Service says that like the Matanzas River it discharges into, the lower Moultrie Creek is straddled by salt marshes with soils that are almost level and inundated with salt or brackish water during the twice daily high tides. They are poorly drained, with mucky or sandy clay loams. Smooth cordgrass is found in the regularly flooded areas, while salt grass and black needlerush are found all over the salt marsh habitat. Bushy seaside oxeye, marsh elder, saltwort, marsh hay, and cordgrass are typically found in the higher areas. Moultrie Creek is tidally influenced for a distance of about 5 miles upstream of its mouth and 3.4 miles upstream of the U.S. Highway 1 bridge. According to data gathered by the Moultrie Creek and Moses Creek Watershed Basin Management Project, approximately 41.7 square miles of the watershed is drained by Moultrie Creek and approximately 15.8 square miles is drained by Moses Creek.

== Geology ==
According to a study commissioned by the Florida Department of Environmental Regulation in 1990, the upper 50 to 60 feet of materials beneath the Moultrie Creek watershed, as in the rest of St. Johns County, is composed of sands, seashells or coquina, and small amounts of clay. These materials apparently were deposited during the warm interglacial periods when sea levels were significantly higher than in modern times. With successive depositions, several periods of erosion and redeposition apparently occurred. This process gradually shaped the surface materials to produce the present landform features. From the Talbot and Silver Bluff interglacial periods to the present, stormwater runoff gradually eroded Moultrie Creek and its tributary streams into the low plateau that now composes the Moultrie Creek watershed.

The landforms of the Moultrie Creek watershed were formed with the shorelines of ancient seas. Geologists consider the basin's landforms as a terrace system formed during interglacial periods when ocean levels were 25 to 40 feet above present sea level. What is presently the Moultrie Creek watershed was once a very gradually sloping shoreline-related formation, possibly an offshore bar.

== Flora and fauna ==
According to the "St. Johns County Manatee Protection Plan", the shoreline vegetation, including cordgrass, that occurs along the creeks that flow into the Matanzas River, including Moultrie Creek, may be browsed on by manatees, and consequently it is classed as a prime manatee habitat.

Species of animals that may occur within the drainage basin of Moultrie Creek:

=== Birds ===
- Limpkin (Aramus guarauna)
- Least bittern (Botaurus exilis)
- Kirtland's warbler (Dendroica kirtlandii)
- Reddish egret (Egretta rufescens)
- Snowy egret (Egretta thula)
- Tricolored heron Egretta tricolor)
- White ibis (Eudocimus albus)
- Peregine falcon (Falco peregrinus)
- Southeastern American kestrel (Falco sparverius)
- Florida sandhill crane (Grus canadensis pratensis)
- Bald eagle (Haliaeetus leucocephalus)
- Little blue heron (Egretta caerulea)
- Louisiana heron (Egretta tricolor)
- American oystercatcher (Haematopus palliatus)
- Southern bald eagle (Haliaeetus leucocephalus)
- Wood stork (Mycteria americana)
- Yellow-crowned night heron Nyctanassa violacea)
- Osprey (Pandion haliaetus)
- Brown pelican (Pelecanus occidentalis)
- Roseate spoonbill (Platalea ajaja)
- Least tern (Sterna antillarum)
- Bachman's warbler (Vermivora bachmanii)

=== Reptiles and amphibians ===
- American alligator (Alligator mississippiensis)
- Gopher tortoise (Gopherus polyphemus)
- Eastern indigo snake (Drymarchon corais)
- Gopher frog (Rana capito)

=== Mammals ===
- Florida black bear (Ursus americanus floridanus)

=== Flowers and other plants ===
- Auricled spleenwort (Asplenium auritum)
- Bird's-nest spleenwort (Asplenium serratum)
- Threadroot orchid (Harrisella porrecta)
- Yellow star anise (Illicium parviflorum)
- Florida milkweed; panhandle anglepod (Matelea floridana)
- Pigmy-pipes; sweet pinesap (Monotropsis reynoldsiae)
- Fall-flowering ixia; celestial lily (Nemastylis floridana)
- Polypody fern (Pecluma dispersa)
- Polypody fern (Pecluma plumula)
- Swamp plume polypody (Pecluma ptilodon)
- Blue butterwort (Pinguicula caerulea)
- Large white fringed orchid (Platanthera blephariglottis)
- Golden fringed orchid (Platanthera cristata)
- Southern tubercled orchid; gypsy-spikes (Platanthera flava)
- Snowy orchid; bog torch (Platanthera nivea)
- Rose pogonia (Pogonia ophioglossoides)
- Wild coco; giant orchid (Pteroglossaspis ecristata)
- Hooded pitcherplant (Sarracenia minor)
- American chaffseed (Schwalbea americana)
- Florida ladies' tresses (Spiranthes brevilabris)
- Lace-lip ladies' tresses (Spiranthes laciniata)
