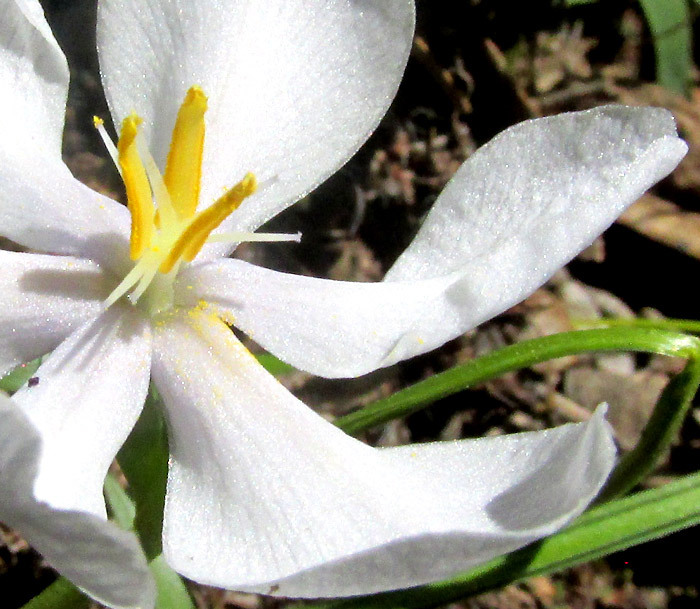

Scientific classification
- Kingdom: Plantae
- Clade: Tracheophytes
- Clade: Angiosperms
- Clade: Monocots
- Order: Asparagales
- Family: Iridaceae
- Genus: Nemastylis
- Species: N. tenuis

Binomial name
- Nemastylis tenuis (Herb.) Benth. & Hook.f. ex S.Watson (1883)

Synonyms
- Chlamydostylus tenuis (Herb.) Baker (1876); Nemastylis coelestina var. tenuis Herb. (1840)

= Nemastylis tenuis =

Species of flowering plant

Nemastylis tenuis, the southwestern pleatleaf, is a member of the family Iridaceae.

== Description ==
Nemastylis tenuis is a perennial herbaceous plant arising from a bulb with a dry, papery outer covering. Usually the stems are simple but can be once-branched. Stems bear one leaf, with other leaves arising at the plant's base; they are very slender and pleated. Inflorescences usually consist of a single flower but there may be a few flowers, and are subtended by a pair of bracts that wrap around the inflorescence's base. The outer bract is up to 2.5cm long (~1 inch), while the inner one reaches up to 4cm long (1½ inch).

Flowers are "star shaped", displaying actinomorphic symmetry, with six narrow, blue to white tepals which are up to 3cm long (~1 1/5 inch and 9mm wide (~1/3 inch). Stamens consist of pollen-producing anthers atop filaments up to 4.5mm long (3/16 inch), with the filaments being united at their bases into a "staminal column". The style usually is shorter than the staminal column, but it bears slender arms up to 3.5 mm long (~1/32 inch). The capsular-type fruits are oblong, up to 25mm long (~1 inch), and open at their tips to release yellow to dark brown, angular seeds up to 2mm long (~3/32 inch).

== Habitat ==
In the USA, Nemastylis tenuis occurs in grasslands and open oak and juniper woodlands at 1600-1900m in elevation (5300-6200 ft). In central Mexico, at elevations of 1500-3050m (~4900-10,000 ft.), it inhabits grassands and clearings adjacent to oak, oak-pine, and pine forests, as well as in subtropical scrublands, and may be associated with swampy areas.

== Distribution ==
The distribution map on the iNaturalist page for Nemastylis tenuis indicates that the species is present in mountainous parts of the southwestern USA -- southern Arizona and western Texas -- and throughout upland Mexico south through Oaxaca state.

== Taxonomy ==
Nemastylis tenuis is very variable in height, flower size, and the tepals' color. The color variations have led to various subspecies and varieties being described, though in Mexico sometimes the range of tepal colors can be seen in a single population. In 2025, five infraspecific names are accepted:

- Nemastylis tenuis var. caerulescens (Greenm.) R.C.Foster
- Nemastylis tenuis var. nana (S.Watson) R.C.Foster
- Nemastylis tenuis subsp. pringlei (S.Watson) Goldblatt
- Nemastylis tenuis var. purpusii R.C.Foster
- Nemastylis tenuis subsp. tenuis

== Etymology ==
The genus name Nemastylis derives from the Ancient Greek nema, meaning "thread", and the Greek stylos, referring to a pillar or rod. In the name they allude to the style with its threadlike arms.

The species name tenuis is from New Latin, meaning "thin", joined with the suffix -ous from Old French, meaning "having, full of, having to do with, doing, inclined to."

== Gallery ==
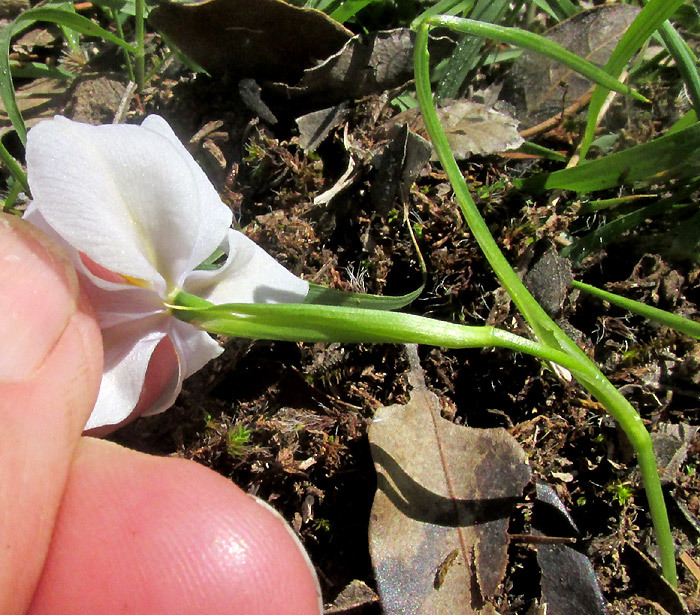
Nemastylis tenuis bracts below flower

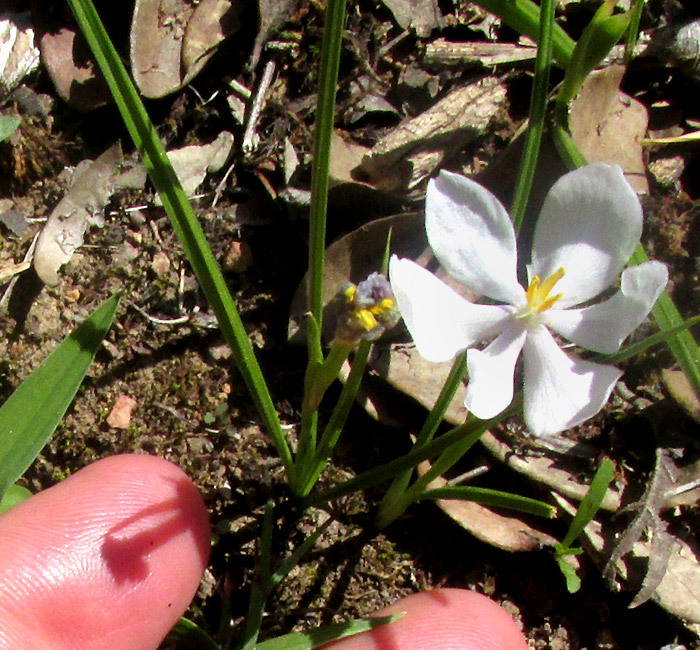
Nemastylis tenuis plant base
