= Ctenium elegans =

Scientific classification
- Kingdom: Plantae
- Clade: Tracheophytes
- Clade: Angiosperms
- Clade: Monocots
- Clade: Commelinids
- Order: Poales
- Family: Poaceae
- Subfamily: Chloridoideae
- Genus: Ctenium
- Species: C. elegans

Binomial name
- Ctenium elegans Kunth, 1829

Subspecies
- Ctenium elegans var. elegans; Ctenium elegans var. longispicatus A. Chev., 1934; Ctenium elegans var. polystachium Vanderyst, 1921

Synonyms
- Campulosus elegans Kuntze

Species of grass

Ctenium elegans is an annual grass species in the genus Ctenium from African savanna areas. It is distributed from Senegal to the Sudan and grows on sandy soils of the South Sahelian and North Sudanian zones.

== Uses ==
The stems are used as materials for roof thatching and for making households products such as baskets, mats and brooms. Less known for use as grazing fodder.
