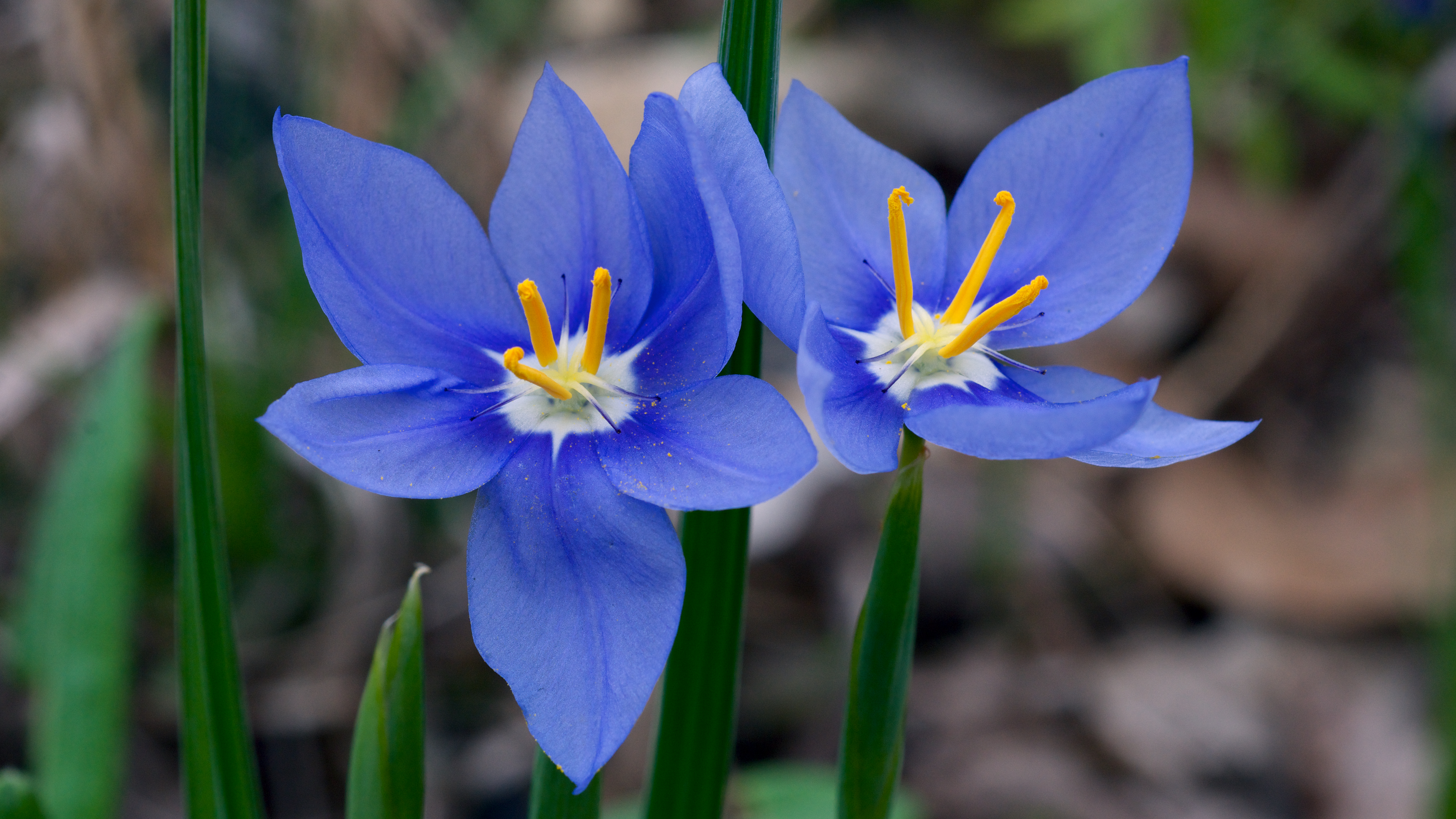

Conservation status
- Apparently Secure (NatureServe)

Scientific classification
- Kingdom: Plantae
- Clade: Tracheophytes
- Clade: Angiosperms
- Clade: Monocots
- Order: Asparagales
- Family: Iridaceae
- Genus: Nemastylis
- Species: N. geminiflora

Binomial name
- Nemastylis geminiflora Nutt.

= Nemastylis geminiflora =

Species of flowering plant

Nemastylis geminiflora, commonly known as prairie celestial, celestial, prairie pleatleaf, or celestial lily is a perennial herb in the Iridaceae (iris) family. It is native to the south-central area of the United States.

== Description ==
N. geminiflora grows to a height of 30 centimetres (12 in), sometimes taller, with stems growing from a bulb deep in the ground. Each stem is clasped by 1 to 4 narrow, linear leaves. The leaves are long and narrow, up to 11 centimetres (4 in) wide, folded lengthwise near the base and pleated along the veins or flat near the top. Flowers are 6.5 centimetres (2.6 in) long, in the shape of a star with 6 blue-violet or blue pointed petals and sepals. 1 or 2 flowers emerge from a common spathe, or sheath. Each flower lasts only one day, opening up in the late morning and closing mid-afternoon.

== Distribution and habitat ==
The plant is native to Alabama, Arkansas, Kansas, Louisiana, Missouri, Mississippi, Oklahoma, Tennessee, and Texas. The plant occurs in limestone glades, prairies, and rocky slopes.

== Ecology ==
N. geminiflora is pollinated by bees, flies, and other insects, which gather nectar from the flowers. Flowers appear in April and May.

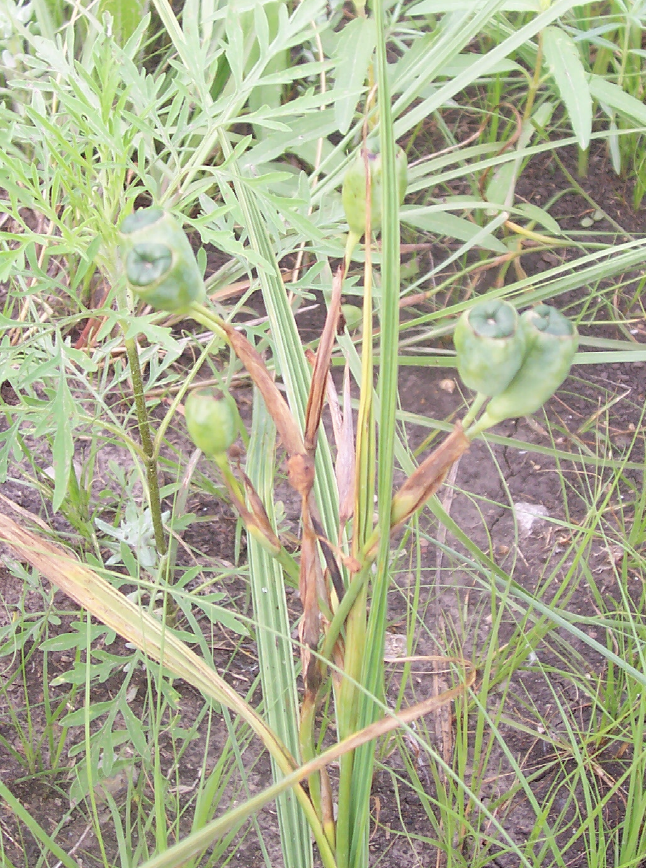
Nemastylis geminiflora fruit

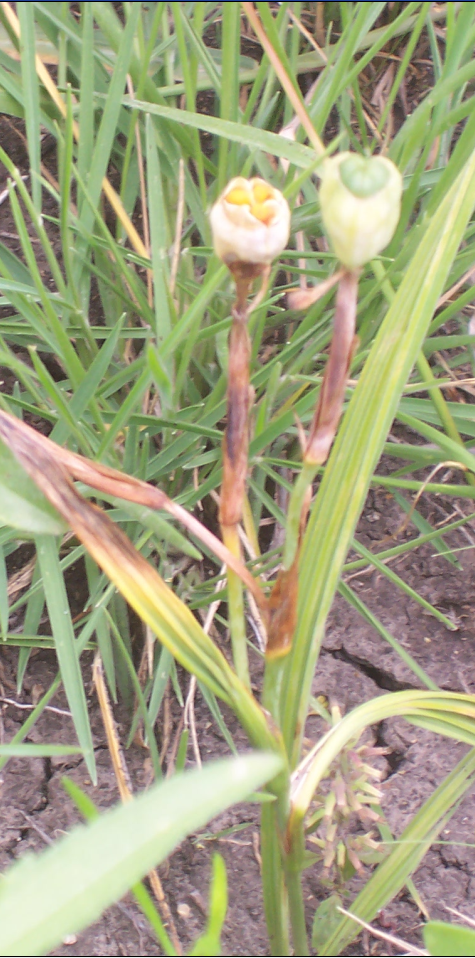
Nemastylis geminiflora dehiscent fruit

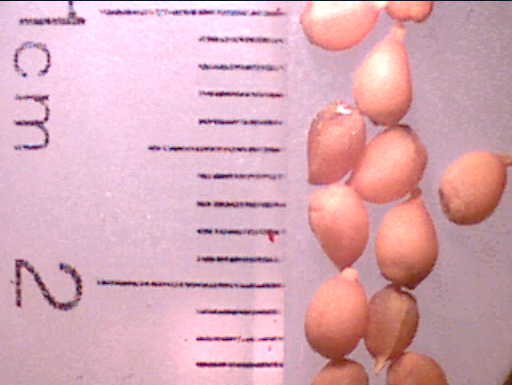
Nemastylis geminiflora seeds
