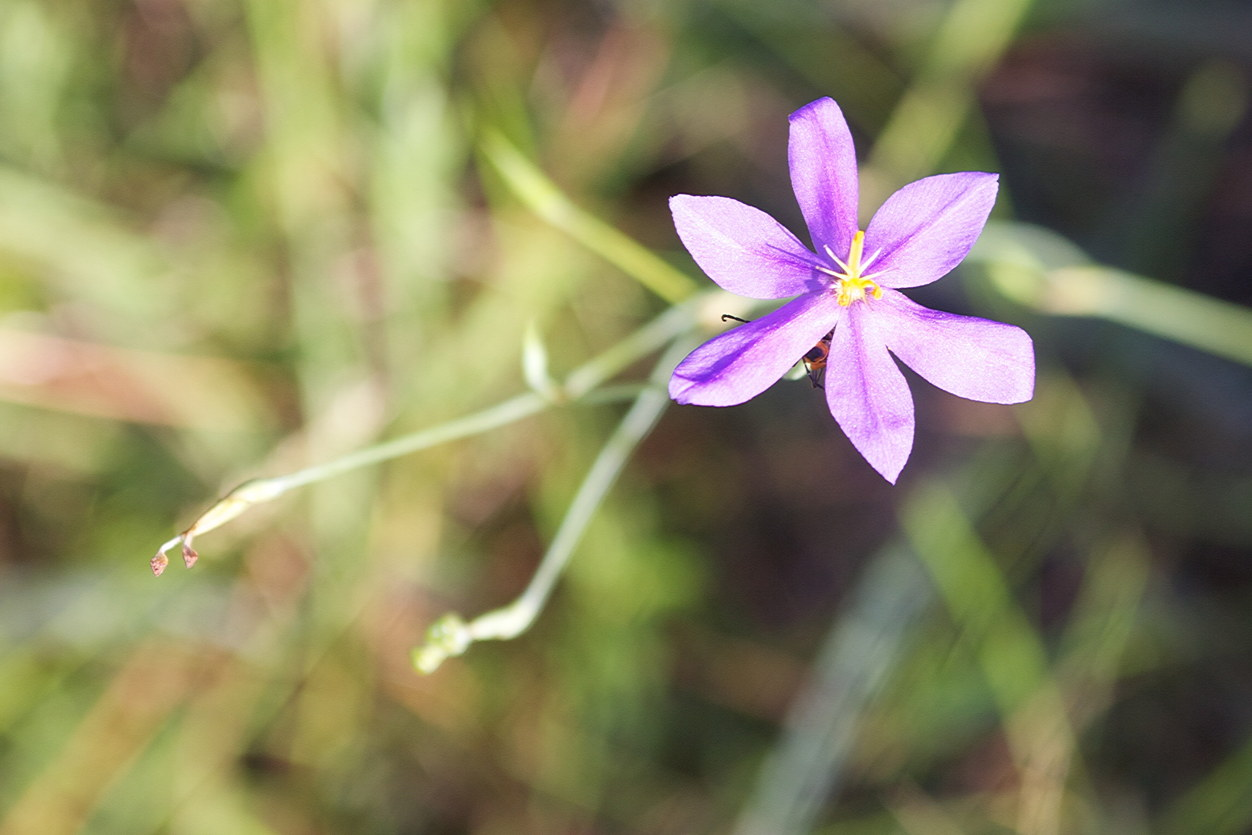
- Nemastylis floridana

Scientific classification
- Kingdom: Plantae
- Clade: Tracheophytes
- Clade: Angiosperms
- Clade: Monocots
- Order: Asparagales
- Family: Iridaceae
- Subfamily: Iridoideae
- Tribe: Tigridieae
- Genus: Nemastylis; Nuttall

Type species
- Nemastylis geminiflora Nuttall

Synonyms
- Chlamydostylus Baker

= Nemastylis =

Genus of flowering plants

Nemastylis, or pleatleaf, is a genus of flowering plants in the family Iridaceae, first described as a genus in 1835. It is native to Mexico, Central America, and the southern part of the United States. The genus name is derived from the Greek words nema, meaning "thread", and stylos, meaning "pillar" or "rod".

Species

- Nemastylis floridana Small - Florida
- Nemastylis geminiflora Nutt. - south-central United States
- Nemastylis nuttallii Pickering ex R.C. Foster - Texas, Oklahoma, Arkansas, Missouri
- Nemastylis selidandra Ravenna - Texas
- Nemastylis tenuis (Herb.) S.Watson - Mexico, Guatemala, Honduras, Texas, Arizona
- Nemastylis tuitensis (Aarón Rodr. & Ortiz-Cat.) Ravenna - Jalisco State in Mexico

formerly included

- Nemastylis pearcei Baker = Tigridia pearcei (Baker) Ravenna
- Nemastylis mcvaughii Molseed & Cruden = Tigridia convoluta (Ravenna) Goldblatt
