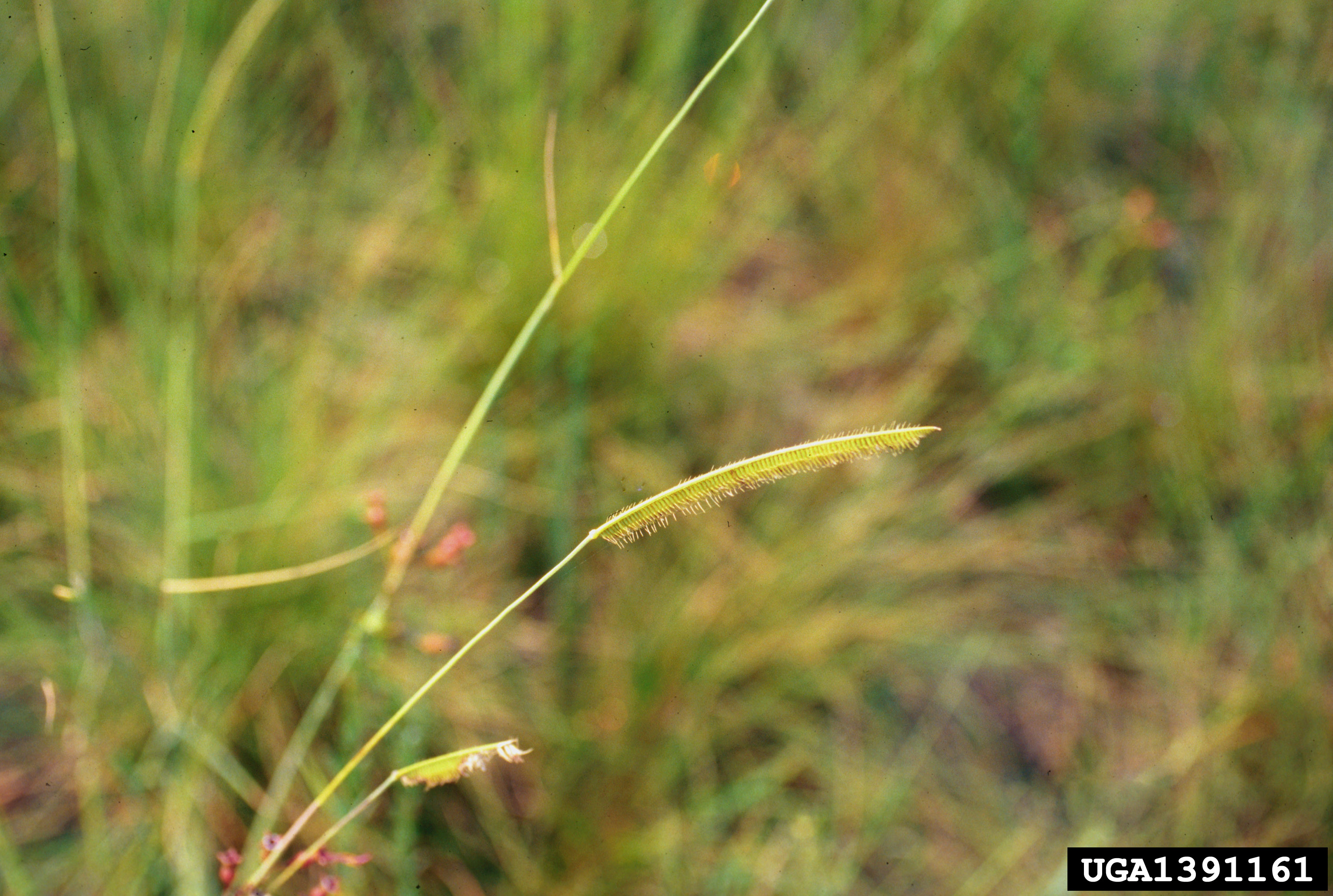

Conservation status
- Secure (NatureServe)

Scientific classification
- Kingdom: Plantae
- Clade: Tracheophytes
- Clade: Angiosperms
- Clade: Monocots
- Clade: Commelinids
- Order: Poales
- Family: Poaceae
- Subfamily: Chloridoideae
- Genus: Ctenium
- Species: C. aromaticum

Binomial name
- Ctenium aromaticum (Walter) Alph.Wood

= Ctenium aromaticum =

Species of grass

Ctenium aromaticum is a species of grass known by the common name toothache grass. It is native to the southeastern United States, where it grows on the coastal plain.

This is a perennial grass that forms clumps of stems reaching 1 to 1.5 meters (3 ft 3 in to 4 ft 11 in) in maximum height. The leaves are up to 46 centimeters (18 in) long. The inflorescence is a panicle with one branch that is up to 15 centimeters (5.9 in) long and lined on one side with two rows of spikelets. Each spikelet is roughly 1 centimeter (0.39 in) long.

It is not known whether or not the grass was ever used as a remedy for toothache. It has, however, been used as a sialagogue, an agent that increases saliva. The crushed roots have a strong scent. The lower part of the stem produces a numbing sensation when it is chewed. The agents responsible for this action are isobutylamides.
