= King's Road (Florida) =

Road in colonial East Florida

Route information
- Length: 150 mi (240 km)
- Existed: 1765–1773–present

Major junctions
- From: Colerain, Georgia
- To: New Smyrna, Florida

Location
- Country: United States

Highway system
- Post Roads in the United States

The King's Road was a road built by the British in their colony of East Florida. It stretched from the St. Marys River, the border between East Florida and Georgia, to south of New Smyrna, and was mostly completed by 1773.

The King's Road originated as an Indian trail on a high sand ridge paralleling the Atlantic coast. South of St. Augustine it passed westward around the navigable sections of Moultrie Creek and Moses Creek, and then crossed the wetlands that ran along the Matanzas River south of Pellicer Creek on built-up causeways.

== History ==
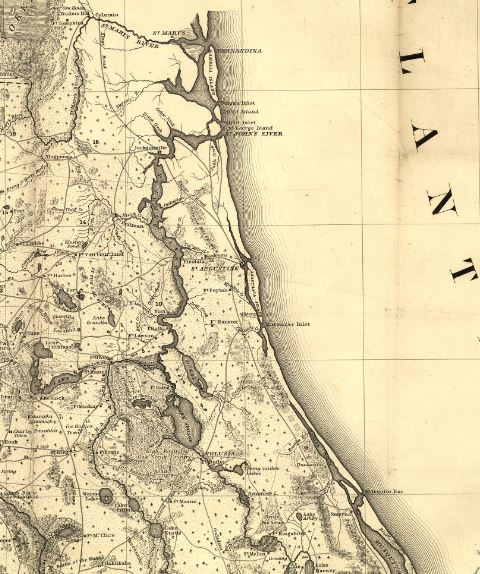
Section of a map showing King's Road in the Territory of Florida, by the United States Army Corps of Engineers, published in 1839.

When the first governor of British East Florida, Col. James Grant, arrived in the capital, St. Augustine, on August 29, 1764, almost the entire Spanish population of the town had emigrated to Cuba and elsewhere in New Spain. More than 3,700 people had left St. Augustine and its outposts when Florida was ceded to the British in 1763. Grant was immediately concerned about the poor state of the few roads in the province, knowing that new settlers from the other colonies would require passable roads for the wagons that carried their families and belongings.

With inadequate funds available for constructing a road to reach those lands granted by the Crown for the establishment of plantations on the waterways near the coast, Grant raised a public subscription to finance the project. He secured five hundred guineas by July 1765 to build the road from New Smyrna to Colerain, Georgia, and a promise by the Georgia colonial assembly to build a road from Fort Barrington to the St. Marys River.

In 1765, Jonathon Bryan, a wealthy Georgia planter who was also a skilled surveyor, rode on horseback from St. Augustine to the Cowford (now Jacksonville) in search of the most suitable course for that section of the proposed road. From the cattle crossing at this narrows of the St. Johns River he rode north through cypress swamps and across the south branch of the Nassau River, observing that this route would require several bridges and a causeway over the lowlands. He offered to build such a roadway with slave labor for £1,100, but because of the lack of funds in his allotted budget, Governor Grant was forced to decline. The northern portion of what would become the King's Road in Florida, stretching from the St. Johns to the St. Marys rivers, was finally constructed by the East Florida rice planters Charles and Jermyn Wright, brothers of Sir James Wright, the Royal Governor of Georgia. The works were begun in 1764 under the supervision of Capt. John Fairlamb and his nephew, Joshua Yallowby, and completed in 1775.

Construction of the highway south of St. Augustine was under the supervision of John Moultrie, now Lieutenant Governor of East Florida, who had recently come from South Carolina with his family and slaves. Moultrie wrote Governor Grant on March 23, 1765, "You may depend on my utmost endeavors to forward the road, but believe no one will undertake till fall...". A serviceable road was not completed until late 1767, however. It was built mainly for the benefit of Dr. Andrew Turnbull, a Scottish entrepreneur who with Sir William Duncan organized a company in England to establish a large plantation south of Mosquito Inlet called New Smyrna. Fifteen hundred Greeks, Italians, and Minorcans were indentured to work for the company and settle there; those who survived the harsh conditions and treatment they endured fled to St. Augustine on the King's Road in 1777.

Travelers on the King's Road crossed the narrowest part of the lower St. Johns River at the Cowford (now Jacksonville) by ferry, and continued south. During the American Revolution, American troops used this route to attack British forces. The most notable of these skirmishes was the Battle of Alligator Creek Bridge, near present-day Callahan, on June 30, 1778.

The King's Road had mostly reverted to wilderness by 1821, when the United States took possession of the former Spanish colony. The United States Army rebuilt the Kings Road between 1828 and 1831.
