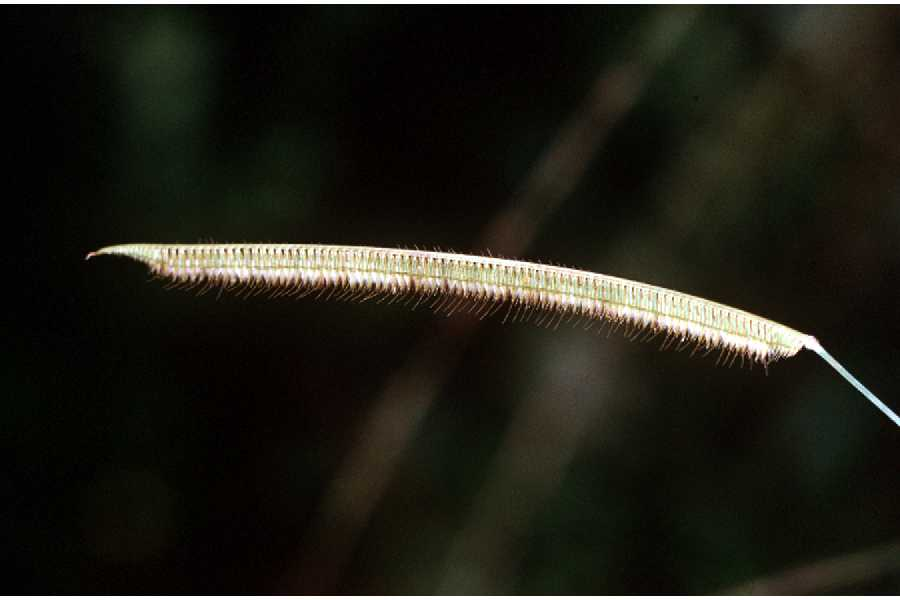
- Ctenium aromaticum

Scientific classification
- Kingdom: Plantae
- Clade: Tracheophytes
- Clade: Angiosperms
- Clade: Monocots
- Clade: Commelinids
- Order: Poales
- Family: Poaceae
- Subfamily: Chloridoideae
- Tribe: Cynodonteae
- Subtribe: Cteniinae; P.M.Peterson, Romasch. & Y.Herrera
- Genus: Ctenium; Panz. 1813 not C.E.O. Jensen 1923

Type species
- Ctenium carolinianum (syn of C. aromaticum) Panz.

Synonyms
- Aplocera Raf.; Campuloa Desv.; Campulosus Desv.; Monathera Raf.; Monocera Elliott; Triatherus Raf.

= Ctenium =

Genus of grasses

Ctenium is a genus of African and American plants in the grass family.

Species

- Ctenium aromaticum (Walter) Alph.Wood - United States from Texas to New Jersey
- Ctenium bahiense Longhi-Wagner - Bahia
- Ctenium brachystachyum (Nees) Kunth - Brazil, Paraguay
- Ctenium brevispicatum J.G.Sm. - Brazil
- Ctenium canescens Benth. West Africa
- Ctenium chapadense (Trin.) Döll - Brazil
- Ctenium cirrhosum (Nees) Kunth - Brazil, Suriname
- Ctenium concinnum Nees - Africa incl Madagascar
- Ctenium concissum Swallen - Panama, Colombia, Brazil, Bolivia
- Ctenium crista-castrensis (Hedw.) C.E.O. Jensen - United States, Canada
- Ctenium elegans Kunth - Africa
- Ctenium floridanum (Hitchc.) Hitchc. - Georgia, Florida
- Ctenium ledermannii Pilg. - central Africa
- Ctenium longiglume Kupicha ex Longhi-Wagner & Cope - Burundi, Zaïre, Zambia
- Ctenium newtonii Hack. - Africa
- Ctenium planifolium (J.Presl) Kunth - central + southern Mexico
- Ctenium plumosum (Hitchc.) Swallen - western Mexico
- Ctenium polystachyum Balansa - Brazil, Paraguay
- Ctenium sesquiflorum Clayton - Guinea, Liberia
- Ctenium villosum Berhaut - West Africa

formerly included

see Dactyloctenium Enteropogon Tetrapogon

- Ctenium digitatum - Enteropogon dolichostachyus
- Ctenium indicum - Tetrapogon tenellus
- Ctenium nukaviense - Dactyloctenium aegyptium
- Ctenium rupestre - Enteropogon rupestris
- Ctenium sechellense - Enteropogon sechellensis
