= Nemastylis nuttallii =

Scientific classification
- Kingdom: Plantae
- Clade: Tracheophytes
- Clade: Angiosperms
- Clade: Monocots
- Order: Asparagales
- Family: Iridaceae
- Genus: Nemastylis
- Species: N. nuttallii

Binomial name
- Nemastylis nuttallii Pickering ex R.C.Foster 1945

Species of flowering plant

Nemastylis nuttallii, the Nuttall's pleatleaf, Ozark celestial-lily or pine woods lily, is a plant species native to Arkansas, Missouri and Oklahoma in the south-central United States. Some authors have mistakenly called this species N. coelestina.

Nemastylis nuttallii is a bulb-forming perennial herb up to 40 cm (3 feet) tall. Stems are usually unbranched. Leaves are very narrow and linear. Flowers are pale blue, opening in the evening.
