= Laurel oak =

Laurel oak may refer to two species of trees native to the southeastern United States:

- Quercus hemisphaerica, sometimes called sand laurel oak or Darlington oak
- Quercus laurifolia, sometimes called swamp laurel oak, diamond-leaf oak, obtusa oak, or water oak
