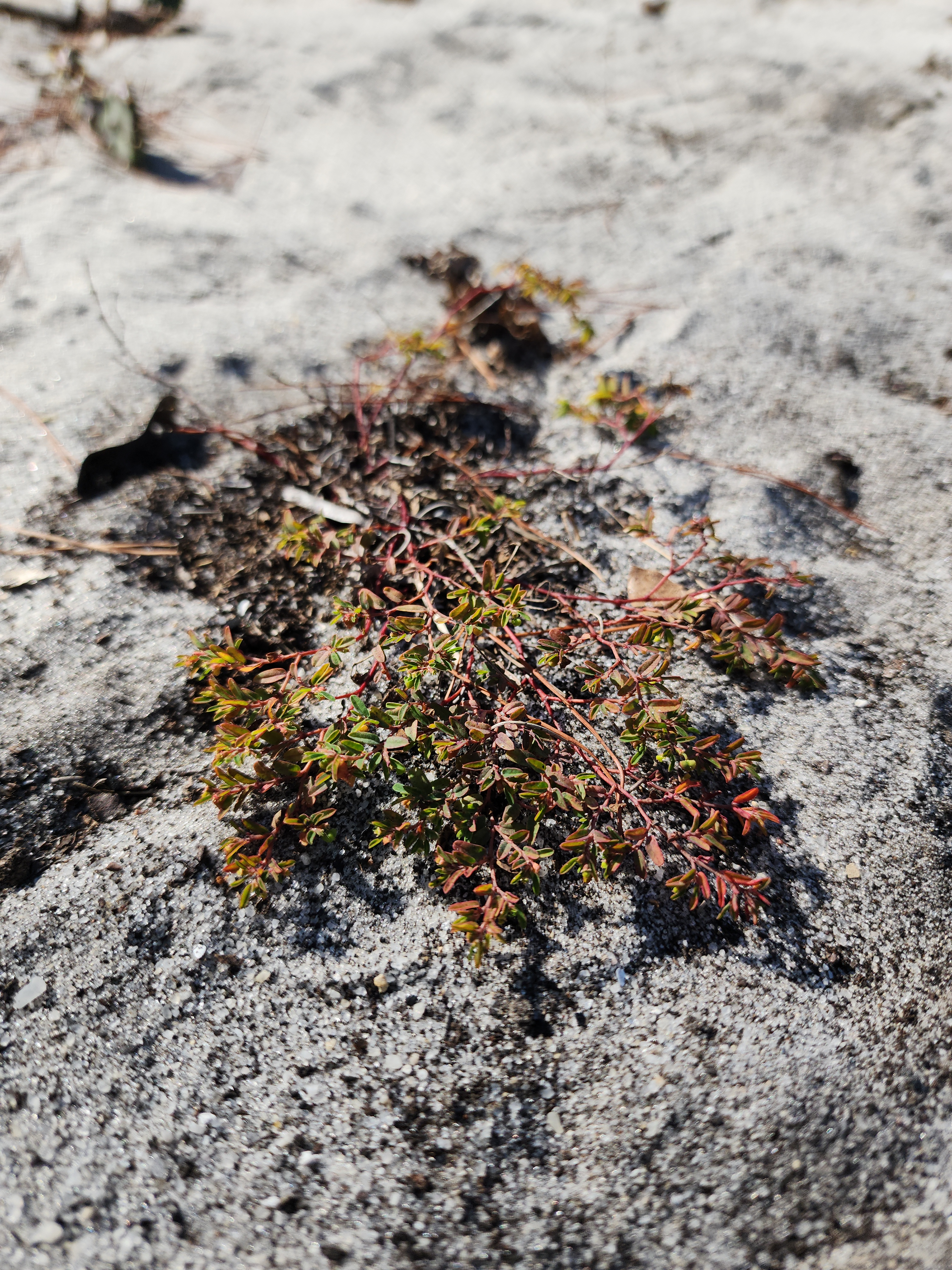
- Persisting in degraded coastal scrub

Conservation status
- Imperiled (NatureServe)

Scientific classification
- Kingdom: Plantae
- Clade: Tracheophytes
- Clade: Angiosperms
- Clade: Eudicots
- Clade: Rosids
- Order: Malpighiales
- Family: Euphorbiaceae
- Genus: Euphorbia
- Species: E. cumulicola

Binomial name
- Euphorbia cumulicola (Small)Oudejans

= Euphorbia cumulicola =

Species of flowering plant

Euphorbia cumulicola, commonly referred to as coastal dune sandmat or sand dune spurge, is a rare species of flowering plant endemic to the coastal regions of the US states of Florida and a very narrow region of Georgia.

== Habitat ==
It only occurs in the sandy, fire-dependent habitats of the extreme southeastern United States coasts, including dunes, coastal scrub, and scrubby flatwoods. Its sole occurrence in Georgia is known from Cumberland Island in Camden County.

== Conservation ==
The species faces a high degree of threat, primarily from habitat loss from development for real estate, fire suppression, offroad vehicle use, storm surge, and sea level rise.
