= Ctenium floridanum =

Conservation status
- Imperiled (NatureServe)

Scientific classification
- Kingdom: Plantae
- Clade: Embryophytes
- Clade: Tracheophytes
- Clade: Spermatophytes
- Clade: Angiosperms
- Clade: Monocots
- Clade: Commelinids
- Order: Poales
- Family: Poaceae
- Subfamily: Chloridoideae
- Genus: Ctenium
- Species: C. floridanum

Binomial name
- Ctenium floridanum (Hitchc.) Hitchc.

Species of grasses

Ctenium floridanum (common name: Florida orangegrass or Florida toothache grass) is a species of plant in the grass family found in the Southeastern United States.

In the U.S. state of in Georgia, it is found in moist pine barrens.

== Uses ==
As the common name suggests, Florida toothache grass has been used as a folk remedy to treat toothaches.
