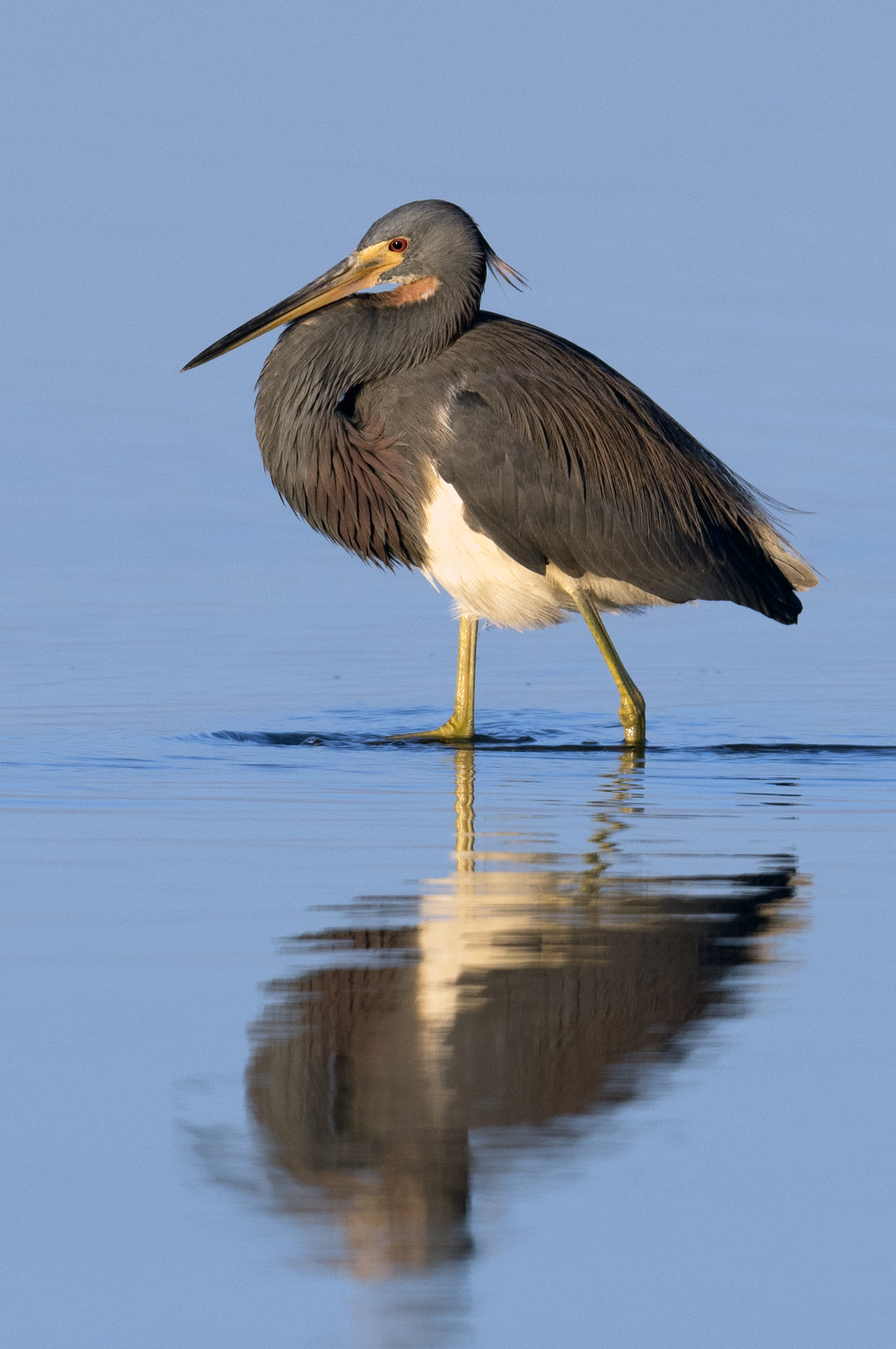
- A tricolored heron in full breeding plumage.

Conservation status
- Least Concern (IUCN 3.1)

Scientific classification
- Kingdom: Animalia
- Phylum: Chordata
- Class: Aves
- Order: Pelecaniformes
- Family: Ardeidae
- Genus: Egretta
- Species: E. tricolor

Binomial name
- Egretta tricolor (Müller, 1776)
- Range of E. tricolor Breeding range Year-round range Wintering range

Synonyms
- Ardea tricolor Müller, 1776; Hydranassa tricolor (Müller, 1776); Hydranassa tricolor subsp. tricolor Stotz et al., 1996

= Tricolored heron =

Species of bird

The tricolored heron (Egretta tricolor), formerly known as the Louisiana heron, is a small species of heron native to coastal parts of the Americas. The species is more solitary than other species of heron in the Americas and eats a diet consisting mostly of small fish.

== Habitat, breeding, and distribution ==
Tricolored herons breed in swamps and other coastal habitats and nests in colonies, often with other herons, usually on platforms of sticks in trees or shrubs. In each clutch, three to seven eggs are typically laid. The tricolored heron is the second most coastal heron in the United States.

The species' range follows the northeastern United States, south along the coast, through the Gulf of Mexico and the Caribbean, to northern South America as far south as Brazil. In the Pacific region, it ranges from Peru to California, but it is only a nonbreeding visitor to the far north.

It was likely the most numerous heron in North America until the cattle egret arrived to the continent in the 1950s. While the species' population appears to be on the decline, it remains quite common. The bird is listed as "Threatened" by the Florida Fish and Wildlife Conservation Commission.

== Description ==
This species measures from 56 to 76 cm (22 to 30 in) long and has a typical wingspan of 96 cm (38 in). The slightly larger male heron weighs 415 g (14.6 oz) on average, while the female averages 334 g (11.8 oz). It is a medium-large, long-legged, long-necked heron with a long, pointed, yellowish or greyish bill with a black tip. In breeding plumage, some individuals will develop a stark bicolored bill which is blue and black at the tip. Its legs and feet turn from dark yellow in nonbreeding birds to pink in breeding adults. The plumage of the triclolored heron changes dramatically from its juvenile form to its adult form.

Adults have a blue-grey head, neck, back, and upper wings, with a white line along the neck. The belly is white. In breeding plumage, they have long, blue, filamentous plumes on their heads and necks, and buff ones on their backs.

== Behavior and diet ==
The tricolored heron is more solitary when foraging than other North American herons. When it forages for its prey, it is typically belly-deep in water, alone or at the edge of a mixed flock. Kent (1986) found that the diets of tricolored herons in Florida consisted of 99.7% fish and prawns. While other members of Egretta may also eat crabs and opportunistically forage for terrestrial arthropods, the tricolored heron has been consistently observed to be almost exclusively piscivorous, primarily feeding on members of Cyprinodontidae, Fundulidae and Poeciliidae, as well as Centropomidae and Cichlidae.

== Gallery ==
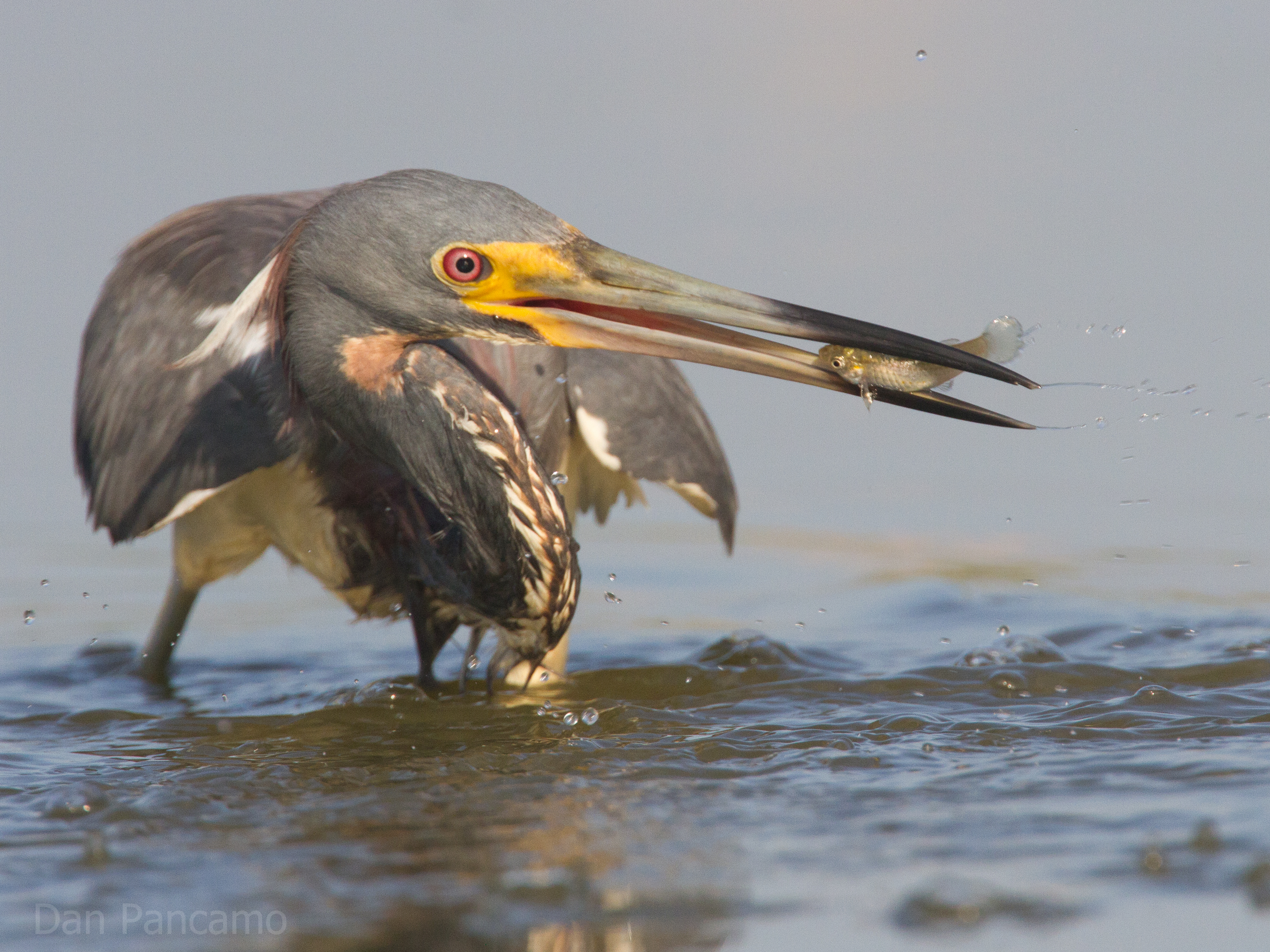
Feeding

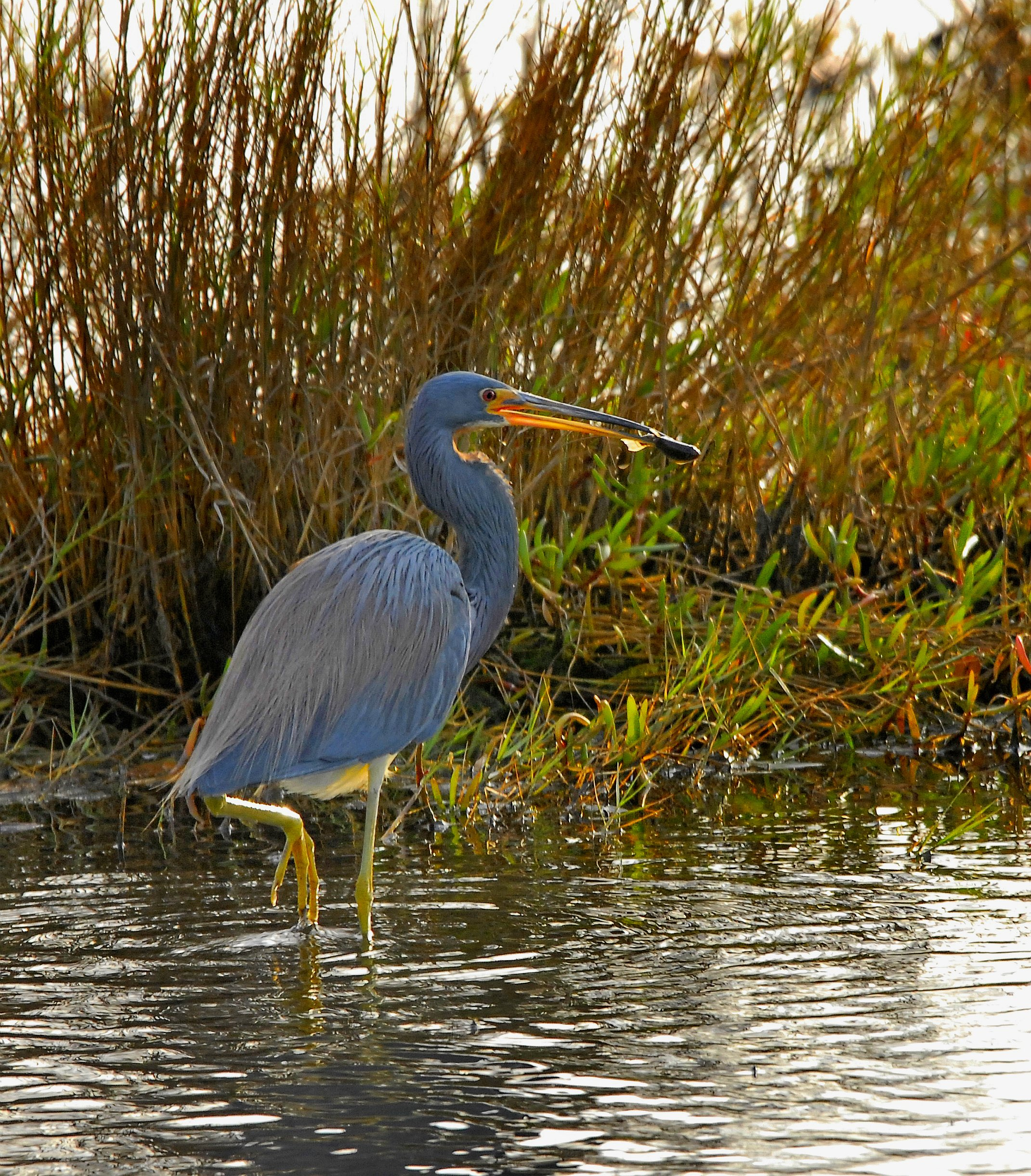
Marco Island, Florida

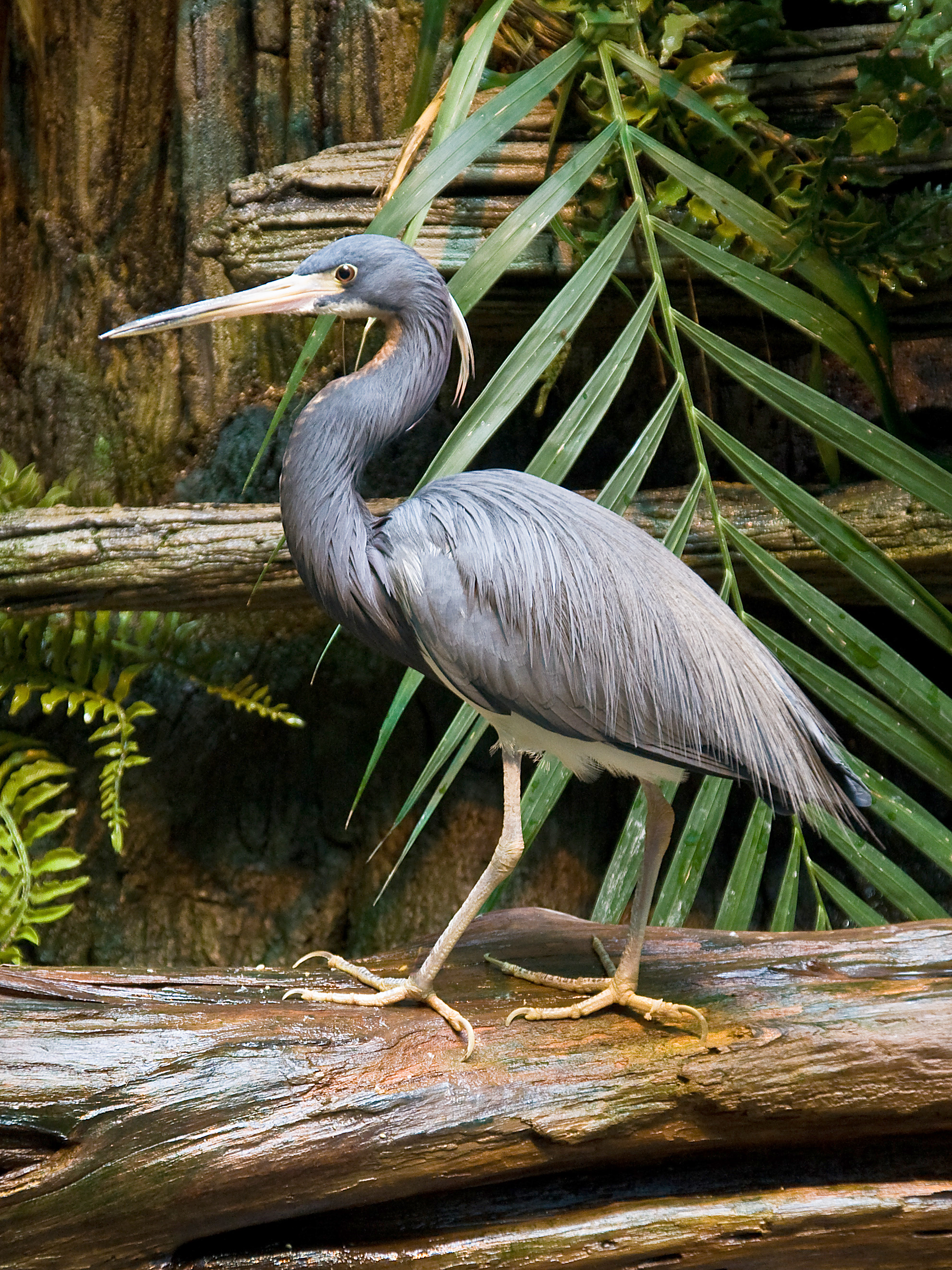

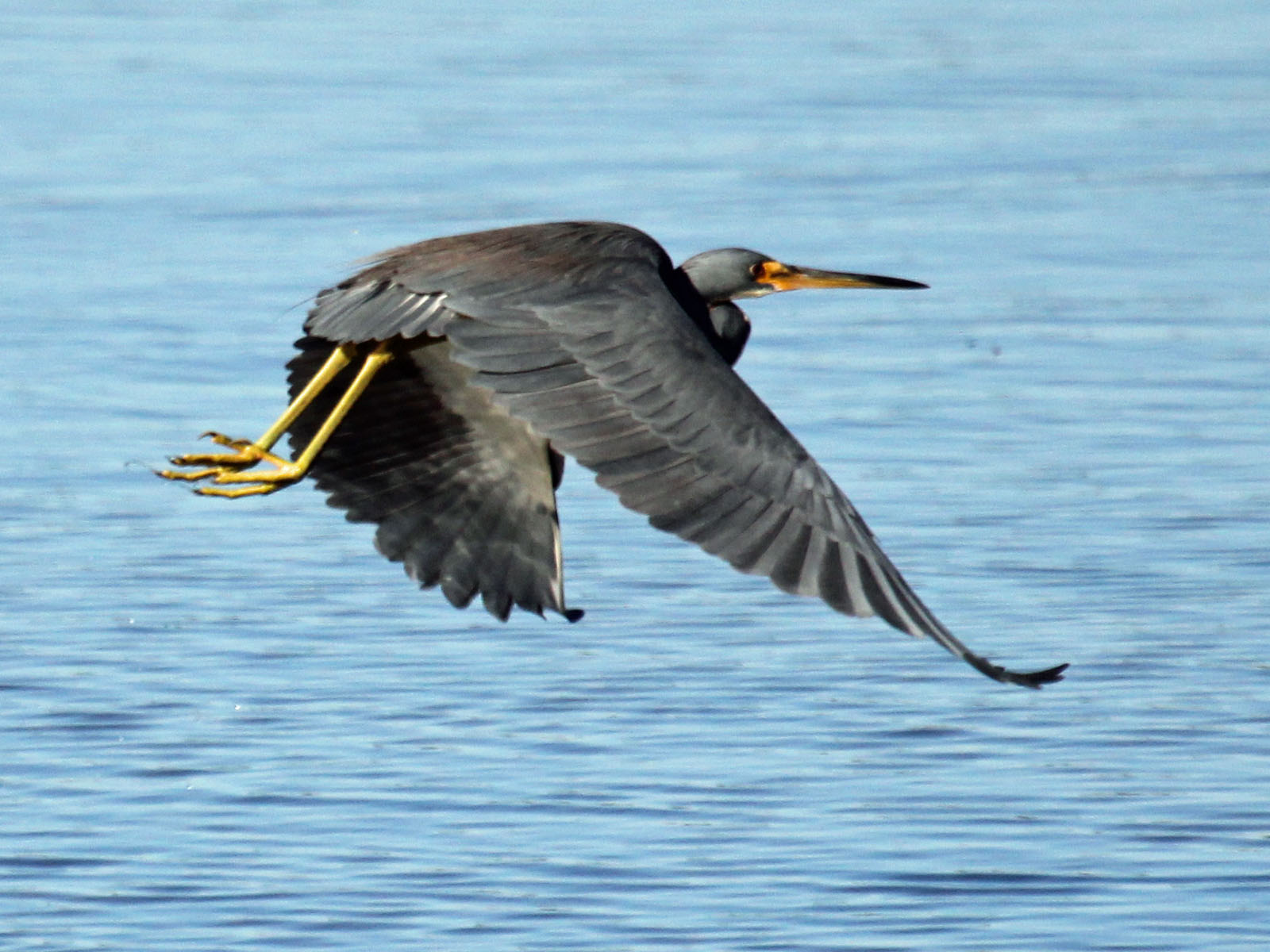
Flying

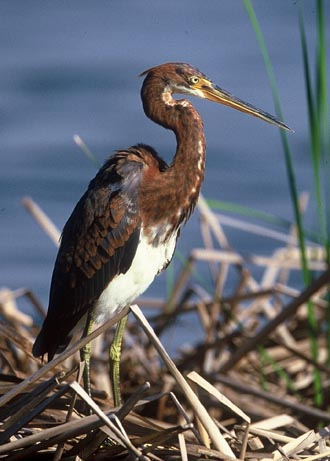
Juvenile

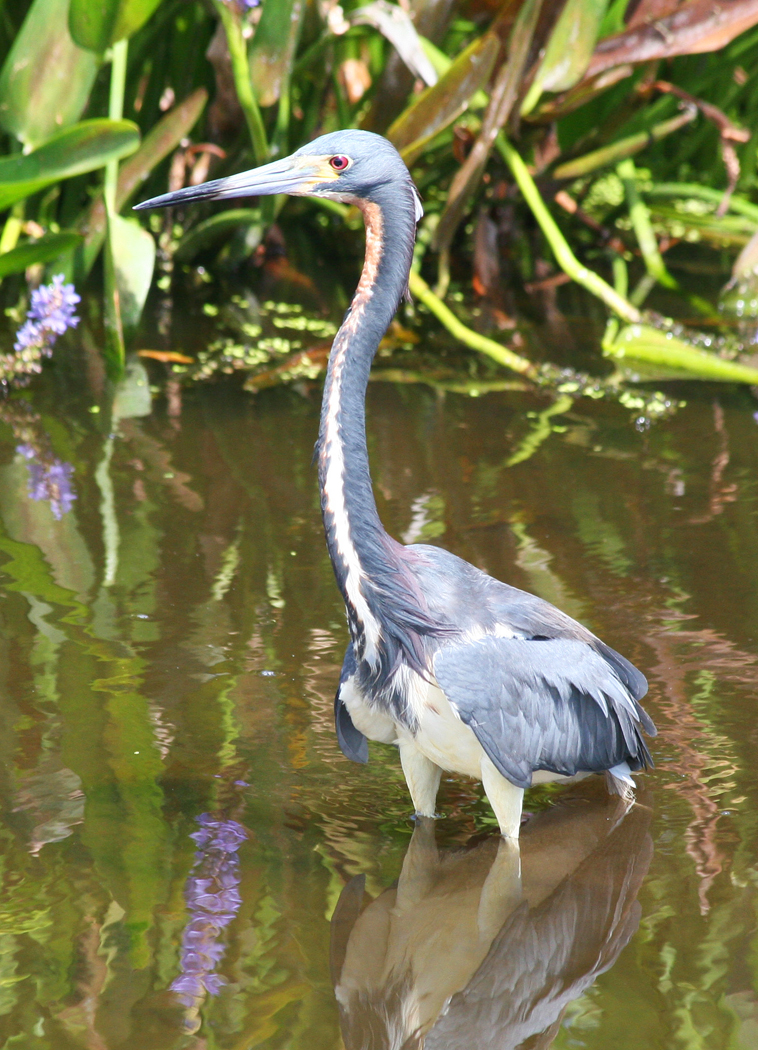

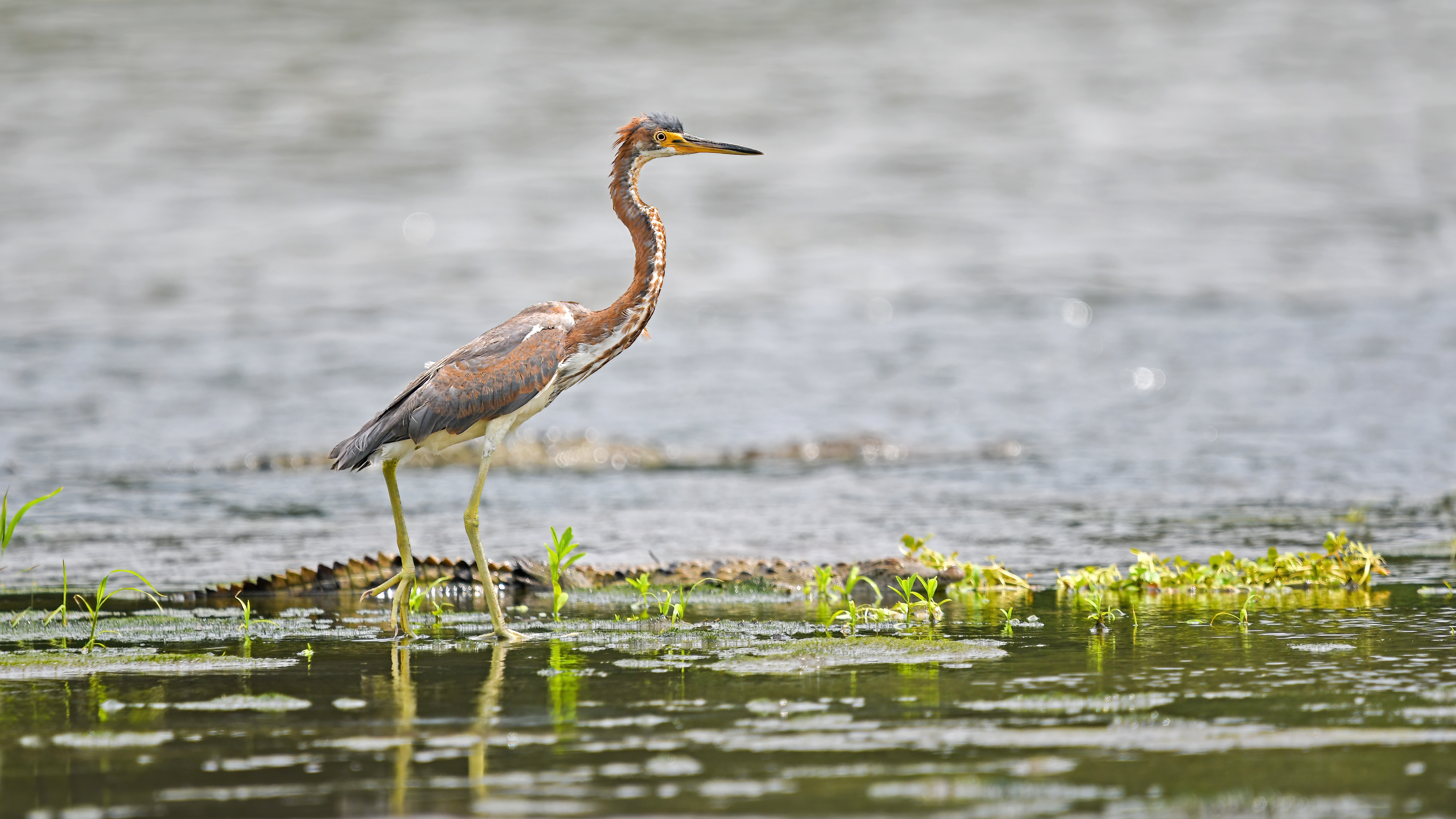
Between the crocodiles Tortuguero, Costa Rica

== Predation ==
In Florida, tricolored herons may be eaten by some growth stage of invasive snakes like Burmese pythons, reticulated pythons, Southern African rock pythons, Central African rock pythons, boa constrictors, yellow anacondas, Bolivian anacondas, dark-spotted anacondas, and green anacondas.
