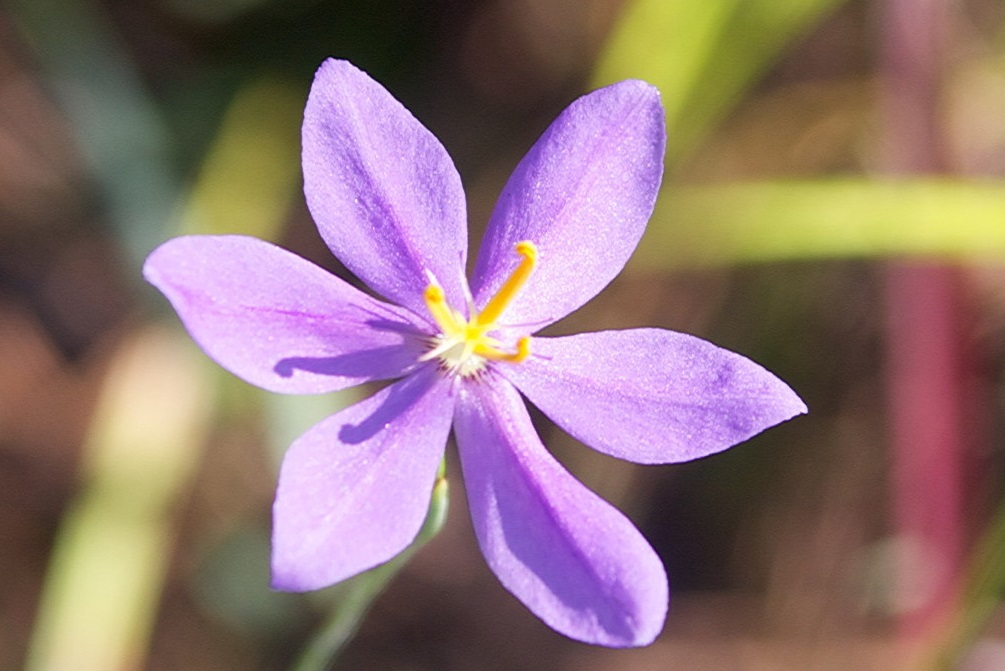

Conservation status
- Imperiled (NatureServe)

Scientific classification
- Kingdom: Plantae
- Clade: Tracheophytes
- Clade: Angiosperms
- Clade: Monocots
- Order: Asparagales
- Family: Iridaceae
- Genus: Nemastylis
- Species: N. floridana

Binomial name
- Nemastylis floridana Small

= Nemastylis floridana =

Species of flowering plant

Nemastylis floridana is a species of flowering plant in the family Iridaceae known by the common names Florida celestial, fallflowering pleatleaf, and fallflowering ixia. It is endemic to Florida in the United States, where it faces many threats to its existence, but so far remains viable.

This is the only Nemastylis in Florida. The plant is a perennial herb producing a thin stem up to 1.5 meters long from a bulb up to 1.5 centimeters wide. The stem generally has a few branches and a few linear-shaped leaves no wider than 1 centimeter. The basal leaves are the longest, up to 4 or 5 centimeters long, while those near the ends of the stem branches are much reduced. The inflorescence is a rhipidium usually containing two flowers. The flower has six dark blue tepals each up to 2 centimeters long. The fruit is a capsule which may reach nearly a centimeter in length.

Flowering occurs in summer and early fall. The flower itself opens in the afternoon, between 3:30 pm and 6:30 pm, but usually between 4:00 and 6:00 pm. The flowers are pollinated by bees, particularly the females of two species of halictids.

This plant grows in wet, swampy habitat types. It can be found along marshes and in hammocks and flatwoods amongst saw palmettos and cabbage palms.

A local endemic, this plant has been reported from thirteen counties in eastern Florida; it is now thought to be extirpated from Broward County. It is mainly distributed in the St. Johns River drainage. There are several occurrences; one count confirms 23. Some are quite large, and the plant is abundant in a few areas of well-maintained habitat. Threats to its survival are thought to be serious, however, with the degradation and destruction of Florida's wildlands being the main problem. Related threats include the draining and clearing of habitat for residential, commercial, and agricultural development, roadside maintenance, and fire suppression in remaining patches of wildfire-adapted ecosystems. The latter issue is a problem because the plant apparently depends on fire events to clear the landscape every few years; large blooms of the species can still be seen in the seasons following a fire.
