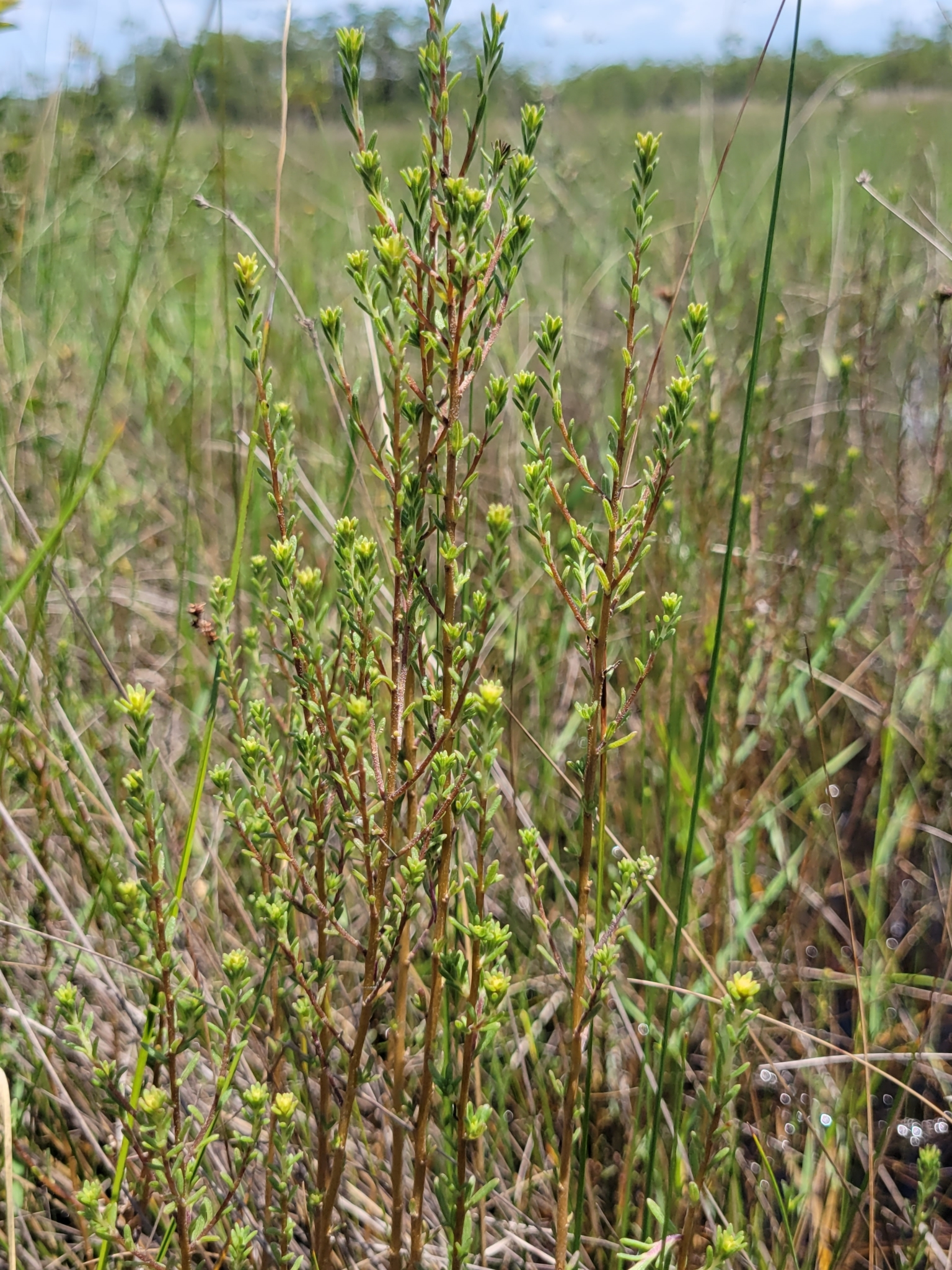

Scientific classification
- Kingdom: Plantae
- Clade: Tracheophytes
- Clade: Angiosperms
- Clade: Eudicots
- Clade: Asterids
- Order: Asterales
- Family: Asteraceae
- Genus: Iva
- Species: I. microcephala

Binomial name
- Iva microcephala Nutt.

= Iva microcephala =

Species of flowering plant

Iva microcephala, the piedmont marsh elder or small-headed marsh-elder, is a North American species of flowering plants in the family Asteraceae. It grows in the southeastern United States in Alabama, Florida, Georgia, and the Carolinas.

Iva microcephala is a wind-pollinated annual herb sometimes as much as 100 cm (40 inches) in height. Leaves are very narrow, sometimes thread-like, up to 6 cm (2.4 inches) long. Flower heads are small, clustered in elongated arrays at the tips of branches, each head containing only about 5-8 flowers.
