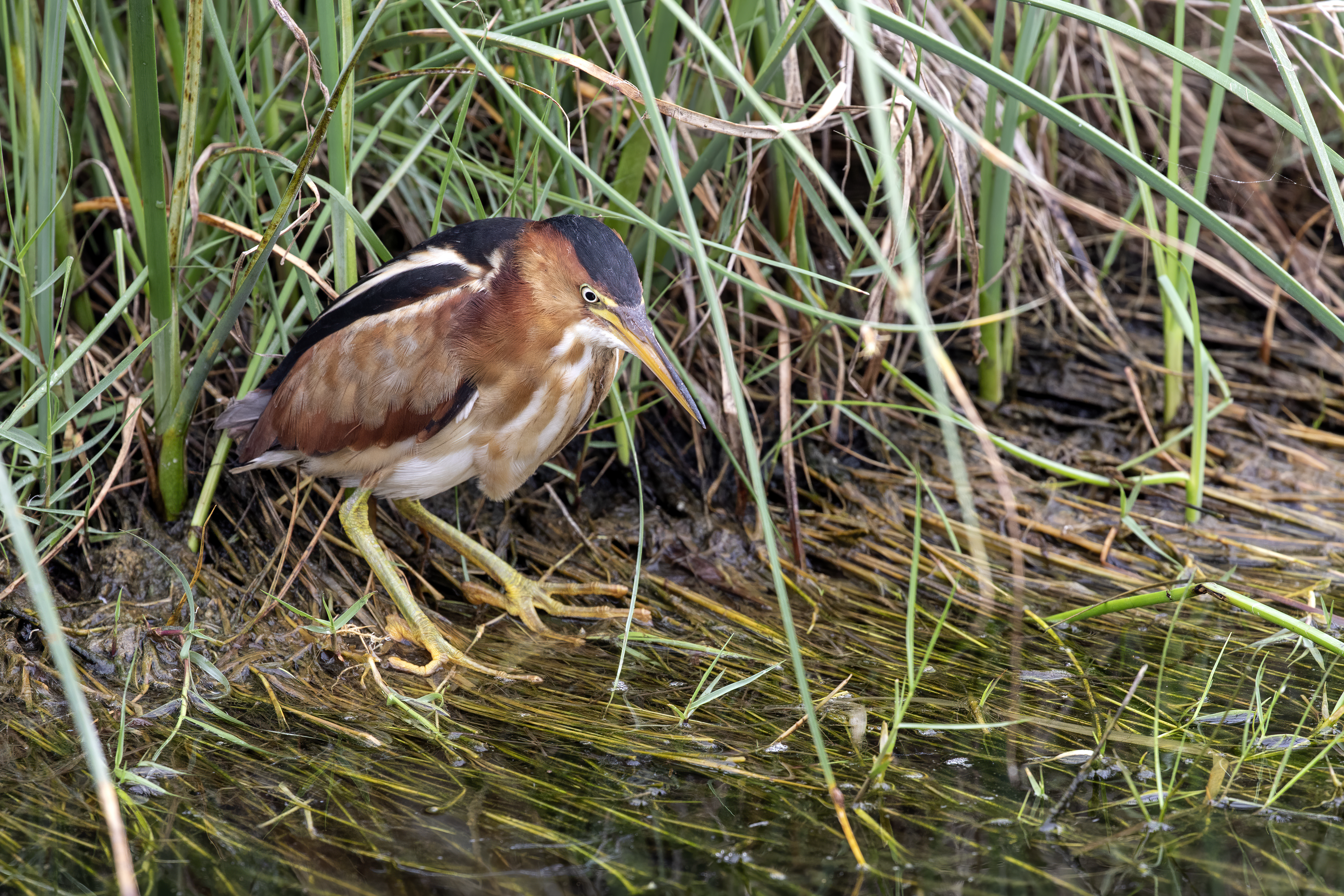
- Male
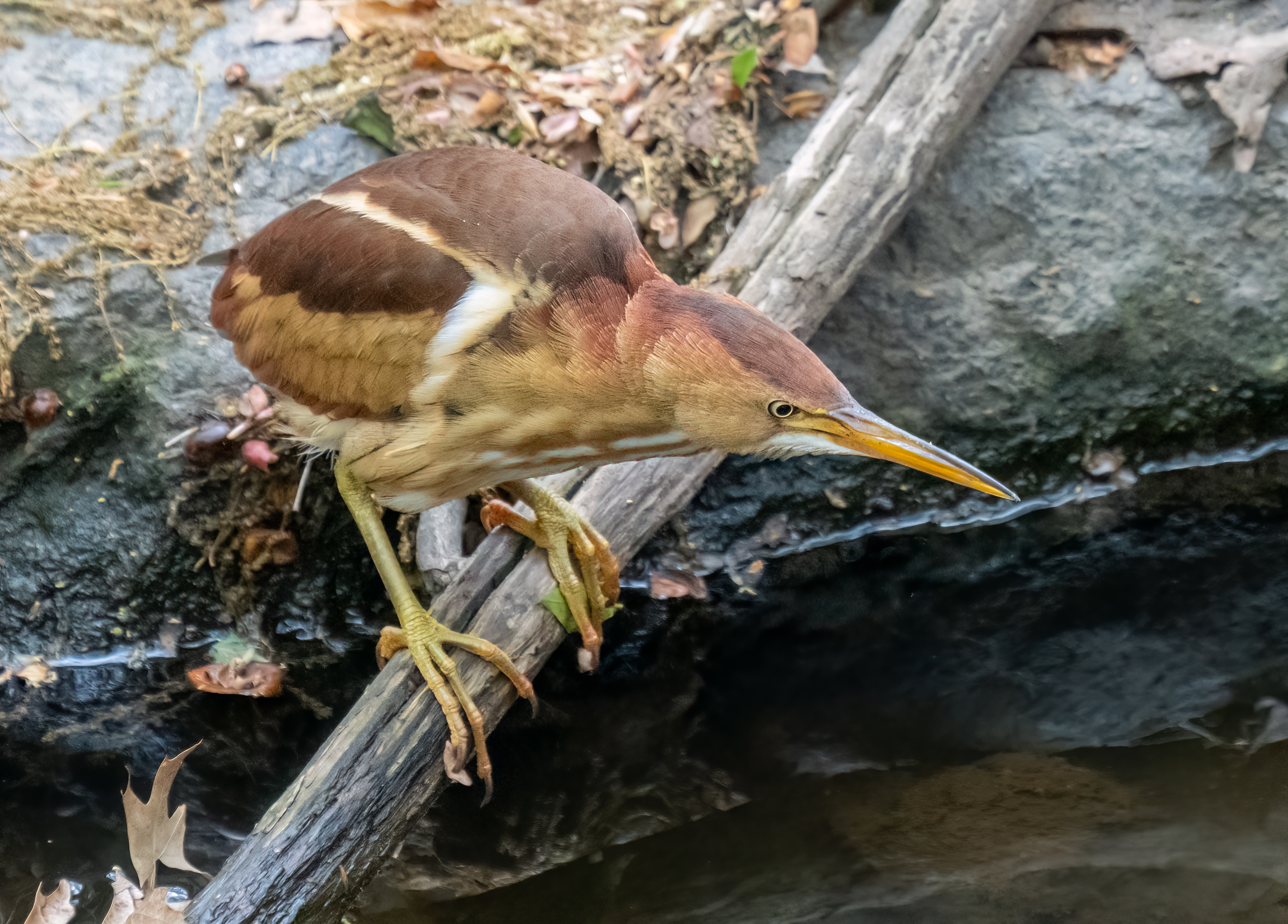
- Female

Conservation status
- Least Concern (IUCN 3.1)

Scientific classification
- Kingdom: Animalia
- Phylum: Chordata
- Class: Aves
- Order: Pelecaniformes
- Family: Ardeidae
- Genus: Botaurus
- Species: B. exilis

Binomial name
- Botaurus exilis (Gmelin, JF, 1789)
- Range of B. exilis Breeding range Year-round range Wintering range

Synonyms
- Ardetta exilis Ardetta neoxena Ixobrychus exilis neoxenus Ixobrychus neoxenus

= Least bittern =

Species of bird

Song of the least bittern

The least bittern (Botaurus exilis) is a small heron, the smallest member of the family Ardeidae found in the Americas. This species was formerly placed in the genus Ixobrychus.

== Taxonomy ==
The least bittern was formally described in 1789 by the German naturalist Johann Friedrich Gmelin in his revised and expanded edition of Carl Linnaeus's Systema Naturae. He placed it with the herons, cranes, storks, and bitterns in the genus Ardea and coined the binomial name Ardea exilis. Gmelin based his description on the "minute bittern" from Jamaica that had been included by the English ornithologist John Latham in his multi-volume work A General Synopsis of Birds. Latham did not specify how he had obtained the specimen. The least bittern was formerly placed in the genus Ixobrychus but when a molecular phylogenetic study of the heron family Ardeidae published in 2023 found that Ixobrychus was paraphyletic, Ixobrychus was merged into the genus Botaurus that had been introduced in 1819 by the English naturalist James Francis Stephens. The genus name Botaurus is Medieval Latin for a bittern. The specific epithet exilis is Latin meaning "little" or "slender".

Six subspecies are recognised:

- B. e. exilis (Gmelin, JF, 1789) – Breeding: east Canada and east, southwest US. Non-breeding: Central America and West Indies
- B. e. pullus (Van Rossem, 1930) – northwest Mexico
- B. e. erythromelas (Vieillot, 1817) – east Panama and north South America to north Bolivia and north Argentina
- B. e. limoncochae (Norton, DW, 1965) – east Ecuador
- B. e. bogotensis (Chapman, 1914) – central Colombia
- B. e. peruvianus (Bond, J, 1955) – west central Peru

North American birds were formerly divided into two subspecies, eastern (B. e. exilis) and western (B. e. hesperis), but this is no longer believed to be a valid distinction.

The least bittern forms a superspecies with the little bittern and yellow bittern.

=== Cory's least bittern ===
A dark rufous morph, B. e. neoxenus, termed "Cory's bittern" or "Cory's least bittern" was originally described by Charles Cory as a separate species in 1885 from a specimen collected on or near the Caloosahatchee River, near Lake Okeechobee, in southwest Florida. Cory stated that the specimen was "without doubt perfectly distinct from any other known species". Further specimens followed over the next decades from Florida, Michigan, Illinois, Wisconsin, Ohio, and Ontario.

Initially, Cory's least bittern was accepted as a valid species, with Elliott Coues and Richard Bowdler Sharpe both including it in published species lists. As early as 1892, however, doubts were raised about the validity of Cory's least bittern as a separate species. Nonetheless, in 1896 Frank Chapman wrote a detailed paper supporting its retention as a valid species. Outram Bangs later argued, in 1915, that this view was wrong and proposed that Cory's should become a junior synonym of least bittern. This view eventually prevailed, with the American Ornithologists' Union removing the species from their list of North American birds in 1923, although others held dissenting views until at least 1928.

Cory's least bittern was once fairly common, but it is now exceptionally rare, with only five sightings since 1950. More than 50% of the historical records are from the Toronto region of Ontario. Initially known only from the North American subspecies exilis, it was first recorded in the South America subspecies erthyromelas in 1967.

== Description ==
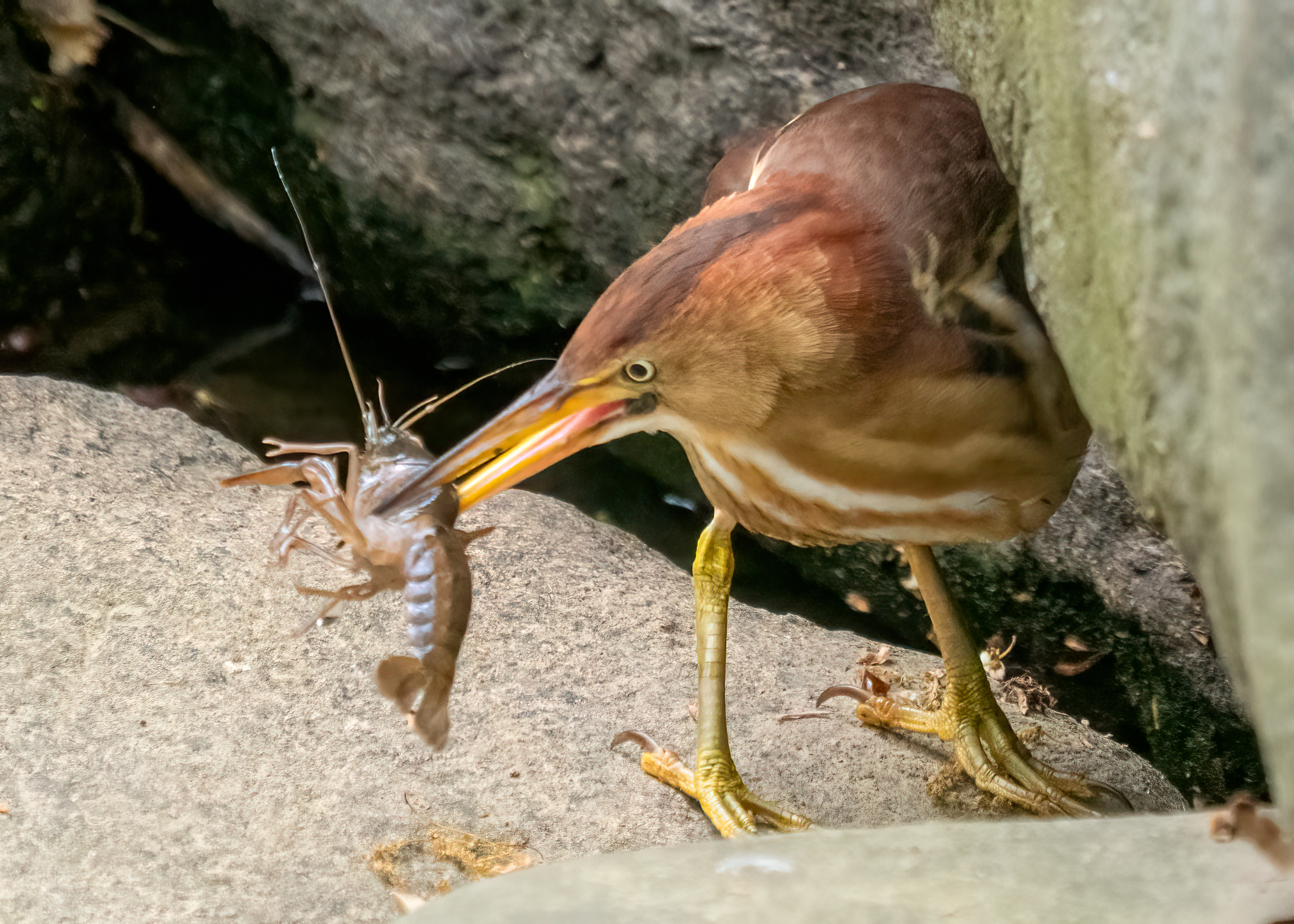
Female with a crayfish

The least bittern is one of the smallest herons in the world, with perhaps only the dwarf bittern and the black-backed bittern averaging smaller in length. It can measure from 28 to 36 cm (11 to 14 in) in length, and the wingspan ranges from 41 to 46 cm (16 to 18 in). Body mass is from 51 to 102 g (1.8 to 3.6 oz), with most least bitterns weighing between 73 and 95 g (2.6 and 3.4 oz), making this perhaps the lightest of all herons. A recent manual of avian body masses cites another species in this genus, the stripe-backed bittern, as having a mean body mass slightly lower than the least bittern, which is credited with a mean mass of 86.3 g (3.04 oz).

The bird's underparts and throat are white with light brown streaks. Its face and the sides of the neck are light brown; it has yellow eyes and a yellow bill. The adult male is glossy greenish-black on the back and crown; the adult female is glossy brown on these parts; both have white lines on their shoulders. They show light brown parts (covert feathers) on the wings in flight.

These birds make cooing and clucking sounds, usually in the early morning or near dusk.

== Behaviour ==
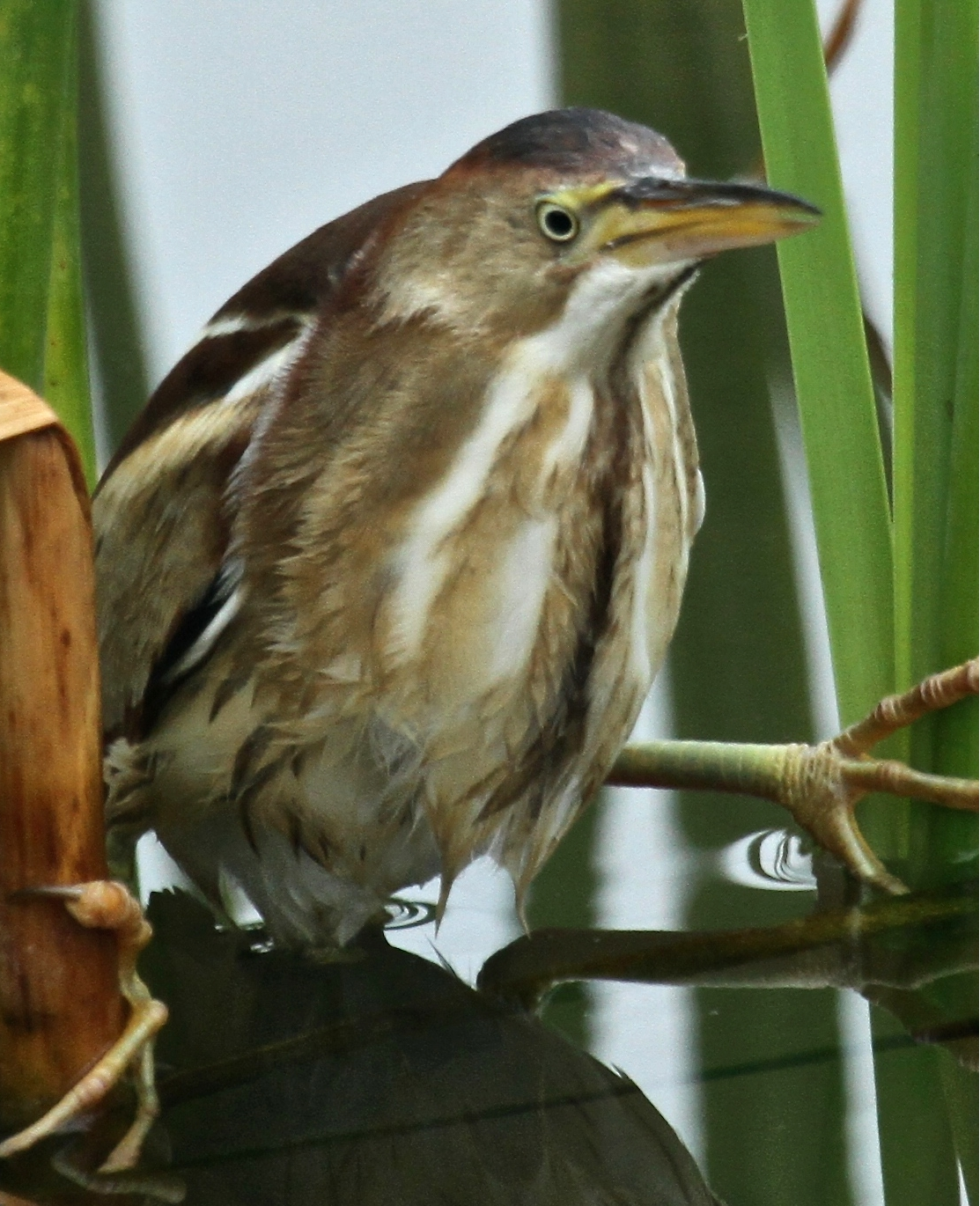
South Padre Island - Texas

The least bittern is an elusive bird. They spend much time straddling reeds. When alarmed, the least bittern freezes in place with its bill pointing up, turns its front and both eyes toward the source of alarm, and sometimes sways to resemble wind-blown marsh vegetation. This is perhaps a predator-avoidance behaviour, since its small size makes the bittern vulnerable to many potential predators. Thanks to its habit of perching among the reeds, the least bittern can feed from the surface of water that would be too deep for the wading strategy of other herons. The least bittern and much larger and different-looking American bittern often occupy the same wetlands but may have relatively little interaction because of differences in foraging habits, preferred prey, and timing of breeding cycles. The least bittern arrives on its breeding grounds about a month after the American bittern and leaves one or two months earlier. John James Audubon noted that a young captive least bittern was able to walk with ease between two books standing 4 cm (1.6 in) apart. When dead, the bird's body measured 5.7 cm (2.2 in) across, indicating that it could compress its breadth to an extraordinary degree.

=== Breeding ===
These birds nest in large marshes with dense vegetation from southern Canada to northern Argentina. Nest of strips of rushes woven together to form a platform and fastened to saw grass growing on the bank of a stream. The nest is a well-concealed platform built from cattails and other marsh vegetation. The female lays four or five eggs, in extreme cases from two to seven. The eggs are pale blue or green. Both parents feed the young by regurgitating food. A second brood is often produced in a season.

These birds migrate from the northern parts of their range in winter to the southernmost coasts of the United States and areas further south, travelling at night.

=== Food and feeding ===
They mainly eat fish, frogs, crustaceans, insects and small mammals, which they capture with quick jabs of their bill while climbing through marsh plants.

== Status ==
The numbers of these birds have declined in some areas due to loss of habitat. They are still fairly common but are more often heard than seen. As the species has a large range and a large total population, the International Union for Conservation of Nature has assessed its conservation status as being of "Least Concern". The least bittern is protected under the Migratory Bird Treaty Act of 1918.
